= WJMO (disambiguation) =

WJMO may refer to:

- WERE, a radio station (1490 AM) licensed to Cleveland Heights, Ohio, United States, which identified as WJMO from 1959 to 2007
- WIHT, a radio station (99.5 FM) licensed to Washington, D.C., United States, which identified as WJMO-FM from 1999 to 2001
- WJMO, a radio station (1300 AM) licensed to Cleveland, Ohio, which has identified as WJMO since 2007
- WKJS, a radio station (105.7 FM) licensed to Richmond, Virginia, United States, which identified as WJMO from 2001 to 2004
- WKRK-FM, a radio station (92.3 FM) licensed to Cleveland Heights, which identified as WJMO-FM in 1959 and from 1990 to 1994
- WWGK, a defunct radio station (1540 AM) formerly licensed to Cleveland, which identified as WJMO from 1947 to 1959
