= WWGK =

Radio station in Cleveland (1947–2021)

- Cleveland, Ohio; United States
- Broadcast area: Greater Cleveland
- Frequency: 1540 kHz

Ownership
- Owner: Good Karma Brands; (Good Karma Broadcasting, LLC)
- Sister stations: WKNR

History
- First air date: June 1, 1947
- Last air date: December 20, 2021
- Former call signs: WJMO (1947–1959); WABQ (1959–2006); WBKC (2006)
- Call sign meaning: Good Karma

Technical information
- Facility ID: 70659
- Class: D
- Power: 1,000 watts (daytime only)
- Transmitter coordinates: 41°30′10″N 81°37′57″W

WWGK was a commercial daytime-only radio station licensed to Cleveland, Ohio, United States, that broadcast on 1540 AM from 1947 until 2021. Last owned by Good Karma Brands, WWGK's transmitter tower was located on Euclid Avenue in Cleveland's Fairfax neighborhood.

This station signed on in 1947 as WJMO, owned by and named after drugstore owner Wentworth J. Marshall. WJMO was a daytime-only independent station with an emphasis on recorded music and local talent. By 1952, WJMO was sold to Richard Eaton, owner of several stations in Maryland and Virginia, under the "Friendly Broadcasting Company" name. In January 1959, Eaton purchased WSRS and WSRS-FM and used the AM facility as a 24-hour home for WJMO; to facilitate the purchase, 1540 AM and an unbuilt permit for a station at 106.5 FM were sold to Tuschman Broadcasting Company. Tuschman relaunched 1540 AM as WABQ, programming primarily to a Black audience with a mixture of rhythm and blues and pop hits and an all-Black airstaff. Famed Olympic athlete Harrison Dillard became the station's sports director and later co-host of a daily talk show, Ring-A-Ding, aimed at the Black community. The FM permit signed on as WABQ-FM in 1960 simulcasting WABQ, then became ethnic-formatted WXEN in 1961. Tuschman sold off both stations to Booth Broadcasting in 1964.

Throughout the 1960s, WABQ was known as "Tigeradio" with a fast-paced Top 40 and R&B format. WABQ was granted special dispensation by the Federal Communications Commission (FCC) to operate around-the-clock commercial-free for four straight days after the assassination of Martin Luther King Jr., earning the station critical, community and industry acclaim. The station's white ownership and upper management became problematic: in January 1975, a coalition of Black advocacy groups and organizations entered the station's studios and demanded the airstaff walkout, taking WABQ off-air for several days. The walkout resulted in the hiring of Black management and a revamp of the station's format to a mix of R&B and jazz, which proved popular by the late 1970s despite the station's low power and daytime-only status.

In 1980, Booth spun off WABQ to Jack Linn; the following year, Linn moved WABQ to urban gospel with an emphasis on Christian talk and teaching, which it maintained throughout the 1980s, 1990s and early 2000s. Linn sold the station in 2002 to Dale Edwards, a Black radio host who previously gained notoriety as a police detective and a onetime bodyguard for Mike Tyson. Good Karma Broadcasting purchased WABQ in 2006 after claiming the ESPN Radio affiliation for the Cleveland market. Despite the station's inability to broadcast at night, 1540 AM was relaunched in October 2006 as "ESPN Radio 1540" WWGK. Two months later, Good Karma purchased competing sports station and prior ESPN affiliate WKNR, and moved the network back there. In turn, WWGK was re-branded "KNR2" with a mixture of ESPN and Fox Sports Radio shows. Aside from a period in 2020 during the COVID-19 pandemic when WWGK relayed SiriusXM's "Doctor Radio" channel, the station continued to carry ESPN Radio fare as a compliment to WKNR until shutting down entirely in December 2021.

== History ==
=== Early years as WJMO ===
On January 17, 1946, Wentworth J. Marshall filed paperwork with the Federal Communications Commission (FCC) to construct a new radio station at 1540 kHz, operating at 1,000 watts during the daytime hours only, with facilities at the Williamson Building in downtown Cleveland. Marshall served as president of the locally-based Marshall Drug Co. drugstore chain since 1936. Initially designated for hearing, the FCC removed the designation and granted the permit on December 26, 1946. It was the fifth radio station in Cleveland (Note: Not including FM stations WHKX and WBOE.) and the first new station in the city since WCLE relocated to Akron in 1945 as WHKK. By May 1947, the studios and transmitter were authorized to be at the Perry-Payne House on 2157 Euclid Avenue. Dave Baylor, formerly program director of WGAR, was hired as WJMO's general manager. The station took to the air at 4 p.m. on June 1, 1947, with a 45-minute program largely inspired by Norman Corwin's work at CBS, using the alphabet to introduce on-air talent and station policies, followed by a "schedule in miniature" previewing WJMO's lineup.

With no network affiliation, the station opted to specialize in recorded music and newscasts alongside ethnic block programming on Sundays, billing itself "Cleveland's News and Music Station". Gene Carroll, formerly one half of the "Jake and Lena" team alongside Glenn Rowell at WTAM, hosted the morning show. Carroll was a recurring presence on NBC Radio's Fibber McGee and Molly reprising his "Lena" character and took a leave of absence from that show to help launch WJMO. By August 1948, Carroll hosted shows on WJMO for 18 hours a week. WJW host Howie Lund joined WJMO to host two daily shows, Fun with Lund and Here's Howie; a white personality, Lund spoke in jive talk and was mentored by Charlie Eckstein, a Black Clevelander who learned the dialect in Harlem. Bob Evans, son of former Cleveland Indians manager Billy Evans, became the station's lead sportscaster. Paul Nakel joined the station three weeks after launching and by 1949 hosted two daily polka shows.

Lund championed jazz, particularly selections from Count Basie, Duke Ellington and Illinois Jacquet, and publicly mocked Guy Lombardo, vowing to "drop dead" if he ever played a Lombardo recording. Lund left WJMO in July 1949 and Carroll, who also began hosting a weekly show over WEWS-TV, left in October to concentrate on his talent school. By the station's two-year anniversary, WJMO employed nine disc jockeys, had eighteen regularly-scheduled programs, fourteen daily newscasts, and played an average of 190 songs a day. WJMO also carried Western Reserve College Red Cats football games in 1948 and again in 1949. In 1949, responding to an overabundance of Christmas music that "...detracts immeasurably from the sacredness of our most sacred of Christian holidays", Baylor forbade WJMO from playing such music until Christmas Eve.

On June 5, 1952, in an attempt to emphasize music over disc jockeys, Baylor issued a directive the station play four songs every 15 minutes and dismissed several on-air hosts. Baylor also sought to have the station obtain lists of the top 50 songs and play them over the course of the day; George E. Condon of The Plain Dealer wrote of both ideas, "it is a noble experiment WJMO is doing and one so obvious you wonder why many radio stations haven't done it a long time ago".

=== Richard Eaton ownership ===
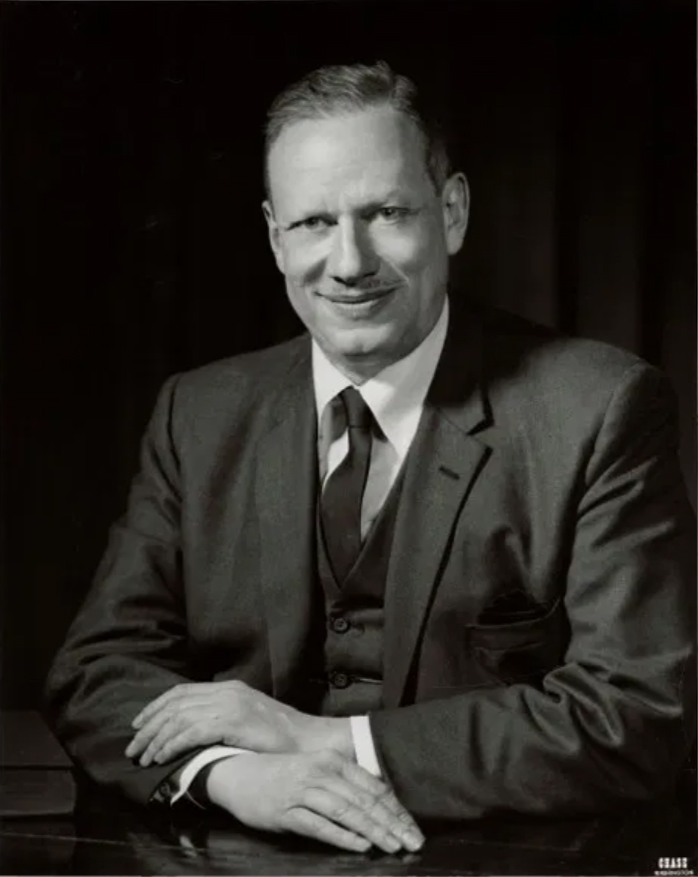
Richard Eaton, owner of WJMO from 1952 to 1959

Mitt Widder of the Cleveland Press reported on June 21, 1952, that WJMO was soon to be sold, and Richard Eaton—who owned stations in Maryland, Virginia, and Washington, D.C.—was the rumored buyer. By July 16, the Press reported Eaton was in negotiations with Marshall to buy WJMO. Eaton's $100,000 purchase of WJMO was approved by the FCC on August 20, 1952; Broadcasting reported speculation WJMO could adopt a Black-appeal format under Eaton. Baylor resigned as general manager and was replaced by sales manager Robert DeTchon, the airstaff was reduced from nineteen to seven and Nakel was promoted to program director. Eaton placed WJMO under the "United Broadcasting Company of Ohio" name, which drew opposition from The Plain Dealer, who owned WHK through their "United Broadcasting" holding company. Eaton then renamed WJMO's licensee to "U.B.C. of Ohio" but the Plain Dealer also used the "U.B.C." acronym. By November 1952, Eaton again renamed "U.B.C. of Ohio" to "Friendly Broadcasting Company".

Shortly after Eaton took over WJMO, the station added two daily programs of spirituals hosted by Mary Holt, who also worked at WSRS; Eaton hired her after evaluating over 100 transcriptions from different applicants. It was the first sustaining program in Cleveland radio hosted by a Black personality since Wings Over Jordan a decade earlier. Holt continued to host shows over both WSRS and WJMO through the 1950s. WJMO also began airing Milwaukee Braves baseball for the 1953 season, airing all afternoon and twilight games that did not overlap with Cleveland Indians games on WERE; night games were excluded entirely. WJMO switched to carrying Brooklyn Dodgers games for the following season under the same setup, with select games from across the major leagues airing in the event of rain delays.

On February 18, 1958, Friendly Broadcasting applied to the FCC for a construction permit to build an FM station at 106.5 MHz. The FCC granted the permit on April 8, and assigned it the WJMO-FM call sign. The permit also resulted in every AM station in Cleveland now having a current or future FM adjunct. Nakel left the station in August 1958 to become general manager of WEOL in Elyria, Ohio.

=== Sale to Tuschman, becoming WABQ and focusing on Blacks ===
On December 3, 1958, Friendly Broadcasting agreed to purchase WSRS and WSRS-FM (95.3), both based in Cleveland Heights, from Sam R. Sague for $555,000. The deal came after the FCC withheld a proposed sale of WSRS to John Kluge, who then purchased controlling interest in WHK owner Metropolitan Broadcasting. Eaton retained rights to the WJMO call sign and planned to transfer it to WSRS. To complete the sale and comply with FCC regulations on duopoly ownership, Eaton sold WJMO and the FM permit to Tuschman Broadcasting Company, headed by Toledo, Ohio, steel heir Preston G. Tuschman, for $250,000. The deals were both approved on January 14, 1959; at 8:30 p.m. on January 19, WSRS changed call letters to WJMO, bringing over the former WJMO's format and retaining WSRS's ABC Radio Network affiliation. The Press regarded the swaps as a "move to WSRS's frequency, 1490" by WJMO, while The Plain Dealer said "at the same time, WSRS ceased to exist".

The changes resulted in Tuschman having a license but no call letters, no staff and no studios. When the deals were made, WJMO was to be evicted from their Euclid Avenue facilities but had a lease for future studios at 2323 Chester Avenue. Tuschman originally planned to rename the station WCLE, but after learning those calls had since been claimed by WCLE in Cleveland, Tennessee, the WABQ call sign was requested instead and granted by the FCC on January 23. (Note: Before settling on the WABQ call sign, the station was registered in FCC records as WPGT for nine days, but were never used on air.) Tuschman was granted permission by the FCC to remain off-air for a month, telling the Plain Dealer the station would be dark "until we're ready to roll". WSRS employees under AFTRA were in a strike when the sale took place, and none were retained by Eaton after the changeover, resulting in the union suing Eaton and Friendly. WABQ's transmitter was also moved to the Chester Avenue studios, but by October 1960 was located on Lake Court in Cleveland's St. Clair–Superior neighborhood.

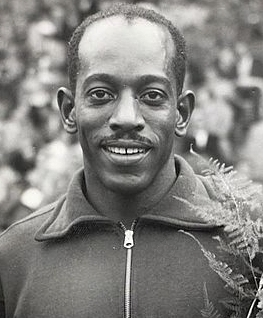
Harrison Dillard, 1952

Tuschman returned WABQ to the air on March 15, 1959, carrying a mixture of rhythm and blues, pop hits, and spirituals aimed at a Black audience and with Black on-air talent. Harrison Dillard, a famed standout athlete at the 1948 and 1952 Summer Olympics, was hired as sports director. The move followed research showing "inadequate coverage of Negro news and service" and Tuschman believed more money was available catering to Blacks compared to other options available for independent stations. WABQ's first dollar from the Union Grove Church hung on the wall in the station's control room. Dick Drury, a white announcer from WJW, was hired as program director and dismissed after Tuschman's plans changed. Jerry Lee Gaier, formerly with WSRS and hired alongside Drury, was demoted to off-air duties when the switch occurred; a white, Gaier later sued WABQ for violating fair employment practice law. The FM permit signed on as WABQ-FM on May 4, 1960, as a WABQ simulcast and switching to jazz after WABQ signed off at sunset. By April 2, 1961, WABQ-FM was rechristened WXEN, carrying ethnic programming full-time.

Eugene P. Weil, formerly vice president and general manager at WLOK in Memphis, Tennessee, joined WABQ in July 1959 in the same capacity. Under Weil, WABQ began billing itself as "The Big Q", poking fun of KYW's "Big K" moniker, telling the Plain Dealer's George E. Condon, "the Goliath in Cleveland has been smitten... Cleveland's Little David is going to cut that first birthday cake to celebrate a year of tromping on Goliath's toes and leaving the giant to wail and moan and gnash its teeth in a Big, Big way!" Weil and his wife were killed in a plane crash on July 2, 1960, outside of Rotterdam, New York, near Schenectady, while flying from Cleveland to Bridgeport, Connecticut, to visit family. An "aviation enthusiast", Weil piloted small aircraft for 12–15 years prior without incident. Weil was remembered by WABQ staff both for his progressive views and being "one of the finest merchandising minds in the radio field".

Eddie O'Jay was morning host from the station's launch until 1961. While emceeing Friday night dances at the Call and Post ballroom, O'Jay befriended and mentored "The Mascots", a group from Canton McKinley High School, who renamed themselves The O'Jays in his honor. Valena Minor Williams was WABQ's women's director, hosting the daily Coffee Break program and presenting station editorials; Williams was the recipient of McCall's 1962 "Golden Mike" award. Rudolph Jones was chief engineer until October 1961, when he pled the Fifth during a House Un-American Activities Committee hearing on alleged "Red penetration of the communications industry" that also delayed renewal of WABQ and WXEN's licenses. After deferring for several days, WABQ fired Jones, citing "shock and amazement" over his plea. Jones later sued the station for $725,000 in damages and said he was "a child of injustice".

=== Booth ownership and "Tigeradio" ===
1962 newspaper ad promoting WABQ's re-launch as "Tigeradio"

On November 12, 1962, WABQ re-branded as "Tigeradio" and shifted to a fast-paced Top 40/R&B format led by Ed Wright, "Ron Tiger" and holdover Eddie Castleberry. All religious and gospel music programs were removed from weekdays aside from a daily sign-on prayer, Williams' Coffee Talk was broken up into short segments throughout the day, and newscasts were at :15 and :40 past each hour. The new format was headed by "Jockey Jack" Gibson, who joined WABQ in 1961 alongside Castleberry; Gibson pioneered the Black-appeal format at WERD in Atlanta a decade earlier and was later credited for discovering The Spinners. Gibson left WABQ in August 1963 to become national promotion director for Motown Records.

Tuschman sold WABQ and WXEN to Booth Broadcasting on March 23, 1964, for $646,000. Based out of Detroit with WJLB, Booth owned six other AM stations in Michigan, Ohio and Indiana, and sold WTRX in Flint to meet ownership regulations. The deal was approved on October 14, with both station's formats and management retained. Booth copied WABQ's "Tigeradio" branding over to WJLB by January 1966. While the Chester Avenue studios were intended to be temporary, WABQ and WXEN operated from those facilities until August 27, 1966, when a nearby industrial fire destroyed it and several adjacent businesses. Both stations temporarily operated from facilities on Euclid Avenue until more permanent replacement studios opened at 2644 East St. Clair Avenue in February 1967.

Holt left WJMO in May 1967 amid claims by that station that she "retired". The following month, Holt joined WXEN to host an hour-long spirituals program at 5 a.m. daily; at the same time, WABQ started Open Line, a late-morning call-in talk show hosted by Curtis Shaw and station manager John Jay, a white person. Shaw joined the station in 1966 shortly after graduating from Glenville High School, and by 1970 was elevated to operations manager. By September 1967, Holt's show moved to WABQ in the 10 a.m. hour and Dillard joined Shaw as co-host of the re-named Ring-A-Ding. In addition to Ring-A-Ding, Dillard hosted a weekly sports show on WERE. Ring-A-Ding centered around subject matter at times controversial and was conducted without a seven-second delay, owing to trust placed on callers.

Mike Payne joined WABQ in 1962 at age 17, while still a student at Garfield Heights High School, leaving in 1965; the following year, Payne returned to WABQ as program director. J.J. Johnson, later a voice-over artist and host at KYOK, KFRC and KDAY, started his career at WABQ in 1968 as "Jimmy O'Jay", a stage name assigned by Payne that was derived from Eddie O'Jay. While WABQ and WJMO both competed for Black listeners, WJMO's status as a full-time operation eventually gave it a defined ratings advantage over daytime-only WABQ.

=== Responding to civic distress ===
When we asked our audience how they found out we were on the air after being silent for five hours, they told us, 'We knew that if there was trouble, we could count on you to be on.'

— John Jay, WABQ general manager, 1969

WABQ suspended all programming when Dr. Martin Luther King Jr. was assassinated on April 4, 1968, to relay news and information, led largely by Dillard and Shaw's Ring-A-Ding. The following night, WABQ received special temporary authority from the FCC to broadcast in the overnight hours, airing soft instrumentals and messages of condolences. WABQ broadcast continuously for five consecutive days without commercials; over 72,000 people tried to call the station during that period, but 10,000 were able to get on-the-air. WABQ also carried the funeral of Dr. King live. Airchecks of WABQ's broadcasts were subsequently nominated for a Peabody Award and won a National Association of Television and Radio Announcers award for "Distinguished Service". John Jay saw the broadcasts as a way to ease tensions in times of crisis, saying, "we gave the people a voice... [and] help keep Cleveland free of trouble". The station again broadcast in the overnight on July 23, 1968, when ten people, including three policemen, were killed in a shooting at the Cleveland–East Cleveland border: WABQ signed on at 1:15 a.m. after Jay learned the Ohio National Guard was being called, and listeners called the station within the first ten minutes.

Holt's gospel program was cancelled in December 1971, but she remained in the news department; Barrett mused in his Press column, "her going leaves a void of cheer and comfort... surely there's a place for her kind of radio". Already the station's women's director, Holt was named news director in 1972, anchoring five newscasts daily. Holt effectively took over for Shaw in the role, who previously performed news director duties but did not hold the title. Holt also oversaw the publication of "Black Brotherhood", a memoir written by her son who was incarcerated on aggravated robbery and murder charges. Holt's career ended on April 26, 1973, when a Cleveland pediatrician sued Booth charging WABQ broadcast audio of a phone call conducted by Holt without his prior consent. The next day, Holt was fired from WABQ. Shaw left the station in September 1972 and later became general manager for WJMO, and Dillard was promoted to a full-time role with the Cleveland Public Schools by 1973.

WABQ and WJMO were both scrutinized by having white ownership while both stations served a Black population of 300,000 in 1970. Ken "Baby" Mavrick became WABQ's first white on-air host in May 1968 in early afternoons; concurrently, WJMO hired Chuck Lansing, a white personality at WCUY, for late afternoons. Mavrick previously worked at WJLB and at WCHB, which was Black-owned, and said, "I suppose I sound Negro on WABQ—but that's because it's a Negro station. On a white station, I'd sound white." Mavrick left the station at the end of June. Barrett criticized WJMO for airing daily sermons Eaton presented which the station claimed in FCC documents as "public affairs", while WABQ general manager John Jay was praised for instituting daily reports of stolen cars. Dubbed the "United Media Anti-Crime Committee", this effort was credited with a decrease in car thefts in Cleveland throughout 1970. Jay disputed the argument that a conspiracy was preventing Black ownership of radio and television stations in Cleveland, insisting economics and availability of stations in larger cities were the determining factor, while Black-oriented radio was infeasible in smaller markets where stations were more affordable.

=== Black United Coalition protest, management changes, and emphasis on jazz ===
On January 22, 1975, the Black United Coalition, consisting of various Black-oriented groups in the city, entered WABQ's studios to persuade the air staff to walkout in protest of the station's white ownership and lack of attentiveness to the Black community. (Note: This was not the first time a group attempted to interfere with WABQ's broadcasts. In September 1968, three individuals tried to enter WABQ's studios to broadcast a message without permission; failing to do so, they went to a nearby church whose services were being carried live over the station.) The staff exited the studios at 3:15 p.m. that afternoon, taking the station off-air. This followed a 1970 walkout by WJMO staff that led to appointment of Black management and a 1971 walkout by staff at WJLB led by Martha Jean Steinberg. A Coalition spokesperson contended WABQ had "done nothing relevant for the Black community"; the Coalition also demanded the firing of the general manager, station director and program director. The protest was also rooted in a study by the Cleveland Council of Churches, which regarded WABQ as "over-commercialized". WABQ was silent the following day but resumed broadcasting on January 24 after two WXEN staffers signed the station on, prompting the staff to return but with the dispute and picketing unresolved. The station was again briefly taken off-air the following day.

The Coalition presented their demands to WABQ during a mediation session the following Monday, with a Thursday deadline to address; they included the installation of a Black general manager, a new news director, a restructuring of programming to better fit the Black community, and a refraining of disciplining staff that walked out. WABQ sued the Coalition in Common Pleas Court to obtain a restraining order, which Judge David T. Matta granted on January 28, limiting picketing activity and directing the Coalition to "stop harassing" station management. A more permanent restraining order was issued in June by Judge Matta giving the Coalition a ten-day notice to refrain from interfering with station operations and to limit the amount of picketing outside the studios.

During further mediations, WABQ agreed to hire a Black general manager, which was realized with WJMO newscaster George Abran. Staff were allowed to join AFTRA, wages were increased and public service announcements and community programs were added. Payne returned to the station by March as afternoon host and noticed "a change in attitudes now ... I'm proud of WABQ now". Abran added jazz to the playlist, overhauled the content of the religious programs, removed the usage of jive on-air—which he felt was "spillover from the old Amos and Andy days"—and promoted the station as "for adults only". Payne gave the call sign a backronym, saying on-air, "WABQ means 'We Are Better Qualified'". The station was also credited by RCA Records for breaking the Hall & Oates single, "Sara Smile", in 1975.

Dee Perry joined WABQ in 1976 for a Saturday-morning all-jazz show, beginning a 40-year career in Cleveland radio. Lynne Rogers took over as general manger in 1978, at the time the only Black female general manager of a radio station in the U.S. Rogers further overhauled the format in January 1979: what had been a 30 percent jazz/70 percent R&B mix was changed to 75 percent jazz/25 percent R&B dubbed "soft soul and all that jazz". The switch was credited for an increase in WABQ's listenership by over 56,000 and a further 35 percent increase in listeners in the fall of 1979. By September 1979, the station was 80 percent jazz. The station's low power and inability to broadcast after sunset remained an impediment, but management held hope of night power via the FCC's planned relaxing of clear-channel rules.

=== Gospel music years ===
WABQ was officially put up for sale by Booth in February 1977 with an asking price of $650,000, occurring at the same time WXEN to relaunch as Top 40 station WZZP, but had entertained ten offers over the previous eight months. At the time, Booth was looking at purchasing WJW from Storer Broadcasting, which required the sale of WABQ. Booth vice president Gordon Stenback told The Plain Dealer the company had been in contact with various Black groups in the region. By August 1977, WABQ moved their studios to the Union Commerce Building. (Note: This studio move was not listed in WABQ's FCC records.) Toledo broadcaster Jack Linn, previously an executive at WHK and WDBN, purchased WABQ from Booth in September 1979 for $600,000. The deal closed one year later; Linn pledged to maintain the soft-soul and jazz format. By 1981, what had been a two-station market for Blacks grew grew to four: WABQ and WJMO, along with FM outlets WDMT and WZAK, all white-owned. WZAK, which had a superior signal over the other three stations, found immediate ratings success under programmer Lynn Tolliver, a former host at WABQ and WJMO in the mid-1970s.

Owing to what Linn called listener demand, WABQ re-added gospel music in mornings in June 1981 with jazz remaining in afternoons. By the end of 1981, jazz was removed from the schedule entirely. Program director and morning host Mike Love, who joined the station in June 1980, was dismissed. Weekend host Denver Wilborn, who previously hosted a daily gospel show prior to 1979, hosted mornings focusing on traditional gospel and even played songs recorded by his wife, Lillian Wilborn. WABQ relocated their studios and transmitter in 1982 to the former rectory of St. Agnes Church in Cleveland's Fairfax neighborhood, the land was also used for church revivals and local festivals. Talk and preaching programs constituted much of the schedule by 1985; as they were paid for by area churches, WABQ no longer ran commercial advertising. WABQ maintained this format through the 1990s, with Plain Dealer critic Roger Brown describing it as "fiery, uncompromising preaching ... [and] also hear voices raised in rollicking gospel". Brenda Ware-Abrams joined WABQ in 1977 for the Sunday morning Sweet Inspiration show, eventually becoming the station's most popular host and enjoying a 29-year run. By 1994, Wilborn had become WABQ's general manager.

Linn sold WABQ to Dale Edwards in March 2002 for $2 million. Edwards, who went by "Brother Edwards" on-air, had been involved in local radio since 1979 and also worked at WZAK. Edwards was previously a bodyguard for Mike Tyson and a detective for the Cleveland Division of Police; in 1990, Edwards was suspended from the police force and indicted on charges of cocaine possession, which he was found not guilty of. WABQ was one of several radio stations Edwards purchased, including WRTK and WPAO in Youngstown. Edwards sold off WPAO and by 2004, filed to relocate WRTK to Lakewood. When the Harvest Missionary Baptist Church, who frequently purchased airtime on WABQ, defaulted on a loan in 2004, Edwards purchased the church at a sheriff's sale. While WABQ was at last place in the local ratings, it still held stature in the Black community, with area politicians taking out advertising on the station during election season.

=== Good Karma ownership and sports format ===
Edwards sold WABQ to Good Karma Broadcasting in July 2006 for $2.5 million (equivalent to $3.99 million in 2025), two weeks after ESPN Radio gave a 90-day affiliation termination notice to existing affiliate WKNR. Good Karma president Craig Karmazin called Cleveland "the next logical market" for the chain, which consisted mostly of sports stations affiliated with ESPN. WABQ swapped call signs with Painesville station WBKC on October 24, 2006, which Edwards also owned and moved the gospel format to. 1540 AM flipped to "ESPN Radio 1540" on October 28, 2006, and was renamed WWGK on November 7. Karmazin moved to Cleveland to oversee WWGK's launch. WWGK's daytime-only status prevented ESPN from having a 24-hour presence and a daily program Karmazin co-hosted and syndicated throughout the chain was unable to air on WWGK during the winter months.

Good Karma then purchased WKNR from Salem Communications on December 4, 2006, for $7 million (equivalent to $11.2 million in 2025); Karmazin did not anticipate owning both stations until Salem agreed to sell. The ESPN affiliation moved back to WKNR on February 23, 2007, and WWGK switched to a mix of ESPN and Fox Sports Radio as "KNR2". Both stations moved to studios at the Galleria at Erieview in late 2007. Fox Sports was dropped on August 29, 2011, after WKRK-FM switched to a sports format. WWGK added The Jim Rome Show in July 2013 after WKNR added a daily Cleveland Browns-produced program in Rome's former time slot. The station also aired Notre Dame College football play-by-play through 2021.

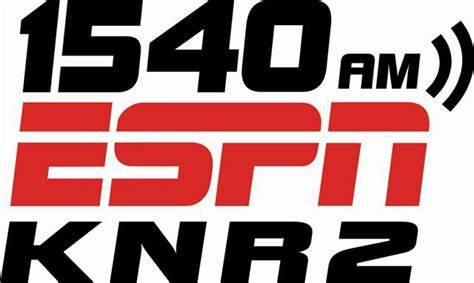
Logo used by WWGK with the "KNR2" branding

Following the onset of the COVID-19 pandemic, WWGK flipped to relay of SiriusXM's "Doctor Radio" channel, alongside related COVID-19 information, on April 22, 2020; this followed a similar move by Good Karma's WAUK in Milwaukee. WWGK reverted to ESPN Radio full-time by the end of the summer.

WWGK was taken dark on December 21, 2021. Good Karma cited to the FCC "technical complications making it difficult to maintain on-air status" at the station's current transmitter site and intended to find "a financially viable technical solution". Good Karma surrendered the license on August 16, 2022, but was officially cancelled on April 21, 2023, after the FCC sent a letter requesting information on the station's operating status.
