= WJW =

WJW may refer to:

- WJW (TV), a television station (channel 8) licensed to Cleveland, Ohio, United States, which has carried the WJW callsign since 1998; and carried the WJW-TV callsign from 1956 to 1977 and 1985 to 1998
- WKNR, a radio station (850 AM) licensed to Cleveland, Ohio, United States, which carried the WJW callsign from 1928 to 1985
- WQAL, a radio station (104.1 FM) licensed to Cleveland, Ohio, United States, which carried the WJW-FM callsign from 1948 to 1965
- Washington Jewish Week, a weekly newspaper headquartered in Rockville, Maryland, United States
