= Danny Wright (radio personality) =

Danny Wright is a Seattle, Washington-based radio personality,

The majority of his career and success was in the Cleveland, Ohio market, most notably at WGCL, where he was a Top-40 disc jockey known as "Dancin" Danny Wright." He departed WGCL when the station was sold by GCC Communications to Detroit, Michigan's Metropolis Broadcasting. New management was brought in and the station itself became WNCX, with a rock/CHR hybrid format. While all of WGCL's personalities were let go, Wright's contract kept him from being bought out, so—due to his incompatibility with the new format—he was relegated to simply engineering the overnight shift for his remaining few weeks, with then-owner Harvey Deutsch referring to him as the "World's Highest Paid Board-Op."

During this period, Wright quietly had studied for a real estate license, and attained it after he left WNCX in early-1987. He was soon hired by WRQC, but abruptly announced his "retirement" several months later to pursue a career in real estate. His "retirement" was short-lived, however, as he took the afternoon-drive slot on news/talk station WWWE from 1988 and into early 1989.

In April 1989, Wright moved to Akron-based Top 40 outlet WKDD (96.5 FM) for the evening timeslot. He later left WKDD in December 1990 and moved to WQMX, which was at that time another Akron Top 40 station ("Mix 94.9"). When WQMX changed format to country music in April 1993, Wright successfully modified his on-air approach for the format. He soon moved to Cleveland country powerhouse WGAR-FM, where he enjoyed the highest ratings of his career. Wright stayed at WGAR-FM until being downsized in owner Clear Channel's mass budget layoff in November 2001.

From that time until December 2008, Wright hosted the syndicated overnight music program All Night with Danny Wright through Jones Radio Networks; the show was generally paired with fellow Jones program The Lia Show. Wright left the company when it was bought out by Dial Global.

On October 7, 2009, Envision Radio Networks officially announced a new syndicated weekend show called "The Live Ride with Danny Wright". The show is a two-hour weekly “concert” to country radio featuring live performances from today's brightest stars.
