= WZAK =

Urban adult contemporary radio station in Cleveland

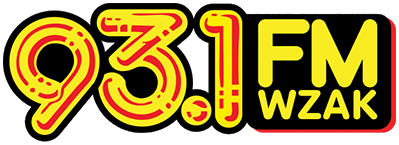
- Cleveland, Ohio; United States
- Broadcast area: Greater Cleveland; Northeast Ohio
- Frequency: 93.1 MHz (HD Radio)
- Branding: 93.1 WZAK

Programming
- Format: Urban adult contemporary
- Subchannels: HD2: Spanish variety (WJMO); HD3: Talk radio (WERE)
- Affiliations: Cumulus Media Networks

Ownership
- Owner: Urban One; (Blue Chip Broadcasting Licenses, Ltd)
- Sister stations: WENZ; WERE; WJMO

History
- First air date: May 26, 1963
- Call sign meaning: "Wonderful Muzak"

Technical information
- Licensing authority: FCC
- Facility ID: 74465
- Class: B
- ERP: 27,500 watts
- HAAT: 189 meters (620 ft)
- Transmitter coordinates: 41°16′50.00″N 81°37′22.00″W

Links
- Public license information: Public file; LMS
- Webcast: Listen live; Listen live (via TuneIn)
- Website: wzakcleveland.com

WZAK (93.1 FM) is a commercial radio station licensed to Cleveland, Ohio, featuring an urban adult contemporary format. Owned by Urban One, WZAK serves Greater Cleveland and much of surrounding Northeast Ohio as a local affiliate for nationally syndicated personalities Rickey Smiley, D. L. Hughley and Ralph Tresvant. WZAK's studios are located in Independence, while the station transmitter resides in Brecksville. Along with a standard analog transmission, WZAK broadcasts over three HD Radio channels and is available online.

== History ==
=== 1960s ===
WZAK began as an ethnic radio station, signing on the air on May 26, 1963. The Ohio Music Corporation, the local franchise for MUZAK, had the original construction permit to build the station. Ohio Music Corporation, couples Xen and Lula Zapis and Joe and Betty Bauer teamed up with their friend Bob Stumpf to form Trans World Broadcasting to put WZAK on the air.

Both the Zapis and the Bauers had been previously involved with WXEN, an earlier ethnic programmer in Cleveland, which Zapis also was associated with (and which had call letters derived from Zapis' first name). WZAK was Cleveland's first full-time ethnic radio station, presenting programming in 17 foreign languages, including programs in Hungarian, German (hosted by station co-founders Joe & Betty Bauer and a second show hosted by co-founder Bob Stumpf), Italian, Slovenian, Greek (hosted by Xen and Lula Zapis), Irish, Arabic, Lebanese, and Hindi. Some groups had multiple different programs; there were, for example, five different programs offered in Spanish and five different German programs.

Most programs were brokered, that is, the program producers were not station employees, but independent producers who put the program on the air determined program content, and sold the advertising for the program. Although the program content varied, most programs primarily featured music from the homeland, along with some news or discussion. Although foreign languages seemed to dominate, English was actually used about half of the time during the station's broadcasts. Owing to this practice, one of the more popular programs that aired on WZAK was not ethnic at all, but was an early progressive rock show hosted by Barry Weingart and Steve "Doc Nemo" Nemeth in 1967.

=== 1970s–80s ===
WZAK's only competition in the Cleveland market came from WXEN which also featured ethnic programming for a portion of its schedule. WZAK was the city's only full-time ethnic station - and its last. By 1979, the station, then owned by Trans World Broadcasting Corporation of Cleveland (whose president was Xen Zapis), found it difficult to maintain its ethnic format. The number of listeners was declining, several of the program hosts had died or retired, and the overall financial situation was discouraging. In 1980, Xen bought out his partners to become the majority owner of the station, forming his very own company Zapis Communications. WZAK began straying from its all-ethnic format, as Wayne Mack began programming beautiful music on the station.

Then, on March 2, 1981, at 6 a.m., WZAK was relaunched with an Urban Contemporary format as "Rhythm Radio 93FM WZAK, The Rhythm Of Cleveland", while continuing their ethnic programming only on Sundays for a while. Ratings improved with the May 1982 arrival of program director and WZAK's first ever morning DJ Lynn Tolliver Jr. and general sales manager Mike Hilber. Several controversial promotions also drew media attention to the station. Over the next few years, the station's ratings climbed and it finished first in the Arbitron ratings in April 1990. Critical opinion also improved. In 1993, for example, it won three Billboard magazine awards. Zapis Communications purchased and operated radio stations in Atlanta, Boston (WVEE, WWTM, WAAF), Akron and Youngstown (WPAO, WICT, WWSY). WZAK faced stiff competition from Beasley Broadcasting's "Disco 108 FM" (WDMT), which at the time played club mixes and more dance and urban music in Cleveland.

=== 1990s–2000s ===
In 1997, the station replaced "Lynn Tolliver & The Three's Company Morning Show" with the highly successful syndicated "Tom Joyner Morning Show". The January 1997 and January 1998 Arbitron ratings again showed that WZAK was the #1 station in Cleveland.

On August 12, 1998, Chancellor Media Corporation of Texas announced its purchase of WZAK from Zapis Communications, along with its purchase of five other Cleveland radio stations, WZJM, WDOK, WQAL, WRMR and WJMO, for $275 million. It was, at the time, the largest radio deal in Cleveland broadcasting history. On July 13, 1999, Chancellor Media merged with Capstar Broadcasting to form AMFM Inc., at that time the nation's largest radio station owner with 465 stations. AMFM sold WZAK to Urban One on July 20, 2000, as part of a required divestiture when AMFM merged with Clear Channel Communications. Shortly after the sale, WZAK shifted to Urban AC to avoid overlap with new sister station (and younger-targeting) WENZ.

== Current programming ==
=== Main ===
WZAK features nationally syndicated hosts Rickey Smiley, D.L. Hughley, and K.G. Smooth in morning drive, afternoon drive, and evenings respectively (Smiley and Hughley via Cumulus Media Networks, Smooth via Urban One). Local host Sam Sylk is heard middays.

=== HD ===
- HD2 digital subchannel
- HD3 subchannel simulcasts the talk radio format of sister station WERE (1490 AM).
