= WNCX =

Classic rock radio station in Cleveland

- Cleveland, Ohio; United States
- Broadcast area: Greater Cleveland; Northeast Ohio
- Frequency: 98.5 MHz (HD Radio)
- Branding: 98.5 WNCX

Programming
- Format: Classic rock
- Affiliations: Cleveland Browns Radio Network; United Stations Radio Networks; Westwood One

Ownership
- Owner: Audacy, Inc.; (Audacy License, LLC)
- Sister stations: WDOK; WKRK-FM; WQAL

History
- First air date: October 23, 1948
- Former call signs: WERE-FM (1948–1970); WGCL (1970–1986)
- Call sign meaning: "North Coast Express", unused slogan

Technical information
- Licensing authority: FCC
- Facility ID: 41390
- Class: B
- ERP: 16,000 watts
- HAAT: 293 meters (961 ft)
- Transmitter coordinates: 41°20′28.00″N 81°44′24.00″W

Links
- Public license information: Public file; LMS
- Webcast: Listen live (via Audacy)
- Website: audacy.com/wncx

WNCX (98.5 FM) is a commercial radio station licensed to Cleveland, Ohio, United States, featuring a classic rock format. Owned by Audacy, Inc., WNCX serves Greater Cleveland and much of surrounding Northeast Ohio as a co-flagship station for the Cleveland Browns Radio Network and the Cleveland affiliate for Steve Gorman Rocks!, Little Steven's Underground Garage and Rewind with Gary Bryan.

The WNCX studios are located at the Halle Building in Downtown Cleveland, while the station transmitter resides in the Cleveland suburb of North Royalton. Besides a standard analog transmission, WNCX broadcasts using HD Radio, and is available online via Audacy.

== History ==
=== Early years ===
1948 print ad for WERE-FM

The station first went on the air in 1948 as WERE-FM and was the FM outlet for WERE (1300 AM), where it primarily simulcast the programming of its more popular AM sister station over the next 24 years. Founded by former Cleveland mayor Ray T. Miller's Cleveland Broadcasting Incorporated, WERE-FM actually signed on one year prior to its AM counterpart.

During the 1950s, WERE, and by extension, WERE-FM, was the first popular Top 40 station in the market, spearheaded by now-legendary personalities like Bill Randle, "Captain" Carl Reese, Phil McLean, Ronnie Barrett, Howie Lund and Bob Forster. Randle was the most influential of the group, as he was the first major-market disk jockey in the Northeast United States to play Elvis Presley and bolstered the careers of a number of up-and-coming musicians, including The Four Lads, Bobby Darin and Fats Domino. Future NBC announcer and voice-over artist Danny Dark also was a host on WERE in the early 1960s.

After Ray T. Miller's death in 1966, Cleveland Broadcasting Incorporated was acquired by Atlantic States Industries (ASI) for a combined $9 million in May 1968. Due to ASI already owning five AM stations and one FM station and because of an interim policy/proposed rule by the Federal Communications Commission (FCC) that prohibited the purchase of an AM and FM station in the same market—the "one-to-a-customer" policy—the FCC ordered the divestiture of WERE-FM, along with WLEC and WLEC-FM in Sandusky, to a third party. WLEC and WLEC-FM were divested to RadiOhio that December, and WERE-FM was sold to L. E. Chenault (of Drake-Chenault Enterprises) concurrently; both deals fell through. WLEC AM/FM were ultimately retained by the sellers and spun off to a limited partnership, Lake Erie Broadcasting.

KFAC and KFAC-FM in Los Angeles were given waivers to the "one-to-a-customer" policy, and the deal was approved by the commission on October 29, 1969, on the condition that WERE-FM would be sold "as soon as practicable." General Cinema Corporation acquired WERE-FM in May 1970 for $525,000, the deal was approved that July; ASI was later granted a tax break by the FCC with the sale.

=== WGCL G98 ===
Variations of G98 logo

WERE-FM's call letters were then changed to WGCL on December 16, 1970, and programming changed from a fully automated format to Top 40 as "G98". WGCL began as an affiliate of the Drake-Chenault Solid Gold and Hit Parade formats, which featured a Top 40/Oldies mix, but eventually went live and local with personalities such as Tim Davisson, David Mark and Mike Dix (formerly of the legendary WIXY 1260). Famed programmer Lee Abrams helmed the station and George Jay was its news director.

General Cinema sold WGCL to Olivia-Neuhoff Broadcasting on August 9, 1976, for $2.5 million; the sale came in the wake of years of litigation over a proposed purchase and format change of WEFM in Chicago, as well as lost revenue and advertisers over a failed format change at WGKA, GCC's former AM station in Atlanta. Olivia-Neuhoff was headed up by George Olivia Jr. and WERE general manager Paul Neuhoff; they had also acquired WERE from ASI for $3.1 million that April, reuniting both stations. Despite the sale, both stations kept "GCC Communications of Cleveland" as the licensee name until they were sold again in 1986.

During the next 14 years, the station would go on to enjoy moderate success in the face of significant competition from crosstown rock juggernaut, WMMS. WGCL enjoyed some of the areas best-known air personalities over time, such as: J. Michael Wilson, Bumper Morgan, Dave Sharp, Eric Cramer & Uncle Vic. Of course, one of G98's most recognized air personalities throughout the 1980s was "Dancin" Danny Wright, who later had a long stretch in afternoon drive at country WGAR-FM. He later hosted a nationally syndicated show, Jones Radio Network's Danny Wright All Night.

WGCL's best showing in the Cleveland Arbitron ratings was in 1982 when they briefly overtook WMMS in the top overall position, but after WMMS re-tooled and recaptured first place a short time later, WGCL slowly lost ground.

=== The North Coast eXpress ===
Screen capture from a television ad promoting WNCX's 1986 launch

WGCL and WERE were sold by George Olivia's GCC Communications to Detroit-based Metropolis Broadcasting on June 18, 1986, for a combined $10 million. After the deal was completed, Metropolis changed WGCL's call letters to WNCX on October 22, 1986 (WNCX was to have stood for "North Coast eXpress", but was downplayed entirely after Metropolis executives failed to service mark the slogan and WMMS did).

The planned new format for the station notably boasted a large on and off-air staff composed mostly of Cleveland radio veterans–eight of whom had directly departed WMMS. This included: John Gorman, former WMMS program director, as WNCX operations manager; Denny Sanders, 15-year WMMS veteran, as WNCX program director and afternoon host; Rhonda Kneifer, former WMMS program coordinator, as WNCX music director; Paul Tapie, former WGAR (1220 AM) morning host, in the same capacity; former WHK (1420 AM) program director and air personality Bernie Kimble, as midday host; "Spaceman Scott" Hughes, formerly of WMMS, as evening host; and Nancy Alden, formerly of WKDD (96.5 FM) in Akron, as late night host. Recorded station IDs and imaging were created by acclaimed "Word Jazz" artist Ken Nordine.

To signal a sign of the changes to come, after WGCL's CHR format was dropped on October 20, the station stunted by playing Beatles records non-stop for 72-hours. WNCX's permanent eclectic rock/top 40 mixed format was unveiled afterward; Sanders and Gorman promised "a much different sound than other stations," and that they would "play a wide variety of music, 360 degrees of rock 'n' roll, from old to new to R&B," emphasizing new music, local records and included a Saturday night dance club music show. The station also billed itself as one of the first radio stations in Cleveland to have a complete on-air library made up of compact discs.

Due to the last minute inability by Metropolis Broadcasting to buy out his contract (which Gorman and Sanders were promised) and his incompatibility with the new format, Danny Wright was moved to the overnight slot for several weeks as a board-op with no speaking role whatsoever to finish out his contract.

=== Switch to classic hits ===
Just four months into the station's high-visibility launch, on February 9, 1987, WNCX abruptly—and with no explanation—switched formats to classic hits; employing Mike McVay's consulting firm. While the existing staff remained in place at first, Gorman promptly departed, and later filed a breach of contract lawsuit against Metropolis. By April, Rhonda Kiefer, Spaceman Scott and Nancy Alden left; followed shortly thereafter by Bernie Kimble, then Denny Sanders at the end of August; Paul Tapie was the only on-air staffer from the previous format that remained. WNCX's relaunch as a classic hits station at first featured a mix of pop-rock classic artists like Elton John, Paul McCartney and Cat Stevens, with little promotion and dramatically reduced expenses under consultant Mike McVay; McVay had prior experience as former program director and general manager at WMJI.

Most of the dismissed personalities enjoyed longevity and success in the market elsewhere: John Gorman became WMJI program director in 1991 and again at WMMS in 1994, later establishing internet radio station oWOW Radio. Sanders joined WMJI in 1988 and succeeded Gorman as program director in 1996, with the station winning the National Association Of Broadcasters "Large Market Station Of The Year" award in 1998; Spaceman Scott went to WRQK in Canton as program director, then rejoined WMMS in the early 90s; Nancy Alden went to WDOK later in 1987 and was a fixture at that station for many years; Bernie Kimble joined WNWV as program director; and newscaster Jack Speer is currently a news anchor for NPR in Washington, D.C.

Throughout January 1987, Metropolis entered in negotiations to purchase WWDC and WWDC-FM in Washington, D.C. for $53 million, but a tentative deal was never fully reached. As it turned out, Metropolis wound up exiting broadcasting completely within the next 18 months; WDTX in Detroit—their sole other station—was sold for $12 million in March 1988, and Metropolis co-owner Harvey Deutch died from cancer the following month. WNCX and WERE were then put on the block, leading most observers to conclude that Metropolis Broadcasting was poorly organized and under-financed right from the start. Cleveland-based Metroplex Communications, in a joint venture with area jeweler Larry Robinson, purchased both stations in July 1988 for $11.6 million. Metroplex was headed by Norman Wain and Bob Weiss, who once owned WIXY and WDOK in the late 1960s; Robinson also had previous station ownership experience—having owned WIXY's successor WBBG, along with WMJI—in the early 1980s.

=== Evolution to classic rock ===
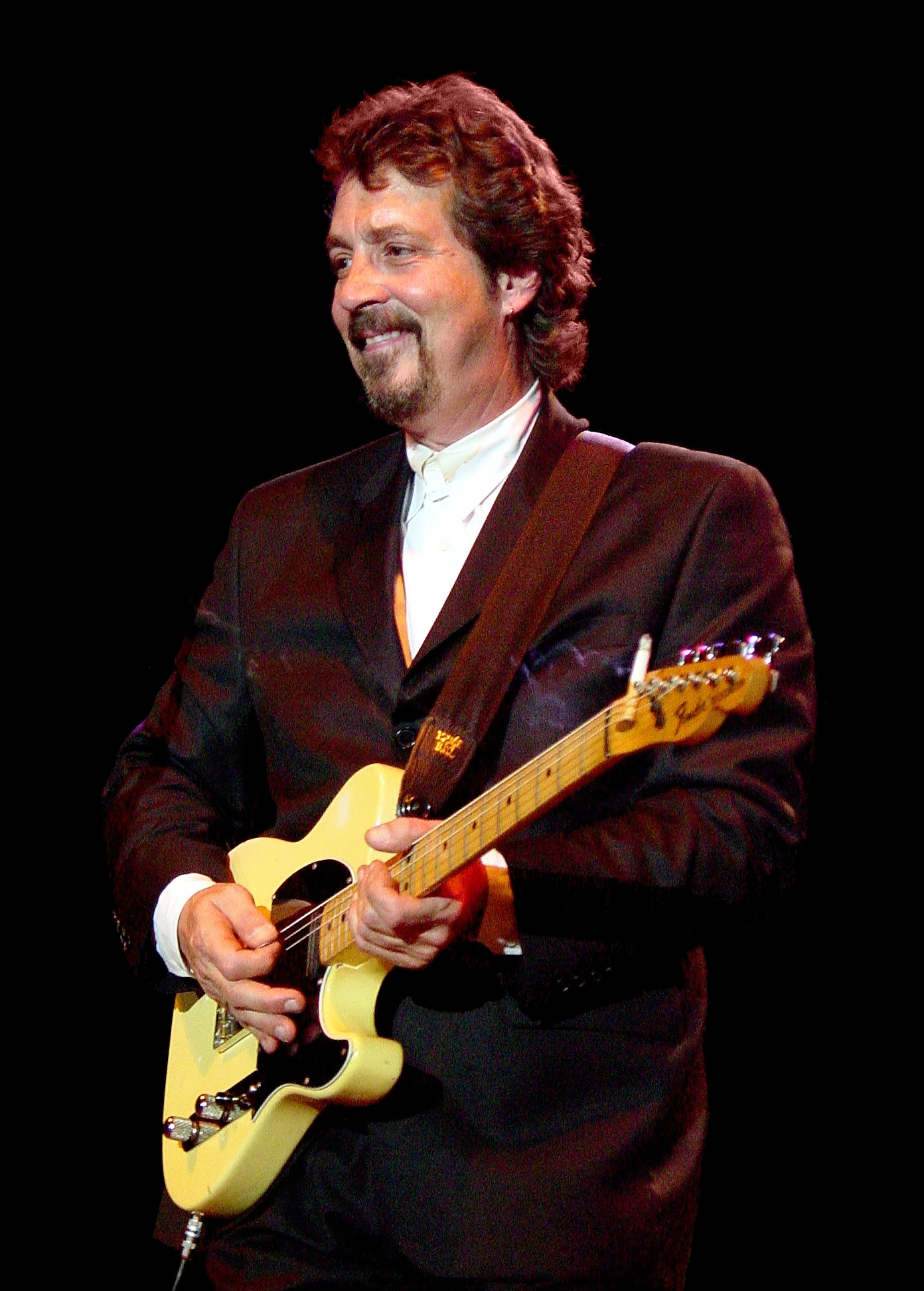
Michael Stanley - who served as afternoon host on WNCX from 1990 until his death in 2021.

Despite having little promotion and advertising, in sharp contrast to the prior eclectic top 40/rock format (which was suddenly and prematurely aborted after little more than 90 days), the classic hits format was given more time to establish and eventually proved to be a ratings success with Cleveland audiences, ultimately re-positioning itself with a harder-edged classic rock format centered on local personalities, several of which have had or continue to have lengthy tenures with the station. Cleveland native Walt Garrett joined the station in June 1987; under the name "Mr. Classic", Garrett hosted the Saturday Night Live House Party for 31 years (two of those years with Ron Sweed as co-host under his "The Ghoul" persona) until leaving in August 2018. Bill Louis, also a Cleveland native, took over as midday host on September 25, 1987, a time slot he hosted until he retired on December 31, 2021; Louis was promoted to program director in December 1996. Perhaps the station's best-known local personality, area rock musician Michael Stanley joined WNCX on September 17, 1990, to host an early-evening program entitled In the Heartland. The success of that one-hour show eventually led to Stanley taking over the afternoon shift outright in May 1992, which he continued to host for nearly 29 years until his death on March 5, 2021.

Paul Tapie continued on in morning drive, later paired with market veteran Bill Stallings as co-host, then with Mike Trivisonno as sportscaster. While a novice to broadcasting, Trivisonno had garnered notoriety in the market as "Mr. Know-It-All," a regular caller to Pete Franklin's Sportsline on WWWE (1100 AM) throughout the 1970s and early 1980s. Tapie left the station in April 1989; after WNCX posted several full-page ads advertising their morning-drive job opening, the position was filled with Those Guys in the Morning: Rick Rydell and Todd Brandt, with Trivisonno continuing as sportscaster. Hired by then-PD Paul Ingles (at the suggestion of consultant Andy Bloom) from KMJK in Portland, Oregon, Those Guys had only marginal success in Cleveland and were regularly criticized by the local paper, often speculating on their departure date from WNCX; Ingles himself was relieved of his program director duties and replaced by Doug Podell.

The station's next attempt at a morning show—Mad Dogs and Englishmen—launched on September 17, 1991, co-hosted by former Humble Pie drummer Jerry Shirley, who had signed on as WNCX's evening host in December 1989. Shirley was joined by Paul Ingles and holdover Mike Trivisonno; Ingles soon left, and was replaced on the show by Skip Herman, while Paul Tapie returned as a sidekick within a few months of its debut. In addition to his new role headlining the morning show, Shirley also hosted a one-hour evening program titled The British Invasion.

=== The Howard Stern Show ===
Following several months of rumors and competition from WENZ for the rights to the program, WNCX signed a deal in August 1992 to carry The Howard Stern Show, based at WXRK in New York City, beginning that August 31; Skip Herman and Mike Trivisonno were dismissed and Jerry Shirley was reassigned to the overnight shift. Then-program director Doug Podell had worked with Howard Stern in the early 1980s at rock station WWWW in Detroit prior to its switch to a country format (an event depicted in Stern's autobiographical film Private Parts). Andy Bloom, the same programming consultant who convinced Paul Ingles to hire Those Guys in the Morning, was brought back to consult on the Stern start-up, as he had been the program director at WYSP in Philadelphia and KLSX in Los Angeles when both picked up Stern's show; Bloom would do the same for future affiliates as well. WNCX in Cleveland was just the sixth station (and the fifth affiliate after Stern's flagship WXRK) out of more than 60 nationally to carry The Howard Stern Show.

Stern wore a military-style uniform to mock rival WMMS and its philosophy of "going to war" with competition

Among the most notorious Howard Stern programs/broadcasts occurred in Cleveland on June 10, 1994. Having taken his radio show from Arbitron ranked #13 to #1 among all radio listeners in less than two years, Stern promised to have a street party and to broadcast a "funeral" for his competition live from the streets of Cleveland. During this now infamous broadcast, an engineer from WMMS snipped a broadcast wire that was used to feed the satellite uplink for the program, the engineer was subsequently caught, arrested and prosecuted.

Stern continued on with the program over a phone line as engineers quickly patched the broadcast wire back together:

Any time you have to sabotage a show and you can't concentrate on what you're doing on the air, then it means you're in trouble. The other stations see that they're in trouble. Lanigan sees that he's in trouble. The Zoo over at 'MMS has been destroyed. They were the number one show when we came to town, and now we're number one. The only thing they can resort to is sabotage...
I am dressed as a general, and that is because it is D-Day here! It is war! I am in the middle of war. I am at my bunker right now as I speak to you. I'm about to take the stage if we can get our satellite back up. It is a war! It is World War III out here! We can't take it! It's unbelievable! ...

WNCX enjoyed a great deal of success with the Stern show for the next 13 years. In October 2004, Stern announced that he would leave terrestrial radio and move his radio program to Sirius Satellite Radio, a subscription radio service where he could avoid the content restrictions being forced on to him by the FCC. His final live broadcast aired on WNCX on December 16, 2005; program director Bill Louis reflected on the show's run, days after Stern's final broadcast: "It's difficult to imagine the mornings without him... what [Stern] brought was a very specialized and special form of entertainment that no one is ever going to duplicate."

=== Corporate radio ===
Metroplex Communications merged into San Antonio-based Clear Channel Communications in a combined $54 million deal announced in October 1993, this included WNCX and WERE; Clear Channel would then take control of WENZ's sales operations in March 1994 via a joint sales agreement, eventually buying the station outright in 1996. Following passage of the Telecom Act of 1996, Clear Channel announced a $4.4 billion merger with Jacor in 1998; to comply with federal ownership guidelines, Clear Channel sold off WNCX to Infinity Broadcasting, while WERE and WENZ were sold to Radio One.

In the wake of Stern's departure, CBS Radio (the renamed Infinity Broadcasting) launched a hot talk format titled Free FM; while WNCX did not adopt this brand or format, it did sign up for one of the regionally syndicated morning shows CBS offered under the banner: The David Lee Roth Show, hosted by musician David Lee Roth, which premiered on January 3, 2006. Due to very low ratings nationally and critical drubbings in the press, Roth's show was canceled on April 21; WNCX opted for a rotation of local hosts in the timeslot before hiring Mud (Wynn Richards), Kim Mihalik and newscaster Mike Olszewski in July 2006. Mud left the station in July 2008 and was replaced by Scott Miller; Kim Mihalik was dropped from the show that October; and Olszewski was replaced by local stand-up comedian Jeff Blanchard in April 2009.

On October 27, 2010, WNCX announced the hiring of Maxwell (Ben Bornstein)—formerly of WMMS—as host of The Maxwell Show, replacing both Scott Miller and Jeff Blanchard, along with producer Dave Jockers; Jockers had been the local producer for The Howard Stern Show and all subsequent morning shows, in addition to having been the station's assistant program director and music director from 1996 onward. Regarding their dismissal, program director Bill Louis commented, "sadly, this a bottom-line business." The Maxwell Show was cancelled on August 25, 2011; local media speculated that, in addition to "flagging ratings," the show was cancelled to make room for "a new, high-profile, multi-person morning show" at sister station WKRK-FM (92.3 FM) as that station transitioned to a sports format. Local personality Slats (Tim Guinane), previously heard on WMMS and WXTM (WKRK-FM's predecessor), took over as morning host that November 7, and had a nearly 14 year run until his retirement on October 3, 2025, when veteran area broadcaster Matt Spatz took over.

On February 2, 2017, CBS Radio announced it would merge with Entercom. The merger was approved on November 9, 2017, and was consummated on November 17.

== Current programming ==
WNCX weekday personalities Matt Spatz, Sue Csendes and Paula Balish host the morning, midday, and afternoon shifts, respectively. Former Black Crowes drummer Steve Gorman's nationally syndicated show airs evenings via Westwood One.

Weekend programming includes: Time Warp, hosted by Bill St. James (via United Stations Radio Networks); and Little Steven's Underground Garage, hosted by Steven Van Zandt (also via United Stations Radio Networks).

As of May 1, 2013, WNCX is a co-flagship station for the Cleveland Browns Radio Network, sharing coverage with sister station WKRK-FM, as well as AM sports station WKNR.
