= WHLK =

Adult hits radio station in Cleveland, Ohio

- Cleveland, Ohio; United States
- Broadcast area: Greater Cleveland
- Frequency: 106.5 MHz (HD Radio)
- Branding: 106.5 The Lake

Programming
- Language: English
- Format: Adult hits
- Subchannels: HD2: Pride Radio

Ownership
- Owner: iHeartMedia; (iHM Licenses, LLC)
- Sister stations: WAKS; WARF; WGAR-FM; WMJI; WMMS; WTAM

History
- First air date: May 4, 1960
- Former call signs: WABQ-FM (1960–1961); WXEN (1961–1977); WZZP (1977–1984); WLTF (1984–1997); WMVX (1997–2011)
- Call sign meaning: "The Lake"

Technical information
- Licensing authority: FCC
- Facility ID: 59594
- Class: B
- ERP: 11,500 watts
- HAAT: 316 meters (1,037 ft)
- Transmitter coordinates: 41°22′45.00″N 81°43′12.00″W

Links
- Public license information: Public file; LMS
- Webcast: Listen live (via iHeartRadio)
- Website: 1065thelake.com

WHLK (106.5 FM, "The Lake") is a commercial radio station licensed to Cleveland, Ohio, United States, carrying an adult hits format. Owned by iHeartMedia, the station serves Greater Cleveland and much of surrounding Northeast Ohio. WHLK's studios are located at the Six Six Eight Building in downtown Cleveland's Gateway District and the transmitter is sited in Parma. Along with a standard analog transmission, WHLK broadcasts over two HD Radio channels and is available online via iHeartRadio.

WHLK signed on in 1960 as WABQ-FM, the FM extension of WABQ. Within a year it adopted the WXEN call sign and picked up an ethnic format led by block programming from different nationalities. Purchased by Booth American in 1964, the station switched to Top 40 in 1977 as WZZP, a change that ignited controversy both among the fired ethnic hosts and the station's listenership. WZZP switched to soft adult contemporary in 1980, then relaunched as "Lite Rock 106 1/2" WLTF in 1984. As WLTF, the station became highly-rated through the late 1980s and early 1990s, but ultimately faltered against stiff competition. Purchased by iHeartMedia predecessor Jacor in 1997, the station rebranded as "Mix 106.5" WMVX, deemphasizing personality in favor of a more music-intensive hot adult contemporary, then with the duo of Brian Fowler and Joe Cronauer as morning hosts. WMVX was also the first station in Cleveland to implement Christmas music on an annual basis beginning in 2001. The station adopted the current "Lake" branding and adult hits format as WHLK in 2011.

== History ==
=== WABQ-FM and WXEN (1960–1977) ===
The Friendly Broadcasting Company, owner of daytime-only WJMO (1540 AM) in Cleveland, applied for a construction permit for an FM station on April 2, 1958, at 106.5 MHz, and tentatively bearing the WJMO-FM calls. Friendly sold this permit, along with WJMO, to Tuschman Broadcasting for $250,000 after purchasing WSRS AM and FM and transferred WJMO's intellectual property onto the AM facility. The former WJMO was in turn renamed WABQ under Tuschman.

Tuschman brought the construction permit to air as WABQ-FM on May 4, 1960, allowing for WABQ to operate at unlimited hours, with the FM station switching to jazz after the AM station signed off. The station was relaunched as WXEN on April 2, 1961, carrying a full-time ethnic format with programs and newscasts broadcast in various languages; the call letters were derived from station manager Xenophon Zapis, who previously hosted a Greek program at WDOK. Zapis left WXEN in late 1962 after a dispute with management and helped establish WZAK, which also featured ethnic block programming. Tony Petkovsec joined WXEN in 1961 at age 20 hosting a daily Slovenian polka program, becoming the station's most visible personality.

Tuschman sold WABQ and WXEN in March 1964 to Booth Broadcasting, headed by John Lord Booth, for an undisclosed price. The deal closed by that October, with neither station changing format or management. WXEN and WABQ had studios on Chester Avenue near the city's downtown until August 27, 1966, when an nearby industrial fire destroyed it and several adjacent businesses. Both stations temporarily operated from facilities on Euclid Avenue until more permanent replacement studios opened at 2644 East St. Clair Avenue in February 1967.

WXEN's transmitter was co-located with WABQ's at Lake Court in Cleveland's St. Clair–Superior neighborhood until a power upgrade and move to North Royalton, which was completed by August 1976.

=== WZZP (1977–1984) ===
As part of another transmitter upgrade, Booth announced WXEN's format would switch to Top 40 on February 13, 1977, branded "Zip 106" and bearing the WZZP call sign. Up to 25 part-time staffers associated with the ethnic programming, including Petkovsec, were dismissed, while WZAK planned to hire five of these announcers. Bob Payton, hired as WZZP's program director, previously oversaw similarly-formatted WGCL and regarded it as WZZP's primary competition. Many of the dismissed ethnic announcers formed the Nationalities Broadcasters Association (NBA), and petitioned Booth to retain time for ethnic shows on Friday, Saturday and Sunday instead of the five hours on Sunday morning Booth offered. After Cleveland mayor Ralph Perk intervened, Booth agreed to delay the format switch until March 13, 1977. WZZP's East St. Clair studios were also renovated and rechristened as "One Radio Lane".

A rally in support of the WXEN hosts took place in Cleveland Public Hall, with Perk alongside politicians Mary Rose Oakar and George Voinovich in attendance; the NBA also proposed the idea of purchasing a radio station. In addition to WZAK, some of the dismissed ethnic hosts began hosting shows over WBOE-FM (90.3). WZZP's format change proved an immediate ratings success: within one year, it placed at seven place overall in Arbitron ratings and at number one among teenage listeners. Under the prior ethnic format, WXEN ranked 21st among all twenty-three stations in the market. This success came as the NBA petitioned the Federal Communications Commission (FCC) to reopen WZZP's 1976 license renewal in hopes of reinstating all, or parts of, the prior ethnic format. General manager Gordon Steinbeck defended the switch by saying, "the assimilation of the nationality people into the American way of life has been so great in the last 10-15 years that we felt growth of the station [would be limited]."

A challenge to WZZP's 1979 license renewal came from the International Broadcasting Company, which itself was an offshoot of the NBA. Ethnic programming did return to WZZP, but over a 67 kHz SCA subchannel programmed by Nationality Broadcasting Network of Lakewood. By July 1983, the subcarrier began relaying Telemet America, which carried stock quotes through a teletext service. WXEN's switch to WZZP ultimately portended WZAK also dropping their ethnic format in 1980, conceding the block programming was no longer profitable, nor did it have any programming other ethnic groups were willing to listen to.

By early 1980, WZZP switched to adult contemporary, which was paired with the addition of Townsend Coleman for evenings. Ken Morgan was morning host and gained notoriety after the winner of a "turkey of the year" contest sued WZZP and Morgan, and was awarded $30,000 in damages by Common Pleas court. WZZP gained a competitor by June 1982 with WMJI, which featured a more tightly-programmed "soft rock" format headed by Mike McVay. WMJI's launch was a quick success, outdrawing WZZP both in overall ratings and in morning drive; Plain Dealer critic James Ewinger said, "WZZP did well with [soft rock] because no one else was doing it, not because WZZP was doing it particularly well."

=== WLTF (1984–1997) ===
While the station's existing adult contemporary format remained in place, WZZP rebranded as "Lite Rock 106 1/2" on March 5, 1984, along with a call sign change to WLTF. The moves were made after research saw listeners associated the WZZP calls with disco or beautiful music. Dave Popovich, formerly WMJI's program director, joined WLTF in 1984 in the same capacity. Booth, which sold off WABQ in 1980, purchased WJW radio in 1985, rechristening it WRMR and promoting Popovich to operations manager. Ken Morgan remained as morning host until July 1986, when Bill Gardner—concurrently hired as program director—replaced him. Gardner quit after one day following a disagreement with general manager Roger Turner, while Morgan's dismissal was criticized on-air by WMJI morning host John Lanigan. Morgan resurfaced at WDOK, which switched formats from beautiful music to adult contemporary in 1987, led by former WLTF assistant programmer Sue Wilson.

With Popovich again as program director, WLTF hired "Trapper Jack" Elliot for morning drive in 1987, but his debut was delayed due to litigation from WWSW-FM in Pittsburgh, who claimed Elliott was still bound to a multi-year deal. Found in contempt of court by a Pittsburgh judge, Elliot was sentenced to 30 days in jail and fined $1,000 a day for every day he worked for WLTF, but none of these were enforced. Jim Brickman, an area jingle composer, created the "Lovelite" jingles for WLTF which other stations used nationwide. Industry consultant Mike McVay, who oversaw WMJI's 1982 launch and WNCX's pivot to classic rock, was retained by WLTF for four years beginning in 1988. WLTF's ratings increased alongside increased marketing and cash giveaway promotions: the Spring 1989 Arbitron ratings showed the station besting WMJI in both the 25-54 demographic and overall listeners, ranking second to WMMS.

Booth and Independent Group initiated an asset swap at the end of 1989; in it, Booth purchased WWWE from Independent Group, which concurrently purchased WRMR from Booth. WLTF continued to operate from One Radio Lane when the deal closed on June 25, 1990, but moved into new facilities with WWWE in downtown Cleveland after it was determined the old facility was too small to house the newly-combined staff of 82. WLTF also became the FM flagship for the Cleveland Browns Radio Network for the 1990 season, simulcasting with WWWE. WQAL changed from beautiful music to soft adult contemporary earlier in 1990, competing directly against WDOK in what was dubbed a ratings "pillow fight" that aided WLTF in the process. WLTF overtook WMMS for the number one ranking for the Spring 1990 book and repeated it for the Summer book, leading management to draw comparisons to both the Los Angeles Lakers and Detroit Pistons, hinting of a possible "dynasty".

Billboard named WLTF the "Adult Contemporary Station of the Year" in 1991, which also saw WLTF tied with WBBM-FM in Chicago for the most nominees of any station. A further format revamp at WQAL in early 1991 placed them in direct competition with WLTF; after WQAL began appropriating WLTF's "Free Ticket Weekend" promotion for their use, WLTF filed a series of cease and desist notices, then sued WQAL in August 1993. Coincidentally, the lawsuit was filed after WQAL beat WLTF in the ratings for the first time. WQAL programmer Dave Ervin claimed WLTF adjusted their music playlist to more directly compete against his station, saying, "[WLTF] lost their image and their ratings—and their loss was WDOK's gain. Imitation is the sincerest form of flattery. They have yet to send us [a] check for programming their radio station".

Booth American merged with Broadcast Alchemy in April 1994 to form Secret Communications in a $160 million deal. Elliot left WLTF in early 1995 when the station declined to renew his contract, while Popovich also left WLTF to join McVay's consulting firm. WLTF replaced Elliot with Corey Dietz and Jay Hamilton, who were joined by Maria Desiray Fenos, a former waitress who won a talent search competition. Despite positive critical reviews and Deitz, Hamilton and Fenos being signed to three-year contracts, the trio were frequently beaten in the ratings by Eliiot, who joined WDOK in November 1995. WLTF's ratings declined by 40 percent in the Arbitron Summer 1996 ratings, a drop that caused Inside Radio editor Tom Taylor to say, "I'd be hard-pressed to remember numbers this bad ... I'm sure I could, but wow. You talk about the term 'bad Arbitron book,' and that's WLTF in the summer."

Secret Communications sold itself to SFX Broadcasting on October 8, 1996, for $300 million, initiating speculation on WLTF and WTAM (renamed from WWWE) being resold to a third party. SFX assembled large radio station clusters in other markets after passage of the Telecommunications Act of 1996, and was seen as unwilling to only own two stations in Cleveland. Rumors of a format switch for WLTF also began after the station began playing harder-sounding music, most notably "Proud Mary" by Ike & Tina Turner. Secret opted to withhold WTAM and WLTF from the SFX deal by mid-January 1997 and sold both to Jacor on April 25, 1997, for $23.9 million in cash and $21 million in company stock.

=== Mix 106.5 (1997–2011) ===
Logo used while known as "Mix 106.5", 1997–2011

WLTF was again subject to format change speculation given Jacor's track record on aggressive programming: Tom Taylor told the Plain Dealer, "[w]hen Jacor gets through with them, WTAM and WLTF aren't going to be your father's radio stations anymore". Steve LeBeau was dismissed as program director in early September; his replacement Randy James commented on the station's future by saying, "I will say we're planning some things in the near future... and I would say that calling those things 'big' is an understatement." By early October 1997, WLTF dropped Delilah, which it had added four months earlier, with James saying the show "just doesn't fit us anymore". Morning hosts Corey Dietz and Maria Desiray Fenos were dismissed on October 16, and Jay Hamilton declined an offer from the station to stay.

The following week, WLTF rebranded as "Mix 106.5: Music for the Rest of Us", dropping all remaining soft music while focusing on upbeat 70s and 80s music with a classic rock focus. The call sign was concurrently changed to WMVX. The station's remaining air personalities were reduced to solely reading hourly weather forecasts, resulting in Plain Dealer radio critic Roger Brown describing the new format "more like a glorified Muzak system than a hot-blooded station... as generic and Brand X as they come". Despite the criticisms, WMVX proved an immediate hit in the ratings, with an increase of 90,000 listeners in the 18–34 demo between ratings books, attracting listeners from WNCX's classic rock format, WMMS's active rock format, and from WQAL in particular. The station's on-air promos also took on a smart-alecky and aggressive tone, frequently calling out competing stations, a tactic James used personally and in interviews.

WMVX began a nationwide search for a morning host by early January 1998, resulting in talent at other stations internally suggesting that WMVX was interested in hiring them. Jacor purchased Nationwide Communications, putting it and WTAM in common ownership with WMJI, WGAR-FM and WMMS; after the transaction closed, WMMS afternoon hosts Brian Fowler and Joe Cronauer were transferred to WMVX for mornings. James left the station by November 1998; weeks after Jacor was purchased by Clear Channel Communications. By February 2001, Dave Popovich returned to 106.5 FM as WMVX program director and brand manager for Clear Channel's "Mix" stations, then became WMJI's program director after budget-related downsizing; Popovich left in 2005. Clear Channel's Cleveland stations moved to combined studio facilities in Independence by 2001, while management was criticized for programming homogenization, both at WMVX and elsewhere. WMVX was one of several Clear Channel-owned stations that frequently placed in the top 10 in Cleveland Arbitron books and Fowler and Cronauer proved popular among working mothers with relatable humor and a refusal to engage in blue comedy.

Starting in November 2001, WMVX switched format to all-Christmas music through the holiday season (mid-November through Christmas). WMVX was one of 75 Clear Channel-owned stations nationwide to adopt the mini-format after encountering ratings success at KESZ in Phoenix, Arizona, which began playing Christmas music yearly starting in 1996. Management cited emotional fatigue after the September 11 attacks as a motivator, which Plain Dealer writer Clint O'Connor criticized, saying, "[i]t sounds as if Mix is trying to jump-start Christmas shoppers and advertisers in a down year, and play the we're-patriotic-because-we-care-about-terrorism-shaken-Americans card. It is doing something else. Giving us yet another reason to turn off the radio." The mini-format was a success and later copied by both WDOK and WFHM-FM, also on an annual basis.

Fowler and Cronauer were fired from WMVX on April 28, 2009, as part of larger downsizing effort affecting 590 off- and on-air staff and followed a prior round of over 1,800 dismissals in January 2009. The show was still viable in the ratings, placing at ninth in the 25–54 demo in the Spring 2009 Arbitron book. The moves came after Clear Channel was taken private by Bain Capital and took on substantial debt, which needed to be restructured amid the onset of the Great Recession. Fowler and Cronauer initially hosted podcasts on their website, while Fowler later resurfaced at WGAR-FM and Cronauer joined WFHM-FM. The duo were replaced by Sean Valentine, morning host at KBIG in Los Angeles, via voice-tracking; industry analyst Jerry Del Colliano stated that the firings were tied to Clear Channel's rollout of their internal "Premium Choice" network of music scheduling and voice-tracking, which the company later denied was the case with WMVX.

=== 106.5 The Lake (2011–present) ===
WMVX's Christmas mini-format for 2010 began on November 9; the early switch was ridiculed by Plain Dealer "Tipoff" columnist Michael McIntyre, who wrote, "[a]pparently, no one has the stamina to listen to 'The 46 days of Christmas'? '... 44 radios a-smashing, 43 dials a-turning, 42 ears a-plugging'... We complain, but after an '80s weekend featuring plenty of Hall & Oates, it's a tough call whether Christmas music is any better. Tipoff's just going to turn off the radio and enjoy a real silent night." On December 12, RadioInsight publisher Lance Venta reported Clear Channel (renamed iHeartMedia in 2014) registered the domain name "1065thelake.com" and directed it to the website for KOSY-FM in Salt Lake City, which also broadcast at 106.5 FM, suggesting a potential post-holiday format switch for that station.

While returning back to Hot AC on December 25, 2010, WMVX dropped the format altogether on December 29, stunting with a broad music playlist and an on-air countdown clock, leading Venta to report the domain name would be used by WMVX instead. When the countdown clock ended at 7:30 a.m. on January 3, 2011, WMVX relaunched as "106.5 The Lake", with a variety hits format. WMVX's call sign changed to WHLK two weeks later. The annual Christmas mini-format was moved to WMJI for the following holiday season.

WHLK has not featured any on-air talent since launching in 2011, this influenced a format refresh by WDOK the following year that briefly de-emphasized their personalities. The Lake's heavy emphasis on 1980s hits initially resulted in WMJI's playlist remaining heavily oriented to the 1970s with select 1960s songs, which occurred despite other large-market classic hits stations shifting to playing primarily 1980s music. WHLK's studios, along with the rest of the iHeartMedia Cleveland stations, were relocated to the Six Six Eight Building in July 2022.

== Current programming ==
WHLK has broadcast in the HD Radio standard since April 25, 2006. In addition to simulcasting the analog feed, WHLK's second digital subchannel carries iHeartRadio's Pride Radio.
