= WERE =

Talk radio station in Cleveland Heights, Ohio, serving Cleveland

- Cleveland Heights, Ohio; United States
- Broadcast area: Greater Cleveland
- Frequency: 1490 kHz
- Branding: NewsTalk 1490

Programming
- Language: English
- Format: Talk radio; Brokered programming
- Affiliations: Premiere Networks; Westwood One

Ownership
- Owner: Urban One; (Blue Chip Broadcasting Licenses, Ltd.)
- Sister stations: WENZ; WJMO; WZAK

History
- First air date: December 12, 1947
- Former call signs: WSRS (1947–1959); WJMO (1959–2007)
- Call sign meaning: Transferred from the former WERE (1300 AM) in Cleveland, now WJMO

Technical information
- Licensing authority: FCC
- Facility ID: 74472
- Class: C
- Power: 1,000 watts
- Transmitter coordinates: 41°30′48.00″N 81°36′5.00″W
- Repeater: 93.1 WZAK-HD3 (Cleveland)

Links
- Public license information: Public file; LMS
- Webcast: Listen live; Listen live (via TuneIn)
- Website: newstalkcleveland.com

WERE (1490 AM) is a commercial radio station licensed to Cleveland Heights, Ohio, United States, featuring a talk radio format as "NewsTalk 1490". Owned by Urban One, the station serves the Greater Cleveland region and carries The Rickey Smiley Morning Show, is the home of syndicated personalities Al Sharpton and Jesse Jackson, and is the Cleveland affiliate for Red Eye Radio. WERE's studios are located in Independence while the transmitter is near University Circle adjacent to the Case Western Reserve University campus. In addition to a standard analog transmission, WERE's programming is available online and simulcast on an HD Radio subchannel of co-owned WZAK.

Built and launched in 1947 as WSRS, a suburban station focused on Cleveland Heights proper, this station became the second in the Cleveland market to use the WJMO call sign in 1959. During this period, WJMO carried a rhythm and blues/soul music format continuously from 1959 to 1999, reputedly longer than any other such station in the United States, and was one of the first major-market radio stations to have an African-American serve as their general manager. At the same time, a number of legal issues surrounding owner United Broadcasting, repeated technical violations committed, strained relations between station management and the station's staff and audience, and a controversial ownership transfer in 1992 attracted criticism and scrutiny by the public, the Southern Christian Leadership Conference (SCLC), and the Federal Communications Commission (FCC), at one point putting the station's broadcast license in question. A series of ownership buyouts in the late 1990s saw the station adopt an urban gospel format, then come under control of Radio One (now Urban One); a 2007 format swap resulted in 1490 AM picking up the format and calls of WERE from 1300 AM, which it has maintained to the present day. Since 2008, an emphasis has been placed on brokered programming.

== WSRS (1947–1959) ==
=== Early years ===
Samuel R. Sague established this station as WSRS on December 12, 1947, the call letters being derived from his initials; an FM sister station, WSRS-FM (95.3), followed one week later. Both the AM and FM stations were licensed to Cleveland Heights, and positioned themselves as focusing on the Cleveland suburb specifically as opposed to all of Greater Cleveland. WSRS-FM duplicated the AM station's programming full-time, but Sague—an early proponent of FM broadcasting—referred to it in a Cleveland Press profile as WSRS that was simulcasting WSRS-FM.

WSRS's establishment on the class C local channel frequency of 1490 kHz was made possible in part after WGAR (AM) had completed a frequency switch from 1480 AM to 1220 AM two and a half years earlier. Operating initially with 250 watts around the clock, WSRS billed itself on-air as the "Community Information Voice of Cleveland", featuring a diverse lineup of block programming. WSRS's staff announcers also included the first male and female African-American announcers in Cleveland radio: "Walkin' Talkin' Bill Hawkins", who later worked for multiple radio stations at the same time, and whose on-air presentation has been seen as a significant influence on Alan Freed; and Mary Holt, who initially played country music, later becoming a newscaster at different radio and television stations in the market. By 1949, Sague entered into an alliance with other foreign language/ethnic radio programmers, including WOV (AM)/New York City and stations in Boston, Scranton, Pennsylvania and Detroit, titled the "Foreign Language Quality Group", with intent of launching a broadcast network of their own.

WSRS was notable for different area promotions and gimmicks. One such content was a "Big Week-End" competition in 1956, where WSRS acted as an intermediary for the winner and negotiate with said winner's employer for paid time off. The station engaged in an ad campaign with an area appliance store based on a "mystery song" of the day, this was intertwined with WSRS's afternoon lineup. In 1957, WSRS celebrated its tenth anniversary by holding a "Super-Chek" contest, where the station's advertisers received numbered certificates resembling dollar bills to distribute to customers, and the station would announce the winning number hourly. Another promotion was aimed as housewives listening to the station at home, with recorded spots suggesting that their spouses' possible bad humor is the result of his employer's poor sales, suggesting that he contact WSRS for advertisement information. In addition, the station hosted a nightly hour block at midnight devoted to music unpublished elsewhere; titled "Tune Quest," this program was sponsored by a local recording company.

The station, and Sague himself, publicly advocated for the use of courtroom photography and broadcasting in the Judiciary of Ohio. On April 25, 1957, WSRS and Sague hosted a private screening of mass murderer Jack Gilbert Graham's trial, compiled from television and film coverage, for the judges of the Cuyahoga County Court of Common Pleas; Graham's trial was the first one to have such coverage. WSRS would also make news on July 15, 1958, when two on-air hosts of a panel discussion program dealing with trade unions and right to work legislation were attacked by two unknown assailants outside the studio; the station had previously been subject to a series of threatening telephone calls over the program's subject matter. Rival organizations Ohioans for the Right-to-Work and the Cleveland AFL-CIO both offered up rewards for the arrests and convictions of the attackers.

Originally an independent station, WSRS picked up an affiliation with the Mutual Broadcasting System on September 30, 1956, then added ABC Radio Network programming in January 1958 after WJW (850 AM) dropped the affiliation. The dual affiliation lasted until that July 23, when Mutual programming moved to WDOK (1260 AM).

=== Sale to United ===
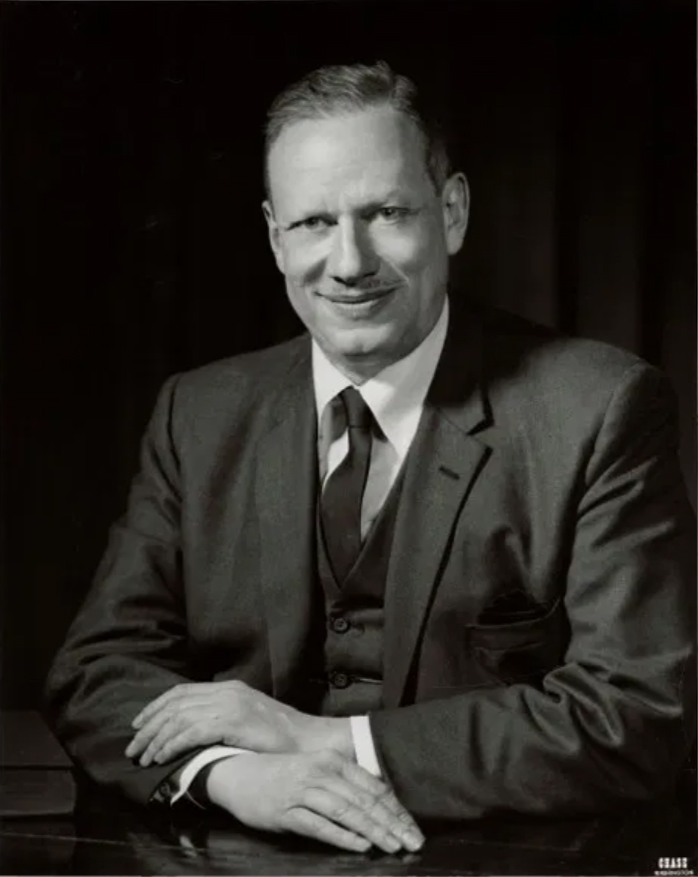
Richard Eaton

Sague initially sold WSRS and WSRS-FM to John Kluge for $500,000 in July 1958 under the "Shawn Broadcasting Company" name. That sale was withheld by the FCC, then withdrawn by Sague, due to a review of WLOF-TV/Orlando's establishment by the commission, of which Kluge was a principal in; Kluge also acquired controlling interest in Metropolitan Broadcasting, which had purchased WHK (1420 AM) and WHK-FM (100.7) earlier in the year. Consequently, Sague sold 95% of both stations to Richard Eaton's United Broadcasting for $306,000, plus a consultant's fee of $20,000 annually for five years, and a five-year non-compete clause preventing him from working for any other station in the Cleveland market.

United Broadcasting already owned WJMO (1540 AM) and the construction permit for an FM station at 106.5 FM, both were divested to Tuschman Broadcasting Company for $250,000, while United retained use of the WJMO call letters.

== WJMO (1959–2007) ==
=== Emergence as an urban outlet ===
Upon the deal's consummation on January 30, 1959, United Broadcasting changed the call letters of WSRS and WSRS-FM to WJMO and WJMO-FM, and reassigned on- and off-air staff while retaining WSRS's existing studios and facilities at 2156 Lee Road in Cleveland Heights. Accordingly, the previous WJMO fell silent for a month before resuming operations as WABQ (1540 AM), later signing on the FM construction permit as WABQ-FM (106.5). "Friendly Broadcasting Company" was assigned by United Broadcasting as the license name for both WJMO and WJMO-FM. United owned 100 percent of Friendly's stock, and Richard Eaton owned 100 percent of United stock, effectively making Friendly a shell corporation. WJMO-FM would apply to move to 92.3 FM that July with increased power, and took the call sign WCUY on October 30, eventually adopting a jazz format full-time.

Shortly after the takeover and call letter change, WJMO moved to a black-oriented rhythm and blues/soul music format. WABQ would do the same, but unlike WJMO, they explicitly boasted an on-air staff composed entirely of African-Americans; WJMO still carried assorted ethnic and religious programming on their lineup, including Message of Hope, a 15-minute long daily sermon produced and hosted by Richard Eaton himself.

WJMO notably took credit for being the first radio station outside of Detroit to play the Mary Wells song The One Who Really Loves You.

=== Legal and racial troubles ===
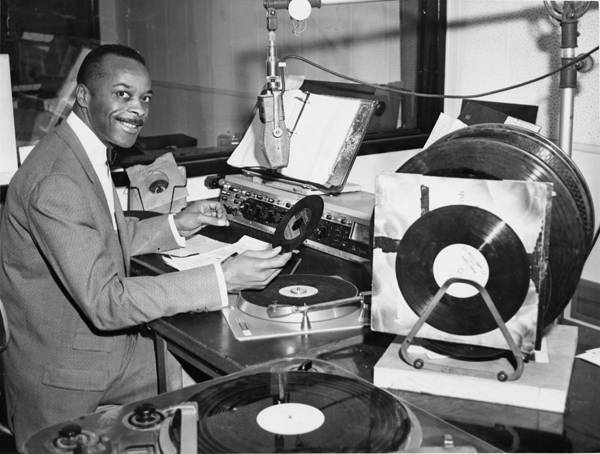
WJMO operations manager John Slade; his dismissal in January 1970 sparked a month-long period of unrest between the staff and management.

WJMO's license was granted a short-term renewal by the FCC on January 19, 1965, along with four other stations owned by Richard Eaton. The unusual move was made due to technical violations at WJMO, and came as co-owned WOOK AM/FM in Washington, D.C. and WBNX in New York City were facing increased scrutiny and fines over their operations, although it was not provable at the time that WJMO was facing issues similar to those stations (WCUY's license, by contrast, was granted a full renewal). Along with the renewal, WJMO's daytime power was increased to 1,000 watts daytime, while remaining at 250 watts for nighttime hours.

Pierre Eaton—Richard Eaton's son, who also served as United's vice president and as a secretary for Friendly—assumed direct responsibility for WJMO's operations in mid-1969; he would relinquish those duties in January 1970, but not before operations manager John Slade was fired. Morton Silverman—Friendly's vice-president and assistant secretary—assumed oversight of the station shortly thereafter, while Slade's dismissal ignited a dispute between staff and management over working conditions at the station and the lack of blacks in key leadership positions. Station staff and local community groups, including the SCLC's Cleveland chapter, presented a list of 21 demands; these included the installation of new broadcast equipment, appointments of African-Americans to management roles, and the cancellation of all ethnic and religious programs, including Message of Hope. Key station personnel formed a coalition with the SCLC that staged a boycott, picketing, and then an employee-led "sick out," which took the station off the air between January 12 and 21, 1970; Friendly retaliated by firing all personnel involved in the "sick out", while the SCLC's Cleveland chapter asked sponsors to withhold advertising from WJMO. In a truce called to resolve matters between the staff and the management, the fired personnel were reinstated, and morning host Kennard "Ken" Hawkins was appointed the station's general manager; becoming the first African-American to hold that position at a Cleveland radio station.

The legal problems for WJMO, and of United Broadcasting itself, deepened into the 1970s. On January 26, 1972, WJMO and WLYT (92.3 FM)—the recently renamed WCUY—were added to a group of five Eaton-owned stations designated for hearing by the FCC. WJMO faced questions over: a possible violation of the equal-time rule and/or the FCC fairness doctrine; the failure to properly file time-brokerage contracts; inadequate monitoring of existing brokered ethnic programming; potential rigging of on-air contests; and misrepresentations of the station's news staff and public affairs programming records. This was later expanded to include a possible "numbers racket" through some religious programming and stock market reports that subversively transmitted information tied to illegal numbers games, following the testimony of several WJMO employees at one of the initial license review hearings. A similar investigation into on-air programs covertly broadcasting gambling information had already occurred at WOOK/Washington, D.C.

The FCC's review of WJMO and WLYT coincided with their reviews of WOOK over the aforementioned numbers racket and WFAN-TV/Washington, D.C. over charges of deceptive advertising, as well as three television stations also owned by United: WMET-TV/Baltimore, WMUR-TV/Manchester and KECC-TV/El Centro, California, over allegations that Richard Eaton engaged in bribery with ABC-TV employees so as to gain favorable terms for WMUR and KECC's ABC network affiliations. Not connected to these series of hearings, United's WFAB/Miami would also find itself under FCC investigation starting in 1973 over allegations of fraudulent billing practices.

=== Phone tapping allegations ===
WJMO's legal issues were compounded on September 20, 1973, when an investigation into possible phone tapping resulted in grand jury indictments handed down against station vice president Morris Paul Schechter (who used the professional name Van Lane) and John Rees, chief engineer for WRC (AM)/Washington, D.C., who also did engineering work for United's WOOK. In the fall of 1972, Schechter, Morton Silverman, and attorney Roy F. Perkins Jr.—who had been representing station matters before the FCC before also assuming legal oversight into WJMO's operations—conferred at United's headquarters over possible payola allegations against WJMO general manager Kennard Hawkins. With the renewal hearings for both WJMO and WLYT forthcoming, Perkins consulted a partner in the law firm he was affiliated with over the feasibility of installing a hidden microphone inside Hawkins' office, and connecting it to a secure phone line, so as to prove or disprove the payola rumors. Perkins misinterpreted the partner's refusal to participate in an illegal phone monitoring proposal as a refusal to investigate the payola allegations themselves, and also based his legal justifications for the monitoring on a misinterpretation of Section 605 of the Communications Act of 1934. Richard Eaton was also consulted for approval, but deferred to Perkins based on what was assumed proper legal judgement and interpretation of the Communications Act.

John Rees was contracted to help covertly install a microphone in Hawkins' office, and have it connected to a secure "broadcast loop line" sent to Schecter's personal home in Shaker Heights, where it was connected to an amplifier. The monitoring of Hawkins' office itself lasted between October 23 and November 9, 1972, when Eaton ordered the removal of the line after conferring with Perkins' law firm partner. The microphone was later discovered by a telephone company employee doing regular maintenance work at the station, who promptly notified the Federal Bureau of Investigation (FBI). Schecter and Rees pleaded guilty in federal court to the charges of bugging Hawkins' office on December 11, 1973; both were fined $500, placed on one-year probation, and fired from their respective positions. Indictments were then returned against Silverman and Perkins in March 1974, both faced one count of illegally wiretapping and aiding and abetting; the Department of Justice agreed to reduce the charges to a misdemeanor. Both plead nolo contendere to the misdemeanor charges that December; Silverman was fined $1,000, while Perkins was fined $2,000 and faced an investigation by the District of Columbia Bar for possible disbarment, this investigation was dismissed after the bar's disciplinary board could not find evidence of any outright ethical violations.

The FCC's Broadcast Bureau recommended in May 1974 tying the wiretapping investigations into an enlarged review of WJMO and WLYT's license renewal hearings; this came as WFAB had their license renewal denied and the licenses for both WMET-TV and WFAN-TV were revoked. The commission's review board accepted this request in August 1974. Meanwhile, the license renewal hearings were delayed until the end of 1975, after a Freedom of Information Act request by United/Friendly into the FBI's report of their investigation could be resolved. Ultimately, the FCC could not find Eaton had any advance knowledge of the wiretapping, nor was there any direct culpability by United/Friendly outside of the misinterpretation of the Communications Act by Perkins.

=== License renewal limbo ===
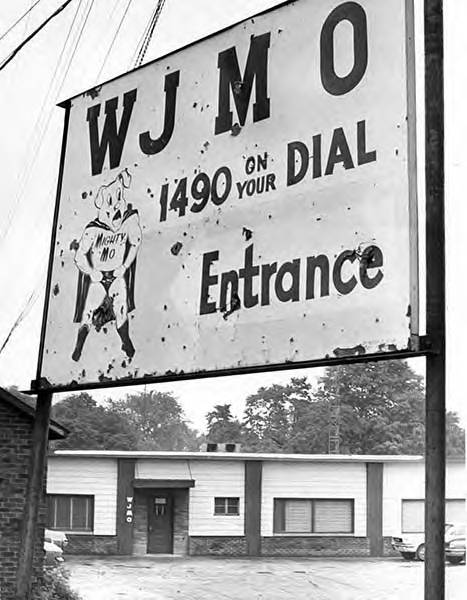
Exterior sign outside the WJMO studios, 1970.

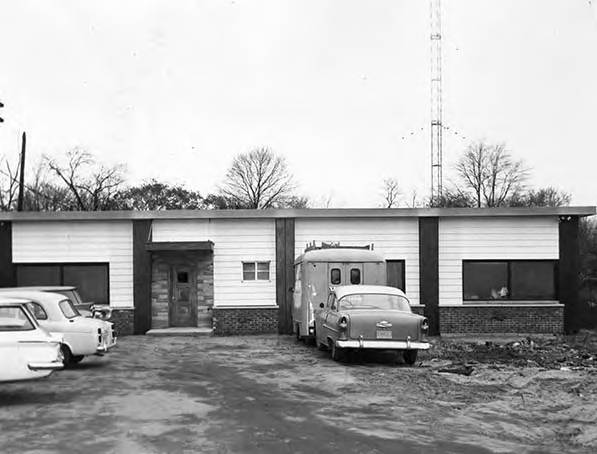
WJMO radio studios and transmitter tower, 1961.

Hearings for both WJMO and WYLT's licenses were conducted by administrative law judge John H. Conlin on June 16, 1976. His 50-page ruling issued on February 17, 1977, recommended to the FCC that both station licenses should not be renewed. WJMO and WLYT were admonished for multiple violations of FCC rules, policies and the Communications Act to the point "...in combination, they establish a monumental record of licensee indifference to a variety of agency regulations and procedures." Conlin also stated this pattern of rule violations was similar to patterns uncovered by WOOK and WFAB in their respective hearings, both stations summarily had their license renewals denied by the FCC; incidentally, WFAB signed off permanently three days after this ruling, while WOOK (under the WFAN callsign) would cease operations one year later and be replaced with WYCB, a new license owned by a group that contested United's license for WOOK. Conlin concluded with regards to WJMO and WLYT, "the same result is plainly called for here."

An attempted sale of WJMO to Brunson Broadcasting—headed by Dorothy Brunson, an executive with Inner City Broadcasting Corporation—was announced on October 12, 1979, for $3 million, United/Friendly planned to retain WLYT. With the sale announcement, United/Friendly filed petitions to divest WJMO, along with WMUR-TV and KECC-TV, under the FCC's distress policy, selling the stations at prices substantially below market value to minority-controlled groups, the petitions included a waiver request from the stipulation that stations that had their licenses designated for hearing could not participate. A similar sale attempt took place with WMJX/Miami, which itself was eventually denied by the commission.

The sale proceedings and further license reviews took yet another unexpected turn when Richard Eaton died from cancer on June 1, 1981. Upon execution of his will, all of his radio and television stations passed from involuntary control over to Eaton's estate as the Suburban Trust Company, controlled by Suburban Bancorp of Maryland, as Eaton was the sole stockholder in United and all related subsidiaries. Due to Eaton's death, and amid questions over character appraisals for the rest of the United stations, coupled with concern over possible linkage to similar actions taken by the commission against RKO General, the FCC postponed a final license review for both WJMO and WLYT to the following June. The FCC set aside the administrative law judge's 1977 denial of renewal requests, and conditionally renewed the licenses for both stations on June 10, 1982, predicated on the findings for WOOK-FM. While administrative law judge Frederic Coufal and the FCC's Review Board both ruled to not renew WOOK-FM's license in favor of competing license applications, the commission overturned those rulings and renewed that station's license on September 11, 1985; the licenses for WJMO and WRQC (the former WLYT) would be granted a full renewal at the same time.

=== Ownership limbo ===
Following Richard Eaton's death, and throughout the 1980s, surviving members of his family fought in court for control of the $50 million estate, the bulk of which were his radio holdings and cable system in New Hampshire. The two remaining television stations Eaton held, WMUR-TV and KECC-TV, were sold off to third parties in May and July 1981, respectively. A 1985 Washington Post profile detailed the complexities of his continuously revised will, which stipulated that: Suburban Bancorp had to manage the estate; no money could be directly made available until 10 years after his death, taxes were paid, and after his first wife had also died; neither of his sons—including onetime WJMO overseer Pierre Eaton—could be promoted to lead United, deferring instead to executive Gerald Hroblak; and his second wife Elsa Hurtado Eaton was prohibited from demanding a statutory one-third share of the estate, whereupon she and their four daughters would lose everything bequeathed to them. Elsa contested the will, which was overturned by Circuit Court Judge Rosalyn B. Bell on May 4, 1983, the overturning was partly based on a previous revocation of Elsa and Richard Eaton's prenuptial agreement by an attorney, at the time under Richard's retention, who was also a convicted felon for unrelated reasons. That attorney was later convicted of perjury for admitting to forgery on the prenuptial revocation, and attempted extortion towards Elsa and her attorneys.

Suburban Bancorp, and its successors due to multiple mergers and acquisitions, remained in control of Eaton's remaining radio station assets throughout the rest of the decade: Suburban merged into Sovran Bank on September 24, 1985, taking the Sovran name; Sovran merged into Citizen's and Southern Bank of Atlanta on July 25, 1990, as C&S/Sovran; C&S/Sovran merged with North Carolina National Bank on July 22, 1991, to form NationsBank. An attempted purchase of the stations and cable system by Boston-based venture capital fund TA Communications Partners for $123 million was announced in February 1989; an affiliate of TA had already acquired a 30 percent stake in United Broadcasting. In part because of a lawsuit filed against the estate by competing cable system Continental Cablevision claiming a right of first refusal agreement to purchase the system was not honored, the sale agreement between TA and United expired in January 1990 and the deal did not close.

At the same time, WJMO began facing increasing ratings pressure from crosstown WZAK, which in 1981 successfully switched formats from block ethnic programming to urban contemporary. On January 22, 1990, WRQC changed their call letters back to WJMO-FM (92.3) and entered into a hybrid "Churban" Urban/CHR format with WJMO under the "Jammin' 92" brand, with both stations simulcasting during morning and afternoon drive time. At all other times, WJMO moved to a gold-based R&B oldies format with the "Solid Gold Soul" brand, having dropped most current music from their playlist, while WJMO-FM continued with the hybrid CHR programming. The drive time simulcasts ended by that October, with each station adopting their respective format full-time.

=== Contested sale, then NewCo ===
United Broadcasting sold WJMO and WJMO-FM in October 1992 to Zebra Communications for a reported $4.445 million. Zebra was a partnership between WZAK owner Zapis Communications, WZAK program director Lynn Tolliver, and WZAK music director Bobby "Otis" Rush; both Tolliver and Rush were long-time radio personalities in the market, and both had previously worked at WJMO. Although Tolliver and Rush were both African-Americans, they only had 23 percent of the company's equity, and 57 percent of the company's voting stock. Zapis held the remainder of equity and voting stock and was considered the key party in the new ownership, a joint sales agreement was also filed between the stations and WZAK allowing shared management and operations. Both the Cleveland chapters for the NAACP and the SCLC, along with five different community groups, contested the sale. The SCLC filed a petition against Zapis Communications in December 1992, alleging that Zapis committed fraud by using WZAK employees to get the stations at a cheaper price while Zapis effectively would be controlling all operations.

The sale was approved by the FCC on May 20, 1993, and WJMO and WJMO-FM became the first radio stations in the Cleveland radio market with significant African-American ownership. Because Zebra was interpreted as a minority-owned group due to the presence of Tolliver and Rush, the FCC also approved a $1.7 million tax break, reducing the sale price for both stations to $4.04 million; the SCLC filed an appeal, while Tolliver threatened to file lawsuits against the petitioners. After months of negotiations and litigation, Zapis, Zebra and the SCLC reached an agreement that November, which had the SCLC gain significant programming control of WJMO—which was seen as less profitable than WJMO-FM—and direct input in the operations for both stations and WZAK. Zebra was also restructured so Tolliver and Rush held all voting stock, while their equity stake remained unchanged.

The SCLC appointed a local group, dubbed NewCo, which directly had an input in stations' programming via a "black ribbon committee" that Zapis and Zebra stockholders were prohibited from serving on. NewCo would also oversee talk and public affairs programming to be aired on WJMO between the hours of 8 p.m. and 5 a.m. nightly via a $1 per year time brokerage agreement, and Zebra had to commit to funding a program training minority talk show hosts. Zapis and Zebra also agreed to reimburse any expenses incurred by the SCLC on top of their existing $100,000 in legal fees. Under those revised conditions, the deal finally closed in February 1994. WJMO replaced all remaining local music personalities in favor of ABC Radio Networks' "Urban Gold" service, purportedly due to the legal fees incurred. Meanwhile, WJMO-FM changed call letters that February 25 to WZJM—a combination of WZAK and WJMO—while the "Jammin' 92" brand and CHR format were left intact, despite prior hints of possible programming changes by both Tolliver and the SCLC.

=== Consolidation ===
Chancellor Media Corporation of Texas announced the purchase of WJMO and WZJM from Zebra Communications, along with WZAK, on August 12, 1998. Three other Cleveland radio stations were also acquired at the same time by Chancellor via simultaneous buyouts; WDOK, WQAL, and WRMR (850 AM); for $275 million. It was, at the time, the largest radio deal in Cleveland broadcasting history, and one of multiple ownership consolidation transactions spurred following passage of the Telecommunications Act of 1996. Two weeks later, Chancellor Media announced a merger with Capstar Broadcasting, then-owners of WKNR (1220 AM); when the merger cleared on July 13, 1999, the combined company was renamed AMFM Inc., at that time the nation's largest radio station owner with 465 stations.

WJMO logo with the "Praise 1490" branding

WJMO switched to urban gospel music on May 17, 1999, after nearly forty years with an rhythm and blues format, reputed by many to have been the longest running format of its kind in the country. The format switch took place one month after WZJM switched formats to rhythmic oldies under Chancellor/AMFM's "Jammin' Oldies" format concept rolled out at other stations owned by the conglomerate.

AMFM, Inc. then merged into Clear Channel Communications in a $17.4 billion deal announced on October 3, 1999. To comply with market ownership restrictions imposed by the Department of Justice, AMFM's cluster was broken up on July 20, 2000: WZJM was divested to CBS Radio, while WJMO and WZAK were sold to Radio One, putting them under common ownership with WENZ and WERE.

== WERE (2007–present) ==
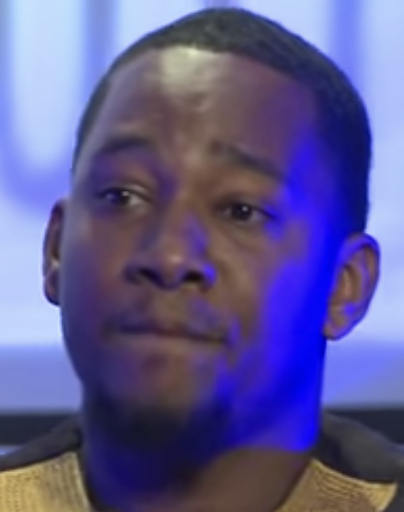
Basheer Jones

On June 4, 2007, WJMO and WERE exchanged call signs and formats in what local media referred to as a "frequency trade". WJMO changed their calls to WERE and adopted the talk format the previous WERE had been carrying since January 2006, while the previous WERE became WJMO and assumed the gospel format. Radio One made the change after determining 1300 AM's coverage area better reached the south and west of Cleveland where Blacks were moving to, while research estimated the majority of listeners to WERE's talk format on 1300 AM would still be able to pick up 1490 AM. A promotional campaign for the switch included automated phone calls voiced by Yolanda Adams, whose syndicated morning show WJMO had picked up prior to the switch.

WERE's format consisted of Black-oriented talk during the daytime with a local morning show hosted by Ronnie Duncan, talk shows internally syndicated by Radio One—Michael Eric Dyson, Al Sharpton and the 2 Live Stews—brokered programming in the evenings, and ethnic shows on Sundays. Duncan left the station on October 10, 2007, expressing criticism at management not supporting the show, allowing veteran talent to leave and having "an agenda"; community activist Basheer Jones was his replacement. In January 2008, WERE reformatted Jones' show into a "morning team" program while readopting an all-brokered format with USA Radio Network shows airing in any unsold timeslots, a change attributed to low ratings. Sharpton's show was consequently moved to WJMO, both stations have since simulcast the program at different intervals. Area businessman Ken Lanci purchased airtime for a weekly infomercial while running for Cuyahoga County executive throughout the summer of 2010. Jones left the station in 2013 to enter politics, eventually becoming a Cleveland city councilman and mayoral candidate.

After Jones' departure, WERE picked up The Tom Joyner Morning Show, which WZAK had been airing since 1998; since the start of 2020, both stations have aired The Rickey Smiley Morning Show.

=== Current programming ===
Besides Smiley (morning drive) and Sharpton (middays), WERE's weekday programming also includes the daily trade union-oriented program America's Work Force hosted by Ed "Flash" Ferenc (afternoon drive) and Red Eye Radio overnight. Taped replays of Sharpton's show air in the event of any unsold evening timeslots. Ethnic programming on Sundays include The Slovak Radio Program, which has been broadcast continuously in Cleveland radio in some capacity since the 1930s.
