= Doctor Radio =

- Broadcast area: United States; Canada
- Frequencies: Sirius XM Radio 110; 121 (COVID-19 extension)

Programming
- Format: Health & medical information

Ownership
- Owner: NYU Langone Medical Center (program content); Sirius XM Radio (radio channel)

History
- First air date: 2008-06-02(Sirius); 2008-11-12 (XM)

Technical information
- Class: Satellite Radio Station

Links
- Website: Doctor Radio

Doctor Radio is a Sirius XM Radio station which broadcasts health & medical information programmed by the NYU Langone Medical Center. The channel is located on channel 110 on both the XM Satellite Radio service and on the Sirius Satellite Radio service. This channel started officially on 2008-06-02 Sirius. The channel was added to XM on 2008-11-12 as part of the merger of channel lineups of Sirius & XM.

In March 2020, Doctor Radio added a temporary extension of their service on Sirius XM channel 121 (the vacated slot for Sirius XM Insight), specifically dealing with information, news, and listener questions regarding the COVID-19 pandemic, which was made available for free to non-subscribers with inactive radios and streaming.
