= WDOK =

Adult contemporary radio station in Cleveland

- Cleveland, Ohio; United States
- Broadcast area: Greater Cleveland; Northeast Ohio
- Frequency: 102.1 MHz (HD Radio)
- Branding: Star 102

Programming
- Format: Adult contemporary Christmas

Ownership
- Owner: Audacy, Inc.; (Audacy License, LLC)
- Sister stations: WKRK-FM; WNCX; WQAL

History
- First air date: October 4, 1954
- Former call signs: WDOK-FM (1954–1965)
- Call sign meaning: Taken from WDOK (AM)

Technical information
- Licensing authority: FCC
- Facility ID: 28525
- Class: B
- ERP: 12,000 watts
- HAAT: 306 meters (1,004 ft)
- Transmitter coordinates: 41°22′58″N 81°42′07″W

Links
- Public license information: Public file; LMS
- Webcast: Listen live (via Audacy)
- Website: www.audacy.com/star102cleveland

WDOK (102.1 FM) is a commercial radio station licensed to Cleveland, Ohio, known as "Star 102" and featuring an adult contemporary format, and is the Cleveland affiliate for Delilah. Owned by Audacy, Inc., the station serves Greater Cleveland and surrounding Northeast Ohio. WDOK's studios are located at the Halle Building in Downtown Cleveland while the transmitter is in the Cleveland suburb of Parma. In addition to a standard analog transmission, WDOK broadcasts in HD Radio and is available online via Audacy.

== History ==
=== WEWS-FM ===
The frequency was formerly occupied by WEWS-FM, which signed on in November 27, 1947. The station was owned by E. W. Scripps and it signed off on March 25, 1950 due to the owners' focus on television.

=== Beautiful music ===
The station signed on as WDOK-FM on October 4, 1954, simulcasting its sister station, WDOK (1260 AM). Eventually, WDOK-FM originated its own programming and featured a beautiful music format. On December 12, 1965, the AM station changed its call sign to WIXY and adopted a Top 40 format. That allowed FM 102.1 to drop the FM suffix, now identifying as WDOK. The station was branded "Stereo Cleveland", with the slogan "Beautiful Music for the Lands of the Western Reserve."

Station personalities and voice overs included Wayne Mack, the founder of WDOK's music format and producer of the many memorable monthly odes and station breaks that he composed and set to music; Ken Nordine (the famous voice of Word Jazz), Tom Armstrong, previously the morning host at WGAR AM in the 1940s and 50s; and David Mark, who also worked for Cleveland market "beautiful music" stations WQAL, WKSW, WJW (AM), and WDBN. The station was programmed by Peter Irmiter and Neil Hershberger after they went live.

By the 1980s, WDOK had come under common ownership with WWWE; both stations were sold on November 30, 1987, by Lake Erie Radio Company, owned by Art Modell and Al Lerner, to the Independent Group Limited partnership, owned by Tom Embrescia, Larry Pollock, and Tom Wilson.

=== Soft Rock 102.1 ===
By the mid-1980s, WDOK's beautiful music format had brightened, with more vocals being played from such "soft rock" artists such as James Taylor and Elton John. Ratings remained high, but the format attracted mostly older listeners in advertiser-unfriendly demographics and not the younger audiences courted by advertisers. So WDOK made the final and complete switch to a soft adult contemporary format in April 1987 with Sue Wilson as program director. Alongside its music programming at the time, WDOK was also once the flagship station for both the Cleveland Browns and the Cleveland Cavaliers.

The station promoted its new AC format with TV commercials announcing that it was "coming out of the elevator" (as in "elevator music"). WDOK initially positioned itself midway between beautiful music (which continued for a few more years on WQAL) and the mainstream AC format played on WLTF and WMJI.

=== New 102/Star 102 ===
On January 9, 2012, WDOK debuted a new and more up tempo playlist (going from Soft AC to more mainstream AC), re-branded as "The New 102", complete with an updated logo and imaging. On November 13, 2012, WDOK moved from its longtime studio home at One Radio Lane, off East Saint Clair Avenue in Downtown Cleveland, to the Halle Building on Euclid Avenue, also Downtown. Sister station WQAL joined WDOK in the move; as a result, all four Cleveland CBS Radio stations are now located in the same building.

Longtime WDOK morning host "Trapper" Jack Elliot announced on December 19, 2012, that the station had opted not to renew the contracts of both he and cohost Jim McIntyre, much to the dismay of many listeners. On April 3, 2015, WDOK rebranded as "Star 102".

On February 2, 2017, CBS Radio announced it would merge with Entercom. The merger was approved on November 9, 2017, and was consummated on the 17th.

=== Christmas music ===
Traditionally, WDOK plays Christmas music throughout the holiday season under the brand "Christmas 102", usually beginning around mid-November competing against WMJI and, until 2024, WFHM-FM.

In December 2018, after the station did its annual switch to all Christmas music, WDOK decided to stop playing the well-known 1944 Christmas song Baby, It's Cold Outside, saying the lyrics seemed inappropriate in a time of the #MeToo movement, with increasing sensitivity and awareness of sexual manipulation and harassment of women. The station's move sparked national, and even international, attention and controversy.

== Current programming ==
The weekday schedule includes WDOK personalities Jen Toohey and Tim Richards (mornings), Jill Bucco (middays), and Chase Daniels (afternoons), with the nationally syndicated Delilah (from Premiere Radio Networks) airing evenings. On weekends, Throwback Nation Radio with Tony Lorino is heard on Saturday evenings. Acoustic Sunrise with Matthew Reid can be heard every Sunday morning. Locally produced Cleveland Connection can be heard early Sunday mornings. Until the late-2010s, WDOK was once the Cleveland affiliate for America's Greatest Hits with Scott Shannon.

The HD2 digital subchannel formerly broadcast an adult album alternative format under the brand "The Coffee Shop". It has since been turned off.
