= WQAL =

Hot adult contemporary radio station in Cleveland

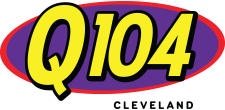
- Cleveland, Ohio; United States
- Broadcast area: Greater Cleveland
- Frequency: 104.1 MHz (HD Radio)
- Branding: Q104

Programming
- Format: Hot adult contemporary
- Subchannels: HD2: Channel Q
- Affiliations: Westwood One

Ownership
- Owner: Audacy, Inc.; (Audacy License, LLC)
- Sister stations: WDOK; WKRK-FM; WNCX

History
- First air date: April 5, 1948
- Former call signs: WJW-FM (1948–1968); WCJW (1968–1971)
- Call sign meaning: "Quality"

Technical information
- Licensing authority: FCC
- Facility ID: 72889
- Class: B
- ERP: 12,000 watts
- HAAT: 293 meters (961 ft)
- Transmitter coordinates: 41°20′28.00″N 81°44′24.00″W

Links
- Public license information: Public file; LMS
- Webcast: Listen live (via Audacy)
- Website: audacy.com/q104

WQAL (104.1 FM, "Q104") is a commercial radio station licensed to Cleveland, Ohio, United States, featuring a hot adult contemporary format. Owned by Audacy, Inc., the station serves Greater Cleveland and surrounding Northeast Ohio. WQAL's studios are located at the Halle Building in Downtown Cleveland, and the transmitter is in North Royalton. In addition to a standard analog transmission, WQAL broadcasts over two HD Radio channels, and is available online via Audacy.

WQAL originated as WJW-FM in 1948, the FM extension of WJW (850 AM). Because of persistent schedule conflicts with ABC Radio programming on WJW, WJW-FM became the primary flagship station for the Cleveland Indians Radio Network during their 1948 championship season, and helped initiate early FM adoption in the Cleveland market. From 1950 until 1965, WJW-FM simulcast WJW outright, then aired taped classical music after mandates that FM stations needed unique programming. The station became WCJW in 1968 with Nashville sound-focused country music, but was sold off by Storer Broadcasting at the end of 1970 due to major financial losses incurred from their ownership of Northeast Airlines. Adopting the WQAL call sign in 1971, it featured a popular beautiful music format through the 1970s and 1980s, and since 1991 has carried its present adult contemporary format and "Q104" branding.

== History ==
=== Early years ===
WJW (850 AM), owned by William M. O'Neil, Jr., filed paperwork with the Federal Communications Commission (FCC) to construct an FM station on August 11, 1945. WJW's application was one of 11 such applications in Cleveland, Elyria and Akron that the FCC ultimately held hearings over due to the commission initially reserving ten channels for use in the area. A permit was officially granted to WJW on June 30, 1947, alongside the ten other applicants; WJW-FM was slated to largely repeat the content of WJW for fifteen hours out of their 18-hour broadcast day.

WJW-FM took to the air on April 5, 1948: this was largely coordinated with the beginning of the 1948 season for the Cleveland Indians, as WJW agreed to become the flagship of a statewide radio network. Due to WJW's contractual obligations with ABC Radio, the majority of games during the season aired solely on the FM station, a problem exacerbated by the team moving the start time for games to earlier in the afternoon in the middle of ABC programming; WJW could only commit to airing half of the schedule. The Cleveland Press editorial board was critical of the flagship arrangement but doubted claims from "suspicious fans" that it was "all a plot to sell FM sets". Less than 10,000 FM receivers were estimated to be in use in the region when the season began, with an increase in the purchase of FM tuners attributed directly to WJW-FM carrying the games. At the end of 1948, WJW-FM was named flagship of the Standard Network, a 14-station statewide service for FM stations. While the schedule conflicts were resolved for WJW the following year, WERE (1300 AM) took over as Indians radio flagship in 1950.

From 1949 onward, WJW-FM operated as a pure simulcast of the AM station, save for occasional deviations. Both WJW and WJW-FM were sold to Storer Broadcasting on October 8, 1954, and moved to a combined facility with co-owned WXEL (renamed WJW-TV) at Playhouse Square in 1956. WJW planned to disaffiliate from ABC in late November 1957 to focus more on contemporary music, but arranged to have the Metropolitan Opera radio broadcasts carried over WJW-FM; this bypassed a separate offer by ABC to run the Opera via tape over WDOK. This agreement ended one month later, when WSRS AM-FM picked up ABC programming along with the Opera broadcasts.

By March 1961, WJW and WJW-FM were operating from studios at the AM station's transmitter site in North Royalton, which also housed the FM's transmitter. The AM/FM simulcast was partially broken up on November 8, 1965, with taped classical music and concert programming from International Good Music airing daily over WJW-FM after 12 p.m.; the separation was made after the Federal Communications Commission (FCC) enacted the FM Non-Duplication Rule, mandating that FM stations could no longer fully duplicate the programming of their AM counterparts.

WJW-FM was fully relaunched as WCJW on January 15, 1968, featuring a country music format dubbed "The Countrypolitan sound of Cleveland". WCJW represented the first full-time country station in the Cleveland market; prior to this, the format was only heard over WSLR in Akron, Ohio, and in the late hours on ethnic station WZAK. Charles Renwick, general manager for WJW and WCJW, was given full leeway by Storer to choose the new format, and selected country after investigating the "Nashville sound" through several trips to Nashville. WJW personalities were heard over WCJW via voice-tracking, but by 1970, WCJW hired Al Moore as a dedicated host in afternoons and upgraded to stereo. WCJW's tower was also moved to the WJW-TV tower in Parma and began 24-hour broadcasting. While still largely automated, music was selected and scheduled locally by production manager Merrill Cosgrove.

=== Beautiful music era ===
In late 1970, Storer sold off WCJW and WPNA in Philadelphia to SJR Communications—the broadcast division of San Juan Racing Association—for a combined $1.4 million. The sale came as Storer experienced substantial financial losses operating Northeast Airlines, and proceeded to divest themselves of all but one of their FM stations. A format change was largely expected and Cosgrove told the Press in a profile on her that she would not be retained. The deal closed on May 12, 1971, and WCJW was relaunched as WQAL, featuring an automated beautiful music format. SJR selected the calls to stand for "quality" and to counter negative perceptions Clevelanders had toward the city. Press columnist Bill Barrett printed letters from dismayed WCJW listeners in his column, suggesting FM listeners are "... showing the same traits now as the AM audience involvement in programing [sic] and prompt a strong reaction when a favorite sound is disturbed." WQAL's format was at first largely programmed by SJR's WJMD in Washington, D.C., and new studios were set up on Euclid Avenue; it also proved to be an immediate success in Cleveland Arbitron ratings, jumping from 20th place overall to 11th place.

WQAL had no air talent from their launch until March 19, 1973, when "Tall Ted" Hallaman debuted in morning drive; Hallaman's arrival was the latest in a series of popular personalities on the AM dial that moved to FM. Al James, formerly with WWWE and WHK, joined WQAL in early 1975 for afternoons and later said of his switch to FM, "looking back, I'm really happy I made the move—but I admit I gave it a lot of thought before doing it". James "Jay Lynn" Threatt joined the station three months after it launched to operate the automation system; by 1974, Lynn was the overnight host, a role he kept until retiring in 2002. The additions of personalities helped further WQAL's ratings growth: in multiple Arbitron surveys through the 1970s, it was top-ranked among adults 18 and older, and the April-May 1978 Arbitron showed WQAL listeners tuned into the station for 12 hours and 24 minutes every week. Ed Fisher, long the morning-drive host at WJW, joined WQAL in 1979 in the same capacity; Fisher replaced Hallaman, who left WQAL to become WDOK's morning host.

Despite high ratings, WQAL's 1978 license renewal was in doubt. The FCC sought to enforce a 6 percent weekly minimum of non-entertainment programming among FM stations, and WQAL proposed 2.9 percent of weekly non-entertainment fare, including two daily shows at 8:55 a.m. and 6:25 p.m., and a weekend program at 4:30 a.m. Five other FM stations also allotted the bare minimum for such programming, but the FCC voted unanimously in April 1978 to designate WQAL's license for hearing, the first station to have its license challenged on program content. WQAL general manager Goff Lebhar said that in order to meet the FCC's requirement, "[w]e would have to make changes in programming ... we didn't have [the rule] in 1973, and didn't change it in 1976". The National Association of Broadcasters (NAB) petitioned in support of WQAL, saying the hearing could be "... construed to betoken a new era of programming control and censorship". After amending their application to account for 6.79 percent nonentertainment programming, WQAL's license was granted a one-year renewal by December 1978, and a full three-year renewal by July 1980.

SJR divested all but one of their radio stations, including WQAL, to Gulf United Broadcasting in May 1980 as part of a larger $62 million deal. Gulf sold off WQAL to WIN Communications, a locally-run company, on October 8, 1984, for $4.8 million. WIN was headed by former WMMS general manager Walt Tiburski and included area developer Tony Ocepek and Cleveland Browns player Thom Darden as among the core investors. Despite Tiburski's background in rock overseeing WMMS, he promised to maintain WQAL's beautiful music format and beat WDOK in the ratings, saying, "... we feel the area in which we can experience the greatest success is the easy-listening format. I have no torch for rock 'n' roll." Shortly after the purchase was complete at the start of 1985, veteran personality Larry Morrow—a former host at WIXY, WWWE and WERE once dubbed "Mr. Cleveland" by mayor George Voinovich—was hired for morning drive; Tiburski teased the possibility of WIN purchasing additional radio stations.

WQAL was the last station in Cleveland to feature beautiful music after WDOK switched to soft AC in 1987. Even by 1984, industry analysts regarded Cleveland as unusually receptive to beautiful music as other large markets only had one station remaining in the format. WIN sold itself, along with WQAL and four other stations, to M.L. Media Partners LP, a subsidiary of Merrill Lynch, in May 1988 for $48 million; Tiburski and Ocepek agreed to continue operating the stations along with any future M.L. Media purchases. WQAL updated their playlist in early 1989 with a larger amount of vocals, but ratings declined by 2.8 percent between the winter and summer 1989 books.

=== Move to adult contemporary ===
Facing both declining ratings and an increasing amount of advertisers unwilling to associate with the format, WQAL abruptly switched to soft AC on March 31, 1990. Morrow addressed the change on-air by saying, "you told us you wanted the originals rather than the instrumentals". Renamed "Soft Hits 104.1", WQAL registered a service mark for the brand and filed a cease and desist against WDOK from using "soft hits" in their station promos and advertising. WDOK, which branded as "soft favorites", countersued WQAL in Ohio Common Pleas court, causing WQAL to quietly rebrand as "Great Hits 104.1" four weeks later; this led WDOK to host an internal "guess the WQAL slogan contest" among advertising agencies where the winner received $1,002 in cash. Plain Dealer critic David Sowd called the "pillow fight" litigation between the two stations "... a reflection of how wimpy and bland Cleveland radio has become". WQAL's soft AC switch largely flopped as both it and WDOK saw audience declines in the spring 1990 Arbitron ratings, but contemporary-focused WLTF became top-ranked in the market. By July 1990, Walt Tiburski and Tony Ocepek ended their two-year contracts operating the WIN station group on M.L. Media Partners' behalf, and intended to purchase additional stations.

When we were easy listening, much of our presentation was more traditional - a radio version of The Wall Street Journal, if you will. Now we've evolved to more of a USA Today: we're more interesting and exciting and easily digestible.

— Dave Erwin, WQAL program director

Industry veteran Dave Ervin was hired as program director in December 1990; within five weeks, all softer-sounding songs were removed from the playlist and the station was relaunched as "Q104", with WLTF now as their main competition. Ervin considered his arrival to be "the final stage" of WQAL's "evolution" from the beautiful music era to hot AC. Larry Morrow and Jay Lynn were retained in their respective morning and overnight timeslots and were joined with Sally Spitz as Morrow's co-host, Johnny Williams for middays, Dan Deely for afternoons and Jon Russell for evenings. Morrow was called "a gold mine" by Ervin for his tenure in the market and ties to the community, and marketed the station around him; while still successful in mornings, Morrow expressed frustration over having stiff competition from John Lanigan at WMJI and Howard Stern at WNCX, both of whom prevented him from reaching number one like at past stations.

Chancellor Media made three concurrent transactions on August 12, 1998, purchasing WQAL from M.L. Media Partners, WRMR (850 AM) and WDOK from Independent Group Ltd., and WZJM, WZAK and WJMO (1490 AM) from Zapis Communications, all for $275 million: the largest such deal in Cleveland radio history. The joint sale came after ongoing consolidation in the market made it impossible for the other groups to remain competitive. WQAL was described by Plain Dealer critic Roger Brown in April 1996 as "a station in limbo" suggesting M.L. Media would be forced to keep or sell the station. After Independent Group and Zapis failed to close a joint $45 million purchase for WQAL, all three groups united to sell outright. The newly formed cluster was soon joined by WKNR (1220 AM) after Chancellor's merger with Capstar Broadcasting 15 days later forming AMFM, Inc., with 465 stations in their portfolio. Shortly after Chancellor took over WQAL, Morrow's contract was not renewed, ending for him a 33-year career in local radio; his dismissal came alongside similar budget cuts made at WDOK and WRMR.

On October 3, 1999, only 82 days after AMFM, Inc.'s formation, it agreed to be purchased by Clear Channel Communications for $17.4 billion. To meet regulatory approval, WQAL, WZJM and WDOK were sold off to WNCX owner Infinity Broadcasting as part of a larger $1.4 billion, 18-station deal announced on May 6, 2000.

WQAL's studios were moved to WDOK's facilities at "One Radio Lane", off East St. Clair Avenue in Downtown Cleveland, in January 2002. A managerial realignment had Chris Maduri—with WDOK since 1985—become general manager for it and WQAL, while Walt Tiburski held the same role at WNCX and WXTM (the former WZJM); Maduri was also appointed as market manager for all four stations. Maduri treated his role as "still [making] the stations sound like local Ma-and-Pa operations, with local weather, local traffic and local talent." Dave Popovich, a veteran executive at WMJI, WLTF/WMVX and WDOK, was named program director for WQAL and WDOK in February 2006; by then, Infinity Broadcasting was renamed to CBS Radio. WQAL and WDOK moved to the Halle Building on Euclid Avenue, also downtown, on November 13, 2012.

CBS Radio merged with Entercom (renamed Audacy, Inc. in 2021) on February 2, 2017. The merger was approved on November 9, 2017, and was consummated on the 17th. Popovich was promoted to vice president of programming for the four-station cluster prior to retiring in March 2023; Chase Daniels was transferred from Audacy's Madison, Wisconsin, cluster to succeed him.

== Current programming ==
WQAL personalities include Bill Ryan, Alyssa Rose and Mackenzie Pflum in mornings, along with Jenny Lyte in middays and Kelly McMann in afternoons. WQAL's HD2 digital subchannel carries the Channel Q network.
