= WKRK-FM =

Sports radio station in Cleveland Heights, Ohio

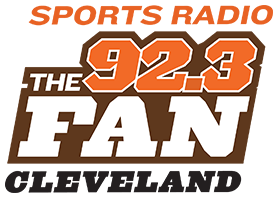
- Cleveland Heights, Ohio; United States
- Broadcast area: Greater Cleveland; Northeast Ohio
- Frequency: 92.3 MHz (HD Radio)
- Branding: Sports Radio 92-3 The Fan

Programming
- Format: Sports radio
- Subchannels: HD2: Westwood One Sports; HD3: Cleveland Browns
- Affiliations: Cleveland Browns Radio Network; Motor Racing Network; Westwood One

Ownership
- Owner: Audacy, Inc.; (Audacy License, LLC)
- Sister stations: WDOK; WNCX; WQAL

History
- First air date: December 19, 1947
- Former call signs: WSRS-FM (1947–1959); WJMO-FM (1959–1960); WCUY (1960–1971); WLYT (1971–1983); WRQC (1983–1990); WJMO-FM (1990–1994); WZJM (1994–2001); WXTM (2001–2006); WXRK (2006–2007); WKRI (2007)
- Former frequencies: 95.3 MHz (1947–59)
- Call sign meaning: former "K-Rock" branding

Technical information
- Licensing authority: FCC
- Facility ID: 74473
- Class: B
- ERP: 40,000 watts (horizontal); 36,000 watts (vertical)
- HAAT: 167 meters (548 ft)
- Transmitter coordinates: 41°26′32″N 81°29′28″W

Links
- Public license information: Public file; LMS
- Webcast: Listen live (via Audacy)
- Website: www.audacy.com/923thefan

WKRK-FM (92.3 FM) is a commercial radio station licensed to Cleveland Heights, Ohio, United States, known as "Sports Radio 92-3 The Fan" and carrying a sports format. Owned by Audacy, Inc., WKRK-FM serves Greater Cleveland and surrounding Northeast Ohio as a co-flagship for the Cleveland Browns Radio Network and an affiliate of Westwood One Sports. WKRK-FM's studios are located at the Halle Building in Downtown Cleveland and the station transmitter resides in the Cleveland suburb of Warrensville Heights. In addition to a standard analog transmission, WKRK-FM broadcasts over three HD Radio channels and is available online via Audacy.

The station originated in 1947 as WSRS-FM, the FM adjunct to WSRS, and initially broadcast at 95.3 FM. When WJMO (1540 AM) owner United Broadcasting purchased WSRS AM/FM, it transferred the WJMO calls and format to the AM facility and relaunched the FM as WCUY with jazz music, followed by a frequency move to 92.3 FM. WCUY became WLYT in 1971 and was subject to frequent format and personnel changes over the next 13 years, concurrent with the Federal Communications Commission (FCC) investigating United Broadcasting and WJMO over various issues. In 1983, the station became WRQC, initially with the "Rock of the 80s" new wave format, then switched to contemporary hits (CHR) several months later. WRQC combined programming with WJMO in 1990 to become "Jammin' 92", with a hybrid urban/CHR format. A contested sale of WJMO AM/FM saw WJMO-FM go to a group led by WZAK personality Lynn Tolliver and owner Lee Zapis and become WZJM in 1994.

Sold as part of a combined buyout of three local groups to Chancellor Broadcasting in 1998, WZJM switched format in May 1999 to urban oldies as "92.3 The Beat". Sold to Infinity Broadcasting in 2000 after a larger sequence of mergers involving Chancellor successor AMFM and Clear Channel Broadcasting, WZJM became active rock WXTM "Xtreme Radio" in 2001; as WXTM, the station launched Rover's Morning Glory, which became regionally syndicated, then was selected in 2006 as one of several replacements for The Howard Stern Show while "Xtreme" adopted the WXRK calls, "K-Rock" name and a more mainline alternative format. Following Rover's departure for WMMS in 2008, the station became WKRK "radio 92.3" with a jockless presentation. The current sports format and "The Fan" branding was adopted in August 2011, and since 2014 has been a co-flagship for the Cleveland Browns.

== History ==
=== 1940s–50s ===
Founded by Sam R. Sague, the station debuted on December 19, 1947, on 95.3 MHz as WSRS-FM and simulcast sister station WSRS (1490 AM), also licensed to Cleveland Heights. WSRS AM/FM billed itself as the "Community Information Voice of Cleveland". On February 1, 1959, Friendly Broadcasting of Columbus assumed control of WSRS 1490 AM and 95.3 FM from Sam R. Sague, switching call letters, licenses, studios and facilities. The AM and FM stations took on separate identities: WJMO took over the former WSRS offices at 2156 Lee Road in Cleveland Heights, and WSRS-FM became WJMO-FM, later WCUY. The 1540 and 106.5 frequencies were sold off to Tuschman Broadcasting Company, with the AM station becoming WABQ while the FM station instead signed on as WABQ-FM.

=== 1960s–70s ===
WCUY maintained an eclectic mix of beautiful music, jazz and ethnic fare independent of the AM station – a rarity at the time. WJMO adopted a rhythm-and-blues format, focusing primarily on the African-American community, which it still does to this day. WCUY vacated 95.3 and moved to 92.3 MHz in the early 1960s, while WDGO in Cleveland signed on the 95.5 frequency and WLKR-FM in Norwalk on the 95.3 frequency. The station's music format turned to all jazz in the mid-1960s. Voices at WCUY's microphones in the mid-1960s until the station dropped jazz in 1971 included: Jim Quinn, Chris Columbi, who also wrote about jazz for The Cleveland Plain Dealer, Ray Allen (who also served as Program Director), Dave Smith, Gary Stark, Mark Kaufman, Len Anthony, Phil Fink, David Mark, and Joanie Layne.

In 1971, WCUY changed calls to WLYT, standing for "We Love You Truly," and chosen through a station contest. WLYT first held a gold-based oldies format, but then bounced about between AOR (as "92 Rock"), automated Top 40, and then disco (as "Disco 92") With Chris Mavros [Michaels] who went to WZZP then WZAK as Production Director and John J. Muddcliff who went to M105 known as the "MUD". WLYT was beset by a poor signal, a limited budget, constant staff turnover, and low ratings during this period.

=== 1980s–90s ===
WLYT changed its call letters to WRQC in spring 1983, and switched to pop/new wave music as "Cleveland's New 92 ROCK", using consultant Rick Carroll of future sister station KROQ-FM in Los Angeles. At the time, Daniel "Dancin' Danny" Wright was the morning drive host. Partly due to a fallout with Carroll, and low ratings against AOR/CHR powerhouse WMMS, WRQC gradually migrated to CHR under new Program Director Kris Earl Phillips (who later departed for a career in the computer software industry, and was succeeded by OM/PD Scott Howitt), with the shift completed that September 5. The line-up included various morning hosts over time after Wright moved over to WGCL (to do afternoons), Jan McKay (Jan Wrezinski/News Director), Linda Jackson (Linda Stepan) middays, Scott Howitt (Program Director) doing afternoon drive, former WBZZ/Pittsburgh air personality Tom "Jack" Daniels" in evenings, Mike Gallagher in nights, Johnny Sharp in late nights, Skip O'Brien, Lew Roberts, "Big Dave" Nicholas, Jim Shea, Scott James (voiceover artist Harry Legg) and "Rowdy Ron" Higgins on weekends. The CHR format remained in place throughout the remainder of the decade, though it would be rebranded a few times, first as 92Q in early 1985, All-Hit 92Q in 1986 (under the guidance of the late Rick Sklar, former WABC/New York program director turned consultant), and later as Hot 92 in 1989, with the station briefly leaning toward urban.

United Broadcasting changed WRQC's call sign to WJMO-FM on January 22, 1990, matching the calls of WJMO, marking the second time around with these call letters. The station was re-branded "Jammin' 92", and began simulcasting WJMO part-time before dropping the simulcasts in October of that year. In 1995, the station rebranded as "Jammin' 92.3", and kept the contemporary hits format, except this time around, they shifted towards a Dance-leaning direction, a move that would pay off ratings-wise for the station, all under the direction of its then PD, Keith Clark. Slogans over the years included "Cleveland's New Dance Music Station", "The Party Pig", "Big Fun-Giant Jams", and "Cleveland's New #1 Hit Music Station."

Starting in 1993, Jammin' 92's evening hours were modeled after MTV, featuring equal doses of alternative rock, hip-hop, and pop music. The show was called "92 Channel X." In 1992, as Federal Communications Commission (FCC) ownership rules were relaxed, United Broadcasting sold WJMO and WJMO-FM to Zebra Communications, owned by three key figures from local urban contemporary station WZAK: Owner Xenophon Zapis, program director Lynn Tolliver, and on-air personality Bobby (Otis) Rush. Although Tolliver and Rush were both African Americans, Zapis, a Greek, was a key party in the new ownership. The Southern Christian Leadership Conference (SCLC) contested the sale.

The sale was approved by the FCC in 1993, and WJMO became the first radio station with significant African American ownership in the Cleveland area. On February 25, 1994, as a result of the legal battles, the SCLC gained significant control of WJMO, which was seen as the less desirable station.

The SCLC kept the WJMO call letters for their AM station, and WJMO-FM became WZJM, a combination of WZAK and WJMO. WZJM's format evolved into Rhythmic CHR and it became one of the highest rated stations in Cleveland during the late 1990s with air personalities Joe "Mama" in the Morning, Big Dave, Don "Action" Jackson, LeeAnn Sommers, Howard Perl, Dean Rufus, Scott Free, Bobby Blaze and Chuck Booms. The station was listed as a Top 40/CHR reporter in music reporting trades like Billboard Radio Monitor (now defunct), because of WZJM's inclusion of mainstream pop/rock product into its playlist, and at the same time, keep from overlapping WZAK when it came to playing R&B/Hip-Hop product and targeting the African American audience."WZJM 92.3 Cleveland Heights Cleveland, OH 4 July 1995".

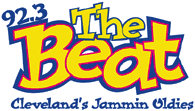
Logo as 92.3 The Beat

From 1998 to 2001, WZJM suffered through multiple ownership changes and different formats. This started when WZJM, WJMO and WZAK were purchased by Chancellor Media in January 1999, along with WDOK, WQAL, and WRMR (850 AM) in a $275 million deal. It was, at the time, the largest radio deal in Cleveland broadcasting history. On July 13, 1999, Chancellor Media merged with Capstar Broadcasting, owners of WKNR (1220 AM), becoming AMFM Inc., becoming, at that time, the nation's largest radio station owner with 465 stations. When AMFM merged with Clear Channel Communications in August 2000, Clear Channel was forced to sell off WZJM along with the other Cleveland AMFM properties to comply with market ownership restrictions. WZJM, WDOK and WQAL were sold to Infinity Broadcasting, later becoming CBS Radio in 2005.

On the air, WZJM abruptly dropped its contemporary hits format at 5:00 pm on April 19, 1999. In its place was the AMFM-branded "Jammin' Oldies" format as "92.3 The Beat". While "Jammin' Oldies" was popular in the short term in other markets across the country, WZJM's attempt was not successful in comparison. As WZJM was sold to Infinity, speculation grew about a potential format change, particularly when all but two of the station's disk jockeys were let go in early 2001.

=== 2000s ===
On May 25, 2001, at 9:30 a.m., WZJM flipped to active rock as "92.3 Xtreme Radio" with the call letters WXTM (adopted on June 7, 2001). While the rock format helped fill the gap after WENZ flipped from modern rock to urban in 1999, WXTM's "Xtreme" format and on-air presentation were originally quite different from the old WENZ, and was, in fact, a nationally programmed format developed by Infinity Broadcasting. WXTM was the Cleveland affiliate for New York-based shock jocks Opie and Anthony from July 2001 until their firing by CBS Radio in August 2002. Rover's Morning Glory, hosted by Shane "Rover" French, debuted on WXTM on March 24, 2003 (and received its title just days beforehand). It would become the first radio show in modern history to have even been syndicated out of Cleveland, when WMAD in Madison, Wisconsin and WAZU in Columbus, Ohio both picked up the show.

In 2005, the "Xtreme" label was shed in favor of "923X", and former WENZ disk jockeys re-emerged on WXTM during several "Smells Like the End" reunion weekends. The playlist was slowly expanded as the station became a full-fledged alternative rock station. Rover made national headlines when he was selected by CBS Radio to be one of four shows to replace Howard Stern (the other three being Adam Carolla, The Junkies and David Lee Roth) with CBS Radio's "Free FM" experiment. Rover had his show's flagship relocated to Chicago on sister station WCKG in order to accommodate this switch, but continued to air in Cleveland.

On January 1, 2006, WXTM's sister station WXRK in New York (now WINS-FM) changed its callsign to WFNY-FM to reflect its new format. CBS Radio then moved the WXRK call letters to WXTM. The new WXRK of Cleveland was suddenly set on "random play," essentially a wide-sweeping commercial modern rock playlist without any dee-jays. On-air promos hinted of "92.3: It just Rocks," before the station officially became "92.3 K-Rock" that January 17. K-Rock has been a brand utilized by CBS Radio on several of their rock stations, most notably KROQ in Los Angeles. Incidentally, KROQ was also the station that what was then WRQC tried to emulate back in the 1980s.

Opie and Anthony rejoined the station's lineup on April 26, 2006, when they were hired back to replace David Lee Roth on CBS Radio stations in select markets in morning drive. However, WXRK – and not local Roth affiliate WNCX – picked up the Free FM-based portion of the show, on tape delay from 3:00 pm to 6:00 pm. WCKG would cancel Rover, due to extremely low ratings, on July 31, 2006, and Rover's show returned to WXRK's studios as its flagship. Also that day, K-Rock launched its HD2 station "K2", on the station's secondary HD signal. "K2" featured bands like Godsmack, Slipknot, Static-X, Disturbed, and other harder-edged acts. On November 14, 2006, K-Rock began an online stream, accessible at its official site, krockcleveland.com. Meanwhile, the former WXRK in New York changed formats on May 25, 2007, from hot talk back over to alternative rock under the "92.3 K-Rock" name, and as a result, would reacquire the WXRK call letters. The Cleveland station retained the format and name, but on May 31, took a new callsign of WKRI. The station gained its tenth set of call letters that October 3 when they obtained the WKRK-FM calls from the Detroit station now known as WXYT-FM.

Logo as Radio 92.3

Rover's Morning Glory would be abruptly canceled from WKRK-FM on February 15, 2008, after a new contract between Rover and CBS Radio could not be reached. Rover ended up signing a deal with WMMS; as a result, WKRK-FM moved Opie and Anthony to morning drive and started to lean the active rock route by adding artists such as Mötley Crüe, Ozzy Osbourne, and Guns N' Roses onto the rotation to better compete with WMMS. WKRK-FM ultimately suffered a significant decline in ratings.

On December 1, 2008, WKRK-FM dropped the K-Rock branding and switched to "Radio 92.3", while retaining the modern rock format. All DJs were dropped or reassigned to off-air roles, and Opie and Anthony were dropped from morning drive. As "Radio 92.3", WKRK-FM continued to serve as the home of Inner Sanctum, a weekly showcase featuring Cleveland's local music talent. Inner Sanctum aired its final show on WKRK-FM on August 28, 2011.

=== 92.3 The Fan ===
WKRK-FM dropped both the "Radio 92.3" brand and alternative rock format from its primary broadcast feed (analog/HD1) on August 29, 2011, at 6 am; the final song to air before the format flip was "Second Chance" by Shinedown. The station has since aired a sports radio format over the primary feed as "Sports Radio 92.3 The Fan". Both the "Radio 92.3" brand and format continued on the HD2 digital subchannel until January 2, 2013, when the feed switched over to CBS Sports Radio. In March 2013, WKRK-FM announced that it would begin broadcasting "a 24-hour dedicated Browns HD multicast" on a new HD3 digital subchannel at an unspecified date. The HD3 subchannel eventually signed on during the summer of 2013.

Morning co-host Chuck Booms, who had been with the station since the sports format launch in August 2011, was let go in May 2015. Regarding the future of the WKRK-FM morning show, program director Andy Roth stated his intent to hire a replacement "soon" - and eventually moved evening host Ken Carman full-time to mornings.

In January 2016, Kevin Kiley made headlines after publicly criticizing the Buffalo Bills for hiring a female assistant coach. In an interview during the February 11 evening sportscast on Cleveland TV station WUAB, Kiley had said he was being censored by CBS Radio over his comments, and announced he would be resigning from WKRK. On April 6, 2016, WOIO reported that former morning show producer J.G. Spooner had been arrested and charged with money laundering via the website GoFundMe; Cleveland Scene speculated that Spooner exited the station due to the arrest. On February 2, 2017, Spooner was sentenced to thirty months in prison.

On February 2, 2017, CBS Radio announced it would merge with Entercom. The merger was approved on November 9, 2017, and was consummated on the 17th. Entercom rebranded as Audacy on March 30, 2021.

== Current programming ==
=== Regular schedule ===
WKRK features local hosts during the bulk of the day on weekdays, including Ken Carman and Anthony Lima (morning drive), Andy Baskin and Jeff Phelps (middays), Nick Wilson and Jonathan Peterlin (afternoons), and Jake Vulinec (weeknights).

Westwood One Sports programming airs overnights on weekdays and the bulk of the day on weekends.

=== Play-by-play ===
WKRK-FM is a co-flagship station for the Cleveland Browns, sharing coverage with sister station WNCX, as well as cross-town rival WKNR, and also serves as the Cleveland affiliate for Westwood One's national coverage of the NFL and NCAA football and basketball, as well as NASCAR coverage from the Motor Racing Network (MRN). During Browns season, WKRK-FM is the flagship home of the Browns Radio Network postgame show.
