= WENZ =

Urban radio station in Cleveland, Ohio

- Cleveland, Ohio; United States
- Broadcast area: Greater Cleveland; Northeast Ohio
- Frequency: 107.9 MHz (HD Radio)
- Branding: Z 107.9

Programming
- Format: Mainstream urban
- Subchannels: HD2: Urban gospel "Praise 94.5"

Ownership
- Owner: Urban One; (Blue Chip Broadcasting Licenses, Ltd)
- Sister stations: WERE; WJMO; WZAK

History
- First air date: July 14, 1959
- Former call signs: WNOB (1958–70); WELW-FM (1970–75); WDMT (1975–87); WPHR (1987–92)
- Call sign meaning: former "The End" branding

Technical information
- Licensing authority: FCC
- Facility ID: 2685
- Class: B
- ERP: 16,000 watts (horizontal); 15,000 watts (vertical)
- HAAT: 272 meters (892 ft)
- Transmitter coordinates: 41°27′54.00″N 81°17′13.00″W
- Translator: HD2: 94.5 W233CG (Cleveland)

Links
- Public license information: Public file; LMS
- Webcast: Listen live; Listen live (via TuneIn)
- Website: zhiphopcleveland.com praisecleveland.com

WENZ (107.9 FM) is a commercial mainstream urban radio station licensed to Cleveland, Ohio, serving Greater Cleveland and much of surrounding Northeast Ohio. The station is owned by Urban One since 1999, its studios are located on Oak Tree Blvd in the former iHeartMedia facility and studios in Independence, Ohio, while the station transmitter resides in Russell Township in Geauga County. Besides a standard analog transmission, WENZ broadcasts over two HD Radio channels, and is available online. WENZ was the official first Hip-Hop urban contemporary radio station in the market in the city Cleveland, Ohio.

== History ==
=== Early years ===
The station debuted on July 14, 1959 as WNOB; it was started by Northern Ohio Broadcasting, whose principals were several people from WNEW in New York. When the companion AM license was not granted, the station found itself in a precarious position, because standalone FM stations in the 1950s did not make money.

In 1961, the station filed for bankruptcy. A machine operator, Phillip Kerwin, purchased WNOB for $16,000. In 1963, WNOB became one of the first FM stations in the US to broadcast in stereo. In 1968, the signal was upgraded; the station purchased a new transmitter and antenna system. Two years later, in 1970, Multicom Inc. (owner of WELW AM 1330 in Willoughby, Ohio) purchased the station for $330,000. The call letters were then changed to WELW-FM. WELW played a top 40 Drake type format for almost two years, then switched to country music.

=== Disco 108 WDMT/FM 108 WDMT Your Power Station ===
In 1975, Beasley Broadcast Group purchased the station from Multicom for $550,000, and changed the call letters to WDMT (which is short for "We're DynoMite!", "Dynomite!" being a well-known catchphrase by comic and actor Jimmie "Kid Dynomite" Walker on the popular TV sitcom Good Times). The next year, the station switched to the then-popular Disco format and took the moniker "Disco 108 WDMT." By 1978, WDMT evolved to a hybrid CHR/Urban Contemporary format, also known as "CHUrban" (which would be the forerunner to what is now known as Rhythmic contemporary), as "FM 108 WDMT Your Power Station". WDMT was Cleveland's first-ever CHUrban radio station.

During the WDMT era the station aired "The WDMT's Club Style", where street DJs from Cleveland received opportunities to mix live on the air. Caroline Ford, Freddie James, Steve Szabo, Brenda & Michael Love, Matthew Morgan, Lady Skill, Hot Rod See, with Dean Rufus, and the legendary Ronnie "The Ghoul" Sweed were popular WDMT DJs during this period. In 1985, the entire WDMT air staff appeared with Arsenio Hall on the first 'Urban Music Awards' show.

=== Power 108 FM ===
Power 108 logo

On April 9, 1987, the station changed call letters to WPHR, flipped to a Top 40/CHR format, and rebranded as "Power 108 FM". As a CHR station, the station broadcast at 16,500 watts, from a new 730 foot tower, which covered the entirety of the Cleveland and Akron markets, as well as secondary coverage for most of the Canton and Youngstown markets. In 1988, the station was sold to Ardman Broadcasting for $2.8 million. "Power Jocks" during this period included Program Director and DJ Steven "Big Steve Kelly" Szabo, Calvin Hicks, Jimmy Bosh, Maria Farina, Elizabeth "Liz" Luke, John Records Landecker, Gina St. John, Cat Thomas, Rick Michaels, Cathy Cruise, Scotty James, Mark Allen, Edward "Downtown Eddie" Brown, with James "Jammin' Jimmy" Hart, and Sonny Joe Fox among others. WPHR moved its studios to Playhouse Square in late 1988.

=== 107.9 The End ===
107.9 The End logo

On May 12, 1992, the station changed its callsign to WENZ and flipped its format to alternative rock, branding itself as "107.9 The End". Both the branding and callsign reflected the station's position on the FM dial. In March 1996, Ardman would sell the station to Clear Channel Communications. Both the inception and the demise of The End were stunted: with both format changes, the station broadcast a 24-hour loop of R.E.M.'s song "It's the End of the World as We Know It (And I Feel Fine)". A documentary film made about The End, entitled The End of the World As We Knew It, was released in 2009 and featured many of the former staffers and jocks. On February 25, 2020, "The End" was re-launched as an internet radio station under the management of former station producer, Dan Binder.

=== Z 107.9 Hip-Hop ===
As part of divestitures required by federal agencies to approve Clear Channel's purchase of Jacor, WENZ was purchased by Radio One on January 15, 1999. Radio One's station portfolio and programming philosophy targeted African American communities. As a result, WENZ dropped their modern rock format for mainstream urban featuring hip-hop and R&B on May 14, 1999, taking the "KISS 107.9" brand. One week later, Lorain–licensed WZLE (104.9 FM), itself now under Clear Channel ownership, switched formats from Contemporary Christian to CHR as "Kiss 104.9", then filed a cease and desist order against Radio One for usage of the "KISS-FM" brand, which Clear Channel claimed ownership of in the state of Ohio. WENZ rebranded to "Z 107.9" on September 1, 1999, resolving the dispute. Radio One was renamed Urban One in May 2018.

== Current programming ==
WENZ is the Cleveland affiliate of the nationally syndicated Morning Hustle (via Syndication One). The rest of the day features local program The Day Party with Ro Digga middays, Urban One syndicated Posted On The Corner with Incognito and DJ Misses in afternoon drive, and local DJ Crisis evenings.
