= WHLO =

Radio station in Akron, Ohio

- Akron, Ohio; United States
- Broadcast area: Akron metro area; Canton metro area
- Frequency: 640 kHz
- Branding: 640 WHLO

Programming
- Format: Conservative talk
- Affiliations: Fox News Radio; Premiere Networks

Ownership
- Owner: iHeartMedia, Inc.; (iHM Licenses, LLC)
- Sister stations: WHOF; WKDD; WRQK-FM

History
- First air date: January 7, 1927 (Note: In Cleveland; station moved to Akron, Ohio, on February 25, 1945.)
- Former call signs: WJAY (1927–1937); WCLE (1937–1945); WHKK (1945–1960)
- Former frequencies: 688 kHz (1927); 680 kHz (1927); 1320 kHz (1927–1928); 1450 kHz (1928–1929); 620 kHz (1929–1930); 610 kHz (1930–1944)
- Call sign meaning: "Hello"

Technical information
- Licensing authority: FCC
- Facility ID: 43858
- Class: B
- Power: 5,000 watts (day); 500 watts (night)
- Transmitter coordinates: 41°04′47.00″N 81°38′45.00″W

Links
- Public license information: Public file; LMS
- Webcast: Listen live (via iHeartRadio)
- Website: 640whlo.iheart.com

WHLO (640 AM) is a commercial radio station licensed to Akron, Ohio, United States, featuring a conservative talk format. Owned by iHeartMedia, the station serves the Akron and Canton metro areas with programming from Fox News Radio and Premiere Networks. WHLO's studios are located in North Canton and its transmitter is sited in Copley Township. Along with a standard analog transmission, WHLO is available online via iHeartRadio.

WHLO began broadcasting in January 1927 as WJAY in Cleveland, Ohio, on an unconventional frequency of 688 kHz. Zenith Electronics, owner of WJAZ in Chicago, was a backing investor of WJAY during its first year on air. After the creation of the Federal Radio Commission (FRC), WJAY was moved twice in May 1927, the second move ended up as a timeshare with WFJC in Akron. The FRC proposed moving WJAY to a timeshare with WHK at 1390 kHz in late 1928, but WHK successfully objected to this proposal and remained full-time. WJAY was instead moved to 1450 kHz again timesharing with WFJC, to 620 kHz several months later after heterodyne interference impaired it and WHK, and finally to 610 kHz as 1930 began. WJAY was taken over by the president of the Knight-Norris-Gibbs real estate firm in 1928. When the firm went bankrupt in 1930, a receivership lawsuit ended up with the station being sold to hardware store owner Frank Potter and then to businessman Monroe Rubin.

WJAY became part of a complex three-station frequency swap attempt between it, WAIU in Columbus and WKBN in Youngstown, proposed in 1934 by The Plain Dealer, who controlled WHK. The Federal Communications Commission (FCC) rejected the frequency swaps in 1936 but did accept the Plain Dealer's purchase of WJAY under their United Broadcasting division. WJAY began using WHK's Higbee Building studios and transmitter site in Seven Hills. A network affiliation realignment in 1937 had WJAY renamed WCLE and picking up the Mutual Broadcasting System affiliation alongside WHK, which joined the Blue Network. WCLE originated several programs for Mutual, had an emphasis on ethnic and block programming and aired Cleveland Indians games from 1938 to 1944.

WCLE and WHK jointly became the market's Mutual affiliate in 1942, precipitating WJW's move from Akron to Cleveland primarily to carry Blue programs. In turn, United filed to relocate WCLE to Akron in February 1945 as WHKK, satiating the FCC's newly-enacted duopoly restrictions. United also swapped frequencies between WHKK and WHKC, moving WHKK to 640 kHz and allowing WHKC to go full-time at 610 kHz. WHKK continued as the Mutual affiliate for Akron, with studios at the O'Neil's Building. Cliff Rodgers became one of the first personalities in Ohio radio to showcase country music through his daily programs that ran from 1945 to 1957. United spun WHKK off to two WHK executives, Jackson Maurer and Philip Herbert, in 1952. Under their ownership, WHKK dropped most Mutual non-news programs in late 1956 to focus on popular music and local news.

In 1959, Susquehanna Radio Corporation bought the station, which became WHLO the following year. WHLO thrived with Top 40 throughout much of the 1960s, then gravitated to local talk radio by the mid-1970s. Faltering against stiff competition from WAKR and emerging stations on the FM dial, the station was unable to broadcast at night after Pacific Time Zone sunset until 1980. Upon adopting a 24-hour schedule as 1981 began, WHLO switched to all-news in the daytime and talk at night, only to abandon it for adult standards after five months, resulting in a series of personnel and management changes. Susquehanna sold WHLO in 1984 to WZAK owner Trans World Broadcasting, who instituted a Christian contemporary format. WTOF owner Mortenson Broadcasting took over WHLO in 1987 and moved the station to Christian adult contemporary with some talk and preaching shows. Mortenson sold WHLO and WTOF in 1997 to Salem Communications, which purchased WHK the previous year. Following a major station/asset swap in July 2001, Clear Channel (now iHeartMedia) purchased WHLO and launched their current talk format in June 2002 largely focused on syndicated shows and occasional local content.

== Cleveland origins as WJAY ==
The Hollenden Hotel, c. 1925, original studio and transmitter site for WJAY.

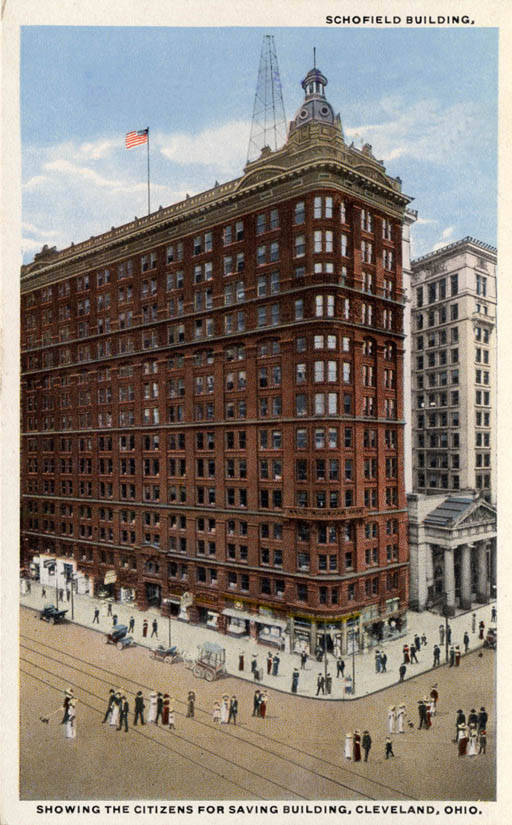
The Schofield Building, c. 1913. The rooftop radio mast was built by the United Wireless Telegraph Company in 1909 and used by WJAY from 1928 to 1936.

The station was launched in Cleveland, Ohio, as WJAY on January 7, 1927, owned by the Cleveland Radio Broadcasting Corp., a division of the Zenith Electronics Company, owner of WJAZ in Chicago. WJAY signed on during a chaotic period when most government regulation had been suspended and new stations were free to be set up with few restrictions. WJAY transmitted on a self-assigned frequency of 435.7 meters (688.1 kHz) with studios and transmitter located at the Hollenden Hotel. Guy Lombardo, already a performer at WTAM, joined WJAY at launch for an additional weekly music program. WJAY intended to broadcast with 5,000 watts, which would have been more powerful than WTAM's then-power of 3,500 watts. However, WJAY only was able to operate with 1,000 watts but was still heard throughout much of the eastern United States. WJAY established a link with WJAZ in Chicago and also sought an affiliation with NBC's WJZ chain, which ultimately deferred to sign a Cleveland affiliate as neither WJAY or WHK transmitted with 5,000 watts, the network's threshold.

Following the formation of the Federal Radio Commission (FRC), a series of temporary authorizations were issued beginning on May 3, 1927, with WJAY reassigned to the more traditional 680 kHz. The FRC originally intended WJAY to timeshare with WHK on 1130 kHz when issuing the first major frequency reassignment on June 1, 1927, but WJAY instead shared time with WFJC in Akron on 1320 kHz, an arrangement that did not please either station. WJAY was one of 164 stations named in the FRC's General Order 32, which threatened to deny their permanent license applications for failing to meet a "public interest, convenience, or necessity" standard now set by the FRC. WJAY successfully petitioned the FRC during a July 1928 public hearing that it should remain licensed.

A restructuring in early 1928 saw area real estate firm The Knight-Norris-Gibbs Company assume control of WJAY; Knight-Norris-Gibbs president J. H. Jones, Jr. became president of the station and Frank Potter, a hardware store owner, became station treasurer. WJAY's studios were moved to the Knight-Norris-Gibbs offices in the Wurlitzer Building, then to the top floor of the Schofield Building, along with their transmitter relocated from the Hollenden. The wire antenna on the Schofield was constructed in 1909 by United Wireless Telegraph Company for experimental wireless radio transmissions.

On November 11, 1928, the FRC implemented a major reallocation of station transmitting frequencies, as part of a reorganization resulting from its implementation of General Order 40. WJAY was assigned to 1390 kHz in a timeshare with WHK, but after WHK protested this, WJAY was moved to 1450 kHz, again in a timeshare with WFJC. This move immediately resulted in heterodyne interference from both WJAY and WHK. By March 1929, the FRC moved WJAY to 620 kHz (Note: WFJC remained at 1450 kHz after WJAY moved, but in a timeshare with WCSO in Springfield, Ohio.) which resolved the issues with WHK but created pre- and post-sunset interference with WTMJ in Milwaukee. To alleviate the interference with WTMJ, WJAY moved again on January 1, 1930, to 610 kHz, narrowly beating WAIU in Columbus, which sought the same frequency.

=== Takeover by Frank Potter ===
Jones resigned as president of WJAY on March 27, 1930, and was succeeded by William R. Orr. Jones's departure precipitated the bankruptcy of Knight-Norris-Gibbs three weeks later, a casualty of the Great Depression. Despite this, Orr began spending on a rebuilding of WJAY's studios and transmitter and took over operations of WALR in Zanesville in July 1930. Orr sought to purchase WALR and construct a station in Toledo with aspirations of an eight-station network operating on the same frequency.

Potter filed a receivership lawsuit against Orr and secretary Clayton Townes, alleging Orr and Townes purchased common and preferred stock in the station in violation of state law and that additional stock had been issued without proper compensation. Common Pleas Judge George P. Baer issued a temporary injunction against Orr and Townes preventing them from selling or purchasing stock; three days later, he issued an injunction preventing Orr's removal as president. The latter was delivered by a deputy sheriff to WJAY's studios one minute before a board meeting was to begin. Potter obtained another injunction against the board two weeks later after learning Orr had support of the station's directors and could oust him. On October 11, 1930, Potter acquired majority control of WJAY, and Orr and Townes resigned, ending all litigation.

WJAY held an option to purchase WALR and in November 1930 transferred it to an Akron group that sought to move it to that city, and WALR owner Roy W. Waller filed to sell WALR to the Akron concern. WJAY ceded control of WALR back to Waller at the end of 1930, having lost $5,000 in five months. Townes filed for a temporary injunction to prevent a sale claiming the option was in his name and not the station's. Unsuccessful in obtaining an injunction, Townes became part of a Cleveland group seeking the frequency for a new Cleveland station; this, along with the Akron group and a Zanesville group vying for the frequency, resulted in a combined hearing on them and WALR's license by the FRC. The FRC denied Waller's request to sell WALR on December 31, 1931.

WJAY distinguished itself with ethnic block programming, starting in 1929 when Stanley Altschuler joined as the "International Tenor". Altschuler oversaw development of specialized programs based on ethnicity, and striving for authenticity. Wayne Mack began his 67-year broadcasting career in 1931 as an ethnic announcer at WJAY, and with Frederick Wolf, co-founded WDOK in 1950. While not linked with a major chain, WJAY affiliated with the short-lived American Broadcasting System, operated by Fort Industry Broadcasting owner George B. Storer, at the start of 1935. WJAY also carried various regionally-syndicated programs. Potter controlled WJAY until an illness-induced retirement; Monroe F. Rubin, married to Potter's daughter, took over as majority owner by 1932.

=== Attempted frequency realignment and purchase by the Plain Dealer ===
Rumors of WJAY being purchased by WHK as a secondary outlet had been hinted at by Cleveland Press columnist Norman Siegel as early as March 1933. By February 1934, Siegel reported the deal was "on the completion point". Announced one month later, WHK's purchase of WJAY was tied to the potential creation of a statewide radio network. WJAY, along with WAIU in Columbus and WKBN in Youngstown, proposed a three-way frequency swap to the FRC in 1934: WJAY would take WAIU's frequency of 640 kHz, WAIU would take WKBN's frequency of 570 kHz, and WKBN would move to 610 kHz, with WAIU and WKBN operating full-time and WJAY until Los Angeles sunset. Additionally, The Plain Dealer, owner of WHK and WAIU, would acquire majority control of WJAY and pledging $25,000 in escrow to construct a new transmitter for WKBN. Rubin would maintain a 25 percent minority stake in WJAY and acquire stakes in WHK and WAIU.

Along with the support of civic leaders, WHK aimed to create a statewide network with WAIU and WKBN, and use WJAY's nighttime hours for educational fare. WJAY's move to 640 kHz drew an objection by KFI, the clear-channel station on that frequency, and WKBN's move to 610 kHz was opposed by WDAF in Kansas City despite WKBN proposing to use a directional antenna. The Federal Communications Commission (FCC) designated the moves for hearing in October 1934. During the hearings, the Plain Dealer proposed the creation of United Broadcasting for WHK and WAIU (heretofore held under separate PD-controlled companies) and to acquire WJAY and 40 percent of WKBN stock. Legal counsel for the stations argued the frequency swap would benefit listeners in Cleveland, Columbus and Youngstown. Paperwork was filed with the FCC on September 23, 1935, to create United Broadcasting, merging WJAY into WHK; WJAY would operate as an overflow for CBS programming WHK was previously unable to air, have new studios at WHK's facilities at the Higbee Building and move their transmitter to WHK's site in Seven Hills.

During the sale, WJAY debuted "The Ghost Reporter" in March 1936, a daily investigative journalism series of political news and gossip with the identity of the host intentionally withheld. On one broadcast, names of bookies and slot machine operators were divulged to Cleveland safety director Eliot Ness, resulting in multiple raids by Cleveland police. Rubin's home was bombed with he and his children in it, causing $300 in damages; Rubin originally believed the bombing to be mistaken identity but regarded it as a response to the broadcast. Rubin cancelled the "Ghost Reporter" after the bombing and fired three staffers, saying "we are not in the reform business any more". WJAY reinstated the program one week later but was placed under a "constructive policy" focused on topical stories and crusading for "good clean fun".

=== WCLE and United ownership ===
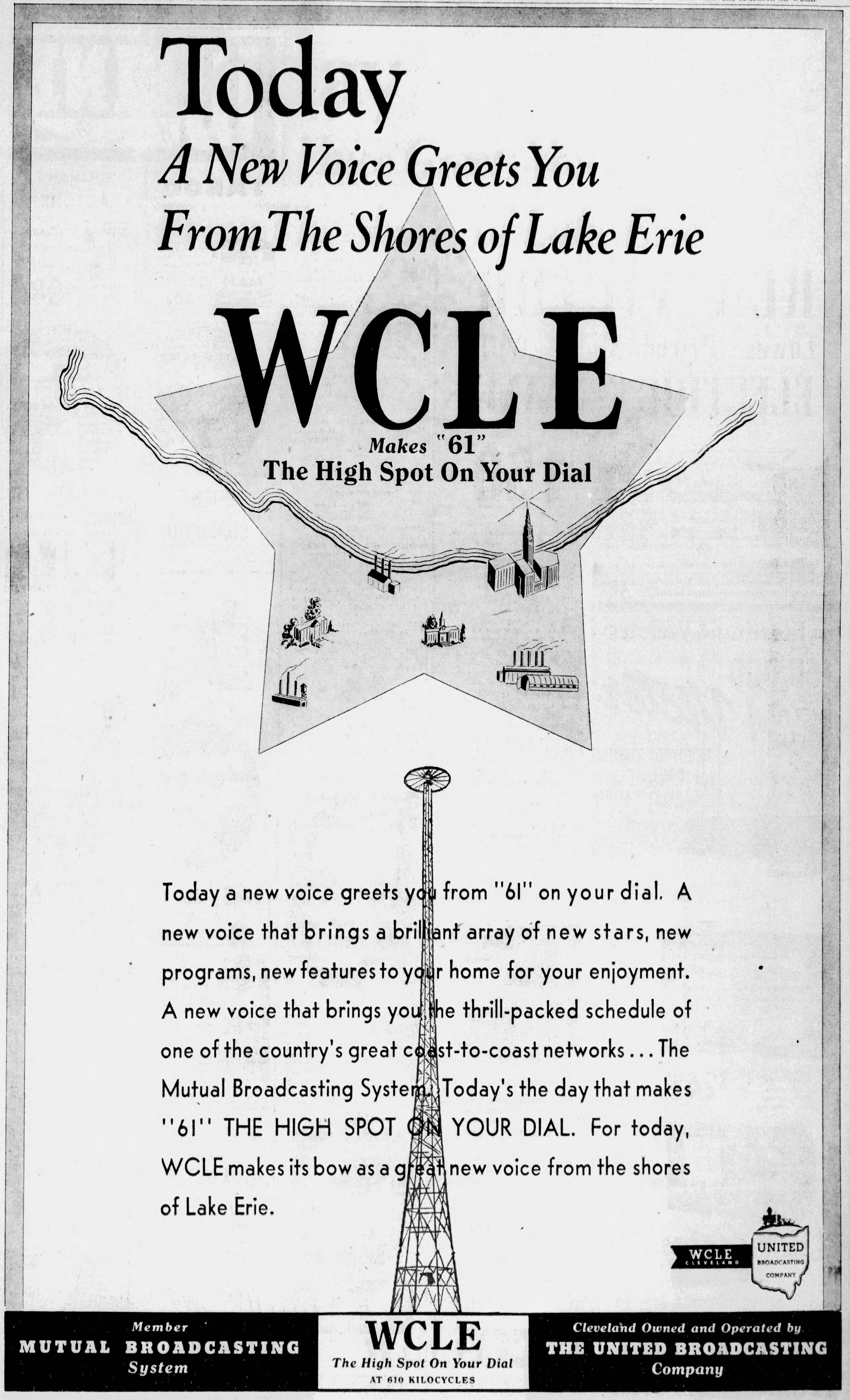
Newspaper advertisement for WJAY's change to WCLE on September 26, 1937

The FCC rejected the three-way frequency swap on May 1, 1936, but approved the sale of WJAY to United on May 29 after also designating it for hearing. Prior to approval, WJAY moved to facilities in the Carnegie Hall Building on 1220 Huron Road. Rubin maintained a nominal stake in the station group until his 1948 death. The station's transmitter moved to the WHK's Seven Hills site in late October 1936, topped with a wagon-wheel antenna, and their former wire antenna at the Schofield was dismantled. Studios were moved again to the Higbee Building on October 25, 1936, with a master control monitoring the air feeds of both stations simultaneously. Both stations also acquired a dedicated automobile and two two-way radio mobile units for remote broadcasts.

Most of the CBS programming WJAY picked up were sustaining programs with no advertising, while WJAY dropped all other non-CBS networked programs, including Remington Rand's News Comes To Life; management also hoped to launch additional local shows for WJAY. The takeover also saw a restructuring of WJAY's ethnic programming, with English-language announcements and utilizing WHK-WJAY's studio orchestra exclusively, this caused several ethnic groups to support construction of a fifth radio station in Cleveland. The Nationality Broadcasting Association was formed in December 1936 to produce five nationality programs for WGAR, all of which were hosted by former WJAY staff. Concurrently, WHK-WJAY revised their policies to include bilingual announcements and musicians from various groups, and instituted a new announcer lineup.

Norman Siegel reported in the Press on August 17, 1936, that WJAY was to be renamed WHKO following WAIU's renaming to WHKC; WKBN would also be renamed WHKY. By November, Siegel stated the change to WHKO could happen "any day now". WJAY's call sign remained in place until September 26, 1937, when it switched to WCLE. The renaming was timed directly with WCLE joining the Mutual Broadcasting System and WHK affiliating with Mutual and NBC Blue. CBS moved their affiliation to WGAR. Mutual conducted a two-day salute with key stations throughout the network welcoming in both stations. WCLE picked up Cleveland Indians broadcasts beginning with the 1938 season, taking over for WHK. (Note: This was not the first time the station sought to carry Cleveland Indians games. In April 1932, WJAY staged a play-by-play recreation of an Indians game WHK carried live hours earlier. WJAY abandoned this after WHK threatened to protest against the station before the FRC.)

== Becoming Akron's third radio station ==
United continued to seek increased air time for WCLE. On March 28, 1940, United filed paperwork for another frequency swap, this time a straight swap between WCLE and WHKC and power increases for both stations. By December 1940, WCLE additionally applied to move to 600 kHz full-time with the goal of carrying the entire Mutual schedule and WHK carrying the entire Blue lineup; both stations were tasked with clearing as much network programming as possible while also maintaining local output. The Mutual affiliation was moved to WHK on September 28, 1942: announced in March, United cited Mutual's ability to distribute shows that originated from WHK-WCLE for a national audience, including the daily Mutual Goes Calling. United also held an ownership stake in the network proportionate to WHK, WCLE and WHKC's affiliations when capital stock was issued in 1940. Around 300 guests were present for a 45-minute celebratory broadcast at the WHK-WCLE studios.

While WHK planned to continue carrying select Blue shows, speculation centered on an existing station relocating to Cleveland to carry the network full-time. WJW filed with the FCC in November 1942 to relocate from Akron to Cleveland, citing it would be able to serve as the market's permanent Blue affiliate. While they received approval to move several weeks later, complication due to World War II delayed the move until November 15, 1943. An attempt by WJW to construct a replacement station with their prior 1240 kHz facilities failed when WGAR secured a frequency move to 1220 kHz, leaving Akron with two radio stations: WAKR and WADC.

United withdrew their WCLE and WHKC frequency swap request on October 6, 1943, but filed another request on December 20, this time with WCLE relocated to Akron and renamed WHKK, retaining WCLE's on- and off-air staff. This proposal was rooted in rules adopted by the FCC in August 1941 that restricted licensees from operating more than one radio station in a city. As Akron was 27 miles (43 km) from Cleveland, the move satiated those requirements and a May 1944 deadline to address said duopolies. The FCC approved the proposal on May 16, 1944, with an initial target date of late fall, after the 1944 Indians season concluded: WCLE resumed carrying the games (with WHK carrying night and Sunday doubleheaders) one month into the season due to difficulty securing a sponsorship.

=== Relaunch as WHKK ===
By late July 1944, WCLE had a projected move date of October 1 but was delayed until the start of 1945, with WHKK confirmed as the new Mutual affiliate for Akron. Studios were constructed at the O'Neil Building in Akron's downtown and a transmitter on Akron-Peninsula Road (near the present Cuyahoga Valley National Park) The move was delayed again to February 1945; in the event of another delay, United planned to continue operating the station as WCLE with no advertising. WCLE signed off for the last time at 610 kHz at 6 p.m. on February 24, 1945. The following evening, at 6:40 p.m., WHKK signed on at 640 kHz with an opening gala broadcast at the Goodyear Theater featuring a cameo appearance by the Cleveland Orchestra minutes into the broadcast. Approximately 2,000 people attended the broadcast; the station also awarded a $100 war bond to an infant whose birth time was closest to 6:40 p.m.

Much of WCLE's local programs, including the ethnic shows, moved to WHK, but the Indians were unable to have radio broadcasts for the 1945 season due to WHK's Mutual commitments. WHKK's new frequency of 640 kHz allowed it to remain on the air until Pacific Time Zone sunset in order to protect KFI; after local sunset, WHKK's signal was receivable as far west as Albuquerque, New Mexico. Listeners were advised during the nightly sign-off to tune to WHK for Mutual programming. WHKK was interconnected with WHK and WHKC, allowing all three stations to share locally-produced programming.

United continued to seek upgrades for both WHK and WHKK. On February 8, 1946, United filed with the FCC to swap frequencies for both stations, moving WHK to 640 kHz at 50,000 watts with a directional antenna and WHKK to 1420 kHz at 5,000 watts fulltime. The FCC dismissed the filings under grounds of violating existing clear-channel regulations.

=== Emphasizing country and popular music ===
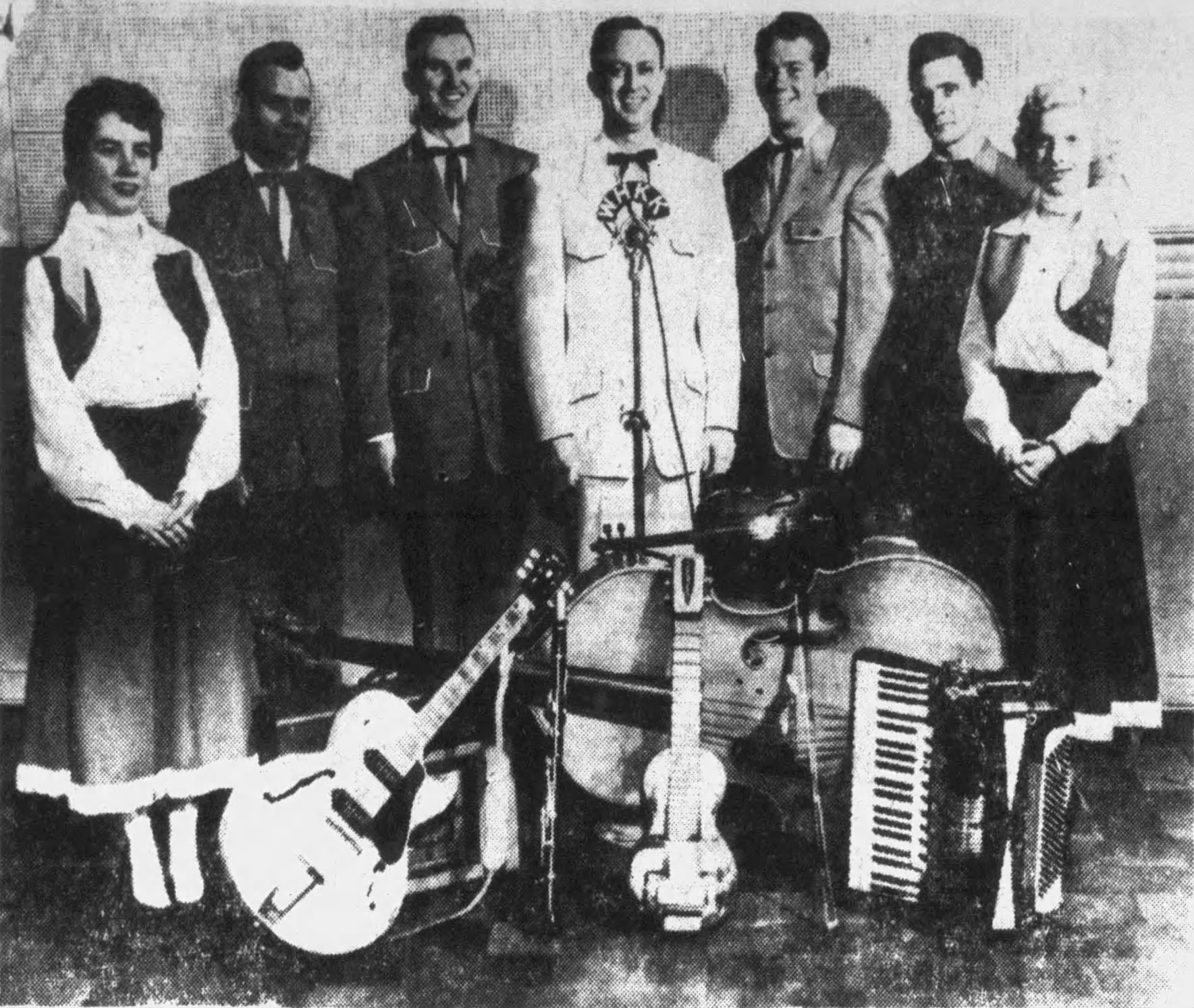
In-studio orchestra for WHKK's Melody Round-Up, c. 1955, host/announcer Cliff Rodgers at center.

Cliff Rodgers joined WHKK on December 25, 1945, following World War II and pre-war work at WTAX in Springfield, Illinois. Initially playing popular music, Rodgers began using his daily shows to emphasize country and western music, which he termed "hillbilly music". At the time, Rodgers was one of only a dozen personalities in American radio that played country music, and the only such host in Ohio radio. By 1947, Rodgers hosted three programs on WHKK: Morning Jamboree, Melody Round-Up and Western Serenade, all country-themed. Rodgers hosted a polio fundraiser for the March of Dimes in February 1949, and recorded two country songs, "Lonely Renfro Valley Rose" and "My Heart Went Straying to You". Eddy Wayne also joined the station in 1948, performing country songs daily on-air with the band, the Starlight Rangers.

United sold WHKK to two associates, Jackson B. Maurer and Philip R. Herbert, for $100,000 on August 26, 1952; Maurer was WHK's former general sales manager and Herbert had been involved with WHK, WCLE and WHKK since 1938. After the deal closed in October 1952, multiple staffers left, including Wayne; his dismissal came as Maurer and Herbert felt the station had an overabundance of "hillbilly" talent. Rodgers emceed a January 1, 1953, concert in Canton, Ohio, that was to have featured Hank Williams, who died in West Virginia while driving to the venue; Rodgers delivered the news of Williams' death to the audience and the concert continued with Wayne (by then with WCUE) and warmup act Hawkshaw Hawkins. By 1954, Rodgers was named as WHKK's program director and was recognized by Billboard and Country and Western Jamboree Magazine as one of the top radio hosts playing country music.

WHKK dropped all of Mutual's remaining entertainment and non-news programming—most notably Queen for a Day—on December 3, 1956, in favor of music and local newscasts on the half-hour; music now included two top 30 hits every 30 minutes. The change moved Rodgers to the morning Breakfast Time program, cut his Melody Round-Up by 30 minutes, and gave Pete Myers, who joined WHKK two months earlier, two shows in the late-morning and afternoons. Rodgers left the station in July 1957 to join a local advertising agency. Hosting the late-morning show as "lovable, laughable Pete Myers", Myers began using the afternoon program to develop a distinct, fast-talking persona largely influenced by Mad magazine, B movies and beatnik culture. Joining WJW and WJW-TV in January 1958, Myers dubbed this persona as "Mad Daddy".

Maurer sold his half-share in WHKK to Herbert by February 1957. By 1958, WHKK aired three programs reliant on call-in participation, Teletune Quiz, Sound Off and Answer Man. These shows proved so popular that, in April 1958, Ohio Bell threatened to disconnect eight of the station's twelve phone lines, claiming the volume of calls were overwhelming the system. WHKK obtained an injunction in Common Pleas Court preventing the disconnection, which Ohio Bell sued to remove. After Ohio Bell threatened again to disconnect the station, the dispute was settled one week later by mutual agreement from both parties.

=== "Hello Radio": Susquehanna ownership ===
Susquehanna Radio Corporation purchased WHKK from Herbert in September 1959 for $600,000, becoming the company's first station outside of Pennsylvania. Art Carlson, who was transferred to Akron as station manager with the sale, said the purchase came after Susquehanna sought out "run-down properties with the best possible facilities" in markets without a Top 40 format. After the transaction was completed, a programming mandate limiting religious programming to Sunday mornings was implemented in early January 1960. The change cancelled WHKK's daily broadcasts from the Akron Baptist Temple, prompting senior pastor Rev. Dallas Billington to protest the move and threaten a hearing before the FCC.

WHKK was renamed WHLO on January 18, 1960; the new call sign stood for "Hello Radio". The same day, believing that WHLO would launch with promotion and fanfare, WCUE had host Art Knight lock himself in their studio to redress grievances against management. Two days later, Knight reportedly went missing in what turned out to a publicity stunt. WHLO received minimal press coverage in the Beacon Journal, which ceased printing the station's daily lineups altogether after the name change. When asked in June 1961 why WHKK was renamed WHLO, Beacon columnist Dick Shippy replied, "the name was changed to protect the innocent". Shippy was frequently critical of WHLO, saying, "I only tune in WHLO when my watch stops", joked the nightly sign-offs were because "they need about 12 hours daily to clear away the rubble" and compared frequent on-air mentions of "WHLO" to "... Leon Wagner charging a fly ball and he yells repeatedly 'I got it, I got it, I got it'... and then he drops it".

WHLO dubbed their airstaff as "The Good Guys" (a phrase WHK also used for their disc jockeys) frequently appearing at public appearances and charity athletic events. "Uncle Joe" Cunningham debuted on April 1, 1960, in what was originally a temporary role, but quickly became one of the station's most popular hosts, emceeing multiple record hops and remote broadcasts. Steve Fullerton joined the station in 1962 as a disc jockey before moving to the news department, eventually becoming news director and a mentor to the staff. Fullerton later said, "the news room was like a detention hall for disc jockeys who were failures. But slowly we matured." WHLO moved to new studios on West Market Street in March 1966, owing to the station's growth; the prior O'Neil Building lease agreement had been renegotiated by Susquehanna to remove a profit revenue-sharing clause. The station recorded a promotional single in 1962 titled "The Akron-Canton Hometown Song" with lyrics centered around the region.

Here was a station that had the best of both worlds: two full drive times all year long, with our 6:00 a.m. sign-on and our 7:45 p.m. December/January and 11:00 p.m. June/July sign-offs. You can imagine what a tragic day it was when I had to deliver the bad news: “Tomorrow morning, don’t sign on at 6:00 a.m. Cut back to local sunrise.”

— Al Sanders, WHLO general manager

Prior to 1967, WHLO operated with a 6 a.m. daily sign-on regardless of local sunrise. In 1965, the FCC proposed pre-sunrise and post-sunset authorization rules allowing formally allowing Class-II and Class-III stations operating on Class-I clear channels this authority at lower power. One provision eliminated Class-II stations located east of an existing clear channel from signing on before local sunrise, later clarified to local sunrise with and without daylight saving time. This change impacted both WHLO and WHCU in Ithaca, New York, the latter operating on the same frequency as WWL in New Orleans. (Note: Other Class-II stations that operated at 640 kHz by 1974 included WNAD in Norman, Oklahoma, WOI in Ames, Iowa, and CBN in St. John's, Newfoundland and Labrador.) Both stations protested the rule change, with WHLO proposing operating only at 500 watts or less prior to Akron sunrise. Legal firm Cohn and Marks began representing WHLO and Susquehanna and was tasked with helping justify the station's 6 a.m. sign-on. The FCC affirmed the new rules in October 1967, forcing WHLO to have a variable sign-on as late as 7:45 a.m. in December and January. WHLO was granted an exception to the Akron sunrise restrictions from January 1974 to May 1975 when permanent daylight savings time was observed.

WHLO's existing tower site was on leased land in a floodplain; as the towers were constructed during a steel shortage at the end of World War II, one tower was propped up with a wooden base and at risk of termite infestation. Susquehanna owned a 26-acre (110,000 m^{2}) parcel of land in Copley Township on Minor Road, and received FCC approval to transmit from the location in October 1969, but construction of a replacement two-tower array required approval from the township's zoning commission. The commission rejected the proposal when 40 adjacent residents objected to the towers amid concerns with potential radio and television interference. One farmer, objecting to potential radiation from the towers, threatened a station engineer conducting measurements on the land with a shotgun. WHLO began tower construction anyway, prompting the township to issue a zoning violation stop-work order by mid-May 1970. Common Pleas judge Theodore Price ruled that radio stations were public utilities and thus exempt from local zoning regulations, enabling WHLO to resume tower construction.

Copley officials appealed the case before the Ninth District Court of Appeals, claiming Price held a lack of authority. During an informal meeting conducted by the township by September 1970, station officials said the residents and township had a lack of understanding over the towers. The FCC's construction permit was extended through 1971 and completed by December 1971; the former site was dismantled with dynamite.

In September 1970, Susquehanna acquired Canton station WNYN-FM for $212,000, at the time the highest price for an FM facility in the region. Susquehanna originally intended to operate WHLQ as an extended simulcast of WHLO, but eventually adopted an automated easy listening format "Good Life" similar to co-owned WLQR in Toledo. Unable to upgrade the station's limited signal due to protests from WINW, Susquehanna agreed by May 1976 to sell WHLQ to John Bayliss, general manager of a Cincinnati radio station. The sale was withdrawn after WINW filed an objection; by 1978, Susquehanna sold WHLQ to WINW's owners.

By 1971, WHLO moved to a "chicken rock" format of softer-sounding Top 40 hits, in part due to the station's limited hours and the emergence of FM stations. The January–February 1971 Hooper ratings showed WHLO with a 5.6 and 10.1 shares in mornings and afternoons, respectively, ranking behind WAKR's 47.3 and 31.5 shares in the same periods.

=== Evolution to news and talk ===
WHLO's transition to a news/talk format began in September 2, 1974, when a morning-drive all-news block launched hosted by Fullerton. A self-described "newsman-personality", Fullerton continued providing twice-daily news commentaries. Due to the station's sign-on at Akron sunrise, the morning news show had 14 different start times throughout the year. An hour-long 5 p.m. news block followed in August 1975. By December 1975, WHLO devoted 22 percent of its approximately 16.5-hour broadcast day to newscasts. Jerry Healey, formerly of WAKR, became a contributor to the morning news block in early 1975. Steve "Boom Boom" Cannon hosted an early-afternoon show from September 1975 to August 1978 with an emphasis on trivia and celebrity interviews. Future voiceover artist Greg Berg worked at WHLO from 1976 to 1978 as Cannon's show producer. Lee Hamilton, previously the radio voice of the Cleveland Crusaders and a former fill-in host for Pete Franklin at WWWE, joined WHLO in October 1976 for an evening sports talk show. Hamilton had a contentious relationship with management; by July 1979, the station placed a classified ad in the Beacon Journal searching for a replacement host, while Hamilton solicited on-air for a new job.

The station continued to struggle in the ratings despite the shift. While the ratings for Cannon's show improved between the Fall 1975 and Spring 1976 Arbitron books, it and WHLO overall continued to place behind WAKR, WAEZ, WCUE and WSLR. WHLO's shift to talk radio was complete by April 1977, when Nick Anthony joined the station as late-morning host and program director. Cunningham left in September 1977, declining to become either a talk host or newscaster. The station carried four Akron Zips football away games in 1977, intending to capitalize on the team's improved performance and WAKR de-emphasizing the team, but WAKR agreed to carry all Zips games after WHLO announced their coverage plans.

WHLO affiliated with NBC Radio by November 1978, then switched to CBS Radio one year later. The station utilized Susquehanna's existing news bureau in Washington, D.C., with hopes of a Columbus bureau for statewide coverage. WHLO was the only talk station in the Susquehanna chain, resulting in ownership scrutiny over controversial subject matter during programs. The station's ratings improved in the latter part of 1979, with all hosts, and Hamilton in particular, experiencing ratings growth in core demographics.

=== Switch to 24-hour broadcasting, all-news attempt and nostalgia flip ===
I'm looking forward to having our first morning newscast start at the same time every day. The way it's been, the news has 14 different starting times during the year. So when someone who has been listening to our news at 6 a.m. in the summer, suddenly finds we're not on at that time in the winter, he turns to WAKR or some other station. It might take us a year to get that listener back.

— Nick Anthony, WHLO program director, 1980

Change in FCC policy, in particular a relaxing of rules in June 1980 limiting clear-channel stations like KFI to a 750-mile (1,210 km) protected range, allowed WHLO to attain nighttime service. Station management saw the move and full-time operations as key to overtaking WAKR's status as a news leader, along with adding play-by-play sports coverage at night which was previously unavailable. WHLO was granted interim authority for 24-hour broadcasts on October 1, 1980, and began broadcasting until 1 a.m. nightly with 500 watts night power two days later.

On November 5, the station adopted all-news from 6 a.m. to 6 p.m. daily branded "The Daily News", with talk programming in the nighttime hours; Fullerton was re-assigned to co-host the morning news block, Anthony was moved to evenings, and the station claimed Mutual's The Larry King Show from WAKR. Mutual had already been in an aggressive push to install satellite dishes at their affiliates to receive the network on the Westar satellite instead of traditional landlines. Newscaster Bill Jasso, promoted to news director in July, oversaw an expansion in news personnel from 10 to 14 staffers. As December 1980 ended, Bernie Thompson was installed as station manager replacing Robert Winer, who held the position since July 1978. Winer sought to model WHLO's all-news programming after KYW in Philadelphia and WBBM in Chicago.

WHLO inaugurated 24-hour broadcasting on January 5, 1981, with Larry King's addition; a new transmitter was also installed at the Minor Road site capable of transmitting at 10,000 watts. Akron City Council passed a non-binding resolution commending the station's new 24-hour service, but afterwards was criticized by one councilman for the trivial resolution being offered up anonymously. One month into the format, Fullerton and Anthony both left the station to join WSLR; Anthony's evening show was replaced with Enterprise Radio programming.

On May 1, 1981, WHLO flipped to a hybrid easy listening/adult standards format dubbed "Memories Music", retaining five news staffers. Thompson prevented Hamilton from hosting a final show after learning Hamilton was aware of his show's cancellation. Hamilton joined KTAR in Phoenix, Arizona, by the end of the month. Thompson attributed the failure of all-news to WHLO's strong signal making it impossible to cover events in adjacent cities that listeners in other cities were not interested in. Senior vice president Art Carlson said management was aware almost immediately the format was an expensive mistake. Thompson left as general manager in June to move back to Portland, telling the Beacon Journal his previous house had not been sold yet and "with the current condition of WHLO and the time it will take to bring it around, I felt it just was not worth the effort on my part". One week later, Jasso and his wife were fired over an "attitudinal problem" due to his disappointment with the format switch. Larry King's show was dropped in August after Mutual threatened to cancel it due to WHLO giving CBS priority over their network.

WHLO's switch came following WCUE's similar move to big band-focused standards in March; coincidentally, WCUE was sold to a group led by Winer. A Susquehanna executive later said WHLO flipped following three months of research showing little on commercial radio that catered to people over 40. WHLO intended to carry the Music of Your Life service but WCUE claimed the affiliation first, forcing WHLO to develop their format in-house. Despite the changes, WHLO was named an affiliate for the Cleveland Cavaliers Radio Network for the 1981–82 season, and continued to carry Pittsburgh Steelers games, Notre Dame Fighting Irish football from Mutual, and Major League Baseball on CBS Radio.

The failure of the all-news format and staff instability were profiled by the Beacon Journal in July 1981. Thompson told the paper, "I wish to hell I'd never come to Akron" and saw all-news as "a grievous error". The format switches also ended the practice of personal endorsements of companies, primarily small business, by on-air hosts which netted considerable revenue. Juli Dorff, a former Sears department manager who took over as general manager, dismissed rumors of Susquehanna selling WHLO due to ratings and revenue losses. Dorff later called all-news and talk "extremely expensive" with needed manpower and equipment, and felt the format could have worked at WHLO had ownership provided more support. WHLO attaining night service ultimately proved a hinderance as increased competition from FM stations and Cleveland-market signals made it difficult to find a viable format; Art Carlson later said, "strangely, this was the final nail in the coffin, the thing we had hoped and prayed for".

=== Christian radio years ===
Following continued low ratings, by August 1984, Susquehanna sold WHLO to Trans World Broadcasting, headed by Xenophon and Lee Zapis and owners of WZAK in Cleveland. Neither Xenophon or Lee Zapis considered retaining the standards format owing to the format's older demographics not conducive to advertisers. While waiting for the sale to close, Xenophon suggested flipping WHLO to Christian radio, which Lee disagreed with concerned the station would air preaching programs around the clock like WABQ in Cleveland.

A research study commissioned by Trans World showed both middle of the road (MOR) and contemporary Christian music (CCM) as format "holes" in the Akron market, and after WCUE flipped from standards to MOR in early November 1984, Trans World announced WHLO would switch to CCM at 6 a.m. on December 25. Kent State football and basketball remained on the lineup, along with the hourly CBS newscasts. Prior to the sale, WHLO was granted a construction permit to increase daytime power to 5,000 watts. The power increase took effect in August 1985, allowing the station to be audible in 66 counties throughout Ohio and western Pennsylvania. WHLO struggled in the Akron market ratings under the new format and failed to list in the Fall 1985 Arbitron book. Lee Zapis began spending more attention in Atlanta after Trans World purchased a station there and implemented an urban contemporary format similar to WZAK to initial ratings success.

Trans World sold WHLO to Mortenson Broadcasting in early August 1986 for $1.2 million; Lee Zapis told the Beacon Journal the sale came after the format "wasn't working out as well as we hoped it would, and we got a good offer". Mortenson already owned WTOF-FM and WTOF in Canton and WSUM in Parma, Ohio, and divested the latter two stations to satisfy existing FCC regulations. WTOF-FM co-founder Jack Mortenson regarded WHLO's signal strength as a 75 percent increase in coverage over WTOF and WSUM combined. After the deal closed, WHLO moved their studios to the Clock Tower Place near Summit Mall and began broadcasting in AM stereo. The station's playlist was altered to Christian adult contemporary along with adding daily Christian talk and teaching programs in late mornings, most of which accounted for the station's revenue at the end of 1987, although Mortenson sought to hire additional sales staff.

David Pierce, later an executive for Educational Media Foundation, was WHLO's program director in 1987 and sought to improve their production and marketing efforts. The station unveiled a mobile broadcasting unit boasting a 3,000-watt boombox and by 1989, a "Love Bear" mascot. WJW-TV meteorologist André Bernier began providing weather forecasts. In November 1989, Mark Price of the Cleveland Cavaliers, a devout Christian, became host of a weekly two-hour music and interview show. Former Indians player Andre Thornton started hosting a daily interview program. Area Christian preacher and activist Ray Jeske hosted a nightly talk show with an emphasis on sports Monday nights. The station's playlist also included select Christian rap songs in the evening in an attempt to court younger listeners.

Mortenson sold both WHLO and WTOF to Salem Communications in October 1996 for $8 million. The deal represented part of a major expansion for Salem, who purchased WHK in April and flipped it to Christian talk and preaching; Salem also acquired WCCD (the former WSUM) in April 1997 via a group deal. When the deal closed in June 1997, WHLO switched to "The Word in Praise", a satellite format programmed by Salem; WTOF concurrently flipped to a simulcast of WHK under the WHK-FM call sign. The station carried Akron Aeros games during the team's inaugural 1997 season. Eddy Wayne, by then a retired trucker and minister, returned to WHLO for a weekly gospel music program. Don Ursetti joined WHLO in 1997 for high school sports coverage after his former station WAKR de-emphasized it; Ursetti remained at WHLO through 2020. By 2001, WHLO featured a mixture of Christian talk and southern gospel.

=== Clear Channel/iHeartMedia ownership ===
In the fall of 2001, WHLO was sold to Clear Channel Communications for $4.5 million. This followed a complex seven-station asset swap earlier in the year between Salem, Clear Channel, and WCLV owner Radio Seaway where Clear Channel purchased WHK-FM from Salem and used that license as a new home for WKDD and its hot adult contemporary format. The last ratings book under Salem ownership had WHLO ranked at 26th place among 30 stations surveyed, with a 0.4 share. WHLO began simulcasting WKDD after the deal closed until June 10, 2002, when it relaunched as a talk station featuring syndicated programming, with an emphasis on conservative talk. Veteran personality Bill Hall hosted the morning show until January 2004, when WHLO picked up The War Room with Quinn and Rose, regionally syndicated from Pittsburgh.

WKDD morning personality Matt Patrick began hosting a daily late-afternoon talk show on WHLO in late April 2008, which was moved to late mornings by November 2008. Patrick's WHLO show was used as an early platform for the Tea Party movement. Patrick left both stations in late December 2009; the following month, WHLO debuted a local morning show hosted by Jim Albright. WHLO has also aired short-lived local programs hosted by Bob Earley and Stan Piatt, both formerly with WNIR.

== Programming ==
WHLO features an entirely syndicated lineup, including Michael DelGiorno, Brian Kilmeade, The Clay Travis and Buck Sexton Show, The Sean Hannity Show, The Jesse Kelly Show and Coast to Coast AM. Since 2020, WHLO has been the radio flagship for University of Akron Zips football and basketball. WHLO also carries play-by-play of the Akron RubberDucks, an affiliate for the Cleveland Guardians.

WHLO is an affiliate of the Cavaliers AudioVerse since the 2026–27 season, carrying select games alongside full-time affiliate WRQK-FM.
