= WABQ =

Radio station in Parma, Ohio

- Parma, Ohio; United States
- Broadcast area: Greater Cleveland
- Frequency: 1000 kHz
- Branding: Cleveland's Gospel Giant

Programming
- Format: Urban contemporary gospel

Ownership
- Owner: DE Media, LLC.
- Sister stations: WCCD

History
- First air date: May 31, 1973
- Former call signs: WSUM (1973–1987); WCCD (1987–2001, 2001–2025); WHK (2001)
- Call sign meaning: Previously used on 1540 AM in Cleveland

Technical information
- Licensing authority: FCC
- Facility ID: 25522
- Class: D
- Power: 500 watts day; 200 watts day (CP)
- Transmitter coordinates: 41°19′11.19″N 81°46′6.47″W; 41°21′30.19″N 81°40′2.46″W (CP)
- Translator: 105.3 W287DQ (Cleveland)
- Repeater: 1460 WCCD (Painesville)

Links
- Public license information: Public file; LMS
- Webcast: Listen live
- Website: wabqcleveland.com

WABQ (1000 AM, "Cleveland's Gospel Giant") is a daytime-only radio station licensed to Parma, Ohio, United States, serving much of Greater Cleveland. Owned by DE Media, LLC, WABQ airs an urban contemporary gospel format with a transmitter located in North Royalton. In addition to a standard analog transmission, WABQ is relayed over low-power Cleveland translator W287DQ (105.3 FM), simulcast on Painesville–licensed WCCD (1460 AM), and is available online.

This station was founded in 1973 as WSUM, which initially carried a secular format of music and talk focused exclusively on Parma, with an airstaff including many familiar radio and television personalities. By 1975, the station pivoted to serving Cleveland's suburban areas, then switched to talk radio with local hosts. WSUM's ownership was financially overextended and burdened with the struggling Cleveland Crusaders hockey team, prompting a sale to Mortenson Broadcasting in 1976 and switch to religious programming. Renamed WCCD in 1987 after being sold to American Sunrise, then to Guardian Communications, it was purchased by Salem Communications in 1996. Under Salem, WCCD continued to carry religious fare but switched to conservative talk in 2003, which migrated to WHK (1420 AM) in July 2004 after Salem reacquired that station. Salem divested WCCD to the New Spirit Revival Center Ministries, Inc. and lead pastor Darrell C. Scott. WCCD was briefly taken silent in 2022, then was sold off to WABQ owner Dale Edwards; the two stations swapped callsigns in 2025.

== History ==
=== Application and construction ===
The Northeast Communications Corp. filed for paperwork with the Federal Communications Commission (FCC) on August 6, 1969, to construct a radio station in Parma, Ohio, at 1000 AM. Such a station would be the first new AM station to sign on in Greater Cleveland since WDOK in 1950. A competing application for a station in Warren, Ohio, was filed prior to Northeast; as neither town had a station licensed to them, this necessitated the FCC to decide between granting a station to either Parma or Warren. The FCC designated both applications for hearing on January 6, 1971, and granted Northeast a permit by September 1, 1971. The permit was assigned the WSUM call sign on January 24, 1972.

Construction began on a combined studio/transmitter facility in North Royalton by October 1972. Unlike other AM stations in the area, WSUM's newscasts and programming were from the start focused directly on Parma. Station manager J. Albert Callahan previously worked at WKYC radio in both advertising and promotion, and said of the Parma focus, "... we have to offer a broad range of entertainment and information. Besides, why do what everybody else is doing? ... it isn’t the wattage that makes a radio station mean something, it’s what you put on it that counts".

=== Focus on Parma and switch to talk ===
WSUM took to the air on May 31, 1973, with an on-air staff consisting largely of veterans. Jim Doney, host of WJW-TV's Adventure Road, was hired as morning host and became general manager by October 1974. It was Doney's first radio job in over 22 years. Linn Sheldon, better known as "Barnaby" on WUAB, hosted a daily program titled Kaleidoscope. In addition to hourly UPI Audio bulletins and newscasts directly oriented towards Parma, WEWS-TV sportscaster Gib Shanley provided daily sports updates; Shanley left after one year. Another veteran announcer, Ronnie Barrett, joined WSUM by August for afternoon drive; in describing the station's different environment, Barrett said, "I worked at so many where you had to have an appointment to see the general manager... At WSUM, you have to have an appointment not to see him." By August 1974, Barrett replaced Doney for the early morning show, but Doney continued hosting the daily tradio program. Doney left WSUM by June 1975 after WJW-TV moved Adventure Road to mornings and ultimately cancelled it. Barrett left the following month to become evening host at WDOK-FM.

The station began playing reruns, then new installments, of Mutual's The Zero Hour in afternoon drive in January 1974. After Zero Hour ended production, reruns of various "Golden Age of Radio"-era programs including The Life of Riley, Dragnet, The Green Hornet and Gunsmoke aired in afternoons. WSUM was one of a few stations in the United States to air such scripted programming in afternoon drive. Sports coverage included softball games in Parma called on-site along with horse racing from Thistledown; WSUM additionally carried Notre Dame Fighting Irish football, with all night games aired the next day on tape. A Saturday morning program was hosted by high school students within the Parma City School District.

WSUM was granted one-hour pre-sunrise authorization in January 1974 when Ohio took part in year-round daylight saving time, enabling them to sign-on at 8 a.m. instead of 9 a.m., which would have prevented it from broadcasting in morning drive. The FCC considered granting such authorization to daytime-only stations across-the-board.

WSUM dropped their heavy orientation towards Parma by June 1975 in favor of serving Parma and adjacent suburbs. Cleveland Press radio critic Bill Barrett joked, "WSUM Radio, the white socks no longer all that stylish and the perogi [sic] grown soggy, is backing away from its Parma image... the pink flamingo thing worked for Ghoulardi, but not for anyone else." The station's format also changed to beautiful music but November 1975 announced another switch to talk radio led by former WERE host Merle Pollis, who joined WSUM as morning host, program director and assistant station manager; this followed WERE's flip from a controversial talk format to all-news earlier in the year. One of the hosts, Hal Centini, had notoriety as "The Vicious Piranha", a frequent caller to other talk shows. The tradio program was retained and the high school program was expanded to include students from other area districts.

=== Ownership insolvency and sale to Mortenson ===
Jay Moore, principal owner of the Cleveland Crusaders of the World Hockey Association (WHA), assumed 30.59 percent majority control of WSUM on December 17, 1975, after purchasing 1,912 shares of company stock for $138,420; Moore claimed to invest all proceeds into the station. Moore purchased control of the Crusaders in mid-1975, and also owned a motel in Aurora and a country club in Uniontown. These various interests overextended Moore financially. Payroll for WSUM staff was delayed by four days in early May 1976; staff was then advised to withhold cashing their paychecks for several days after being issued. WSUM also lost their UPI access due to nonpayment, the motel and country club had large amounts of delinquent taxes, and the Crusaders struggled to meet payroll, while Cleveland Trust took out a second mortgage against Moore's Shaker Heights house. Moore paid off the hockey club's outstanding taxes by taking out a personal loan and publicly floated the idea of relocating the club, particularly if a National Hockey League (NHL) team were to come to Cleveland.

Pollis resigned from his managerial duties at WSUM in late May amid an offer to buy the station. Moore instead offered to sell WSUM to the Christian Broadcast Association (CBA), owner of WTOF in Canton, Ohio, on July 16, 1976, for $400,000. Pollis left the station several days later, claiming he had been fired. Filings made to the FCC showed WSUM would switch to Christian radio with the sale, becoming the first such station in Greater Cleveland, carrying a mix of country music, folk, gospel and taped religious programs. During the sale process, WSUM went silent on August 8, 1976, owing to Moore's financial distress, dismissing all sixteen part- and full-time employees. The shutdown rendered Cleveland without a talk radio station. WDMT flipped to a combination of religion and gospel during this interregnum but was reversed after 39 hours; CBA president John M. Mortenson said the failure of WDMT's switch would not have any effect on plans for WSUM. Mortenson also said WSUM would be "middle of the road (in format), with an emphasis on religion".

The temporary silencing expedited FCC approval of the sale to September 7 instead of the typical six-month period, enabling WSUM to resume broadcasting on September 27. Bob Wells, popularly known as horror host "Hoolihan" at WJW-TV and a born again Christian, became WSUM's general manager, helping guide the station from an "edgy" financial position into profitability in less than one year. Wells remained at WSUM until 1979, when he moved to Florida to help construct WCLF in Clearwater. CBA was renamed Mortenson Broadcasting in 1979.

While many daytime-only stations received additional pre-sunrise and post-sunset authorization in 1983, WSUM's extension was only for 30 minutes after sunset due to their status protecting clear-channel station WCFL in Chicago.

=== American Sunrise, Guardian and Salem ownership ===
Mortenson put WSUM up for sale in August 1986 after purchasing Akron station WHLO. Jack Mortenson purchased WHLO because it had a stronger signal than WSUM, and common ownership of more than one AM station with overlapping signals was prohibited at the time; Mortenson also divested WTOF (900 AM) in Canton. When the sale to Jack Boyd's American Sunrise Communications was completed on January 1, 1987, WSUM was renamed WCCD on February 1. The religious format was retained, but WCCD added Christian contemporary music in late afternoons prior to sign-off. American Sunrise sold WCCD, along with four other stations, to Guardian Communications for $5.6 million in 1990.

Under Guardian ownership, WCCD marketed itself as a "family-friendly" Christian station that de-emphasized preaching of the "fire and brimstone" archetype, but still featured conservative personalities including Phyllis Schlafly and Dr. James Dobson. Management claimed to experience an increase in listenership after WWWE adjusted their format to feature more confrontational talk hosts. Despite the marketing, WCCD's most popular program was the reactionary populism-themed What's Right, What's Left, hosted by the Rev. Ernie Sanders, a Berea pastor who became a visible leader in anti-abortion movements and was described as "even more to the right than Rush Limbaugh". From its launch in 1988, Sanders's show was brokered programming on WCCD; neither he or the station disclosed the amount paid for the airtime.

Guardian put up the nine-station chain for auction in September 1996 after Carl Linder (who through Great American Insurance held a 50 percent ownership stake in the company and recently divested its stake in Citicasters) announced his intention to sell his stake in Guardian, inducing the company's other co-owners to follow along. The stations were originally intended to be sold separately at auction, with a $700,000 minimum offer price for WCCD. Salem Communications purchased it, along with Guardian's Baltimore and Cincinnati stations, for $3 million, and retained the religion format as a complement to WHK (1420 AM), which Salem purchased the previous year. During a transition period when Salem divested WHK as part of a complex seven-station asset swap, WHK's three-letter callsign was temporarily "parked" on WCCD beginning on February 26, 2001, and lasting through August 3, 2001, when the WHK calls moved to 1220 AM.

Salem changed WCCD's format by late January 2003, dropping all of the religious and brokered programming in favor of conservative talk as The Voice, programmed largely with syndicated hosts from the Salem Radio Network and financial updates from Bloomberg Radio; management cited an available niche audience in the market for "intelligent talk" programming. This format moved to 1420 AM on July 14, 2004, after Salem re-purchased that station, then identifying as WRMR, and relaunched it under the WHK calls. Prior to the repurchase of 1420 AM, market speculation had WCCD's format being moved to co-owned WKNR, displacing that station's sports format.

=== New Spirit Revival and DE Media ownership ===
After the talk format's relocation to WHK, Salem shifted WCCD to carrying programming from the Word In Praise network. The station was sold to New Spirit Revival Center Ministries on April 20, 2005, headed by area pastor Darrell C. Scott and wife Belinda Scott, for $2.1 million. After the sale, WCCD's studios were relocated to New Spirit's campus in Cleveland Heights in a building originally built as a synagogue, while both husband and wife were featured on the station; a 2005 Plain Dealer article on New Spirit erroneously referred to WCCD as "a 5,000-watt radio station". Darrell Scott gained visibility as a campaign surrogate for Donald Trump in both the 2016 and 2020 presidential election; Scott befriended Trump in 2011, cofounded the National Diversity Coalition for Trump, and was a keynote speaker at the 2016 Republican National Convention in Cleveland.

WCCD filed for an STA request for a power reduction with the FCC on June 16, 2022, after their transmitter site in North Royalton was slated to be redeveloped by the land owner. WCCD was then taken silent on September 22, 2022, with an application to move to WHK's transmitter site in Seven Hills. New Spirit agreed to sell WCCD to DE Media, LLC—owner of WABQ in Painesville and WKTX in Cortland—for $600,000 in January 2023, with $500,000 paid in monthly installments over the next 30 years. Edwards included plans to operate WCCD as a non-commercial station. The deal closed by June of that year.

On July 15, 2025, WCCD's call sign was exchanged with WABQ. The station relaunched in October 2025 alongside a content partnership with the Call and Post and was a return of the WABQ identity to Cleveland since the original WABQ at 1540 AM was sold in 2006. DE Media president Dale Edwards said, "this is more than a rebrand... this is a resurrection, a rise from the ashes with purpose, power, and praise".

== FM translator ==
WABQ is additionally relayed over the following low-power FM translator:

Broadcast translator for WABQ
Call sign	Frequency	City of license	FID	ERP (W)	HAAT	Class	Transmitter coordinates	FCC info
W287DQ	105.3 FM	Cleveland, Ohio	157726	230	11 m (36 ft)	D	41°26′46.7″N 81°37′22.5″W	LMS
