= Rabia Kazan =

Turkish journalist

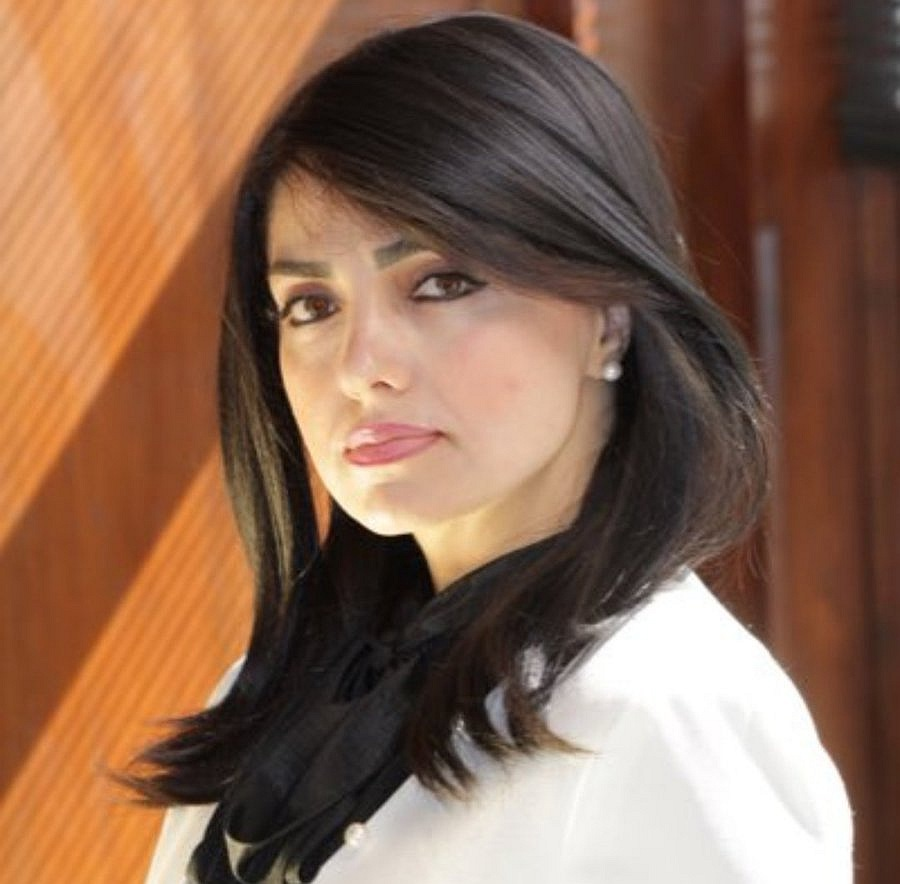
- Born: 25 June 1976 (age 50); Malatya, Turkey
- Occupations: President of Middle Eastern Women’s Coalition, Best-Selling Author, Activist against child marriages
- Years active: 1996–present
- Website: middleeasternwomenscoalition.com

Rabia Kazan (born 25 June 1976) is a Turkish author and women's rights activist. She is the president of the Middle Eastern Women's Coalition (MEWC) and was formerly on the board of directors of the National Diversity Coalition for Trump (NDC TRUMP). Kazan is a former Muslim and a critic of Islam, known for her bestselling book The Angels of Tehran about the legal prostitution system in Iran.

== Career ==
Kazan started her journalism career in 1996 as a correspondent working for the Istanbul Documentary show on Flash TV, a Turkish television channel. She then became a columnist for the Nationalist Movement Party (MHP) affiliated with the Turkish newspaper Ortadoğu, where she worked for six years and conducted an interview with Mehmet Ali Ağca that rose her to fame. She also founded the news magazine Haber Revizyon in Istanbul.

In 2007, Kazan went to Iran undercover, where she interviewed around 200 women and witnessed child marriages, human trafficking, and wedleases. Upon her return to Turkey, Kazan published her book Tahran Melekleri (The Angels of Tehran), which was about Nikah mut'ah, a temporary Muslim marriage. Her book became a bestseller in Turkey. After her work and publication of her books, she received multiple death threats.

She visited many Middle Eastern countries in dedication to her work to save women across the Middle Eastern from Sharia law by recording information taken from the women she met and work with.

She promoted Secularism in Islam to prevent of child marriages and the human trafficking of women on various media platforms in Italy.

Kazan moved to the United States in 2010 and worked for World Federation of United Nations Associations at the United Nations for two years.

She has worked for the International Civil Liberties Alliance (ICLA).

Kazan launched a global campaign in 2014 named This Is Not My Allah against Islamic terrorism with French political analyst Alain Wagner in New York City. The stated aim of the campaign is to encourage Muslims to speak out against Islamic extremism.

== Political involvement ==
In 2015, Kazan endorsed Donald Trump because of his statements about radical Islam. In 2016, she joined the National Diversity Coalition for Trump (NDC TRUMP) as an executive. In 2016, Kazan gave an interview to CNN News in which she approved of Trump's approach to Islamic extremism and encouraged moderate Muslims to stand up against radical Islam. In 2018 she became a president of the Middle Eastern Women's Coalition, a pro-Trump group Kazan formed. Kazan also donated to Trump's campaign, which, as a foreign national, was illegal for her to do.

Kazan later denounced many of her pro-Trump colleagues, believing they used her as a token minority to make Trump's comments on Islam less incendiary. She said that she herself had been "brainwashed". Commenting on the overlap between political lobbying and Donald Trump's business interests at the Trump International Hotel in Washington, DC—formerly the Old Post Office building on Pennsylvania Avenue—Kazan described Trump as being "like a cult leader, and people go to the hotel to show their loyalty and love for him."

She expressed disillusionment with Trump, stating that she believed he would support causes like fighting radical Islam and ISIS but ultimately felt betrayed by her experiences with his orbit of operatives.

== Personal life ==
In 2008, Kazan became engaged to Giacinto Licursi, an Italian lawyer and politician in order to conduct an interview in prison and briefly moved to Italy to remove her headscarf. She divorced Licursi in 2017. According to the Washington Post, Kazan for a short time flirted with lobbyist and retired US Marine Robert F. Hyde, who was previously implicated in the Trump-Ukraine scandal.

She made a decision to remove her hijab in 2012, which she had been forced to wear from age seven.

In October 2022, Kazan married Clayton Saunders, an investor who owns Saunders & Associates, at the Turkish Embassy in Washington, DC.

Kazan has converted to Christianity.

== See also ==
- List of Donald Trump presidential campaign endorsements, 2016
- List of women's rights activists
