= WCER =

WCER may refer to:

- WCER (FM), a radio station (97.5 FM) licensed to serve Delhi, New York, United States
- WCER (AM), a defunct radio station (900 AM) formerly licensed to serve Canton, Ohio, United States
- World Congress of Ethnic Religions
- Wisconsin Center for Education Research
