= WCUE =

Radio station in Cuyahoga Falls, Ohio

Currently silent
- Cuyahoga Falls, Ohio; United States
- Broadcast area: Akron, Ohio
- Frequency: 1150 kHz

Ownership
- Owner: Family Radio; (Loam Media, Inc.)

History
- First air date: 1949
- Call sign meaning: "Musical cue"

Technical information
- Licensing authority: FCC
- Facility ID: 20674
- Class: B
- Power: 5,000 watts (day); 500 watts (night)
- Transmitter coordinates: 41°12′5.2″N 81°31′24.4″W

Links
- Public license information: Public file; LMS

WCUE (1150 AM) is a radio station licensed to Cuyahoga Falls, Ohio, United States, that is currently silent. Owned by Loam Media, Inc., the station most recently carried a Christian format as a repeater for the non-commercial Family Radio network, serving the Akron metro area. WCUE's transmitter is located in Cuyahoga Falls.

== History ==
1950s station logo

WCUE began in 1949 as a daytime-only station licensed to Akron, Ohio; the station callsign referred to a musical cue. In 1963, the station's city of license was assigned to Cuyahoga Falls. From 1969 and into the 1970s, WCUE aired a Top 40 format. In 1981, WCUE Radio, Inc. sold WCUE to Sackett Broadcasting Company; Sackett then installed the Music of Your Life format aimed at older adults. By 1984, WCUE was airing middle of the road music; Jerry Healey was among the on-air personalities heard during these later years.

On October 22, 1986, Sackett Broadcasting donated WCUE to Family Radio of Oakland, California. The daytime power was increased from 1,000 to 2,500 watts in 1988 and then to 5,000 watts in 1990. In 2000, the license transitioned from commercial to non-commercial status. In 2002, Family Radio obtained a main station waiver, allowing WCUE to function solely as a repeater for the Family Radio network.

The station was taken dark on May 8, 2026, after Family Radio sold off the land where the transmitter is sited, which is adjacent to the Cuyahoga Valley National Park. That October, WCUE was sold to Dale Edwards' Radio Advantage One, owner of WABQ in Parma and WCCD in Painesville, for $5,000; a condition of the sale is that Family Radio would continue to program four hours of the station's airtime between 6 a.m. and 6 p.m. for ten years.
