= WILB =

WILB may refer to:

- WILB (AM), a radio station (1060 AM) licensed to serve Canton, Ohio, United States
- WILB-FM, a radio station (89.5 FM) licensed to serve Boardman, Ohio; see List of radio stations in Ohio
