= Darrell C. Scott =

American pastor, radio station owner/host and former advisor to Donald Trump

Pastor Darrell C. Scott
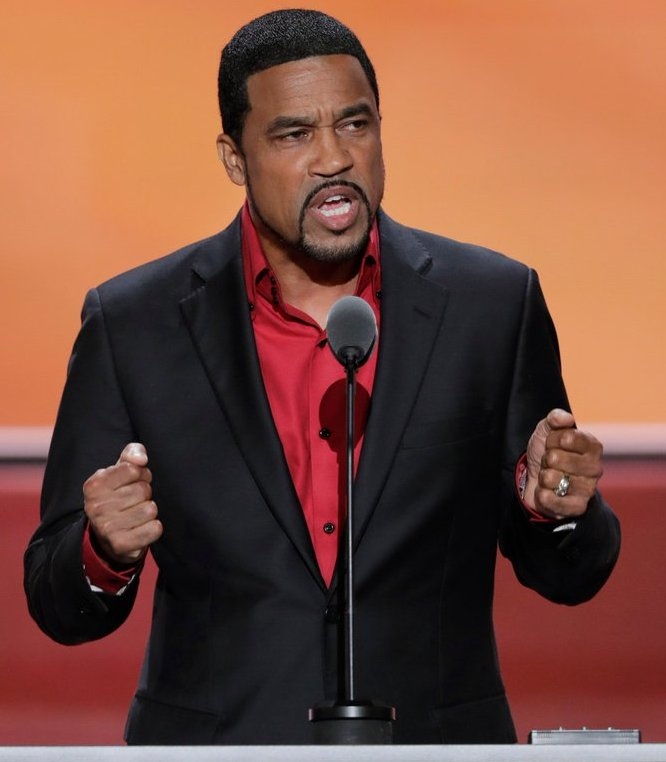
- 2016 Republican National Convention
- Occupations: Pastor; Radio station owner/host
- Employer(s): New Spirit Revival Center, Cleveland Heights, Ohio
- Political party: Republican
- Spouse: Belinda Scott

Darrell C. Scott is an American pastor, radio station owner/host, and a former advisor to Donald Trump. Scott is a co-founder of the New Spirit Revival Center in Cleveland Heights, Ohio. He co-founded, along with Michael D. Cohen, the National Diversity Coalition for Trump.

== Early life ==
Scott became a born again Christian in his 20s after a neighbor urged Scott and his wife to attend church.

In 2004, St. Thomas Christian College in Jacksonville, Florida, an unaccredited religious institution, awarded Scott an 'honorary doctorate'.

== Career ==
Scott is the founder and pastor of the New Spirit Revival Center in Cleveland Heights, Ohio, which owns radio station WCCD AM 1000 in Parma, Ohio, where Scott has a daily program.

=== Role in the 2016 presidential election ===
In 2011, Donald Trump met Scott in Trump Tower while considering a run for president. After Trump announced his candidacy, Scott was one of the first African-American pastors to support Trump and a key figure in leading other African-American pastors to attend meetings at Trump Tower. In April 2016, Scott and Donald Trump's personal attorney and campaign spokesperson Michael D. Cohen co-founded the National Diversity Coalition for Trump. The group's advisory board had leaders from American-Muslims for Trump, African-American Pastors for Trump, and Korean-Americans for Trump. Scott introduced Trump at a rally at the I-X Center before the 2016 Ohio Republican presidential primary and later hosted Trump at his church, with the event aired on Hannity. In July 2016, on the third day of the 2016 Republican National Convention, Scott was a keynote speaker in support of Donald Trump's nomination; Scott argued in his speech that the "Democrat Party has failed us".

=== Post-2016 election ===
After the 2016 United States presidential election, Scott gave an interview to National Public Radio and described the Democratic Party as "pimps" who "pimped out the inner city" like a "pimp stands next to a prostitute".

On November 30, 2016, Trump selected Scott as part of his presidential transition team. Scott publicly thanked Trump on Twitter, which resulted in a backlash on social media. Scott was called an Uncle Tom and was accused of taking money in exchange for his support of Trump.

In January 2017, CNN's Marc Lamont Hill characterized Scott and other members of Trump's diversity team as "mediocre Negroes" during a Don Lemon CNN Tonight segment.

On February 1, 2017, Trump responded with enthusiasm during a White House Black History Month event to Scott's suggestion that Chicago gang leaders wanted to meet to help reduce gun violence.

On April 18, 2017, Scott hosted a meeting at The St. Regis Washington, D.C. with six Chicago residents that hoped to start a community service called "Stronger Together" to rehabilitate housing and start new technical high schools teaching skills such as producing rap music.

On August 1, 2018, Scott said during a White House gathering of faith leaders that he thought Trump would be "the most pro-Black president" in his lifetime.

=== Post-2020 election ===
During the 2020 United States presidential election, Scott falsely claimed that votes were stopped from being counted. Five days after the 2020 election, Scott stated that fraud caused Trump's loss but also cited Trump's "unforced errors," including how Trump talked about the COVID-19 pandemic, saying, "I can't be upset if we shoot ourselves in the foot."

In January and February 2024, Scott referred to conservative political commentator Charlie Kirk as a "racist" and a "white supremacist," criticizing his views on Martin Luther King Jr. and the Civil Rights Act of 1964.

=== Television appearances ===
Scott has appeared as a commentator on networks Fox News, MSNBC, and CNN.

== Personal life ==
Scott is married to Belinda Scott.
