= WILB (AM) =

Catholic radio station in Canton, Ohio

Coordinates: 40°50′03″N 81°25′48″W

Living Bread Radio Network Flagship Station
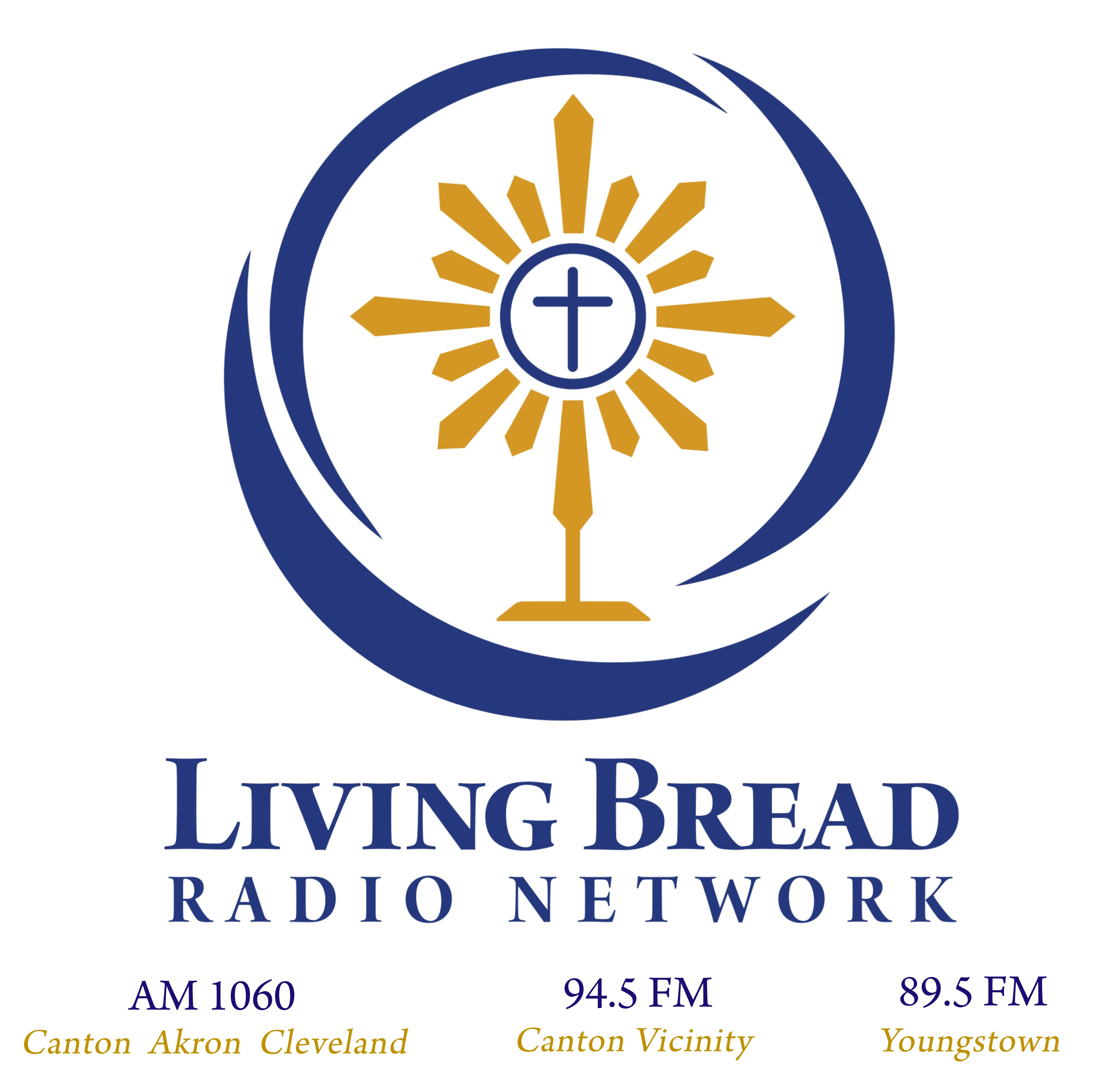
- Canton, Ohio; United States
- Broadcast area: Canton–Akron–Cleveland
- Frequency: 1060 kHz

Programming
- Format: Catholic radio
- Network: Living Bread Radio Network
- Affiliations: EWTN Radio

Ownership
- Owner: Living Bread Radio Inc.

History
- First air date: August 11, 1946; 79 years ago
- Call sign meaning: "I am the Living Bread"

Technical information
- Licensing authority: FCC
- Class: D
- Power: 15,000 watts days only
- Translator: 94.5 W233CE (Canton)
- Repeater: 89.5 WILB-FM (Boardman)

Links
- Public license information: Public file; LMS
- Webcast: WILB Live Feed
- Website: www.livingbreadradio.com

WILB (1060 kHz) is an AM radio station in Canton, Ohio. It is owned by Living Bread Radio and it airs Catholic radio programming to the Canton, Akron and Cleveland areas. All shows are simulcast on co-owned 89.5 WILB-FM in Boardman.

WILB is a daytimer station. By day, it broadcasts with 15,000 watts. As 1060 AM is a clear channel frequency reserved for Class A station (KYW Philadelphia), to avoid interference, WILB only broadcasts during daytime hours. Programming is also available on FM translator W233CE on 94.5 FM. While 1060 AM can only broadcast during daylight hours, the FM translator provides 24-hour Catholic radio to the Canton area.

== History ==
=== WCMW, WHOF and WOIO ===
The station signed on the air on August 11, 1946. It was owned by Stark Broadcasting Company and its original call sign was WCMW. Start Broadcasting also established 94.9 WCMW-FM at about the same time. The FM station went off the air around 1953, and the frequency went unused until 1960 when WDBN (now WQMX) signed on. By 1961 the AM station had become WHOF, and it was a Top 40 outlet in the early 1960s.

In 1967 the call letters were changed again, this time to WOIO. From that point until 1976, WOIO had a full service radio format of middle of the road music, sports, talk and news. It was a network affiliate of the CBS Radio Network.

=== Top 40 WQIO ===
After going through several more format changes, it once again became a Top 40 station in the fall of 1976 as WQIO (using the slogan "Q-10"). It was successful for the next few years, drawing the highest ratings in the history of the station, and driving competitor WINW (also a daytime station) out of the format.

When 106.9 FM in Canton (co-owned with WINW) changed to WOOS with an automated Top 40 format in 1978, WQIO's days as a Top 40 radio station were numbered, and by the fall of 1979 it began to head in a more adult contemporary direction.

In 1980, WQIO filed an application with the Federal Communications Commission (FCC) to move the station from Canton to Canal Fulton, and broadcast full-time on 1070 kHz with 1,000 watts daytime and 500 watts nighttime. While this would have allowed WQIO to operate 24 hours a day, a Pittsburgh station also applied for the same frequency, and neither of the applications was granted, nor was WQIO able to acquire an FM station. (It had passed on the chance to acquire 106.9, which went to WINW, and later pursued 95.9 in New Philadelphia, Ohio, with an eye towards moving its tower closer to Canton, but was unsuccessful.) Faltering in the ratings, WQIO switched to a country music format in 1981, but soon was put up for sale.

=== AC and talk ===
The station was purchased by Arcey Broadcasting, which changed the call letters to WRCW on June 14, 1982. The "RC" in the Arcey name and the call letters came from the initials of owner Ronald D. Colaner, who had joined the station in 1965 as a part-time engineer. Over the years, WRCW ran a varied mixture of talk shows and adult contemporary music, as well as specialty programming on weekends, most notably an oldies show hosted by local personality Ricco that ran for 18 years. WRCW also aired a live Sunday-morning broadcast of southern gospel music that featured the South Land Gospel Boys. That program was heard since the early 1960s.

In 1998, Arcey tried to sell the station to Otter Communications, headed by Dan Ott of Youngstown, but the sale did not go through. The call sign was briefly changed to WTOF on December 7, 1998, but it was changed back to WRCW on February 1, 1999.

=== Catholic radio ===
After 22 years, Arcey Broadcasting sold the station to Living Bread Radio in April 2004 for $300,000. The station switched its call sign to WILB on July 1, 2004. It adopted a Catholic-oriented format, primarily airing programming EWTN Radio.

In 2016, WILB purchased an FM translator, W233CE (94.5); it went on the air September 8, 2016.
