= WKDD =

Radio station in Munroe Falls, Ohio, serving Akron

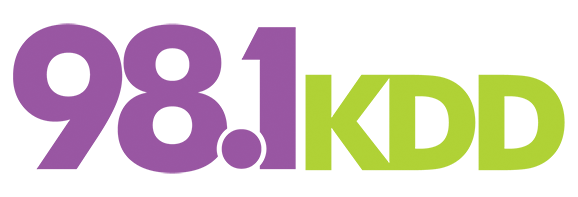
- Munroe Falls, Ohio; United States
- Broadcast area: Akron metro area; Canton metro area; Greater Cleveland
- Frequency: 98.1 MHz (HD Radio)
- Branding: 98.1 KDD

Programming
- Language: English
- Format: Hot adult contemporary
- Subchannels: HD2: Air1
- Affiliations: Premiere Networks

Ownership
- Owner: iHeartMedia, Inc.; (iHM Licenses, LLC)
- Sister stations: WHLO; WHOF; WRQK-FM

History
- First air date: November 19, 1961
- Former call signs: WTOF (1961–1985); WTOF-FM (1985–1997); WHK-FM (1997–2001); WAKS (2001)

Technical information
- Licensing authority: FCC
- Facility ID: 43863
- Class: B
- ERP: 50,000 watts
- HAAT: 138 meters (453 ft)
- Transmitter coordinates: 41°12′0.2″N 81°31′22.4″W
- Translator: See § Translators

Links
- Public license information: Public file; LMS
- Webcast: Listen live (via iHeartRadio)
- Website: wkdd.iheart.com

WKDD (98.1 FM) is a commercial radio station licensed to Munroe Falls, Ohio, United States, featuring a hot adult contemporary format known as "98.1 KDD". Owned by iHeartMedia, Inc., the station serves both the Akron-Canton metro area, with additional coverage in Greater Cleveland and much of surrounding Northeast Ohio. WKDD's studios are located in North Canton, while the transmitter is located in Cuyahoga Falls. In addition to a standard analog transmission, WKDD broadcasts over two HD Radio channels, and streams online via iHeartRadio.

== History ==
=== WTOF / WTOF-FM ===
In 1960, Edwin Mortenson moved to Canton, Ohio, and began construction on a new 50,000-watt FM radio station: WTOF at 98.1 megahertz (MHz). Mortenson had tired of losing his radio ministry whenever a new station owner would come along and flip his affiliate's format; he resolved to build his own radio station to keep his religious shows on the air – WTOF-FM was that station. Broadcasting a Christian format under the name "Tower of Faith" (the origin of the "WTOF" call letters), the station served the Canton area for decades, and was just the first of several stations to come under Mortenson's ownership – the start of Mortenson Broadcasting. In 1985, the station changed its callsign to WTOF-FM after briefly owning WTOF (900 AM).

=== WHK-FM (98.1) ===
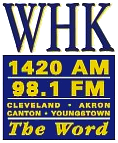
Station logo as WHK-FM

In 1997, Mortenson opted to sell off WTOF-FM, and Akron-licensed station WHLO (640 AM), to California-based Salem Communications. Salem had already purchased WHK (1420 AM) the previous year and flipped its format from sports radio to religious programming. After the deal closed, on June 13, 1997, WTOF became WHK-FM, simulcasting WHK full-time on weekdays, with a separate weekend schedule of Christian programming.

During this time, nationally syndicated area pastor Alistair Begg aired daily on both WHK and WHK-FM. In October 1997, both stations broadcast live from the "Stand in the Gap" rally held by Promise Keepers. In September 2000, WHK-FM joined Rock Contemporary Christian Radio Inc., a radio network airing contemporary Christian music.

=== 2001 "frequency swap" ===
On July 3, 2001, WHK-FM was one of seven Northeast Ohio radio stations involved in a complex exchange between three radio companies. Although generally reported as a "frequency swap", in reality these seven radio stations mostly traded callsigns along with their respective formats and staffs – all to facilitate the transfers of ownership of four of the seven stations. As part of this complex exchange, Salem Communications sold WHK-FM to Clear Channel Communications; both companies retained their respective on- and off-air staff. Clear Channel then changed the WHK-FM callsign to WAKS; and changed the station's format to hot adult contemporary (hot AC). Less than one month later, on July 23, 2001, Clear Channel changed the station's callsign to WKDD. In effect, this new WKDD (98.1 FM) licensed to Canton became the successor to the previous WKDD (96.5 FM) licensed to Akron.

=== 98.1 WKDD ===
On October 29, 2008, the station became licensed to the Akron suburb of Munroe Falls, Ohio. WKDD had a construction permit to return to the Akron area broadcast facility once occupied by its 96.5 FM predecessor, in Cuyahoga Falls, Ohio. On December 18, 2009, 30-year morning host Matt Patrick hosted his last show on WKDD. Longtime co-host Barbara "B.A." Adams returned to join Matt for his last show (Matt soon became the morning show host at WTRC and WTRC-FM in South Bend, Indiana, and later worked at KTRH in Houston, Texas). After playing "Home" by Michael Bublé, the new morning show "Keith & Krissy" was announced, hosted by WKDD programming operations director Keith Kennedy, and Patrick's former co-host, Krissy Taylor. The station also changed their on-air branding at this time to "Akron's 98-1 The New WKDD" with the slogan "Akron's Hit Music Station".

Each February since 2000, WKDD teams up with Akron Children's Hospital for the "Have a Heart, Do Your Part Radiothon" to benefit the hospital. Radiothon airs live on WKDD all weekend long. The event was hosted for many years by Matt Patrick and Barbara Adams, and later by Angela, Keith and Krissy.

On September 7, 2010, WKDD moved its signal back to its Cuyahoga Falls broadcast location, formerly used by the station in their 96.5 days, to improve the quality of its signal in the Akron area, especially northern Summit County. The station also adopted a slightly new format playing music from "the '90s, 2k and Today", however some 1980's songs are also in the playlist. In early 2012, WKDD gradually moved to a contemporary hit radio (CHR) format. Around 2020, the station's on-air schedule began to consist of majority voice tracked talent. The same music feed and some of the talent heard on the station could also be heard on iHeartRadio's "Today's Mix", which is the national hot AC programming of Premium Choice.

== Programming ==
The only local personality on WKDD is afternoon host Keith Kennedy; the majority of other programming is devoted to music, much of which is provided by iHeartMedia's internal Premium Choice network. As of October 2026, The Fred Show, syndicated via Premiere Networks, airs weekday mornings. American Top 40, also syndicated via Premiere Networks, airs Sunday mornings.

== Translators ==
WKDD's second HD Radio subchannel, which simulcasts the Air1 network, is relayed over two low-power translators in both the Akron and Cleveland markets:

Broadcast translators for WKDD-HD2
Call sign	Frequency	City of license	FID	ERP (W)	HAAT	Class	Transmitter coordinates	FCC info
W224CD	92.7 FM	Parma, Ohio	142417	99	278.9 m (915 ft)	D	41°22′58.2″N 81°42′6.5″W	LMS
W273BL	102.5 FM	Akron, Ohio	141395	74	279 m (915 ft)	D	41°3′53.2″N 81°34′58.4″W	LMS
