= WHOF =

Radio station in North Canton, Ohio

- North Canton, Ohio; United States
- Broadcast area: Canton metro area Akron metro area
- Frequency: 101.7 MHz (HD Radio)
- Branding: Sunny 101.7

Programming
- Language: English
- Format: Classic hits
- Subchannels: HD2: Country "99.7 Canton's New Country"
- Affiliations: iHeartRadio

Ownership
- Owner: iHeartMedia, Inc.; (iHM Licenses, LLC)
- Sister stations: WHLO; WKDD; WRQK-FM

History
- First air date: July 25, 1968
- Former call signs: WJER-FM (1968–2006)
- Call sign meaning: "Hall Of Fame City"

Technical information
- Licensing authority: FCC
- Facility ID: 73135
- Class: A
- ERP: 6,000 watts
- HAAT: 81 meters (266 ft)
- Transmitter coordinates: 40°49′22″N 81°25′41″W
- Translator: HD2: 99.7 W259BW (Canton)

Links
- Public license information: Public file; LMS
- Webcast: Listen live (via iHeartRadio); Listen live (HD2)
- Website: sunny1017.iheart.com cantonsnewcountry.iheart.com (HD2)

WHOF (101.7 FM) is a commercial radio station licensed to North Canton, Ohio, carrying a classic hits format known as "Sunny 101.7". Owned by iHeartMedia, Inc., the station serves both the Canton and Akron metro areas and is the local affiliate for syndicated personalities Ron Wilson and Jim Brickman. WHOF's studios are located in North Canton, while the station transmitter resides in Canton. In addition to standard analog transmission, WHOF broadcasts over two HD Radio channels, and is available online via iHeartRadio. WHOF's HD2 digital subchannel features a country format under the brand "99.7 Canton's New Country", and is relayed over Canton-licensed low-power translator W259BW (99.7 FM).

== History ==
WHOF began as WJER-FM, under license to Dover, Ohio, on July 25, 1968, the FM sister to WJER (1450 AM). On April 14, 2006, the Federal Communications Commission approved a request from the station's owners, iHeartMedia (then known as Clear Channel Communications) to move the WJER-FM city of license to North Canton, Ohio. On December 27, 2006, the station adopted a new callsign, WHOF, and signed off. On January 16, 2007, WHOF signed back on as My 101.7 with an adult contemporary format; Billy Joel's "My Life" was the first song to air.

On September 4, 2015, WHOF dismissed all on-air staff and began stunting with 80s music, teasing a change to come the following Tuesday at 8 am. At that time, rumors abounded that WHOF would adopt the country format of its HD2 channel. The "Something Different" turned out to be a 1980s-oriented variety hits format, as WHOF removed all current/recurrent music. The first song under the variety hits format was "My Town" by the Michael Stanley Band.

On November 19, 2018, My 101.7 flipped to its seasonal Christmas music format and on their website, it said to tune in on December 26, at 9 a.m. to hear a new format. This is pretty odd since the Variety Hits format that My 101.7 was ranked number 3 in the market with a 5.0 share. On December 26, 2018 at 9 am, WHOF launched an adult contemporary format, branded as "Sunny 101.7".

In February 2021, the station switched to a classic hits format, focusing on music from the 1960s-1980s, still keeping the "Sunny" branding.

== WHOF-HD2 ==
Country music accounts for all regular programming on the HD2 digital subchannel. Branded 99.7 Canton's New Country, WHOF-HD2 also simulcasts over Canton translator W259BW (99.7 FM), owned and operated by iHeartMedia. The transmitter for W259BW is located off 22nd St NW in Canton on a tower also utilized by WHOF and full-power sister station WRQK-FM.

WHOF-HD2/W259BW serves as the regional affiliate for The Bobby Bones Show; all other regular content, including station imaging, voice-over audio, music and on-air talent, either comes from the iHeartMedia country national format via the Premium Choice "iHeartRadio Country" network, or is voice-tracked out-of-market specifically for the subchannel/translator.

Broadcast translator for WHOF-HD2
Call sign	Frequency	City of license	FID	ERP (W)	HAAT	Class	Transmitter coordinates	FCC info
W259BW	99.7 FM	Canton, Ohio	144998	250	67 m (220 ft)	D	40°49′22″N 81°25′41″W	LMS
