= Kaya Jones =

American singer & model (born 1984)

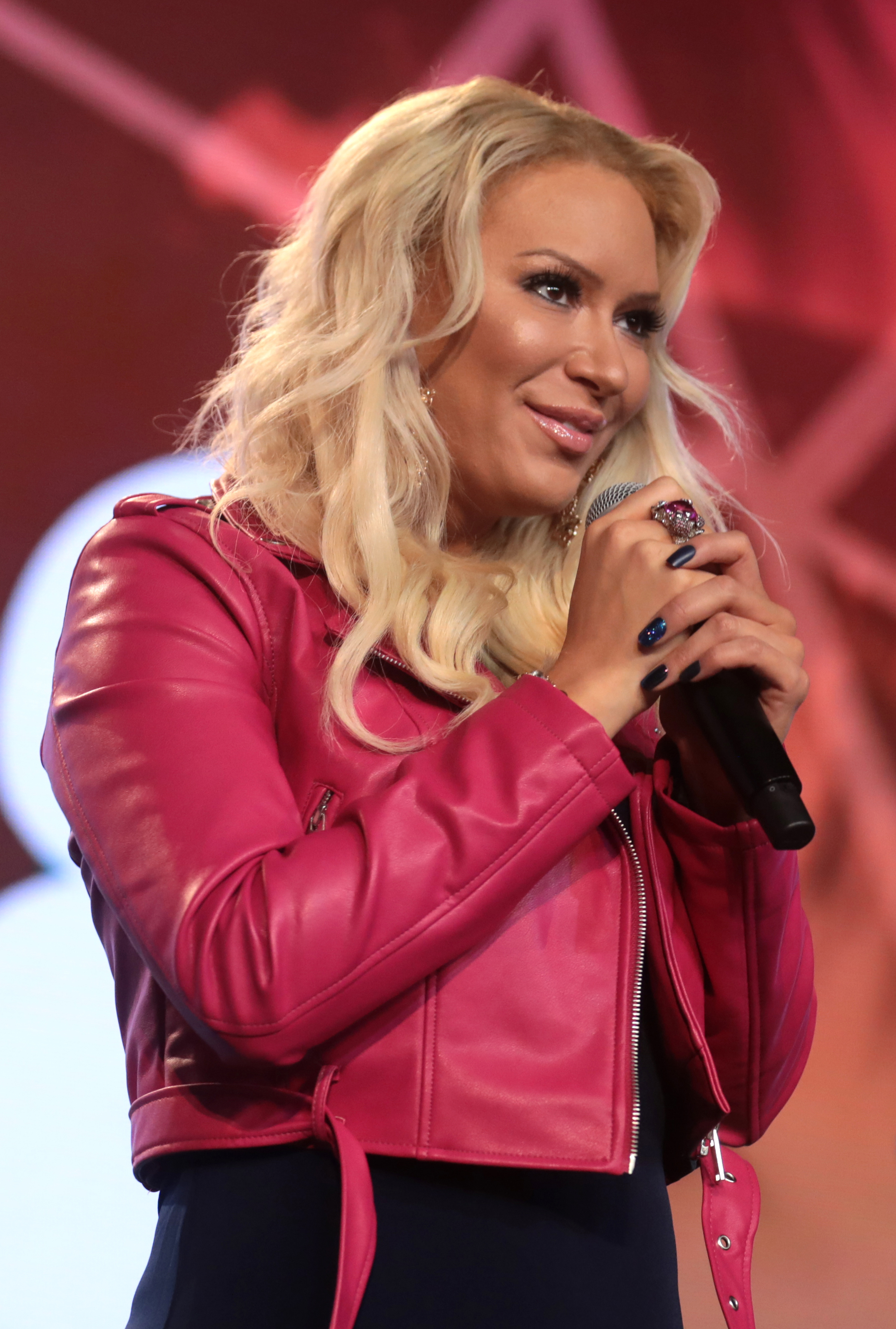
- Jones performing in 2018

Background information
- Born: Chrystal Neria; August 28, 1984 (age 41); Toronto, Ontario, Canada
- Origin: Las Vegas, Nevada, U.S.
- Genres: Pop
- Occupations: Singer; dancer; DJ
- Instruments: Vocals; violin
- Years active: 2001–present
- Labels: Interscope (2003–2004); Capitol (2001–2002)
- Formerly of: The Pussycat Dolls
- Website: kayajones.com

Chrystal Neria (born August 28, 1984), known professionally as Kaya Jones, is a Canadian-born American singer and model. She originally became known in 2003 for performing with the American girl group the Pussycat Dolls. Since 2004, she has pursued a solo career in music.

In 2017, she joined the National Diversity Coalition for Trump as their Native American Ambassador for Trump, despite not being a member of any recognized tribe and having no evidence of indigenous ancestry.

== Early life ==
Chrystal Neria was born into an ethnically Jewish Christian family in Toronto, Ontario on August 28, 1984. She was raised in Las Vegas, Nevada.

== Career ==
After Robin Antin struck a deal with Interscope Records to form the Pussycat Dolls into a brand, auditions were held for a recording group that would not include celebrity members. In December 2003, Jones was recruited as a vocalist alongside Nicole Scherzinger and Melody Thornton. She performed with the group for the first time on February 13, 2004, where they performed "Big Spender" live at the MTV Asia Awards. Jones provided vocals for "We Went as Far as We Felt Like Going" for the Shark Tale soundtrack and the single, "Sway" which is featured on the soundtrack of Shall We Dance?, as well as appearing in the music video for the latter. She performed with the group at the VH1 Divas 2004 where they sung "Tainted Love" (with Carmen Electra), "You Can Leave Your Hat On" (with Tom Jones) and "Girls on Film" before joining the headliners in a finale performance of "New Attitude" alongside Patti LaBelle. The group also performed "Tainted Love" at the 2004 Fashion Rocks, along with Marc Almond.

There has been controversy over whether or not she was ever a full member of the group. Antin has stated that Jones "was never an official member of the group". Jones left the group in September 2004 while the group was recording their debut album, claiming that it was no longer fun to be in the band. She told Yahoo! Singapore, "When everyone is not on the same page it affects the group so that I think was the worst part and I decided to leave". Jones repeatedly made allegations that the Pussycat Dolls was a prostitution ring. She has claimed that she and her bandmates were abused by music industry executives. The group has denied the allegations.

After appearing with the Pussycat Dolls, Jones began a solo career in music. She released her first single, "Hollywood Doll," in 2009. Her next single, "Take It Off," was performed with DJ Regi and had a lukewarm reception in Europe, where it charted in the United Kingdom, Poland, and Belgium. In 2011, Jones started a record company called HueMan Race Records, Inc.

== Politics ==
Jones is a conservative, previously registering as a Democrat but switching after becoming a born-again Christian, and an outspoken supporter of Donald Trump. She has appeared on the Fox News show Hannity several times, beginning with an appearance in June 2017.

In December 2017, Jones announced she had joined the National Diversity Coalition for Trump, where she is listed as a director with the title Native American Ambassador for Trump. With this announcement, she began to draw heavy criticism from prominent members of the Native American community, and accusations of being a "pretendian". Jones has claimed to have Apache heritage, but Native American journalists state that no Apache tribe claims her, and that there is no confirmation of any Native ancestry for Jones.

== Discography ==
- Kaya (2012)
- Confessions of a Hollywood Doll (2012)
- Rise of the Phoenix (2015)
- The Chrystal Neria Album (2015)
- The Royal Collection (2025)
