= KGGR =

Radio station in Dallas, Texas

Dallas, Texas; United States
- Broadcast area: Dallas/Fort Worth Metroplex
- Frequency: 1040 kHz
- Branding: KGGR 1040 AM

Programming
- Format: Urban gospel

Ownership
- Owner: MARC Radio Group; (MARC Radio Dallas, LLC)

History
- First air date: June 8, 1947 as KIXL
- Former call signs: KIXL (1947–1973), KPBC (1973–1990)
- Call sign meaning: Great Gospel Radio

Technical information
- Licensing authority: FCC
- Class: D
- Power: 3,300 watts day 2,800 watts critical hours
- Transmitter coordinates: 32°46′43″N 96°43′52″W
- Translator: 106.9 K295DA (Dallas)

Links
- Public license information: Public file; LMS
- Webcast: Listen Live
- Website: kggram.com

KGGR (1040 AM) is a commercial radio station, licensed to Dallas, Texas and serving the Dallas-Fort Worth Metroplex. It is owned by MARC Radio Group, through licensee MARC Radio Dallas, LLC, and airs an urban gospel radio format, in place since 1990. The call sign stands for Great Gospel Radio.

KGGR is a daytimer station. By day, it transmits with 3,300 watts; however, since AM 1040 is a clear channel frequency reserved for Class A WHO in Des Moines, Iowa, KGGR must sign-off at night to avoid interference. During critical hours, the station broadcasts at 2,800 watts. It uses a non-directional antenna, located off Military Parkway in South Dallas.

== History ==
On June 8, 1947, the station signed on the air as KIXL. The station was owned by Variety Broadcasting led by Lee Segall, and included celebrity stockholders Greer Garson and William Holden. Later on, it founded a sister station, KIXL-FM on 104.5 MHz, later known as KEZT and now as KKDA-FM. Segall programmed a long-running and successful beautiful music format on KIXL, which was simulcast on KIXL-FM ("104 on both dials").

In the 1970s and 1980s, the station was owned by Crawford Broadcasting as KPBC, featuring Contemporary Christian music until a new 24-hour station at 770 kHz was created by Crawford.

Studios were located at 1401 South Akard in Dallas from 1947 to 1973, at 3201 Royalty Row in Irving (same as present KAAM), and in south west Dallas after the mid nineties. KGGR increased its day power to 3,300 watts in the early 2000s, but still as a daytimer. It moved to studios located at Highway 67 beside Executive Air Park (former Red Bird Airport). An FM translator was licensed to rebroadcast KGGR on 102.5 MHz in January 2009. K273BJ 102.5 no longer simulcasts KGGR, but 94.9 KLTY-FM-HD2, which airs a Spanish-language Contemporary Christian format known as "El Pez" (The Fish). KGGR does simulcast from a new translator, K295DA (106.9 MHz) in Dallas.

KGGR's former sister stations KHVN and KKGM were purchased by iHeartMedia and they became affiliates of the Black Information Network, leaving KGGR as the only Gospel-formatted station in the metroplex.

On December 30, 2021, Florida-based MARC Radio Group announced its intent to acquire KGGR and K295DA from Mortenson Broadcasting for $650,000. The sale was consummated on April 13, 2022.
