= Wedlease =

Type of marital contract

A wedlease is a proposed type of marital contract in which two spouses agree to enter a marriage of limited duration with an opportunity for renewal.

The concept and term can be traced to a 2013 opinion piece in The Washington Post by estate lawyer Paul Rampell. Wedleases have since been discussed in numerous other publications.

In the original op-ed, Rampell describes a wedlease as:

“[t]wo people commit themselves to marriage for a period of years—one year, five years, 10 years, whatever term suits them. The marital lease could be renewed at the end of the term however many times a couple likes. It could end up lasting a lifetime if the relationship is good and worth continuing. But if the relationship is bad, the couple could go their separate ways at the end of the term. The messiness of divorce is avoided and the end can be as simple as vacating a rental unit.”

Thus, Rampell describes the wedlease as not a replacement for conventional marriage, but an extension of options available to couples while avoiding the administrative burden posed by divorce. By placing a limit on the duration of the marriage, Rampell argues that couples may utilize a wedlease contract as a practical way to test drive a marriage for a limited period of time while protecting themselves and their personal effects. Furthermore, Rampell argues that the wedlease neither attacks nor undermines religious views of marriage as it is a secular legal instrument.

Despite the idea's popularity, no one to date (as of October 2025) has signed a contractual, fixed-term wedlease, also known as a Premarital Agreement Limited Term (“PALT”). The practice has been compared to the Shi'ite Nikah mut'ah practice, which allows for certain Muslim men to take temporary wives for a dowry under a private contract.

== Etymology ==
Coined by Rampell, the term ‘wedlease’ is derived from wedlock, meaning marriage, and lease, which is a contract for a limited amount of time.

== Limited-term marriage around the world ==
=== Legislation ===
Time-limited marriage contracts have been considered legislatively in the following jurisdictions:

- Maryland 1971 (proposed three-year contract)
- Germany 2007 (proposed seven-year contract)
- Mexico City 2011 (couples could decide length, with two years as the minimum)

Thus far, no jurisdiction has adopted issuing limited term marriage licenses.

=== Academic study ===
Stefania Marcassa and Gregory Pothiere of the Paris School of Economics used a two-period collective household model to show that short-term marriage contracts, if available, would dominate long-term contracts in their 2011 published paper, “Until Death Do Us Part? The Economics of Short-Term Marriage Contracts.”

In 2016, Jan M. Smits of Maastricht University — Maastricht European Private Law Institute published “Till Death Do Us Part? On Lifelong and Fixed-Term Marriage” who used comparative legal analysis to assess the idea of a short-term marriage license.

== Evolution of marriage over time ==
Marriage has undergone many changes and has been experienced in many forms. The diversity of marriages and evolution of western marriage throughout the centuries may permit an idea like the wedlease to take hold. Marriage was practiced as early as the Paleolithic era as hunter-gatherer groups forged alliances outside of local community and family groups through marriage to access critical resources. Traditional western marriage recognizable to Americans today began in A.D. 313 when Emperor Theodosius declared Christianity the official religion of the Roman Empire. But as the Roman Empire broke down, the Catholic Church began to dominate politics, culture, and religion. Vehemently against divorce, the Catholics declared it a sin against the sanctity of marriage and made separation nearly unattainable. The Church's position against divorce grew stronger with its abolition in the late twelfth century from Church doctrine. King Henry VIII famously altered marriage (and divorce) in 1534 by establishing the Church of England so that he could regulate his own marital affairs without interference. This was a key historical event in the privatization of marriage, which had once been a more publicly and institutionally regulated affair.

Marriage only became an increasingly private affair in the so-called love revolution that resulted from economic growth and new philosophical ideas in the seventeenth and eighteenth centuries. Market economies spurred the growth of cities and job opportunities off the farm for young people. They were free to develop relationships away from the watchful eyes of parents and gained economic independence at an earlier age than had previous generations. At the same time, Enlightenment thinkers, championing individual rights, emphasized the right of people to organize their own lives and pursue marriage based on love and compatibility. The proliferation of democratic ideals in Europe and America promoted the idea that marriage should be a result of free choice.

During this time, U.S. courts played a limited role in shaping the institution, choosing to enforce laws strictly and to uphold the strong national preference for lifelong marriages. Early on in U.S. history, states passed statutes providing the limited circumstances under which a couple might obtain an absolute divorce: adultery, incest, bigamy (the act of going through a marriage ceremony while already married to another), abandonment, or extreme cruelty. South Carolina prohibited divorce altogether.

Marriage in the U.S. changed again post World War II with national recognition that marriage was a fundamental right and that a married couple had the right to privately arrange the terms of their own marriage. In Griswold v Connecticut (1965), a Connecticut law banning the use of contraceptives was struck down by the Supreme Court as a violation of the right to marital privacy. On Griswold’s heels came Loving v. Virginia (1967) where the Supreme Court rejected Virginia’s anti-miscegenation laws by holding that marriage was a basic civil right fundamental to “existence and survival,” allowing for interracial marriages thereafter.

One third of couples married in the 1950s eventually divorced and grounds for “fault” divorce were broadening, paving the path for the legalization of “no-fault” divorce in the 1970s. Women gained the right to apply for and receive credit in 1974 as increasing economic freedom and higher rates of college education for women coincided with marital freedoms. Women joined the workforce in droves, altering family and marriage life. Divorce rates began to rise.

Over the centuries, not only did marriage and divorce change, but so did the prevalence and acceptance of the prenuptial agreement. The prenuptial agreement gained significant legal standing in 1983 with the Uniform Premarital Agreement Act, which standardized and strengthened prenuptial agreements so that couples could protect their assets in the face of separation. Prenuptial agreements had previously been viewed with skepticism and were accused of incentivizing divorce, pitting them in opposition to U.S. public policy. According to the University of Chicago Press, the introduction and standardization of prenuptial agreements correlated with lower divorce rates for couples who had signed them, though variables such as financial standing and education may also play a role. It is well understood today that prenuptial agreements are not against public policy and do not incentivize divorce.

Since the wedlease's publicity in 2013, the largest change to marriage was the legalization of same-sex marriage in the United States by the Supreme Court in the landmark 5-4 Obergefell v. Hodges (2015) decision, which aligned with the centuries-long trend toward marital and family privacy in the United States. Today, same-sex marriages divorce at about the same rate as heterosexual marriages.

There has been a subsequent rise in tolerance toward divorce in the United States. Where divorce was once seen as moral failure, family tragedy, and/or religious taboo, many Americans now believe that divorcing is better for family life and children's wellbeing than staying in an unfulfilling partnership.

A 2022 Gallup Poll found that 81% of participants find divorce morally acceptable. One recent phenomenon since about 2020 is to celebrate the courage it takes to leave a bad marriage—Amazon now has an entire category of party supplies for Divorce Parties, sometimes called Divorce Ceremonies.

Though tolerance for divorce is up, some studies disagree that divorce makes us happier. Dr. Melissa Kearney dedicated an entire book to what she calls "two parent privilege," noting that children who grow up in two-parent households have much better economic outcomes than those who don't. Divorce rates continue to hover at about 43% with divorces for older generations, especially baby boomers, on the rise.

== Wedlease analysis ==
The viability of Rampell's proposal is predicated on both cultural acceptance and legal viability.

=== Cultural viability ===
According to Forbes, just under half (43%) of all first marriages in the United States end in divorce; second and third marriages have 60% and 73% divorce rates, respectively.

More couples are cohabitating before marriage than did previous generations, and according to the CDC, Americans are getting married later in life, if at all. As of 2021, a record-high 25% of 40-year-olds in the United States had never been married. Millennials and Gen Z are far more open to signing prenups than previous generations. The wedlease model could be popular amongst those already cohabitating before marriage, those cautious of marriage, and those already signing prenuptial agreements.

Divorce is getting more expensive, its cost having gone up between 10 and 30% since the year 2000, accounting for inflation. The average cost of a divorce in 2025 in the United States is $11,300 and the median cost is $7,000, according to Martindale-Rolo Research; disputed divorces and divorces with children are higher. The potential for a marital lease to quietly expire with no added costs for families may make it an enticing alternative to traditional marriage and its impending divorce fees.

Divorce affects demographic groups differently. For example, lesbian marriages divorce at nearly twice the rate of heterosexual couples. According to the CDC, separated white women are much more likely (91 percent) to divorce after three years of separation, compared with separated Hispanic women (77 percent) and separated Black women (67 percent). The rate of “gray divorces,” divorces of those 65 and older, is on the rise; the rate of divorce for this demographic has tripled between 1990 and 2021. The expiration of a wedlease may be preferable to traditional divorce for one or more of these demographics. A wedlease could support women, particularly women of color, who may relinquish substantial resources when they forgo the legal divorce process.

More than half of young Americans still want to get married, and men and women desire marriage at relatively equal rates. Yet these numbers are on a downward trend, with fewer young Americans desiring to be married than previous generations. This has been flagged as an issue by some politicians and thought leaders like Bradley Wilcox, author of Get Married. A wedlease may incentivize more people to trial marriage who would have otherwise been dissuaded.

In summary, a short-term marriage lease may reduce divorce costs (both financial and emotional) in a country with relatively high divorce rates while simultaneously encouraging couples who might otherwise forgo marriage to give it a try.

=== Legal viability in the United States ===
As proposed by Paul Rampell, a wedlease would legally function as a prenuptial contract between two parties. The contract would include a schedule of joint and separate assets, capital set aside like a security deposit for escrow or arbitration, a termination date, and any other default provisions.

Borrowing from real estate, at the end of the wedlease, the option to renew, dissolve, or adjust the agreement would be available to both parties. The renewal could be a one-paragraph amendment which renews the term for X more years, and may not require the assistance of an attorney. Arbitration or traditional court could be utilized by non-renewing wedlease couples if the original contract failed to provide adequate direction for the dissolution.

Wedleases do not address child care, custody or support; the state still has interest in protecting the best interests of the child. Couples may agree that the wedlease term will automatically extend until a child born of a wedlease relationship reaches the age of maturity.

In treating the PALT like any other freely-entered partnership contract, breach of contract laws would apply. Consequences or damages could follow.

To legalize the first wedlease, a court would need to review the signed wedlease and rule that it is not against public policy; a judge would need to pass a declaratory judgement on the issue.

None of the marriage requirements for marriage licenses in any U.S. state explicitly outline that marriage must be a lifelong agreement; it will be up to judges as to whether that is implied or not. National recognition of no-fault divorce means that any marriage, in any state, may be terminated at any time, with no rationale required. Given that marriages automatically dissolve at the death of the first spouse, technically all marriage contracts have a limited term.

Should the judge agree that a fixed-term marriage contract is not contrary to public policy, the wedlease contract will become active, and the couple will be contractually beholden to their own agreement for its set number of years.

The final step to legalize the wedlease would be to state-sanction it, as in, to codify the legality of the wedlease into state law by passing a bill in the state legislature and having it approved by the state governor. Comity principles may then allow wedleased couples to have their marriages acknowledged across state boundaries.

Following legislative approval, various institutions would then determine how to interact with wedleased couples.

==== Public Policy Considerations ====
Antenuptial agreements in the United States were at first disfavored for two public policy-related reasons. First, it was believed they would encourage divorce. Second, such agreements generally did not fit into historical beliefs about the nature of the marital contract. Over time, these two views have been transformed and very little remains of the historical public policy considerations. Similarly, no-fault divorce used to be against public policy, but is not any longer. Courts cannot restrict the right to divorce in the United States.

The most frequent argument for holding antenuptial agreements that contemplate divorce invalid is that such agreements encourage or incite divorce or separation. There is little empirical evidence to show that this assertion is well founded. It may be equally argued that a contract which defines the expectations and responsibilities of the parties promotes rather than reduces marital stability.

On the second public policy consideration, there has been a similar radical transformation of courts regarding the nature of the marital contract. Courts initially considered the issue in a more paternalistic manner, for example not allowing women to contract away a right of support (see Graham vs Graham and Reiling vs Reiling). Now, with societal changes and the advent of no-fault divorce, the “essential incidents” of the marriage contract are – in most cases – left to the couple. The state's interest has evolved from being concerned about long-term support for women after a divorce to being mainly focused on whether antenuptial agreements are fairly executed.

In 2025, antenuptial agreements contracting away the right for post-divorce support are upheld using criteria related to fairness. Although the standards vary from state to state, the following three criteria are typically considered:

1. Was the agreement obtained through fraud, duress or mistake, or misrepresentation or nondisclosure of material fact?

2. Was the agreement unconscionable when executed?

3. Have the facts and circumstances changed since the agreement was executed, so as to make its enforcement unfair and unreasonable?

If none of the above factors are present, prenuptial agreements have generally been accorded judicial recognition. As the language in Brooks v. Brooks (Alaska 1987) demonstrates, rather than being viewed through a lens intended mainly to protect women, antenuptial agreements are now treated more like other types of contracts and are interpreted according to contract law.

This means that even unreasonable agreements will be enforced. The fact that the effect of a contract provision may be harsh for one of the contracting parties does not mean that the agreement is, for that reason alone, contrary to public policy, where the contract was freely entered.

A traditional marriage is essentially a contract without an end date. The general rule is that a contract which contains no express provision as to duration, or which is to remain in effect for an indefinite period of time, is not deemed to be perpetual, but instead may be terminated at will. Here, a PALT would allow parties to set the end date for the contract, much like partnership agreements set an end date.

A PALT would merely provide for the end of a marriage contract. Given the existence of no-fault divorce, there is little support for an argument that ending a marriage in and of itself is “against the public good.” In addition, ideas of appropriate public policy change over time and “given the imprecision of the public policy concept, “[c]ourts should be extremely cautious when called upon to declare a contract or provision thereof void on the ground of public policy.”

==== Institutional Adaptations ====
Ultimately, it will be up to courts, institutions, the public, and perhaps even the wedlease contracts themselves to decide if couples in wedleases should receive comparable marital benefits to those who elect traditional marriages.

The Internal Revenue Service (IRS) currently outlines important time stamps and marriage durations in the division of taxes, social security, and pensions in the event of a marriage dissolution. Their models could be adapted for wedleased couples and by other institutions and agencies as they navigate the dissemination of benefits.

Relationship status for tax purposes is currently decided by status on the last date of the previous calendar year. Couples must be married for at least one year to qualify for spousal social security benefits and must be married nine months to qualify for social security survivor benefits. In the U.S., a person can claim their ex-spouse's social security benefits (1) if they were married for over ten years, (2) they're over 62 years old, and (3) they're not remarried.

Between existing solutions for divorcees and ingenuity, institutions would be able to sort out how to define just how 'married' a couple is. 'Wedleased' couples may forgo some benefits that traditionally married couples enjoy.

== Counterarguments to the Wedlease ==
There are a number of counterarguments to the idea of the Prenuptial Agreement Limited Term (PALT). The introduction of a wedlease might have unexpected consequences on marriage and/or divorce rates and/or family well-being. The wedlease has been perceived as cynical and aromantic, anticipating the potential failure of a marriage before it has even begun. Some would thus prefer the hope or aspiration of a marriage lasting a lifetime. Those who believe marriage is a lifelong religious sacrament that may only be terminated in the most dire of circumstances (or never) are unlikely to view a marital lease favorably.

Some suggest that the children of such an agreement will experience instability as the renewal date for their parents’ lease approaches; children of couples who signed wedleases that then dissolved may experience the same amount of devastation as would a child of traditional divorce. The potential need for lawyers in both drafting a wedlease and/or terminating the prenuptial agreement and dividing assets may negate the contract's proposed ease and cost-efficiency.

Wedleased couples enjoying similar marital benefits, such as joint tax filings, to those religiously and/or traditionally married may create social unrest and division. Wedleased couples may be discriminated against by traditionally married couples, or vice versa. Some may argue that the value of their traditional marriage is tainted by the introduction of short-term marriage leases. It may be found that the wedlease is in fact contrary to public policy because it is deemed to incentivize divorce and oppose many states’ attempts to keep children with their families in two-parent households.

== See also ==
- Handfasting (Neopaganism)
- Marriage of convenience
- Nikah Misyar, in Sunni Islam
- Nikah mut‘ah, in Shia Islam
- Probationary marriage in Scotland
- Marriage § Temporary marriages
- Sponsalia de futuro
- Types of marriages
