= WRQK-FM =

Active rock radio station in Canton, Ohio

- Canton, Ohio; United States
- Broadcast area: Canton metro area; Akron metro area
- Frequency: 106.9 MHz (HD Radio)
- Branding: Rock 106-9

Programming
- Language: English
- Format: Mainstream rock
- Affiliations: iHeartRadio; United Stations Radio Networks

Ownership
- Owner: iHeartMedia, Inc.; (iHM Licenses, LLC)
- Sister stations: WHLO; WHOF; WKDD

History
- First air date: March 1, 1961
- Former call signs: WCNO (1961–1967); WNYN-FM (1967–1971); WHLQ (1971–1979); WOOS-FM (1979–1985); WRQK (1985–1989)
- Call sign meaning: "Rock"

Technical information
- Licensing authority: FCC
- Facility ID: 8550
- Class: B
- ERP: 27,500 watts
- HAAT: 103 meters (338 ft)
- Transmitter coordinates: 40°49′22″N 81°25′40″W

Links
- Public license information: Public file; LMS
- Webcast: Listen live (via iHeartRadio)
- Website: wrqk.iheart.com

WRQK-FM (106.9 MHz) is a commercial radio station licensed to serve Canton, Ohio, featuring a mainstream rock format known as "Rock 106.9". Owned by iHeartMedia, Inc., the station serves both the Canton and Akron metro areas and is the local affiliate for The House of Hair with Dee Snider. WRQK-FM's studios are located on Freedom Ave NW in North Canton, while the transmitter located off 22nd St NW in Canton. In addition to a standard analog transmission, WRQK-FM broadcasts in HD Radio, and is available online via iHeartRadio.

== History ==
WRQK-FM began broadcasting as WCNO on March 1, 1961. The new station was owned by the Greer Group, also owner of WAND in Canton; the two stations became WNYN and WNYN-FM in 1967. Both stations were purchased in 1965 by Don Keyes, who had made his mark as a national programmer for legendary station owner Gordon McLendon. In 1971, he sold the FM station to Susquehanna Radio Corporation, the owners of WHLO in Akron, whereupon WNYN-FM became WHLQ.

Susquehanna sold the station in 1978 to the owners of WINW, who applied to change the FM call letters to WHOF (for the "Hall of Fame" city of Canton) but were rebuffed by the owners of WTOF, another local FM station. (Coincidentally, WRQK-FM now has an iHearMedia, Inc. sister station in the Akron/Canton cluster using the WHOF call letters.) The station adopted an automated Top 40 format and became WOOS-FM on June 1, 1979.

WOOS-FM changed its call sign to WRQK on August 3, 1985, taking on an album oriented rock music format. For a while, the station called itself Goodrock 107, an apparent play on the name of the Goodyear Tire and Rubber Company in nearby Akron. It formally changed from WRQK to WRQK-FM on February 14, 1989, when WINW changed its call sign to WRQK. The AM station changed back to WINW six months later, but the FM call sign has remained WRQK-FM.

In 1995, the station was sold by Jim Embrescia's Canton/Akron Radio, Inc. to Sabre Communications. Then In 1997, SabreComm sold to Connoisseur Communications. Connoisseur sold their entire radio group to Cumulus Media. Then, on August 8, 2006, it was announced that WRQK-FM would be sold to Clear Channel Communications (now iHeartMedia, Inc.), pairing WRQK-FM with former sister station WHLO, as well as WARF, WKDD, and WHOF. Clear Channel took over operations of WRQK-FM on January 15, 2007, pending Federal Communications Commission approval of its purchase of the station from Cumulus.

In March 2007, WRQK-FM changed its branding from "Rock 107" to "Rock 106.9"; and also changed slogans from "Canton's Rock Station" to "It Just Rocks!", in an effort to also serve the Akron market, in early 2017 the station changed the slogan back to "Canton's Rock Station"

In June 2026, morning host Dan Stansbury was dismissed as part of nationwide layoffs by iHeartMedia. He was replaced by the syndicated Rover's Morning Glory, based at sister station WMMS, which can be heard in most of the Canton market. With this change, the station no longer has any local programming.

== Current programming ==
All programming is provided via iHeartRadio's internal Premium Choice network. WRQK-FM also airs The House of Hair with Dee Snider on weekends via United Stations Radio Networks. The HD2 digital subchannel carries a soft adult contemporary format branded as "The Breeze".
