= WCER (AM) =

Radio station in Canton, Ohio (1947–2011)

- WCER logo used during its mixed religious/talk format era
- Canton, Ohio; United States
- Broadcast area: Canton metro area
- Frequency: 900 kHz

Ownership
- Owner: Melodynamic Broadcasting Corp.

History
- First air date: 1947
- Last air date: September 14, 2011
- Former call signs: WAND (1947–61); WCNS (1961–67); WNYN (1967–85); WTOF (1985–88); WBXT (1988–92)
- Call sign meaning: "We're Christian Education Radio"; "Where Christ Ever Reigns"

Technical information
- Facility ID: 41131
- Class: D
- Power: 500 watts (daytime); 75 watts (nighttime)
- Transmitter coordinates: 40°49′17″N 81°25′34″W

WCER was a commercial radio station that was licensed to Canton, Ohio, on 900 AM, serving the Canton metropolitan area. The station broadcast from 1947 to 2011, ceasing operations when the owners voluntarily allowed their license to expire, and the Federal Communications Commission (FCC) cancelled it.

== History ==
The station began in 1947 as WAND. It became WCNS and later WNYN in the 1960s. WNYN, along with sister station WNYN-FM 106.9, was purchased in 1965 by Don Keyes, who had made his mark as a national programmer for legendary station owner Gordon McLendon. He sold the AM station sometime after 1971, when he sold WNYN-FM to Susquehanna Radio. The FM station became WHLQ, then WOOS, and is now WRQK-FM.

After Keyes sold the AM station, it was known as "Country 9" in the early 1980s to North Shore Communications, Inc. an Ohio Corporation created by Stephen Bloomfield, Frank Pintur, both University of Akron graduates, and acolytes of former WNYN station manager, Dr. William B. Sties. It featured a country music format in the 1980s and was affiliated with ABC's "Direction" news network. The station was purchased by Mortenson Broadcasting, then-owners of WTOF-FM 98.1, and accordingly changed call letters to WTOF on March 15, 1985.

After Mortenson sold the AM station, the call sign was changed to WBXT on March 1, 1988 (with a short-lived urban format), then to WCER on September 29, 1992. The WCER call letters originally stood for "Canton's Entertainment Radio", but have taken on different meanings with the station's Christian and religious-leaning format.

Owned by Melodynamic Broadcasting Corp., whose shareholders include Jack Ambrozic and former Cuyahoga County Judge Leodis Harris, WCER featured programming such as Alex Jones, Christian Teaching/Preaching, Derry Brownfield, Dave Ramsey, Dr. Laura, "The Patriot News Hour", and "The Flip Side" with Robby Noel. It also carried Walsh University football and high school football games.

On March 31, 2011, early reports began to surface that WCER would permanently cease operations by the end of that day. However, such plans were rescinded for undisclosed reasons, and WCER continued broadcasting. A lease agreement with Curtis A. Perry III, former programmer for WINW, took effect on July 8, 2011, and WCER dropped all existing talk programming for a revival of WINW's gospel music format.

WCER filed a "notification of silent operation" on September 27, 2011, stating that the station went off the air thirteen days earlier. Because the owners did not file an application to renew WCER's license, it expired on October 1, 2012, and was cancelled that October 5 by the Federal Communications Commission.
