= National Diversity Coalition for Trump =

Defunct U.S. political organization

The National Diversity Coalition for Trump (NDCTRUMP) was formed in April 2016 to provide support specifically from ethnic minorities for presidential candidate Donald Trump.

== History ==
The idea for the group arose after Trump's contentious meeting with African-American pastors at Trump Tower in November 2015. NDCTRUMP was co-founded by Darrell C. Scott. Bruce LeVell, the executive director of NDCTRUMP, was reportedly a contender for Trump's appointment to head the Small Business Administration.

A stated purpose of the coalition is to recruit, mobilize, and support educational efforts to elect Trump president and to demonstrate that Trump has support from people of color.

The coalition is a volunteer organization whose leaders are from minority communities of religious, business, and politics. Bruce LeVell serves as executive director. Other membership groups are: "Hispanic Patriots for Trump," "Sikh Americans for Trump," and "Minorities for Trump."

In April 2016, Telly Lovelace became the Republican National Committee's National Director of African American Initiatives and Media.

In June 2016, the Republican National Committee invited the coalition to meet with RNC deputy political director Jennifer Korn and national director of African American initiatives Telly Lovelace.

On September 5, 2017, Javier Palomarez, president and CEO of the United States Hispanic Chamber of Commerce, resigned as an advisor to NDCTRUMP due to Trump's attacks on DACA.

Singer Kaya Jones announced in December 2017 that she had joined the coalition, where she is listed as a director with the title Native American Ambassador for Trump. With this announcement, she began to draw heavy criticism from prominent members of the Native American community, and accusations of being a "pretendian".

== See also ==
- Rabia Kazan, Turkish ex-Muslim critic of Islam, former member of the group's Board of Directors, who later became disillusioned with her pro-Trump colleagues
