= Akron Baptist Temple =

Church in Ohio, United States

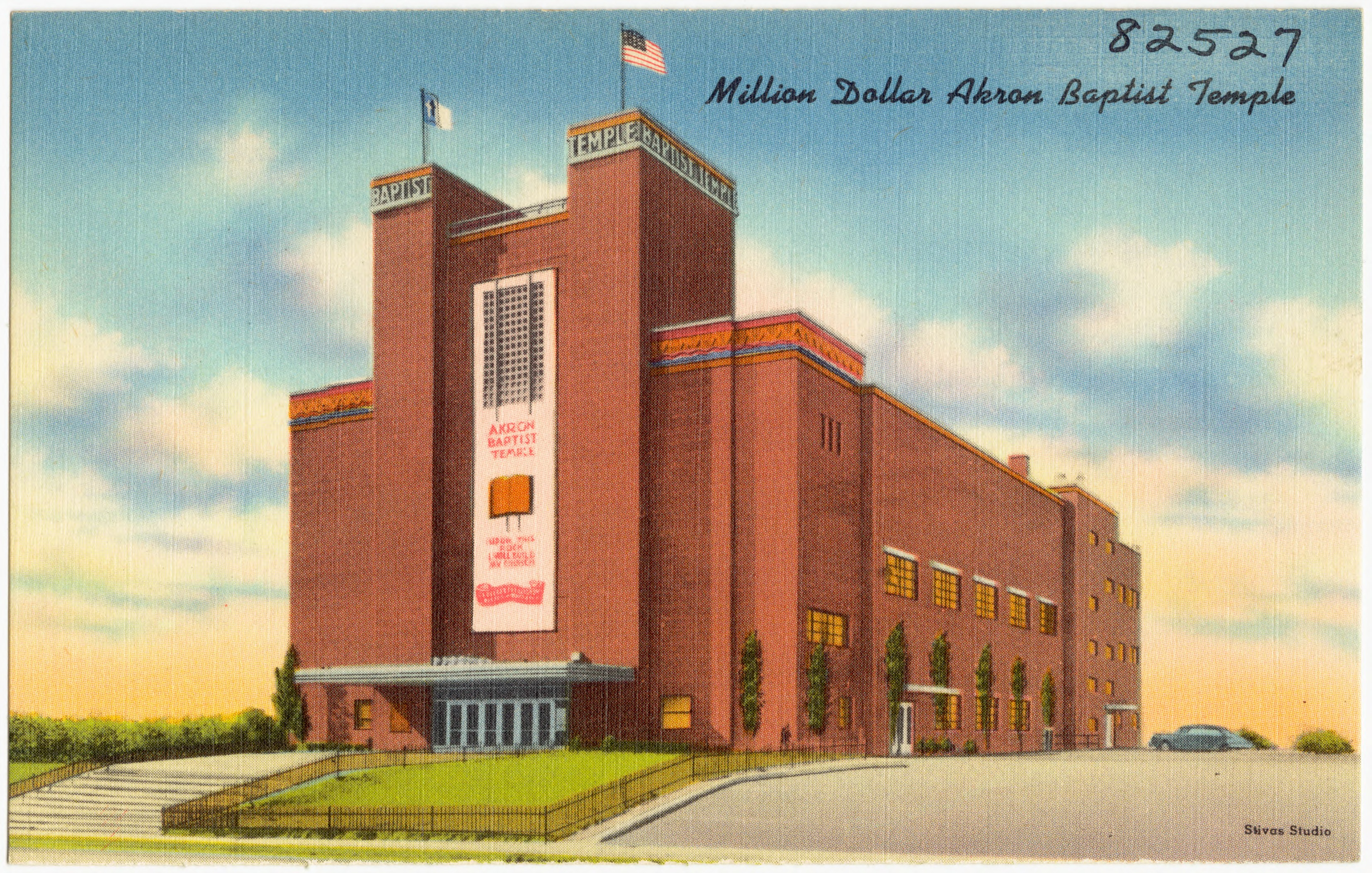
- A postcard of the church
- Akron Baptist Temple
- 41°02′09″N 81°32′47″W
- Location: 2324 Manchester Road, Akron, Ohio
- Country: United States
- Denomination: Baptist

History
- Founded: April 21, 1935
- Founder: Dallas F. Billington

Architecture
- Completed: 1937
- Construction cost: $2 million

Akron Baptist Temple was a Baptist house of worship located on Manchester Road in Akron, Ohio. The congregation first met in 1934, and the church was officially organized a year later. In the years that followed, Akron Baptist Temple grew to be one of the first megachurches in the United States, and at its peak was considered the largest church in North America. The church building was sold in 2019 and the congregation moved to Coventry Township and renamed themselves as Connect Church.

== History ==
=== Establishment ===
Akron Baptist Temple was established by Dallas F. Billington, a Kentucky native who moved to Akron in 1925. Billington, born in 1903, was the son of a Kentucky tobacco farmer. A Goodyear Tire employee, Billington studied theology at a Baptist correspondence school while working at a shoe factory in Paducah, Kentucky. Prior to the establishment of Akron Baptist Temple, he had preached at the Furnace Street Mission in Akron and had appeared on Akron radio, billing himself as the "Southern Evangelist".

Billington conducted his first service in 1934 at the Rimer Elementary School on Manchester Road. The church was among the first churches to take a practical approach to urban evangelism, without worrying about how promotion in the urban environment might corrupt the church theologically.

On April 21, 1935, the Akron Baptist Temple was officially organized with more than 80 charter members. Within six months, the congregation had grown to more than 500 followers.

=== Early history (1935–1972) ===
The congregation's first church building was erected in 1937, costing a total of $60,000 (equivalent to $1,343,750 in 2025). The church's membership grew so large that a speaker system had to be installed outside, and by 1949, the church's membership was estimated to be 10,000. A new church building was built in 1949; the new sanctuary featured a 2,800 seat auditorium and reportedly cost $2 million (equivalent to $27,062,937 in 2025). Visible from a distance of ten miles (16 km), this building stood 84 feet (26 m) tall and featured six-foot-high (1.8 m) red lettering that flashed "BAPTIST TEMPLE".

In July 1949, Life magazine published a photo-essay, noting that "At the doorway...ushers stand with mechanical counters and add up the people who file past them. The average total attendance, including a Bible class, a Sunday school and two church services, is 15,000 every Sunday, which Temple officials say is the biggest Baptist congregation in the U.S....pastor...Billington has systematically eliminated all the standard excuses for staying at a home. A fleet of buses tours Akron each Sunday to bring in people who do not have cars. Arrangements are made for private cars and ambulances...to pick up the aged and sick. And those with the biggest excuse of all--restless, crying children--are provided with a glass-enclosed 'Babyland'."

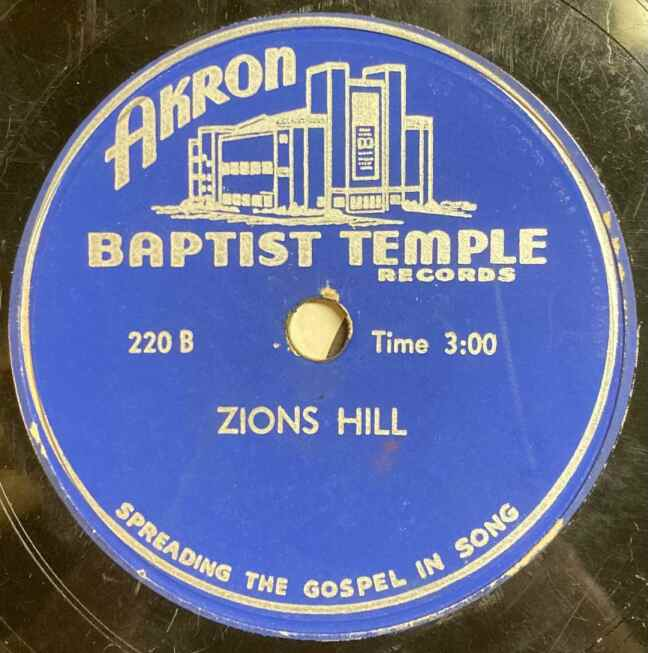
A 78rpm record produced by Akron Baptist Temple

The church became actively invested in media ministry, producing a radio program prior to occupying its first permanent building. Later operations included the establishment of its own record label, and broadcasting Sunday services on WAKR-TV. By the 1960s, the church claimed the title of the world's largest Sunday school, a claim confirmed by outside sources in 1969 when attendance of the church's Sunday school was listed in excess of 5,700. However, attendance would soon be in decline.

=== Current church (1972–present) ===
On August 26, 1972, Billington suffered a fatal heart attack. A 24-hour vigil was held; more than 18,000 mourners filed past the casket. Billington's son, Charles F. Billington, succeeded him as senior pastor.

The original 1937 temple was razed in 1978 to make room for a new 4,000 seat sanctuary that was dedicated in 1979. On May 9, 1981, the building caught fire in a suspected—but never proven—arson. Major congregations in Akron, including the Cathedral of Tomorrow, offered material support in service continuation and rebuilding. At the time of the fire, church membership stood at about 15,000, with attendance often reaching 7,000. The building was insured, with losses estimated at $7 million (equivalent to $24,789,531 in 2025), and the undamaged 2,700 seat sanctuary from 1949 was used until another 4,000 seat sanctuary was built in 1983 to replace the destroyed structure.

Charles Billington remained as senior pastor until 1996, when he was succeeded by his son, Dallas R. Billington, who served in the position of senior pastor until moving to Florida in 2007. Ed Holland took over the position that year and remains as the church's lead pastor.

With membership on the decline, Akron Baptist Temple sold its facility on Manchester Road in June 2018 to the Word Church, a predominantly African-American congregation, for $1.5 million. Akron Baptist Temple remained in the facility for 10 months following the sale, then moved to Killian Road in Coventry Township and rebranded itself as Connect Church. The Word Church found itself unable to maintain the number of buildings in its portfolio, and many members were unwilling to relocate their place of worship, so the church vacated the church and listed the property for sale at $3.9 million. Prior to the sale, the Word Church had invested heavily into renovating the building. At the time of the listing, the campus consisted of seven buildings encompassing 363,000 square feet (33,700 m^{2}), including three separate sanctuaries and indoor and outdoor sports facilities on 29 acres (12 ha).

The building gained notoriety following the sale when it was heavily looted and vandalized. On February 26, 2024, Akron mayor Shammas Malik announced that the city planned to introduce legislation to fund the emergency demolition of the property due to "a serious public safety concern." Demolition of the campus commenced on March 19, 2024, with a budgeted cost of $1.24 million.

== Criticism ==
Akron Baptist Temple's structure has received some criticism, with the church being reproved for its focus on evangelism at the expense of educating its members and its fundamentalist doctrines. Billington claimed the church was intentionally structured to appeal to Appalachian people who had come to work in Akron's rubber industry.

== Pastors ==
Four clergymen have served as the head pastor of Akron Baptist Temple.

Name	Start	End
Dallas F. Billington	1935	1972
Charles F. Billington	1972	1996
Dallas R. Billington	1996	2007
Ed Holland	2007	2019
