= WINW =

Radio station in Canton, Ohio

- Canton, Ohio; United States
- Broadcast area: Canton metro area
- Frequency: 1520 kHz

Ownership
- Owner: Cap III Media, Inc.

History
- First air date: April 14, 1966
- Former call signs: WINW (1966–1989); WRQK (1989); WPGY (1989–1997); DWINW (2011)
- Call sign meaning: "Win-Wonderful"

Technical information
- Licensing authority: FCC
- Facility ID: 8549
- Class: D
- Power: 230 watts day 155 watts critical hours 3 watts night
- Transmitter coordinates: 40°49′24″N 81°25′43.5″W

Links
- Public license information: Public file; LMS

WINW (1520 AM) is a radio station licensed to Canton, Ohio, United States.

== History ==
WINW established a solid reputation as a Top 40 station in the 1960s and 1970s, using the slogan "WIN-Wonderful". Even as a daytime station with a highly directional 1,000-watt signal, it was successful in Canton for over a decade, sometimes approaching double digits in the ratings, despite its obvious signal limitations.

WINW had shared its frequency with WJMP located in nearby Kent, which made the Canton station difficult to hear in Northern Stark County. The station was originally built and run by Joseph Patterson "Patt" Wardlaw, Jr., who owned radio station KIST in Santa Barbara, California, and who had previously owned and operated WLEU in Erie, Pennsylvania. New AM Top 40 competition in the form of WQIO (Q-10), in late 1976, as well as the increasing popularity of FM radio stations, eventually brought an end to the glory years of "WIN-Wonderful".

WINW purchased FM station WHLQ (106.9 FM) from Susquehanna Radio Corporation in 1978, changing its call sign to WOOS-FM, and installed an automated Top 40 format there, while WINW changed to an adult standards format in 1981 and then went through a string of format and callsign changes for the next 15 years.

WINW evolved into an adult contemporary station by the mid-1980s, became an automated oldies station in 1987, changed to album rock WRQK on February 14, 1989, when it was coupled with WRQK-FM, changed back to WINW on August 16, 1989, then changed once again to WPGY on April 5, 1996 (by that time owned by Sabre Communications, which was "parking" the WPGY call letters for use on its new FM in Elmira, New York), and finally changed back to WINW on March 27, 1997.

The 1997 version of WINW was originally a contemporary Christian station, but leased an increasing amount of its air time to preachers while playing Urban Gospel music. Eventually the station decided to go full time with urban gospel.

After many years using studios near its transmitter site on Martindale Road, N.E., WINW moved into new studios at 237 West Tuscarawas Street in downtown Canton not long after the format change to Gospel. The "WIN-Wonderful" sign from the station's Top 40 heyday remained standing outside the Martindale studio building until the mid-1990s.

=== Transmitter vandalism ===
On September 23, 2010, WINW's transmitter site was heavily vandalized - the victim of copper theft during the station's off-hours in the nighttime. Due to that and severed tower support cables, WINW was forced off the air for an extended period. Pinebrook Corp. also realized that a 2004 license renewal was dismissed and the station no longer had authority to operate. It returned to the air with a temporary wire antenna, but would eventually fall silent again on February 23, 2011.

The Federal Communications Commission (FCC) deleted WINW's license from the records on March 3, 2011. However, on September 15, 2011, the FCC granted special temporary authority (STA), for WINW to resume operations, following a request by Pinebrook Corp., which claimed that repairs to the station's facilities were completed. The station returned to the air in December 2011.
