= WCCD =

Radio station in Painesville, Ohio

Simulcast of WABQ, Parma, Ohio
- Painesville, Ohio; United States
- Broadcast area: Lake County; Greater Cleveland (limited)
- Frequency: 1460 kHz
- Branding: Cleveland's Gospel

Programming
- Format: Urban contemporary gospel
- Affiliations: American Urban Radio Networks

Ownership
- Owner: Radio Advantage One, LLC
- Sister stations: WABQ

History
- First air date: April 25, 1956
- Former call signs: WPVL (1956–1984); WQLS (1984–1986); WBKC (1986–2006); WABQ (2006–2025)

Technical information
- Licensing authority: FCC
- Facility ID: 13685
- Class: B
- Power: 1,000 watts (daytime); 500 watts (nighttime)
- Transmitter coordinates: 41°44′20.2″N 81°14′8.4″W

Links
- Public license information: Public file; LMS

WCCD (1460 AM) is a non-commercial educational radio station licensed to Painesville, Ohio, carrying an urban contemporary gospel format. Owned by Radio Advantage One, LLC, WCCD serves Lake County and eastern parts of Greater Cleveland. WCCD's studios and transmitter are located on the northeastern end of Painesville.

== History ==
The station signed on the air on April 25, 1956, as WPVL (Where People Value Listening), a daytime only station. Somerset Broadcasting, Inc. was the owner under President/General Manager & Chief Engineer, Carl R. Lee. The station was originally located 102 S. Park Place in downtown Painesville, just a few steps from Carlisle-Allen Department Store and the Parmly Hotel. The original staff featured Elwood Thompson, who moved from WVSC, Somerset, Pennsylvania to be WPVL's first Program Director, James Ahlstrom was News and Sports Director and Tom Christen acted as the station's Farm Director. A couple of years later, the Sales Manager was Don Atkin, on-air personalities were, Jim Stephenson, Promotion Manager and on-air talent, Dick Gascoigne, and Bill Starkey, Sports Director.

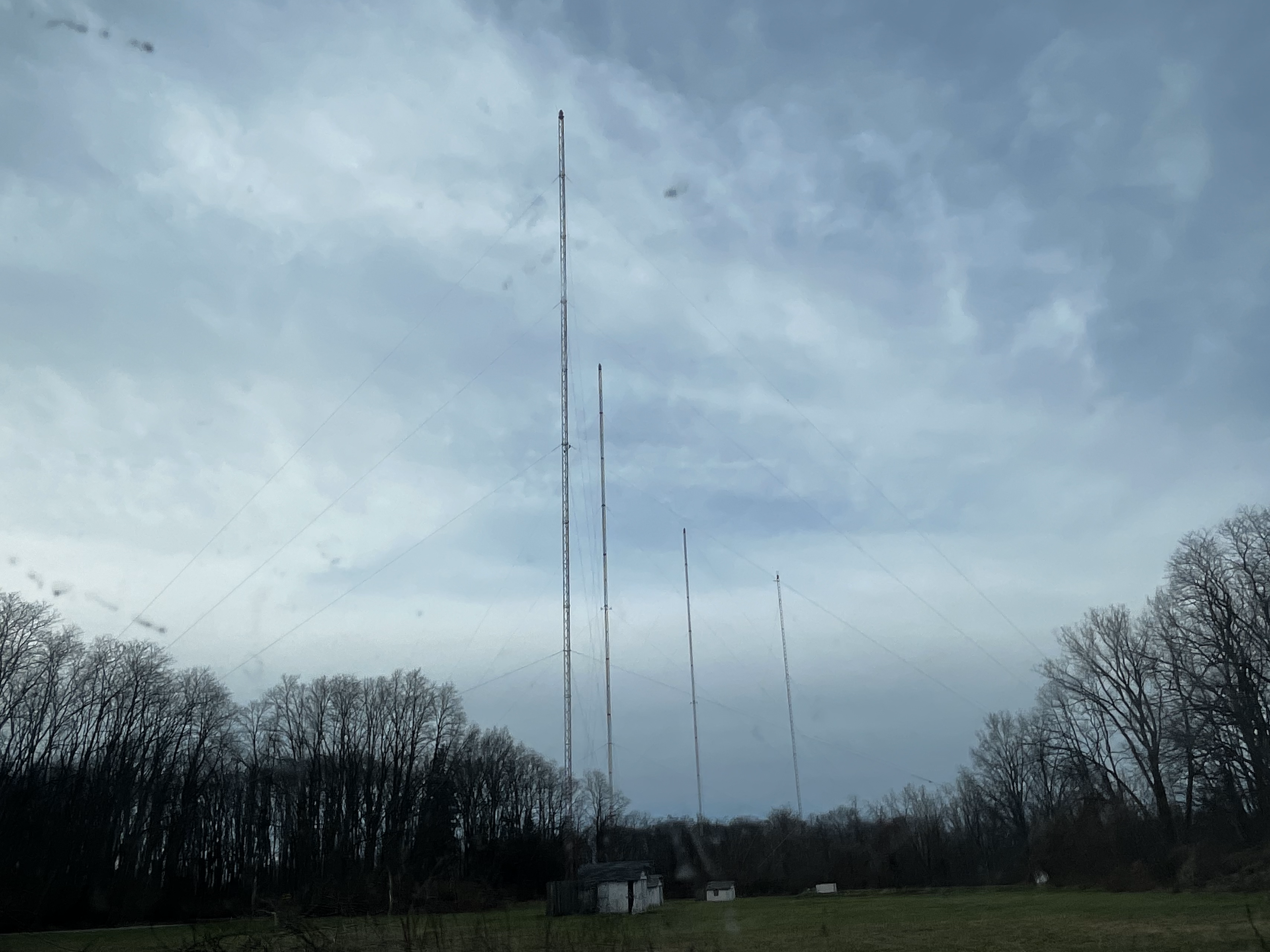
WCCD's transmitter site in Painesville.

In 1959, WPVL, Inc. built new studios in a new building at 713 Fobes Street which later was rechristened One Radio Place. The station is still located at this address. Carl R. Lee also was involved in the ownership and building of another AM daytime station, WDLR (1550 AM) in Delaware, Ohio.

It became WQLS on January 15, 1984. WQLS was acquired by Dale Broadcasting, then the owner of WBKC (1560 AM) in Chardon. It was purchased in late November 1985 for $750,000. WQLS's call letters were changed to WBKC on March 3, 1986. WBKC later had a full service, adult contemporary format, mixing music, news and sports.

In 2001, WBKC became a simulcast of classical station WCLV 104.9 FM in Cleveland. WBKC's simulcast was meant to help overcome some of WCLV's signal problems in the eastern portion of the Cleveland radio market, after that station's move to a weaker signal licensed to Lorain, west of Cleveland. WBKC was the Lake County affiliate for the Cleveland Indians, Cleveland Browns and Ohio State Buckeyes.

The station was sold to Dale Edwards, owner and operator of WABQ in Cleveland, in 2004. With the sale, Edwards operated WBKC under the "Radio Advantage One, LLC" banner, but maintained the simulcast of WCLV programming. In October 2006, Edwards sold WABQ's 1540 AM facility to Good Karma Broadcasting. Good Karma used 1540 to launch a sports radio station, WWGK.

With the sale of 1540 AM, WBKC 1460 dropped the classical WCLV simulcast. It switched to an urban gospel format that was previously on 1540. The station also discontinued coverage of Cleveland sports teams, choosing to focus all of its schedule (save mornings) on urban gospel music and Christian talk and teaching programs. They were aimed at the east side of Cleveland where many of the city's African-American population resided. WBKC swapped call signs with WABQ on October 24, 2006, and the WBKC call letters were then retired on November 7. The WABQ call sign was previously on 1540 AM when it was co-owned with 1460 AM.

On July 26, 2011, Cleveland Scene reported that WABQ would flip to a progressive talk format on August 1, 2011. The change came about due to a lease management agreement with veteran radio station executive Gary Richards, who at the time operated like-formatted station WVKO (1580 AM) in Columbus. The actual flip occurred on August 4, 2011.

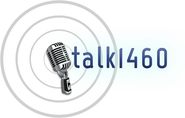
Logo as a progressive talk format

As part of the progressive talk format, WABQ became a local affiliate for The Stephanie Miller Show, The Ed Schultz Show, and The Mike Malloy Radio Show, as well as programs hosted by nationally syndicated personalities Thom Hartmann, Bill Press, Leslie Marshall. The station also began airing updates from NBC News Radio and MarketWatch.

Later, the lease agreement of WABQ by Gary Richards ended, and the station reverted to urban gospel music programming. WABQ remained an affiliate of the Cleveland Cavaliers Radio Network.

In July 2025, the station's owner acquired nearby radio station WCCD and exchanged callsigns with WABQ.
