= Mortenson Broadcasting =

Mortenson Broadcasting was an independent media company based in Lexington, Kentucky. Mortenson primarily owned Christian radio stations in several market areas.

== Stations formerly owned ==
=== Canton, Ohio ===
- WTOF - (under ownership of iHeartMedia) First Station owned by Mortenson

=== Akron, Ohio ===
- WHLO - (under ownership of iHeartMedia)

=== Dallas/Fort Worth, Texas ===
- KHVN - (under ownership of iHeartMedia)
- KTNO - (under ownership of Relevant Radio)
- KRVA - (under ownership of LRAD Media)
- KKGM - (under ownership of iHeartMedia)
- KGGR - (under ownership of MARC Radio Group)

=== Kansas City, Missouri ===
- KGGN - (under ownership of Catholic Radio Network, Inc.)

=== Huntington, West Virginia ===
- WEMM-FM - (under ownership of Bristol Broadcasting Company)
- WRWB - (under ownership of Bristol Broadcasting Company)

=== Lexington, Kentucky ===
- WJMM-FM - (under ownership of Christian Broadcasting System, LTD)
