= WGTE =

WGTE may refer to:

- WGTE-TV, a television station (channel 30 analog/29 digital) licensed to Toledo, Ohio, United States
- WGTE-FM, a radio station (91.3 FM) licensed to Toledo, Ohio, United States
