= Ideastream =

Operator of PBS and NPR stations in Cleveland, Ohio

- Trade name: Ideastream Public Media
- Industry: Mass media
- Predecessors: Educational Television Association of Metropolitan Cleveland; Cleveland Public Radio
- Founded: 2001
- Founders: Jerrold Wareham; Kit Jensen
- Headquarters: Cleveland, Ohio, United States
- Key people: Kevin E. Martin; (president/CEO); Jenny Northern; (general manager); Todd Mesek; (chief marketing officer)
- Services: Public radio and television broadcasting
- Website: ideastream.org

Ideastream (marketed as Ideastream Public Media) is the main public broadcaster in Cleveland, Ohio, United States, serving both Greater Cleveland and much of Northeast Ohio. Its headquarters, newsroom, and radio and television studios are located at the Idea Center in Playhouse Square in Downtown Cleveland. It operates WKSU (89.7 FM), the region's main radio news service aligned with NPR, jazz outlet WCSB (89.3 FM), classical music outlet WCLV (90.3 FM) and Cleveland PBS member station WVIZ (channel 25).

Ideastream was formed in July 2001 through a merger of equals between WVIZ and then-NPR member WCPN (since supplanted by WCLV), which up to that point operated separately as Educational Television Association of Metropolitan Cleveland and Cleveland Public Radio, respectively. Talks of a cooperative agreement between the two entities began in 1999, but was first proposed in 1993, when co-founder Jerrold Wareham was named as WVIZ's general manager. WCLV, then operating as a Lorain-licensed station at 104.9 FM, was donated to the group in 2011. Since 2021, Ideastream has operated WKSU and its repeater network on behalf of owner Kent State University, and has been Cleveland and Akron's sole NPR station of record since March 28, 2022. Kevin E. Martin has been the organization's president/CEO since January 9, 2017, succeeding Jerrold Wareham. Jenny Northern, a staffer with WCLV since 2001, was elevated to station manager in 2014 and became general manager for all stations in 2020. Since 2025, Ideastream has also operated WCSB, which is owned by Cleveland State University. Ideastream also operates the Statehouse News Bureau, a shared bureau for public media that covers Ohio state government.

All stations in the group jointly rebranded as Ideastream Public Media on June 15, 2021, to celebrate the entity's 20th anniversary.

== Radio ==
=== WKSU ===

WKSU was founded by Kent State University in 1950; Ideastream has operated the station since October 1, 2021, via a public service operating agreement with the university. Originally broadcasting solely to the campus population as a non-commercial educational station, WKSU has been an NPR news and information affiliate since 1973, and is the originating radio station for the City Club of Cleveland's Friday Forum. Licensed to Kent, Ohio, WKSU's signal is rebroadcast full-time over a network of five full-power repeaters and two low-power translators. With a combined 22-county coverage area and potential audience of 3.6 million people, WKSU and its repeater network boast the largest collective footprint for an FM radio station in Ohio. Since 2022, it has also served Lorain County and the western portion of Greater Cleveland via Lorain-licensed WCPN (104.9 FM).

The station and its full-power repeater network carry a roster of four HD Radio subchannels: a simulcast of WKSU's analog transmission, folk music via FolkAlley.com, a simulcast of WCLV and an alternate lineup of news and talk programs.

=== WCLV ===

The region's only full-time classical music and jazz outlet, WCLV was founded on November 1, 1962, as a commercial radio station at 95.5 FM. A complex asset and intellectual property swap on July 3, 2001, re-established WCLV on 104.9 FM as part of a long-term plan initiated by founding owners Robert Conrad and Rich Marschner to preserve the format from being subsumed by ownership consolidation in the radio industry. With station operations moved to the Idea Center in 2010, WCLV was donated to Ideastream in 2011 and converted to non-commercial status in 2013. WCLV has been the originating station for Cleveland Orchestra radio broadcasts since 1965 and for Weekend Radio since 1982.

WCLV's current 90.3 FM frequency was previously home to WCPN, one of Ideastream's two founding partners and, from 1984 to 2022, competed with WKSU as the region's other NPR member. It is also the successor station to WBOE, which the Cleveland Board of Education operated from 1938 to 1978, one of the first formally licensed non-commercial educational radio stations on the FM dial and one of the first FM stations in Ohio.

== Television ==

Ideastream's television service, WVIZ, was founded on February 7, 1965, as the 100th public television station in the United States. WVIZ at launch boasted the first female general manager of a major-market television station in the United States. Betty Cope, who played an active role in the station's formation and original focus towards educational television programming for school districts and telecourses for area colleges; WVIZ gradually adopted the conventional PBS Kids and PBS lineups starting in the early 1990s. Through WVIZ, Ideastream jointly operates and manages The Ohio Channel (which is carried on a WVIZ subchannel) and the Ohio Public Radio and Television Statehouse News Bureau.

On September 17, 2026, WNEO/WEAO (PBS Western Reserve) announced that it had agreed to merge into Ideastream; the consolidation is intended as a means to "[take] action now to protect something that matters deeply to the communities we serve" amid the loss of federal funding for public broadcasting and other associated challenges. PBS Western Reserve will take on the Ideastream Public Media branding, extending its regional footprint into Youngstown, Ohio and Western Pennsylvania. All staff will be retained, Ideastream's Kevin E. Martin will remain president of the combined entity, and PBS Western Reserve's Natalie Pillsbury will become chief content officer.
