= WCLV =

Classical music public radio station in Cleveland

- Cleveland, Ohio; United States
- Broadcast area: Greater Cleveland
- Frequency: 90.3 MHz (HD Radio)
- Branding: WCLV Ideastream Public Media

Programming
- Language: English
- Format: Classical music
- Subchannels: HD2: Jazz (WCSB); HD3: Public radio/talk (WKSU)
- Affiliations: BBC World Service; American Public Media

Ownership
- Owner: Ideastream
- Sister stations: WCPN; WCSB; WKSU; WVIZ

History
- Founded: November 21, 1938 (Note: WCLV does not formally recognize the history of WBOE as part of its own and considers September 8, 1984, as their sign-on date. However, other resources, including Case Western Reserve University's Encyclopedia of Cleveland History, combine the histories of the two stations and regard WCLV as a direct successor. WCLV has also recognized November 1, 1962, as their start date, when what is now WKLV-FM changed calls from WDGO to WCLV.)
- First air date: September 8, 1984
- Former call signs: WBOE (1938–1982); WCPN (1983–2022)
- Former frequencies: 41.5 MHz (1938–1941); 42.5 MHz (1941–1947); 44.3 MHz (1947–1948)
- Call sign meaning: "Cleveland"

Technical information
- Licensing authority: FCC
- Facility ID: 12025
- Class: B
- ERP: 47,000 watts
- HAAT: 155 meters (509 ft)
- Transmitter coordinates: 41°22′18.00″N 81°42′48.00″W

Links
- Public license information: Public file; LMS
- Webcast: Listen live; Listen live (via TuneIn)
- Website: ideastream.org/classical

WCLV (90.3 FM) is a non-commercial educational radio station licensed to Cleveland, Ohio, United States, carrying a fine art and classical music format. Owned by Ideastream Public Media, the station serves both Greater Cleveland and Northeast Ohio as the home station for the Cleveland Orchestra and an affiliate of the BBC World Service.

This station traditionally has dated its start to September 8, 1984, when regular operations began under its current broadcast license. However, other accounts trace its history to the station it supplanted, WBOE. Under the auspices of the Cleveland Board of Education, WBOE signed on in 1938 as the first formally recognized educational radio station in the United States on the Apex band. In 1941, the station converted to the FM band, becoming not only the first educational FM station, but also the first licensed FM station in Cleveland and one of the first FM stations in Ohio. Featuring in-school instructional programming throughout the majority of its existence, WBOE joined National Public Radio (NPR) in 1977 but shut down the following year due to extreme fiscal distress within the Cleveland Public Schools; this resulted in the absence of public radio in Cleveland proper until successor station WCPN's launch in 1984. Originally one of two NPR member stations in the Northeast Ohio region alongside Kent–licensed WKSU, this station assumed the format and calls of WCLV from 104.9 FM on March 28, 2022, following a programming merger between WCPN and WKSU.

WCLV's studios are currently located at the Idea Center within Playhouse Square on Euclid Avenue in Downtown Cleveland with the station's transmitter sited in Parma, Ohio. In addition to a standard analog transmission, WCLV broadcasts over three HD Radio channels, is simulcast over the third HD sub-channel of WKSU and its repeater network, relayed over WVIZ's 25.8 audio-only sub-channel, and is available online.

== WBOE (1938–1978) ==
=== AM Apex establishment ===
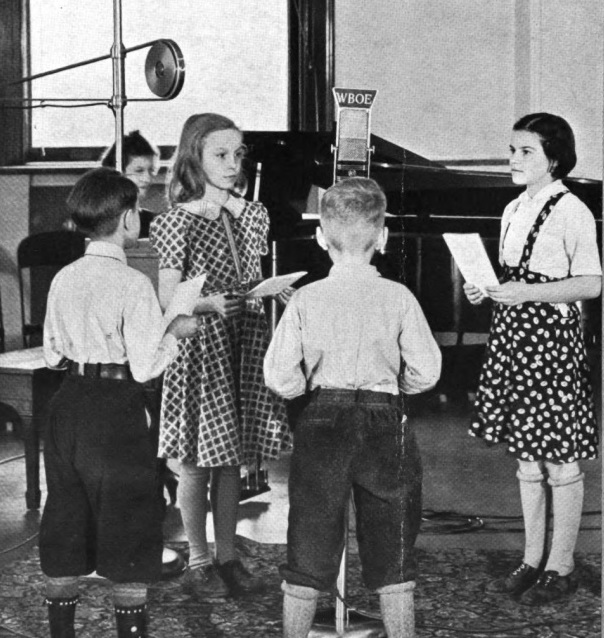
Early student-produced broadcast over WBOE, c. 1939.

Organized radio broadcasting was introduced in the United States in the early 1920s, and by the mid-1930s, the standard amplitude modulation (AM) broadcast band was considered to be too full to allow any meaningful increase in the number of stations. Looking to expand the number of available frequencies, the Federal Communications Commission (FCC) began to issue licenses to parties interested in testing the suitability of using higher transmitting frequencies between roughly 25 and 44 MHz. These stations were informally known as "Apex" stations, due to the tall height of their transmitter antennas, which were needed because coverage was primarily limited to local line-of-sight distances. These original Apex stations operated under experimental licenses, and like standard broadcasting stations, used AM transmissions.

Meanwhile, the Cleveland Public School system in Cleveland, Ohio, had shown interest in utilizing radio broadcasts as an instructional aide as early as 1925, broadcasting a music appreciation class over WTAM twice each week. Contracting with WHK in 1929, the school system purchased 15-minute blocks of airtime at reduced rates, focusing on specific subjects like arithmetic, music and geography; two Cleveland schools were selected for this experiment, with their existing public address system connected to WHK's signal. By February 1932, the district moved their broadcasts back to WTAM, now NBC-owned, which offered them a daily block of airtime. During the WTAM partnership, the school programs became more sophisticated, including a 43-part series on literacy, geared towards specific age groups from elementary to high school. It would be a grant from the Rockefeller Foundation's General Education Board in 1937, coupled with the demands of accommodating commercial radio, that prompted the school system to enter broadcasting.

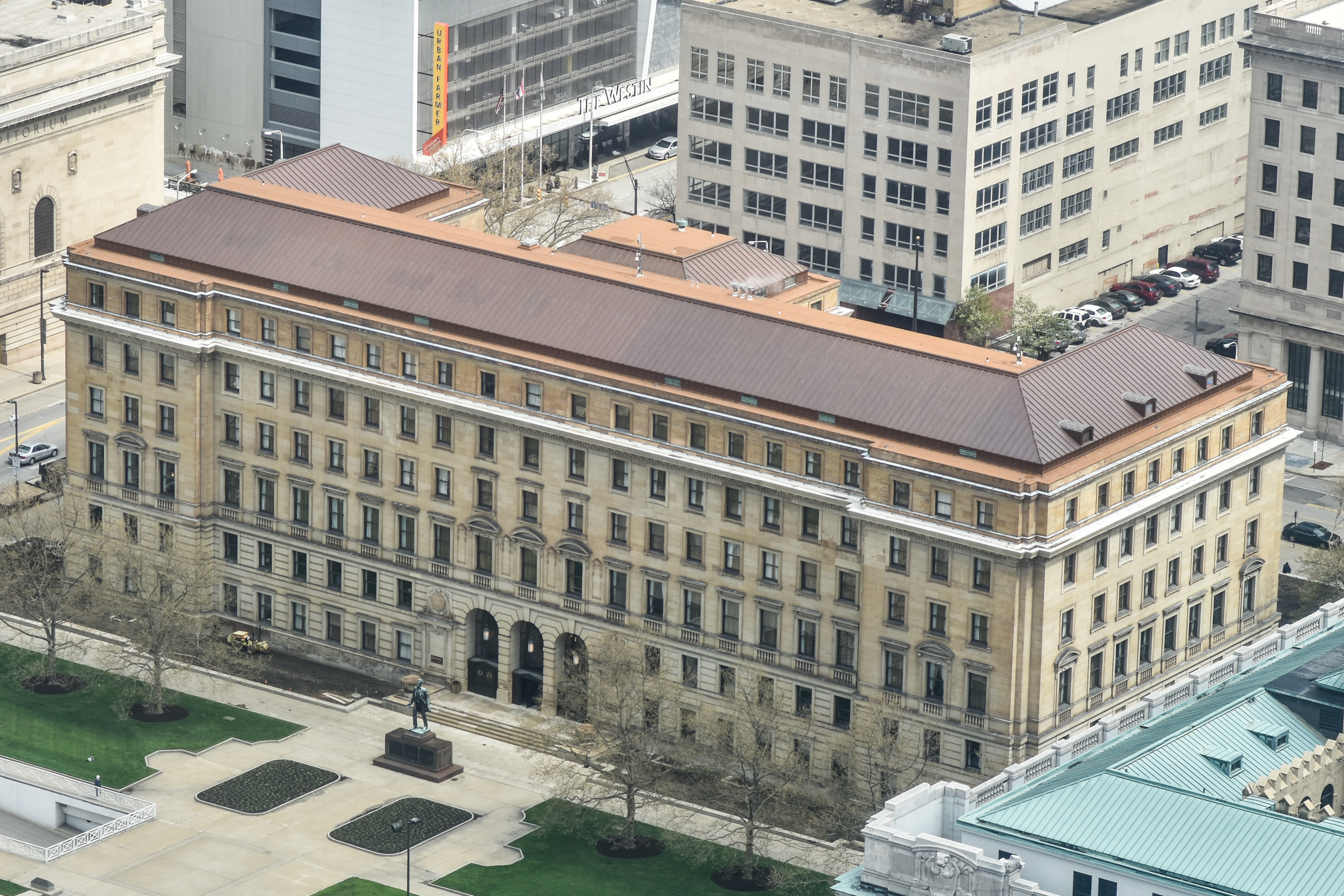
WBOE's studios were originally located on the sixth floor of the Cleveland Board of Education Building (now the Drury Plaza Hotel).

On July 22, 1937, the Cleveland Board of Education filed paperwork to establish an experimental radio station on 26.4 MHz but the FCC reallocated the Apex frequencies after discovering ionospheric strengthening from high solar activity resulted in strong and undesirable skywave, with two existing stations being heard as far away as Australia. Announced in October 1937, the new allocations resulted in a dedicated band for Apex stations consisting of 75 channels with 40 kHz separations, and spanning from 41.02–43.98 MHz. In addition, the band's first 25 channels, from 41.02–41.98 MHz, were reserved in January 1938 for non-commercial educational stations. (Note: Although there had been stations operated by educational institutions on the standard AM band since the early 1920s, including Ohio State University's WOSU, those stations were not under a separate license classification up to this point.) The school board's application was accordingly modified on January 31, 1938, from an experimental station to an educational station at 41.5 MHz with 500 watts. Assigned the WBOE call sign, the station became fully licensed on November 21, 1938, as the first authorized educational broadcasting station with facilities and transmitter located at Lafayette School on Abell Avenue. 150 custom-built crystal radio sets were purchased by the district and distributed to all the schools, tuned to pick up WBOE and the respective school's public address system. Because conventional radio sets could not pick up the Apex band, WBOE did not have any discernable audience otherwise; as educator Paul C. Reed summarized the station, "WBOE, as originally set up, could reach its schools but could not reach an adult audience at home."

At launch, WBOE only operated on school days for seven hours from 8:30 a.m. to 4:30 p.m. with instructional material for students from kindergarten to high school. Because of the prior arrangements on WTAM and WHK, several divisions in the school district already boasted as much as eight years of broadcasting experience. Studios were constructed on the sixth floor of the Board of Education building in Downtown Cleveland, which radio supervisor William B. Levenson boasted as "one of the finest in the country". All but one of the high schools in the district launched radio workshops that originated educational programming for WBOE in a method likened to affiliate stations contributing to a radio network. In the spring of 1939, WBOE experimented with facsimile transmissions sent outside of regular programming hours for distributing printed materials such as lesson instructions, announcements and maps; this was demonstrated during the American Association of School Administrators' annual conference held in Cleveland.

=== Conversion to FM ===
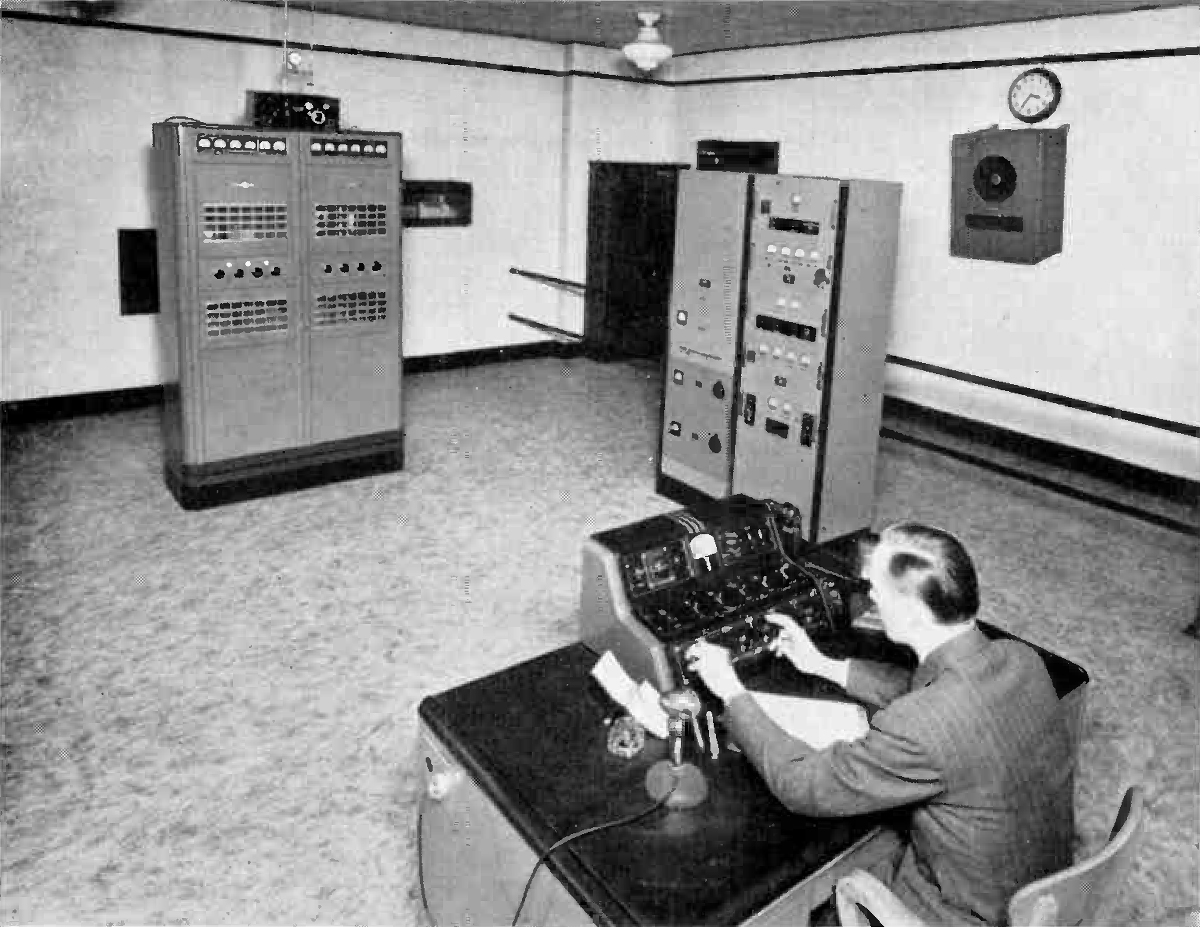
WBOE's transmitter room at Lafayette School, c. 1941, with an FM exciter (right) donated by Major Edwin Howard Armstrong, the inventor of FM

At the same time the 41–44 MHz Apex band was established, the FCC noted that research would begin on the technical requirements of frequency modulation as a possible alternative to the ultra high frequency broadcasts that Apex utilitzed. FM experimentations soon revealed significant advantages to Apex, especially with sound quality and resistance to interference from static, including from lightning. The reassigned Apex band was also still prone to extreme skywave propagation, with WBOE receiving reception reports throughout the western and southwestern U.S. and as far as England. In May 1940, the FCC decided to authorize an FM broadcast band, effective January 1, 1941, operating on 40 channels spanning 42–50 MHz, with the first five channels reserved for educational stations. Apex stations were subsequently informed by the Commission that they needed to either go silent or convert to FM transmission, effectively eliminating the Apex band. WBOE was one of only three educational Apex stations to have ever signed on, the other two being WNYE in New York City and WBKY in Beattyville, Kentucky.

WBOE applied on August 5, 1940, to change to FM operation with 1,000 watts on 42.5 MHz and new FM radio receivers were purchased for placement in the participating schools. A transmitter and FM exciter were donated to the station by FM's inventor, Major Edwin Howard Armstrong, who was impressed with the station's educational work during a tour of their facilities. On February 3, 1941, WBOE achieved several firsts: it became the first licensed non-commercial educational station on FM in the United States, the first licensed FM station in Cleveland and one of the first in the state of Ohio, (Note: When WBOE's conversion took place, only about a dozen FM stations were on the air in the entire country, most of them experimental stations. W45CM in Columbus, Ohio, which was founded as experimental FM station W8XVH, became the first licensed commercial FM station in the state later in the year.) still maintaining a schedule from 8:30 a.m. to 4:30 p.m. on school days. The National Association of Educational Broadcasters (NAEB) expressed hope WBOE's FM conversion and the coming availability of FM sets entering the marketplace could help the station find listeners outside of the classroom, a sentiment shared by U.S. Commissioner of Education John W. Studebaker, who lobbied for the 42–44 MHz non-commercial allotment.

Judging by the interest of educators in the operation of the Cleveland School Station WBOE, it is quite probable that there will be a steady, if not rapid, growth of such FM transmitters throughout the country.

— William B. Levenson, supervisor of radio activities, Cleveland Board of Education

Four years later, the FCC announced that, due to interference concerns, it was reallocating the current FM "low band" frequencies to other services, and existing FM band stations would be relocated to 88–106 MHz (later expanded to 108 MHz). Once again this meant that the transmitter had to be replaced, and the school radios upgraded for reception on the new band. In July 1946, the FCC directed that FM stations currently operating on 42–44 MHz would have to move to new frequencies by the end of the year, and WBOE was reassigned to 44.3 MHz. WBOE's initial assignment on the new FM "high" band was for 90.1 MHz, however a subsequent reallocation in the fall of 1947 moved the station to 90.3 MHz. During a transition period, the FCC allowed stations to simultaneously broadcast on both their old and new assignments, and in July 1948 the Board of Education requested permission to remain on 44.5 MHz "for as long as possible", and from September 1 to the end of the year WBOE was permitted to broadcast on both frequencies. On January 1, 1949, WBOE began broadcast solely on 90.3 MHz, increasing its transmitter power to 3,000 watts and an effective radiated power (ERP) of 10,000 watts; a power upgrade to 5,000 watts and an ERP of 15,000 watts took place on December 9, 1959.

=== "America's Pioneer School Station" ===
No other school system in the country, as yet, has carried the experiment of direct teaching by radio quite so far. For example, a history broadcast for elementary classes may be scheduled. Classroom teachers have tuned in at the proper hour and from the loudspeaker their pupils might hear: "Good morning, children. In my visit with you, today, I shall talk about the three-cornered trade route which was so important to our country's early development." The clear, distinct voice of a teacher, carefully selected for her radio personality, for her success as a classroom teacher, and for her ability to sense the reaction of the unseen hundreds she now instructs, is speaking.

— Marie M. Powell, for Every Week Magazine

From its 1938 sign on and in the 39 years that followed, WBOE operated as an adjunct of the Cleveland Public Schools, with broadcasts limited to school days and going dark during weekends, holidays and summer vacations. Additional "preview" programming was sometimes transmitted for teachers during after-school hours, introducing any forthcoming series and to familiarize themselves with course material and the presenters. By 1949, the school system employed eleven scriptwriters on a full-time basis, more than any of the 12 commercial radio stations in the city. Programs often had periods of silent intervals in order for teachers to present supplemental materials, (Note: One of the reasons the Cleveland Public Schools entered radio broadcasting via WBOE was the resistance by commercial radio of such silent intervals during their programs, noting that "there is a basic distinction between educational and commercial broadcasting.) and some programs incorporated the use of lantern slides in the classroom as a visual component.

Saul Carson, writing for The New Republic, called WBOE "a model for the country" and "the most exciting broadcasting job being done". Contemporary historian Carroll Atkinson, Ph.D. regarded the Cleveland schools as the "strongest exponent of the 'master teacher' ideal in the value of radio instruction" while William B. Levenson called WBOE "America's Pioneer School Station". The station would soon have an international influence when Levenson was a featured speaker at a March 1946 conference for the Canadian National Advisory Council on School Broadcasting, with Canadian Broadcasting Corporation executives in attendance. The "Cleveland Plan" became a sobriquet to describe WBOE as a model for educational radio, but station director Edwin F. Helman downplayed this in 1949, writing, "we have the natural feeling that there is nothing different about our aims or programming—only the differences... from being a local and not a regional station." Edward L. Hoon of the Ohio Education Association cited WBOE as a way to effectively reach students who were sick, hospitalized or unable to physically attend classes.

Radio Station WBOE — Second Semester (1948) Program Guide

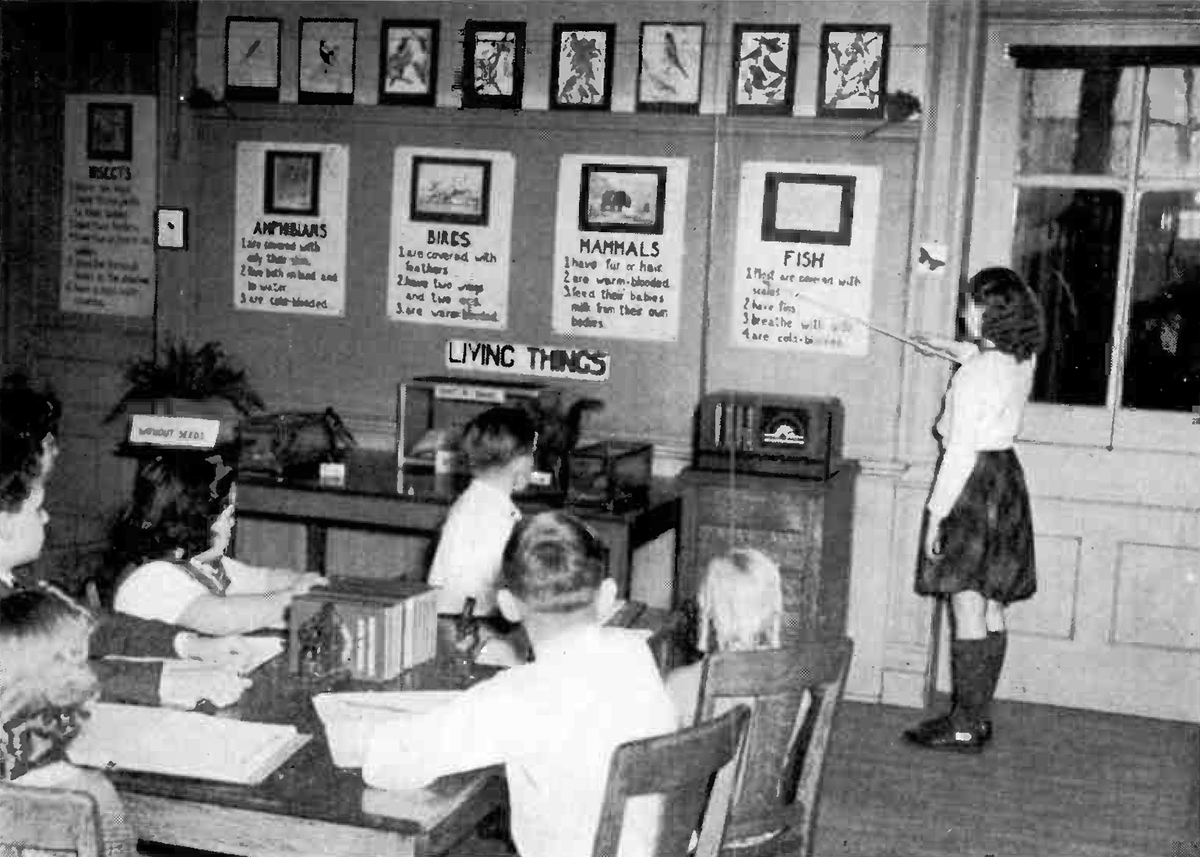
Cleveland elementary school classroom c. 1941 that employed visual aides while the FM receiver plays an instructional program via WBOE.

Even as WBOE was a non-commercial station, the Cleveland Public Schools made special arrangements with WTAM, WHK, WGAR, WCLE and WJW (Note: Licensed to Akron, Ohio, when WBOE signed on, WJW moved to Cleveland in 1943. Likewise, WCLE moved from Cleveland to Akron in 1945.) to provide access to educational sustaining programs from the four major radio networks: NBC, Blue/ABC, CBS and Mutual. All stations supplied private lines to WBOE's studios for the purpose of either directly broadcasting sustaining programs to a classroom (Note: Sustaining programs were usually presented on commercial radio networks with no in-program advertisements.) or to record them for future rebroadcast, sometimes with added narration. Provided daily listings from all four networks, WBOE had the ability to broadcast live speeches or addresses from world leaders if any network carried it. Newscasts from all four networks were also rebroadcast, along with locally originated programs from the stations if they were of educational interest. Sustaining programs relayed over WBOE during the 1939–1940 school year included Mutual's Intercollegiate Debates, NBC's Gallant American Women and Between the Bookends, and CBS's Young People's Concerts. This arrangement was briefly imperiled in November 1945 when American Federation of Musicians president James Petrillo directed networks to ban the duplication of programs containing music on FM stations, preventing WBOE from accessing CBS's The American School of the Air via WGAR; the AFM relaxed the ban for WBOE a few weeks later. WBOE also rebroadcast installments of The Ohio Story, a regionally syndicated anthology series WTAM originated by arrangement of Ohio Bell with all commercials excised.

As radio networks phased out sustaining programming, WBOE began carrying shows through the NAEB Tape Network, which functioned through mail order reel-to-reel tapes instead of dedicated phone lines. WNYE had already been supplying recordings of their weekly Assignment: U.N. to WBOE, which was utilized for high school students. By 1954, WBOE was one of approximately 90 stations that participated in the service, and one of nine in the state. WBOE occasionally did broadcast outside of the school day: for a two-week period in January 1954, WBOE experimented with a five-hour evening program block aimed at adults; such fare already aired over WBOE during semester breaks. When WERE-FM (98.5) suspended broadcasting as part of an antenna upgrade, WBOE broadcast that station's evening programming commercial-free from late January 1958 until March 1958, with WERE-FM management sending a "sincere thank you" in return. WBOE and WERE-FM also collaborated for an experimental stereophonic sound broadcast over two Sunday nights in April 1959. Starting in 1960 and running through 1967, the station aired Healthlines, a weekly series aimed at physicians by the Academy of Medicine of Cleveland & Northeast Ohio that WGAR originated. The NAEB Tape Network was reorganized into the National Educational Radio Network in 1963, then sold to National Public Radio (NPR) as part of that network's 1971 launch; the tape network affiliates (including WBOE) did not join NPR proper despite the changes, a distinction NPR emphasized.

=== Competition from television ===
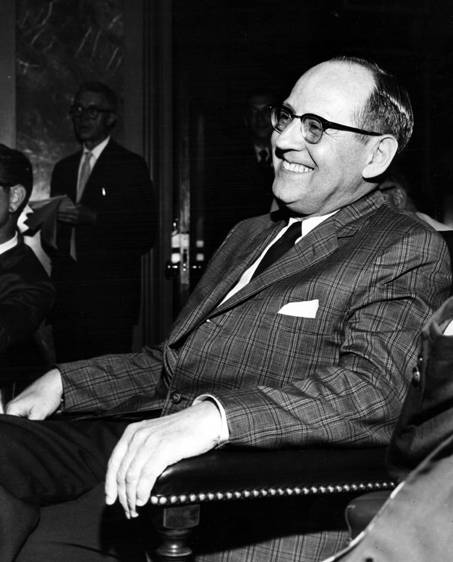
Dr. William B. Levenson

The Cleveland school's emphasis on visual aides, including instructors and recorded music, to accentuate programs over WBOE led Variety to describe the radio station in their March 8, 1944, issue as "a close facsimile to actual television", suggesting that WBOE could be a forerunner to educational television. During a keynote speech at the NAEB's 1953 Lincoln Lodge Seminar, Levenson reflected on WBOE's effectiveness as a learning tool, seeing television as a step forward and a way for students to learn by being emotionally involved in the course material. Levenson also noted that television courses need to be presented not as supplementary to a course, but intrinsic to it, a process that had been successful at WBOE. While many teachers in the district were initially reluctant to work with the medium, a full generation of teachers had "grown up with radio" and thus saw the value and potential of mass media. Earlier in 1953, the Board of Education set aside $200,000 (equivalent to $2.41 million in 2025) for possible investment into a television station, committing to investigate the necessary costs.

It would not be until 1961 that area civic leaders, including Cleveland mayor Anthony J. Celebrezze, agreed to a plan financing the construction of six educational UHF stations throughout Northeast Ohio, including one in Cleveland. Similar to radio 30 years earlier, the Cleveland schools forged arrangements with the city's three existing television stations—KYW-TV, WEWS-TV and WJW-TV—at the end of 1961, with each station providing a daily 15-minute block to air shows developed by WBOE staff; the schools were also furnished with up to $30,000 (equivalent to $323,218 in 2025) worth of television sets. Levenson had been elevated to Cleveland schools superintendent earlier in 1961 and held the position until resigning in 1964 amid demands to implement desegregation busing with three predominantly white schools, but declined to cite that as the reason for his resignation.

WVIZ signed on as Cleveland's educational television outlet on February 7, 1965, owned by a consortium and based out of Max S. Hayes High School. Like WBOE, WVIZ strictly carried in-school instructional fare during the school day and was aligned with school districts throughout the area. Even with the competition from television, WBOE continued with educational fare. Southern Illinois University professor Richard Swerdlin considered educational radio in 1967 to be an inexpensive and overlooked alternative to television, citing WBOE as one of several "outstanding" stations in the field. In 1963, Leetonia High School in Leetonia, Ohio, began playing programs taped from both WBOE and Kent State University's WKSU-FM, showing tangible results among the student body. One 1964 series directed toward junior high students centered around communism and life in Soviet Russia in both an economic and historical context. One of the station's highest-profile moments came when two students from Glenville and South High, respectively, interviewed Louis Stokes after his 1968 election to the U.S. House, which WBOE later broadcast.

Ultimately, educational radio had a mixed legacy: even with WBOE's relative success, the concept failed to materialize on a national level. School districts that did not operate stations often did not have radio sets in their schools, while those that did either had issues with picking up stations, coordinating their classes with programs offered, or finding said programs to vary significantly in quality; Catholic University of America professor Josh Sheppard would later explain, "if you talk to old practitioners in public broadcasting, they actually use 'educational radio' as a pejorative." Levenson's hope in 1941 of "a steady, if not rapid growth" in FM educational stations throughout the U.S. largely occurred by the early 1950s, but the FM band itself remained obscure overall; by 1958, WBOE was the only Cleveland FM station in operation that also had full coverage in neighboring Akron. Existing educational stations eventually moved away from in-school programming and focused on educational fare for a general audience, seen as a developmental influence for public radio in the present day.

=== Public radio involvement ===
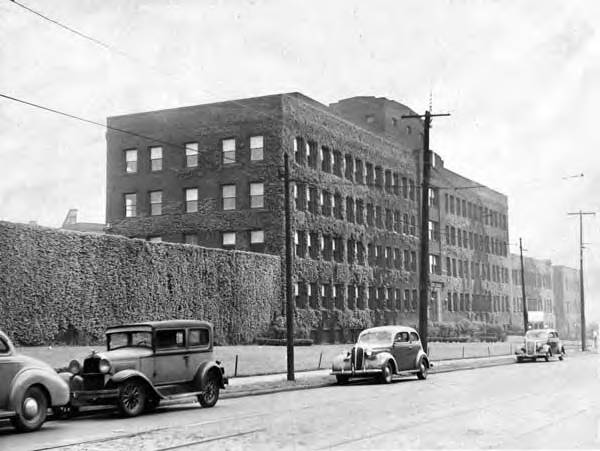
This industrial building on Quincy Avenue in Cleveland's east side (pictured in 1944) was later owned by the Cleveland Public Schools and housed WBOE from 1974 to 1978.

Owing to educational radio's effectiveness being reduced by television, work slowly began in the early 1970s to revamp WBOE. The June 28, 1973, Cleveland Board of Education meeting authorized contracts to move WBOE's studios from the Board of Education Building to the Woodhill-Quincy Administration building on the city's east side originally built for the National Castings Company in 1921. The studio move was completed on December 16, 1974; additionally, the station's transmitter was moved from Lafayette School to a new tower in Parma, Ohio, along with a power upgrade to 50,000 watts. A multimedia slideshow prepared by WBOE in early January 1975 touted the station's planned conversion into a public radio outlet and planned link with NPR but progress was slowed by both technical matters and a lack of willingness by school board officials to follow through. WBOE continued to operate solely from 8:00 a.m. to 4:30 p.m. on school days featuring in-school programming, with light entertainment, public service or classical music selections to conclude the broadcast day. The delays also impacted the launch of the Cleveland Radio Reading Service (CRRS): originally intending to broadcast over a 67 kHz Subsidiary Communications Authorization (SCA) subchannel of WBOE, the CRRS had to contract with WXEN until WBOE's SCA subchannel was activated in July 1977.

Cleveland lawyer William Bradford "Brad" Norris founded Cleveland Public Radio (CPR) in 1976 with the intent to finally bring NPR programming to Cleveland, which at the time was the largest U.S. city without a local fulltime NPR station, a situation the Corporation for Public Broadcasting (CPB) was also reportedly embarrassed by. Norris garnered attention acting as Cleveland's pro bono legal counsel during the city's antitrust litigation against Cleveland Electric Illuminating (CEI) and envisioned WBOE becoming a radio equivalent to WVIZ. Norris' initial proposal to the Board of Education had CPR assume control of WBOE and convert it to a public radio outlet with all in-school programming moved to a second SCA subchannel, but the board was not interested. At the end of December 1976, WBOE added NPR's flagship program All Things Considered to the lineup, extending the broadcast day to 6:30 p.m; as 1977 started, WBOE operated for 18 hours daily, officially as an NPR member. WBOE's NPR addition was regarded as "half-hearted, poorly conceived and badly funded" as the station continued airing in-school educational programming during the weekday, did not set up a local news department or conduct pledge drives. With CPR unable to file for a non-commercial license of their own due to the Cleveland market being saturated with FM signals and the acquisition of a commercial license being cost-prohibitive, Norris again approached the Board of Education with the offer, along with endorsements from multiple Cleveland city councilmen and area community organizations, but were rejected.

Production of in-school materials continued under coordinator Charles Siegel, with shows like Living today: Survival, It's your decision! and The Plain Dealer Green Thumb Club among the offerings. Students in Glenville High's telecommunications program produced Music Connection, a weekly show on music appreciation centered around rock and roll and R&B that ran on WBOE over the summer of 1977. Several announcers joined the station as a result of the programming expansion, including onetime WJMO announcer Karl Johnson, who had already been working for the school district as public relations director. British classical pianist Clive Lythgoe, who already had a nationally distributed television program originating from WVIZ, hosted similar radio shows over both WBOE and WCLV (95.5 FM). John Basalla, involved with Baldwin Wallace College's radio station WBWC since 1972, began working at WBOE as a part-timer in 1976 and also began archiving recordings and transcriptions used by the station throughout its history, many of which came from 16-inch electrical transcription discs, which he has continued to the present day.

Ethnic shows, traditionally a staple of commercial station WZAK, (Note: WXEN also broadcast ethnic programming on a full-time basis until a format change the previous year; WZAK also dropped such programming outright in 1981.) were added to the Saturday lineup, with WBOE joining WOSU, KQED-FM and WUSF among non-commercial educational stations that also broadcast ethnic fare. WBOE was one of several stations in the area that picked up NPR's Jazz Alive! along with featuring jazz in assorted hours. Jay Robert Klein, involved with the school district since the end of World War II, became WBOE's final station manager in 1974 while junior high school programmer Tom Altenbernd was with WBOE from 1952 until retiring in 1977. WBOE's visibility in the market remained imperceptible, however, failing to attract more than one percent of listeners in area Arbitron ratings.

=== Financial calamity and suspension of operations ===
We're broke. You want any simpler than that?

— Paul Briggs, Cleveland Municipal School District superintendent

While WBOE started to evolve into a public radio station, the Cleveland school district entered a cataclysmic period. The NAACP's Cleveland branch sued the district in what became Reed vs. Rhodes on December 12, 1973, alleging the fostering of segregation and demanded the institution of desegregation busing. Arnold R. Pinkney, the school board's Black president, expressed worry that the lawsuit would heighten racial tensions in the city; (Note: For further context, see Glenville shootout and Hough riots.) the district later claimed fears of white flight precluded them from implementing a plan of their own volition. Presiding over the case, U.S. District Judge Frank J. Battisti ruled on August 31, 1976, that both the local and state boards of education were guilty of deliberately inducing segregation practices, issuing the first of what would become 4,000 court orders over the next six years. The school board was mandated to institute a busing plan, but needed to raise money to fund it; a mill levy referendum failed on April 6, 1978, by a 2–1 margin almost entirely on racial lines, putting the district in debt of $30 million (equivalent to $148 million in 2025) and threatening an outright closure of the district. Faculty, which had not been paid for nearly a month, appealed to the Ohio Supreme Court after the levy failure for the schools to close so they could file for unemployment benefits. Battisti, who sought to keep the schools operational, twice found the school board in contempt of court for failing to comply with his orders but agreed to delay the busing plan until 1979.

As the school year began on September 12, 1978, Cleveland's teachers union went on strike, closing all school buildings and preventing in-school instructional programming from resuming over WBOE. The Ohio Board of Education provided a financial bailout plan that included a provision for the school board to suspend all operations at WBOE and sell off the station. The teachers union defied a back-to-work court order by Judge Harry A. Hanna on October 5, 1978, while the station's $280,000 annual budget (equivalent to $1.38 million in 2025) made the station expendable. WBOE ended regular programming at midnight on October 7, with station manager Jay Robert Klein and Cleveland journalist Dick Feagler providing a pre-recorded eulogy; in his syndicated newspaper column, Feagler wrote, "cause of death—a stroke of the pen". The school board retained former NPR president Lee Frischknecht to help find ways to keep WBOE functional; Frischknecht made inquiries to both CPR and WVIZ as potential interim operators and continued to study options when the station was ordered closed.

Further musing over WBOE's demise, Feagler wrote:

...despite what you may have read in the newspaper, there are no firm plans afoot right now to save (WBOE). But then, when you come right down to it, we are rotten at saving worthwhile things, aren't we? Wouldn't you agree with that? We are much better at destruction than we are at preservation, doesn't it seem that way to you? This is the land of Noah Webster and we haven't learned the difference between progress and destruction. All we have to do is look it up. But I'm getting bitter and there is no place in an obit for bitterness. By the time you write the obit, bitterness is a day late and a dollar short. And I want to keep this an obit. So I'll end it the way they taught me to end obits. WBOE is dead. Friends may call, but it really won't do much good. Memorial services will be held in the memories of all of us who once were Cleveland school children. Interment? Interment will be in the muck of the present.

== Cleveland's public radio vacancy (1978–1984) ==
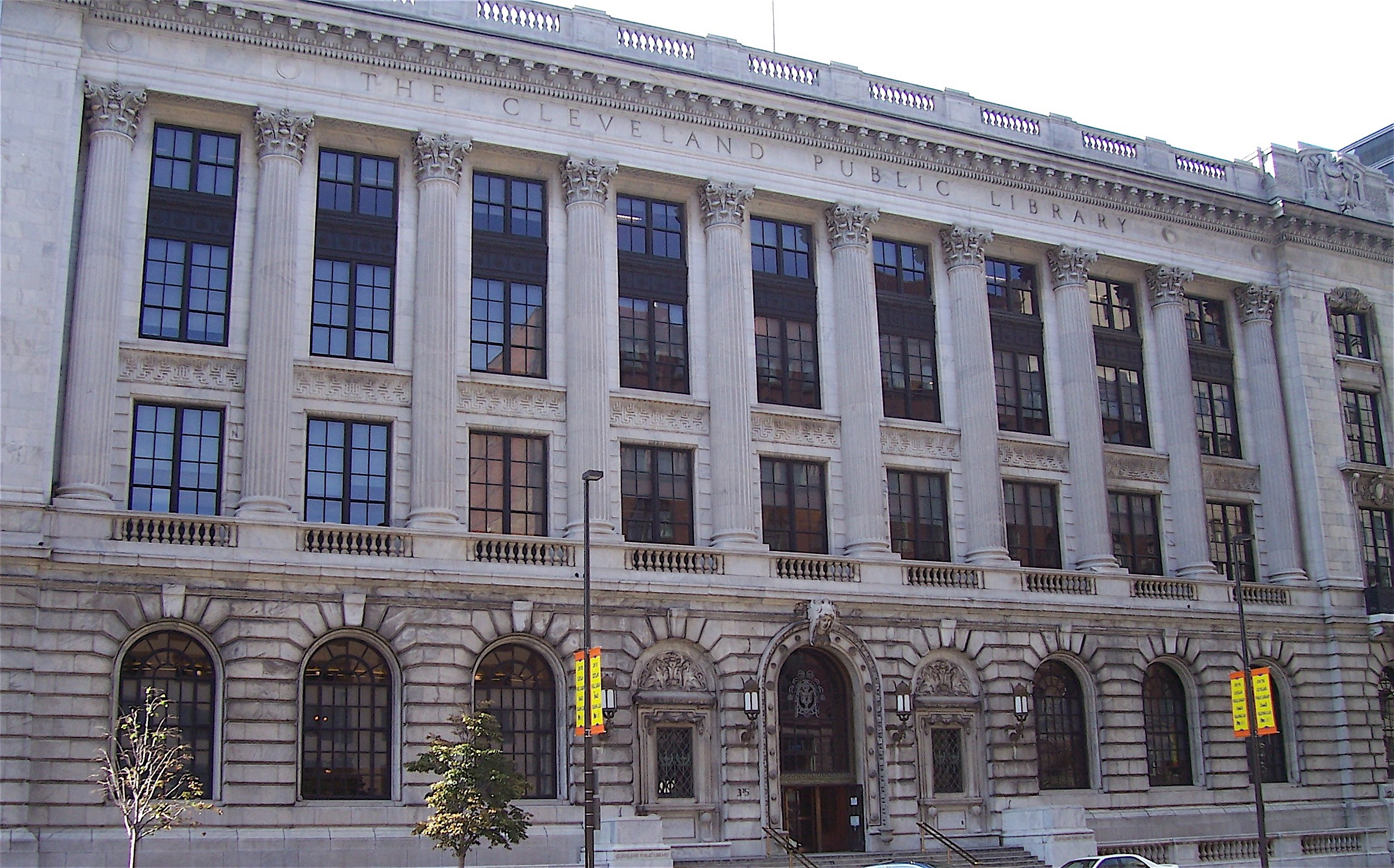
The Cleveland Public Library initially won a 1979 auction for WBOE's license, then competed with Cleveland Public Radio for the succeeding license.

WBOE's suspension resulted in the Greater Cleveland radio market earning the dubious distinction as being the largest market in the United States, and the only major-market city, without a designated public radio outlet. In WBOE's absence, WKSU-FM, which carried NPR programming starting in 1973, (Note: See WKSU § Joining NPR.) became the de facto sole NPR member station in northeast Ohio. Despite this, the FCC mandated WKSU's signal had to be directional aimed away from Cleveland to protect WBOE as both were third-adjacent signals; this resulted in WKSU having coverage issues throughout Cuyahoga County. WBOE's carrier signal was still active and continued broadcasting the CRRS over their SCA subchannel but continuous dead air over conventional FM receivers; the reading service paid WBOE $73,000 annually to keep two engineers employed, thus WBOE never filed an STA request to remain off-air. The CRRS broadcasts were suspended due to a lack of funding on May 1, 1982, with WBOE going silent completely.

Lee C. Howley, Jr., board president of the Cleveland Public Library (CPL), revealed at the end of 1978 that the system had been negotiating with the school board over the past several months to buy WBOE, prompting WVIZ to withdraw their interest in the station. A library operating a radio station was not without precedent, as WPLN-FM in Nashville, Tennessee, and WFPL in Louisville, Kentucky, were both established by their city's respective public libraries. CPL's interest in WBOE was criticized as the Cleveland school board had appointed many of the library's trustees. The school board held an auction for the station's license, with the minimum bid set at $200,000, and a stipulation that the winner would be responsible for renewing the station's license. Cleveland Public Radio bid $234,360.87 (equivalent to $1,039,633.85 in 2025) but this was rejected by the school board, which insisted that bids needed to be all-cash; CPR's bid was a mixture of a pledge from The George Gund Foundation and assumption of a Health, Education and Welfare obligation and other outstanding debt. (Note: The Health, Education and Welfare obligation was valued at $61,208.80 (equivalent to $271,525 in 2025). Cleveland Public Radio also pledged $150,000 (equivalent to $665,406 in 2025) in public service, with only $23,152.07 (equivalent to $102,703 in 2025) as cash.) CPL held the winning bid of $205,000 (equivalent to $909,388 in 2025) and intended to relaunch the station as WCPL by year's end with paperwork transferring the license filed with the FCC, but prior to consummation, WBOE's license was discovered to have expired on October 1, 1979.

Brad Norris

While the losing bidder in the auction, CPR contested WBOE's transfer to the library, filing a competing application for the 90.3 FM frequency on October 17, 1979. CPR chairman Brad Norris explained the filing was within the bounds of the FCC's 30-day period for public comment set aside for radio station transactions. Norris again offered a compromise and merger proposal with CPL by late 1979 that would create a new board with all 30 CPR trustees and all seven CPL trustees, giving CPR a 30–7 majority but also allowing for the WBOE license to be taken over as soon as possible and returned to air; Howley rejected this proposal, calling CPR's finances into question even with funding from the Gund Foundation. The Cleveland Board of Education filed to renew WBOE's license on July 11, 1979, which the FCC turned down on June 16, 1981, designating for hearing CPR and CPL's applications as mutually exclusive.

Pleadings with an FCC-assigned administrative law judge had both groups spar over which would best "serve the public interest". CPR touted its desire to be a community based nonprofit with regional support, while CPL saw the radio station as a valuable addition to its existing role as an information service. Animosity between Howley and Norris worsened as Howley called CPR "a nothing organization" in an FCC filing, while Norris publicly criticized Howley's conduct. Compounding matters, Howley was also the son of CEI's lead counsel, the utility Norris helped litigate against. Donald R. Waldrip, the court-appointed desegregation administrator for the Cleveland school board, filed a request with Judge Frank Battisti by late August 1981 to cancel the sale of WBOE to the library and instead sell the assets to CPR. Earlier in the year, Waldrip's magnet school proposal for the district involved a provision to possibly reopen WBOE, which the district had the ability to do as it still held the license, albeit expired. The FCC deferred on making a decision between the two groups, owing to both being qualified and politically well-connected, with some accusing the commission of timidity.

After a power increase on July 22, 1980, WKSU added Cleveland to its primary coverage area with the city receiving a city-grade signal but the CPL contested an additional power upgrade even as the library's director was not opposed to it. Howley and Norris expressed disappointment over failing to find common ground while Norris considered it "regrettable" a station based outside of Cleveland brought back public radio to Cleveland. WKSU's incursion resulted in a feud with WCLV and station president Robert Conrad, who sought to carry NPR fare unavailable in Cleveland, including a radio adaptation of the first Star Wars film trilogy. After NPR's board denied this request, Conrad pulled the Chicago Symphony, the Milwaukee Symphony and New York Philharmonic broadcasts off WKSU and threatened to do the same for Cleveland Orchestra broadcasts WCLV originated and syndicated. In turn, WKSU general manager John Perry threatened to deny the winner for the 90.3 FM license carriage rights for A Prairie Home Companion (syndicated by American Public Media, which unlike NPR, allowed affiliates to claim market exclusivity) as a bargaining chip against Conrad. The continued infighting between CPL and CPR prompted Edward Howard chairman John T. Bailey to call the absence of NPR from Cleveland "an embarrassment and a disgrace" in a Plain Dealer op-ed, including mailing addresses for both Norris and Carl S. Asseff (Howley's successor as CPL chairman); Bailey stated, "it is time to halt this embarrassing and costly dispute. Cleveland needs public radio. We need it now."

To weigh the effects, the vices, and the virtues of public radio in Cleveland would be, at best, speculative because one of the two NPR-designated stations is not on the air (as of press time). But this much can be said: WCPN intends to offer a measure of public-affairs programming and news that has been little in evidence in commercial radio here... because it is relatively well insulated from the ravages of a ratings-dominated marketplace. Thus WCPN is unlikely to degenerate into the frothy small-talk shows and quick-hit news segments that characterize so much of Cleveland's commercial news-talk stations.

— James Ewinger, The Plain Dealer, for CSU Gamut

A settlement was finally reached between CPL and CPR on June 24, 1982. Brokered over a cod dinner Norris hosted, the deal was borne out of Asseff's wishes to end the dispute, federal funding reductions in public broadcasting and local changes to tax funding for the CPL. CPR offered to expand its board of directors from 24 to 31 members, adding three persons each from the CPL and Cuyahoga Community College, plus one from the Board of Education for the first 10 years of the new station's existence. In turn, the CPL agreed to have CPR take control of WBOE's assets and withdrew their license application. CPR also agreed to provide airtime for school board news and to provide vocational training for students, and would air programming provided by Cuyahoga Community College and the Cleveland school board would donate their old equipment. The school board approved the proposal on September 9, 1982, also allowing CPR to assume a 1972 CPB grant awarded to WBOE for any technical upgrades.

Due to the way this arrangement was handled, the FCC dismissed the Cleveland Board of Education's license renewal application on October 18, 1982, officially deleting WBOE's license and concurrently issued Cleveland Public Radio a construction permit for WBOE's replacement. This new license was assigned the WCPN call letters on June 20, 1983, standing for "Cleveland Public Network". (Note: The Plain Dealer referred to the replacement license as "WBOE-FM" in their reporting and regarded the WCPN call sign assignment as "changing its station call letters from WBOE-FM to WCPN-FM"; this was ostensibly for continuity purposes as FCC records show the replacement license held no prior call sign.) Former WERE operations manager Leonard Will was hired as general manager, promising extensive local news coverage to augment NPR offerings. CPR initially planned for WCPN to sign on by the summer of 1983, but multiple issues, including securing studio facilities, interference from the Ohio Bell Building and NPR facing a financial crisis all delayed the relaunch until the spring of 1984, with both the Gund Foundation and Cleveland Foundation providing financial support. Transmissions resumed on May 7, 1984, again with a silent carrier after the CRRS successfully secured funding to reactivate the station's SCA subchannel.

The Woodhill-Quincy Administration building remained under Cleveland Metropolitan School District ownership after WBOE's closure and dissolution, but gradually fell into disuse and neglect. The district agreed to demolish the building in 2010 as part of a larger slate of 25 demolitions throughout the city.

== WCPN (1984–2022) ==
=== News and jazz revival ===
That's the only way we were able to get him here... (WKSU and WCPN) are walking arm in arm, each with a hand grenade that has the pin pulled, clasped in our teeth, and our hands on the trigger.

— John Perry, WKSU general manager, on teaming up with WCPN to book a 1985 Garrison Keillor appearance

WCPN decided to adopt a jazz music format after studies commissioned by the board of trustees found that no station in the market programmed contemporary jazz, along with a need for increased local news coverage after the Cleveland Press folded in 1982. WGAR (1220 AM), by then a country outlet, donated its entire jazz record collection to the station. A kick-off party/fundraiser billed "Cleveland's Big Turn-On" with 1,200 people in attendance was held on September 8, 1984, at WCPN's new studios in the Cleveland Centre building. This event included a live show featuring vocalist Mel Tormé at the Cleveland Masonic Auditorium, followed by WCPN making its formal debut at 10 p.m. that evening. Among the attendees were NPR president Douglas J. Bennet, Morning Edition host Bob Edwards, Dick Feagler and WBBG/WMJI owner Larry Robinson. The original format was "45% jazz and 55% news and public affairs", and the station expanded to 24-hour service on January 1, 1985.

Grade A (60 dBu) signal contours for WCPN (blue) and WKSU (red), c. 1996. Both NPR stations had substantial signal overlap in much of Cleveland and area suburbs.

WCPN's sign-on came not only amidst a significant financial crisis for NPR over the past fiscal year, but also with WKSU having been Greater Cleveland's lone public radio outlet for nearly six years with significant signal overlap. WKSU general manager John Perry noted that during a recent pledge drive, $85,000 out of the $105,000 raised came outside of NPR's offerings, speaking to WKSU's health and strength; Perry was optimistic of both stations co-existing as WCPN focused more on ethnic programming and jazz. Perry also estimated that one-third of WKSU's listener support now came from Cleveland proper. In 1987, WKSU relied on listener support for 60% of their annual budget, compared to WCPN relying on support for 40% of their budget. WKSU and WCPN notably teamed up to help co-sponsor a live appearance of Garrison Keillor as both stations carried Keillor's A Prairie Home Companion; Perry acknowledged that it was the only way Keillor's Akron broadcast could be booked. WCPN additionally became a sponsor for Cuyahoga Community College's annual JazzFest starting in 1985.

Local air personalities during the jazz programming included Jennifer Stephens, Harvey Zay and Dan Polletta; Polletta also did part-time work for WKSU hosting a blues program. Dick Feagler co-hosted a bi-weekly interview program at launch. WCPN added an evening news program Evening Edition, hosted by reporter Zina Vishnevsky, in November 1986 and mid-morning news program After Nine the following October. As a likely reflection of WCPN's growth, WMJI began airing a Sunday evening jazz program of their own in 1986, while Akron's WONE-FM started a daily late-morning segment playing a different jazz song every day.

=== Ethnic and financial contentions ===
So far we've been able to meet the payroll, but it depends on what's in tomorrow's mail. Our cash flow is like that of a small business: we live month to month.

— Kit Jensen, WCPN general manager

One particular contentious point with WCPN was the inclusion of ethnic programming on the schedule, which included Hungarian, Slovenian, Ukrainian, German, Slovak, Czech, Lithuanian, British, Serbian, Spanish, Italian and Jewish programs. A schedule realignment to accommodate the premiere of Weekend Edition in the fall of 1987 saw the programs consolidated into a 12-hour block on Sundays, eliciting anger among the newly established "American Nationalities Movement of Ohio" which attempted a takeover of WCPN's board. That attempt was unsuccessful with all existing board members retained. WCPN would cancel all ethnic programming outright on July 15, 1988, replacing the shows with jazz music. General manager Kathryn P. (Kit) Jensen, who joined the station in 1987, stated that the shows only attracted 5,800 listeners in ratings surveys, compared to 48,000 listeners the rest of the week.

Cleveland mayor George Voinovich expressed outrage over the cancellations and called on an investigation by the FCC while Senator Howard Metzenbaum delayed passage of a budget bill for NPR unless WCPN restored the ethnic fare, but Jensen vowed not to reverse course and received moral support from management at other public radio stations. By June 1989, WCPN reached a settlement between the ethnic show producers and the Cleveland Roundtable that restored much of the ethnic fare except for the Spanish, Italian and Jewish programs; a Polish program was also added. This settlement included a funding proposal of $185,000 in grant money for WCPN—including $90,000 from The Cleveland Foundation—as well as the establishment of a five-member advisory board and producer to work with the ethnic hosts. Community leaders also pledged to help raise funds to retire WCPN's $225,000 deficit and find a university affiliation for the station. An unidentified radio executive in remarks to The Plain Dealer considered the settlement "a bribe" and that WCPN "has now been usurped by an outside agency" that damaged the station's reputation. WCPN chairman Charles Marcoux tacitly confirmed this by saying, "we made a compromise, and no one has pretended it's anything other than a compromise".

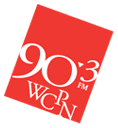
This logo (with the ideastream wordmark from 2001 onward) was used from the early 1990s until 2021.

The settlement came weeks after Cleveland Public Radio saw three longstanding leaders depart during the station's annual board meeting: chairman emeritus Brad Norris, vice president H. Andrew Johnson III and trustee Ben Shouse. Financial statements disclosed during that meeting revealed that WCPN, despite increasing corporate underwriters and listener support, was experiencing deficits after declines in unrestricted foundation grants. The station's news department was affected the most, with news director Vivian Goodman leaving to join WERE and a resulting three-person staff that primarily worked on After Nine and news inserts on Morning Edition; by comparison, WKSU featured local newscasts throughout the day and oriented coverage to include Cleveland. The Ohio State Legislature drafted their 1989 state budget with no funding towards WCPN but to Cleveland State University, which was to direct the funds to the station via a partnership; this was arranged to prevent a "free-for-all" with other Ohio public broadcasters. This, in turn, led WCPN to rely significantly more on membership donations via pledge drives, boasting a base of 8,000 supporters by 1993.

Additional underwriting support began to emerge. Progressive Insurance donated $48,000 earmarked for news coverage on urban-related issues and pledged an additional $10,000 if WCPN met a pledge drive goal of 248 additional supporters. WCLV itself became an underwriter of All Things Considered on WCPN starting in February 1990; in turn, WCPN was given commercial spots over WCLV to promote future specials and pledge drives. A donation from the Reinberger Foundation in 1994 allowed WCPN to purchase a remote truck for live broadcasts. Another substantial change came when WKSU dropped all blues-related programming in July 1990 to focus on classical and folk on the weekends, donating their blues library to WCPN. Jensen published an op-ed to The Plain Dealer in response to proposed funding cuts to the CPB by the 104th U.S. Congress, calling the CPB "...an appropriate and needed expenditure for the public good... an investment, as it were, in something that the country needs but that would not come about through market forces alone." As WCPN marked its tenth anniversary, Jensen reflected on WBOE's demise from outside forces as proof that WCPN's future could never be fully guaranteed.

=== Creating ideastream ===
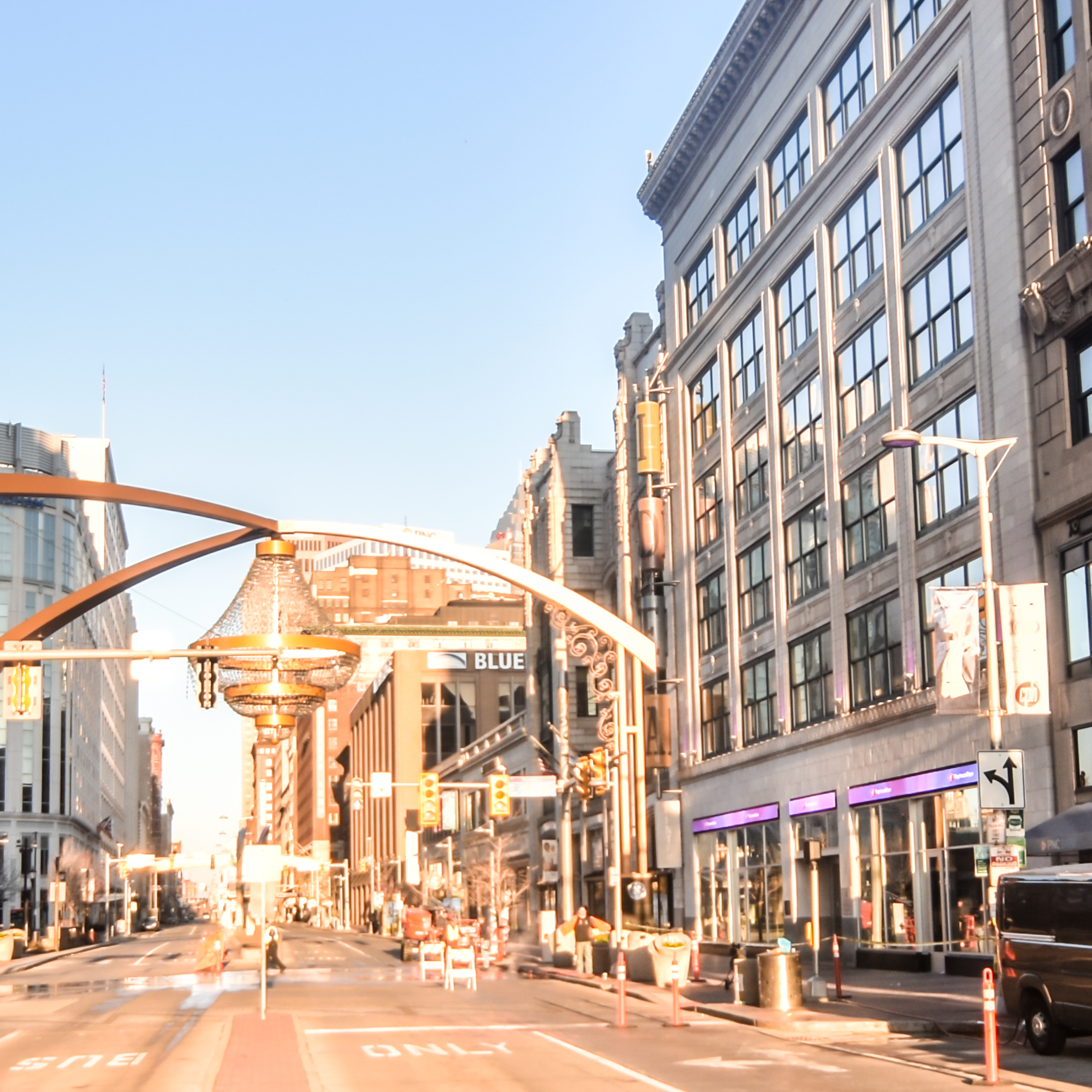
The Idea Center (right), ideastream's studio facilities and offices at Playhouse Square.

In 1993, Jerrold Wareham was named as WVIZ's general manager, succeeding station co-founder Betty Cope; shortly after his appointment, Kit Jensen first proposed the idea of both entities forming a partnership. Both stations collaborated for My Land, Your Land, a December 1997 WVIZ documentary on urban sprawl narrated by NPR's Ray Suarez that WCPN simulcast the audio of; despite multiple logistical issues in production, it was positively received among both station's respective audiences. WVIZ was negotiating with Cleveland State University in February 2000 for new studio space in downtown Cleveland to comply with a May 1, 2003, federal deadline for television stations to have high-definition equipment and publicly suggested long-ranging partnerships with Playhouse Square and WCPN.

On October 13, 2000, the license holders for WCPN and WVIZ agreed to a merger of equals, with Wareham becoming chief executive officer and Jensen becoming chief operating officer for the combined entity, ideastream. WNET president William F. Baker called the merger "wonderful news and the right direction for public broadcasting to be moving in... everyone winds up winning, especially the people of Cleveland." Most notably, both stations were almost entirely debt-free, a rarity among mergers in the industry following the Telecommunications Act of 1996. WVIZ's proposed facilities were realized with the Idea Center in Playhouse Square with both stations moving there in the fall of 2005. WCLV's successor station at 104.9 FM, which was launched in 2001, (Note: See WCPN § 2001 "frequency swap" and 2001 in radio.) moved to the Idea Center in 2010 and was donated to ideastream in 2011.

Despite WCPN's separate history, one visible reminder of WBOE's past is in display at the Idea Center: a large Works Progress Administration (WPA) mural painted for the Cleveland Board of Education by Louis Grebenak (husband of Dorothy Grebenak), one of several WPA murals commissioned by the city in the 1930s that was restored by the Intermuseum Conservation Association, a non-profit art conservation group. The WBOE mural was donated to Ideastream and publicly unveiled in the front lobby of the Idea Center in 2014 as part of WCPN's 30th anniversary.

=== News evolution ===
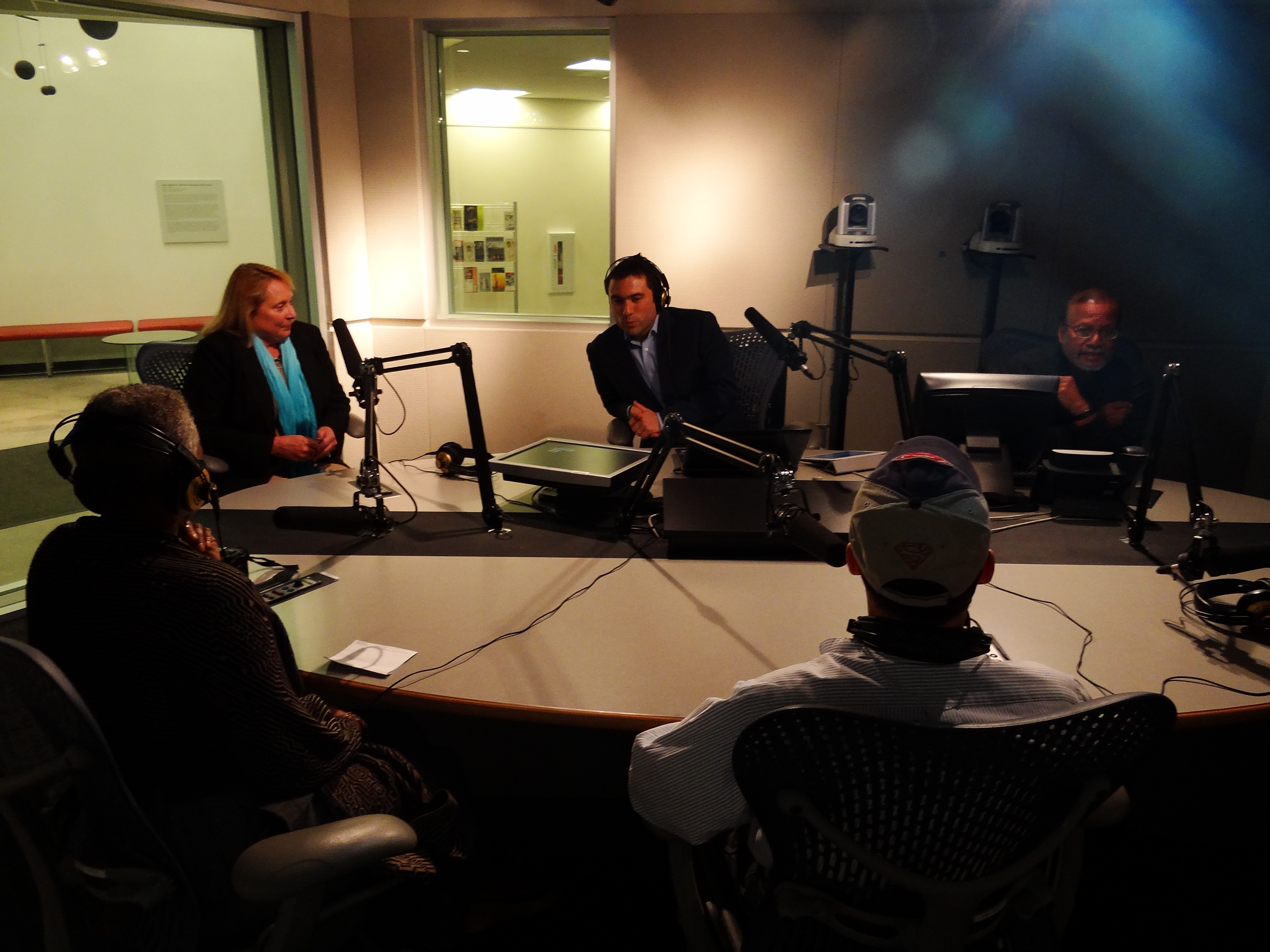
World Have Your Say host Ros Atkins (center) broadcasting from WCPN's studios, October 2012.

WCPN had been substantially evolving prior to the merger. In early 1997, the station had dropped most jazz programming during the midday hours in favor of news-oriented fare including The Diane Rehm Show and The World. The changes also called for another attempt at a reduction in hours to the Sunday ethnic lineup, but met opposition from Ohio governor George Voinovich, Cleveland mayor Michael R. White and Plain Dealer publisher Alex Machaskee. After the Ohio State Legislature inserted language into the state budget mandating the ethnic shows remain as-is in exchange for state funding said changes were rescinded. InfOhio, an early-afternoon program with an emphasis on statewide news was moved to late mornings as InfOhio After Nine while incumbent midday jazz host Dee Perry began hosting a daily arts-oriented newsmagazine, Around Noon. Following the merger, Perry also began hosting Applause, a similarly focused weekly program over WVIZ; Around Noon was renamed The Sound of Applause in 2013, tying it closer to the TV program.

By 2005, WCPN experienced some staff turnover attributed to the merger, with news director Dave Pignanelli leaving for WKSU in the same capacity and the news department shrinking from 18 staffers to nine; WCPN only employed four news staffers when Pignanelli joined in 1996. 90.3 at 9 (the former InfOhio After Nine) host Cindi Deutschman-Ruiz also left the station, with the show renamed The Sound of Ideas under succeeding hosts Dan Moulthrop and Plain Dealer columnist Regina Brett. An additional schedule realignment in 2006 saw a further de-emphasizing from jazz with the moving of Jazz from the Lincoln Center to Friday overnights, the cancellation of Jazz After Hours and locally produced Jazz Tracks with Bobby Jackson and the addition of BBC World Service programming overnights. Sentiment among former personnel was critical toward ideastream placing an emphasis on television over radio; Kit Jensen disputed this, saying that the station's audience and listener support base had both grown substantially, and that issues to secure funding were preventing staff vacancies from being filled. In a 2006 interview, Jensen explained the changes were "...to disrupt ourselves... to break down our own walls in order to partner effectively and... accept that we could not do this on our own... we had to subsume our own organizational ego..." WKSU's format adjustment in July 2013 placing a greater emphasis on news programming resulted in both it and WCPN now largely mirroring each other, carrying much of the same nationally produced shows. WCPN added NPR's Here and Now for early middays in the same time slot as WKSU, within weeks of WKSU's lineup changes.

[Living in Ada, Ohio and working for the Lima News] was fine until the job opportunity came at then-WCPN and I was invited to submit my resume for this Morning Edition post. I applied, and I went in for my interview, and when I walked into the studios it was like this feeling of, 'I'm home. My people.'

— Amy Eddings, former WNYC-FM personality, on joining WCPN in 2017

Dee Perry retired from the station on August 26, 2016, ending a 40-year career in broadcasting, with all local inserts during weekday NPR programming subsequently rebranded The Sound of Applause. Former WNYC-FM personality Amy Eddings, who had been that station's local host for All Things Considered until 2015, joined WCPN as local host for Morning Edition in March 2017. A native of Brunswick, Eddings also began involvement with The Downtowner, a weekly WCPN-produced podcast devoted to downtown Cleveland's revival. Plain Dealer reporter Michael McIntrye joined WCPN as host of The Sound of Ideas, sharing the duties with staffer Rick Jackson. Originally with WCPN as morning anchor, Jackson was moved to WVIZ to host the weekly panel discussion program Ideas and the children's-oriented newsmagazine NewsDepth. Meanwhile, WCPN was successful in reducing the allotted airtime for the weekend ethnic fare in January 2015 after the hosts of the Lithuanian and Serbian programs retired; the resulting schedule changes allowed WCPN to finally add the Sunday edition of All Things Considered. By the end of 2021, only three ethnic programs remained on the lineup.

On June 15, 2021, WCPN rebranded as "WCPN Ideastream Public Media" as part of a group-wide effort to celebrate the entity's 20th anniversary.

== WCLV (2022–present) ==
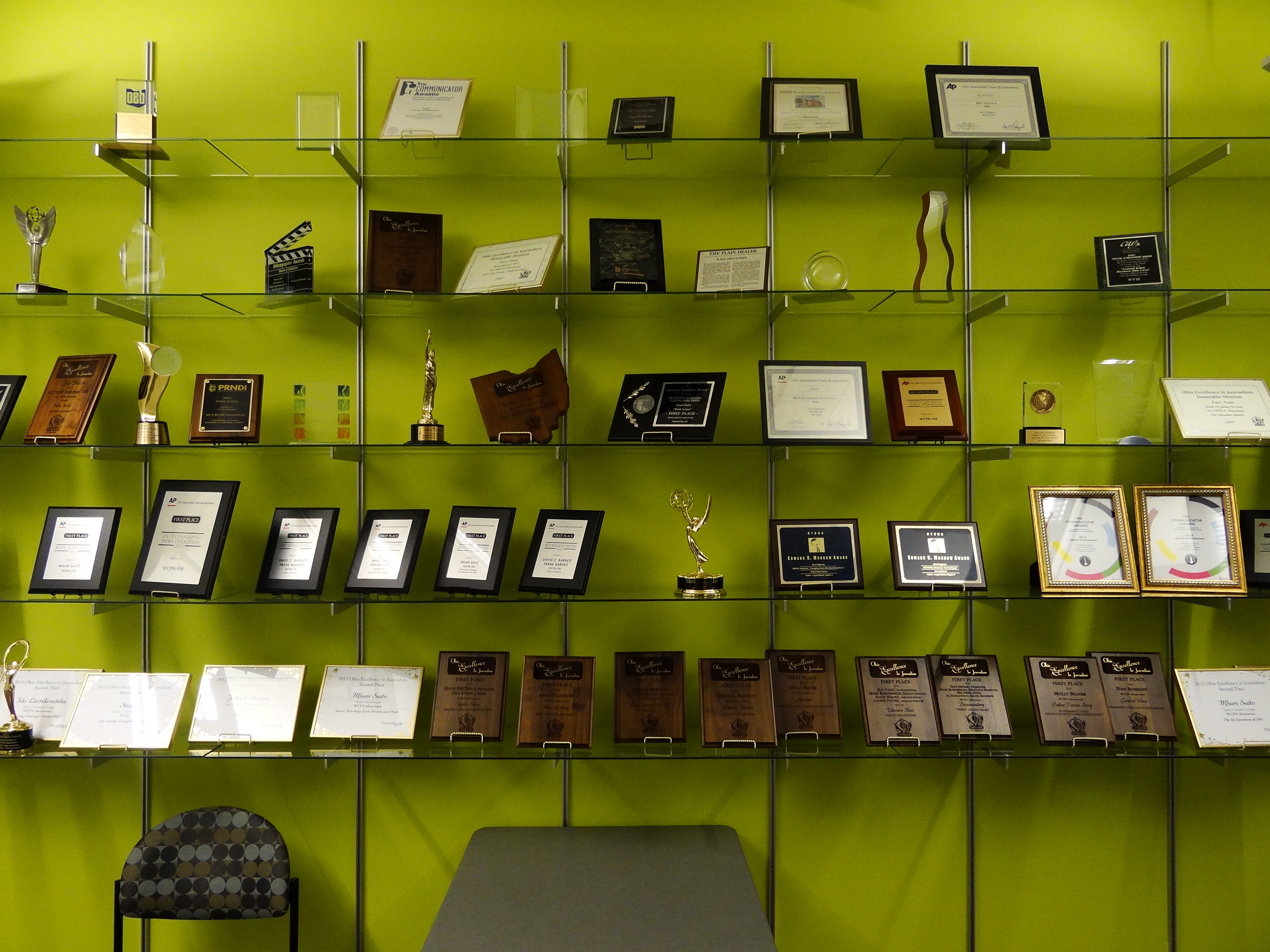
Various local and regional awards given to WCPN's news department, since merged into WKSU.

Kent State University's board of trustees and Ideastream Public Media entered into a public service operating agreement with the university's WKSU on September 15, 2021. As part of the agreement, Ideastream took over the day-to-day operations of WKSU and all its respective translators and repeaters on October 1, 2021, retaining all of WKSU's employees. This agreement had its genesis in a $100,000 CPB grant jointly awarded to WKSU and Ideastream on September 1, 2020, to help expand public media service in Northeast Ohio and encourage collaboration between both entities.

With this arrangement, a realignment of formats, stations and call signs took place on March 28, 2022. On that date, WCPN changed their call letters to WCLV and format to classical music, which was reported as WCLV "moving" to the 90.3 FM facility in WCPN's place. The former WCPN's format was "merged" into WKSU, which became Northeast Ohio's lead NPR station employing the off- and on-air staffs from both stations. Amy Eddings was reassigned to WKSU as that station's morning host and The Sound of Ideas and the City Club of Cleveland's Friday Forum were also moved to WKSU. Two of WCPN's three remaining ethnic programs—The Hungarian Program and The Polish Program—were retained and moved to WKSU's HD4 subchannel. Concurrently, WCLV's former 104.9 FM facility changed their calls to WCPN and became a WKSU repeater for Lorain County and the western portion of Greater Cleveland. The "new" WCLV at 90.3 FM also inherited WCPN's jazz programming for overnights, while WKSU dropped all remaining classical programming from their lineup.

Ideastream general manager Jenny Northern, WCLV air host Bill O'Connell and station president/co-founder Robert Conrad each expressed hope the frequency change would bring back longtime listeners adversely affected following WCLV's 2001 move to the 104.9 FM facility. At 90.3 FM, WCLV's potential audience was estimated to have increased by as many as one million people, particularly in Akron and Cleveland's eastern suburbs. Conrad's involvement with WCLV since the original WCLV's 1962 establishment is recognized as one of the longest such tenures in the format and his announcing duties for the Cleveland Orchestra broadcasts, uninterrupted since 1965, is also regarded as a record in American radio. Ideastream celebrated WCLV's "60th anniversary", recognizing the date WDGO (95.5 FM) changed their call letters to WCLV, on November 1, 2022.

== Programming ==
Local personalities heard on WCLV include Jacqueline Gerber, Mark Satola and Bill O'Connell. John Simna hosts the nightly Symphony at Seven, broadcast continuously since 1964 with KeyBank and its predecessors as the sole underwriter (Note: The contract was signed by The Cleveland Trust Company, which merged into Society National Bank in 1991; Society merged into KeyBank in 1993.) throughout the program's entire history. Peter Van de Graaff is heard in overnights. Weekend and seasonal programming includes Metropolitan Opera radio broadcasts, Performance Today, From the Top and Pipedreams with J. Michael Barone; the City Club of Cleveland's Friday Forum, which originates over WKSU on Friday afternoons, is rebroadcast over WCLV on Sunday nights. WCLV syndicates the Cleveland Orchestra's radio broadcasts, comedy show Weekend Radio and musical theatre show Footlight Parade, the latter produced by The Musical Theater Project.

WCLV's HD2 digital subchannel carries a full-time jazz format as "JazzNEO" locally hosted with Dan Polletta, Dee Perry and Simna, which is rebroadcast over WCSB (89.3 FM). WCLV-HD3 rebroadcasts the analog signal of WKSU, while WCLV is simulcast on the HD3 signals of WKSU and its full-power repeater network; WVIZ's 25.8 subchannel rebroadcasts WCLV in an audio-only format.

== See also ==
- WNYE (FM), former radio station of the New York City Department of Education
- WUKY, radio station of the University of Kentucky
- KALW, radio station of the San Francisco Unified School District
- KSIV-FM, formerly KSLH, radio station of the St. Louis Public Schools
- WRCJ-FM, formerly WDTR, radio station of the Detroit Public Schools
- WFBE, former radio station of the Flint School District

== Bibliography ==
- Atkinson, Carroll (1942). "Cleveland, Ohio: 1925 to date". Public School Broadcasting to the Classroom. Boston, Massachusetts: Meador Publishing Company. pp. 26–36. Archived from the original on August 13, 2020 – via HathiTrust.
- Ewinger, James (Winter 1984). "Cultural Fisticuffs: FM stations fight for programming, but Cleveland area audiences may come out the winners". The Gamut: A Journal of Ideas and Information (11). Cleveland, Ohio: Cleveland State University: 3–9. Archived from the original on September 2, 2020 – via Publications at EngagedScholarship@CSU.
- Helman, Edwin F. (January 1949). "Education Stations of the Nation—WBOE". The Journal of the AER. 8 (5). Chicago, Illinois: The Association for Education by Radio: 53–56 – via Internet Archive.
- Levenson, William B. (April 1946). "Educational Broadcasting: The Cleveland Plan". Hollywood Quarterly. 1 (3). Berkeley, California: University of California Press: 303–311. doi:10.2307/1209287. JSTOR 1209287.
- Levenson, William B. (1953). "Television for Children in the Classroom". In Paulu, Burton (ed.). Lincoln Lodge Seminar on Educational Television: June, 1953. Urbana, Illinois: National Association of Educational Broadcasters. pp. 51–61.
- Reed, Paul C. (January 1941). "Radio as an Aid to Learning". The Annals of the American Academy of Political and Social Science. 213, New Horizons in Radio. Philadelphia, Pennsylvania: SAGE Publications for the American Academy of Political and Social Science: 31–36. doi:10.1177/000271624121300106. JSTOR 1024052. S2CID 145374383.
- Rice, Jeannette E. (February 1941). "Presenting English Lessons By Radio". The Elementary English Review. 18 (2). Chicago, Illinois: National Council of Teachers of English: 35–41, 51. JSTOR 41382503.
