= WBGU-TV =

Television station in Bowling Green, Ohio

Satellite of WGTE-TV, Toledo, Ohio
- Bowling Green, Ohio; United States
- Channels: Digital: 22 (UHF); Virtual: 27
- Branding: WBGU PBS

Programming
- Affiliations: 27.1: PBS; for others, see § Subchannels

Ownership
- Owner: Bowling Green State University
- Operator: Public Broadcasting Foundation of Northwest Ohio

History
- First air date: February 10, 1964 (intellectual unit); March 24, 1973 (current incarnation)
- Former call signs: WQOL (CP, 1971–1973)
- Former channel numbers: Analog: 70 (UHF, 1964–1973), 57 (UHF, 1973–1986), 27 (UHF, 1986–2008); Digital: 56 (UHF, 2006–2010), 27 (UHF, 2010–2018)
- Former affiliations: NET (1964–1970)
- Call sign meaning: Bowling Green State University

Technical information
- Licensing authority: FCC
- Facility ID: 6568
- ERP: 137 kW
- HAAT: 320 m (1,050 ft)
- Transmitter coordinates: 41°8′12″N 83°54′24″W

Links
- Public license information: Public file; LMS
- Website: www.wbgutv.org

WBGU-TV (channel 27) is a PBS member television station licensed to Bowling Green, Ohio, United States. Owned by Bowling Green State University, it is sister to college radio station WBGU (88.1 FM). The two stations share studios at the Tucker Center for Telecommunications on the BGSU campus on Troup Avenue; WBGU-TV's transmitter is located near Belmore, Ohio. (While officially part of the BGSU campus, the Tucker Center is actually located two blocks south of Wooster Street, which marks much of the southern boundary of the campus.) Unlike the radio station, WBGU-TV is not primarily operated by students at the university; however, the station does offer many different student positions that allow students to gain experience.

WBGU is one of two PBS member stations in the Toledo television market, alongside WGTE-TV (channel 30) in Toledo proper. WBGU, along with Dayton-based WPTD, also serve as the de facto PBS member stations for the Lima market, as that market does not have a PBS member station of its own.

== History ==
WBGU-TV began broadcasting February 10, 1964, from a transmitter site on the campus. It operated on channel 70 and broadcast exclusively in black and white, as was then the norm, within a 15-mile (24 km) radius of the BGSU campus.

To increase the coverage area of WBGU-TV, the Ohio Educational Television Network Commission applied for and received a construction permit in 1971 to build a satellite in Lima on channel 57. In the process, however, what was planned as a separate station, WQOL, turned into a major transmitter upgrade for WBGU-TV. A new, 759,000-watt color transmitter and tower near Leipsic were activated when WBGU-TV—the last full-power station to broadcast on a channel 70 or above in the United States—moved to channel 57. WBGU-TV would move to channel 27 in 1986, expanding its coverage area and beginning to broadcast in stereo. Channel 27 had originally been proposed for the Lima satellite plan, but protests from the nearby WGTE-TV in Toledo, which operated on the adjacent channel 30 at the time and, because of significant territorial overlap, feared confusion between the two channels, prompted state and university officials to settle for the higher channel number.

The station first broadcast from a small studio located in the university's South Hall. After the Moore Musical Arts Center was built in 1979, the university's radio stations and telecommunications department (then the department of radio, television, and film) moved to West Hall, which formerly housed the university's college of music. Sometime after that, WBGU-TV moved to a new building located at 245 Troup Avenue in Bowling Green; the building was renamed the Tucker Center on May 6, 1994.

During the 1970s and early 1980s, WBGU maintained a low-powered repeater in Fort Wayne, Indiana, on channel 39, W39AA (later to affiliate with Indianapolis' WFYI), which became full-powered WFWA in 1985.

Former WBGU-TV logo

Today, WBGU-TV broadcasts to nineteen counties in northwestern and west central Ohio including the markets of Toledo and Lima. With most attic antennas, WBGU's signal can be tuned in as far west as Fort Wayne and as far north as central Lenawee County, Michigan. During tropospheric conditions, it can be seen as far north as Melvindale, Michigan, 87 miles (140 km) away with a very advanced indoor antenna.

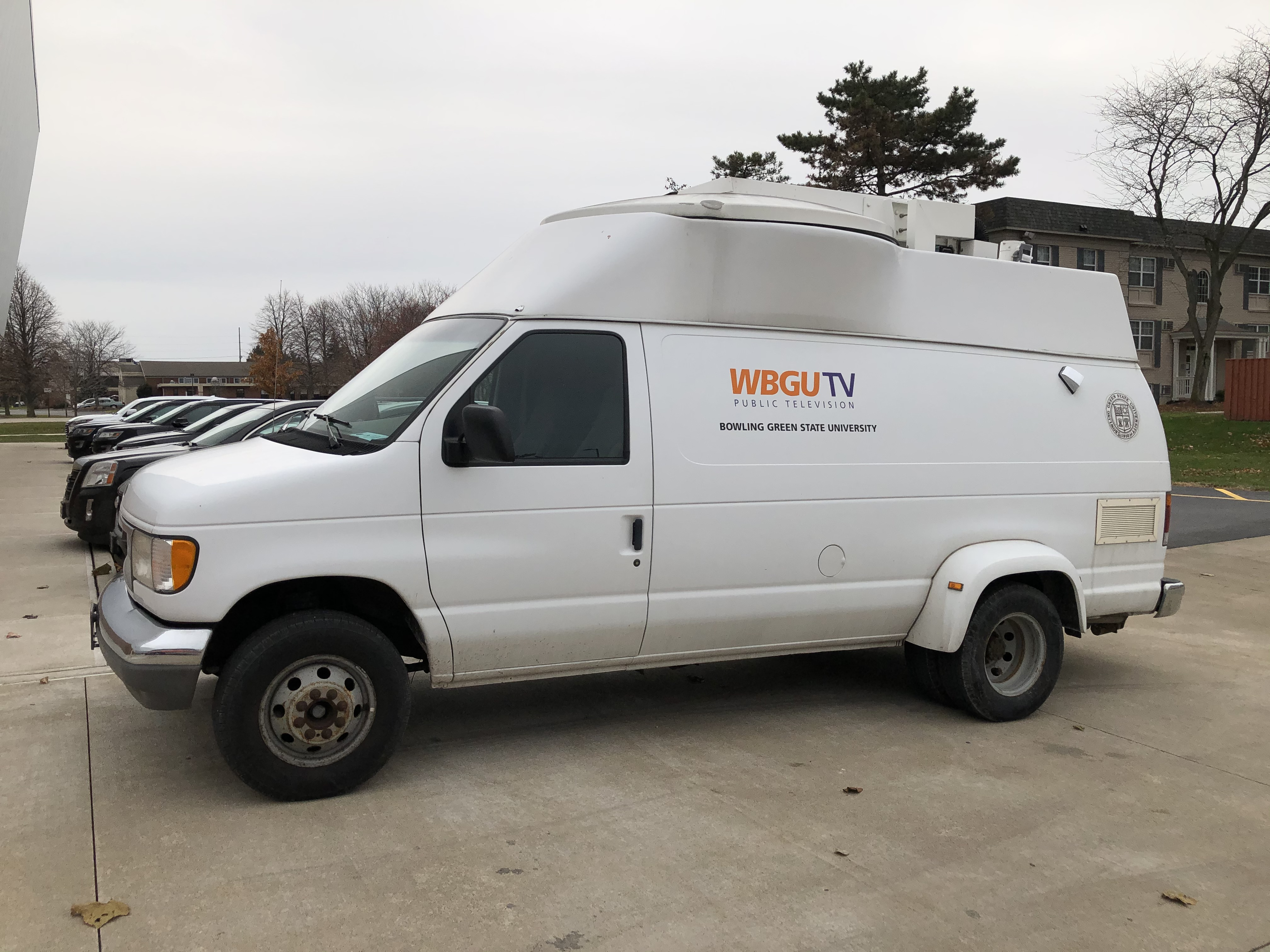
A WBGU news vehicle.

In Toledo, Buckeye Broadband carries WBGU-TV on cable channel 57, which is, ironically, the station's previous channel number on the UHF dial. No subchannels are available on Buckeye Broadband.

WBGU-TV shut down its analog signal, over UHF channel 27, at midnight on December 14, 2008, approximately six months before the official date on which full-power television stations in the United States transitioned from analog to digital broadcasts under federal mandate. The station's digital signal relocated from its pre-transition UHF channel 56, which was among the high band UHF channels (52-69) that were removed from broadcasting use as a result of the transition, to its analog era UHF channel 27.

In 2019, WBGU-TV won a regional Emmy Award for a training video produced in conjunction with campus police to help counter active shooter threats.

In January 2026, WBGU-TV announced that as a consequence of the end of federal funding and the closure of the Corporation for Public Broadcasting, WBGU would cease airing PBS programming from June 30 of that year, transitioning to airing The Ohio Channel afterwards. On June 3, WBGU would instead announce a deal with WGTE-TV, the PBS member station in Toledo, for WGTE to take over WBGU's operations, allowing PBS programming to continue on the channel 27 signal.

== Programming ==
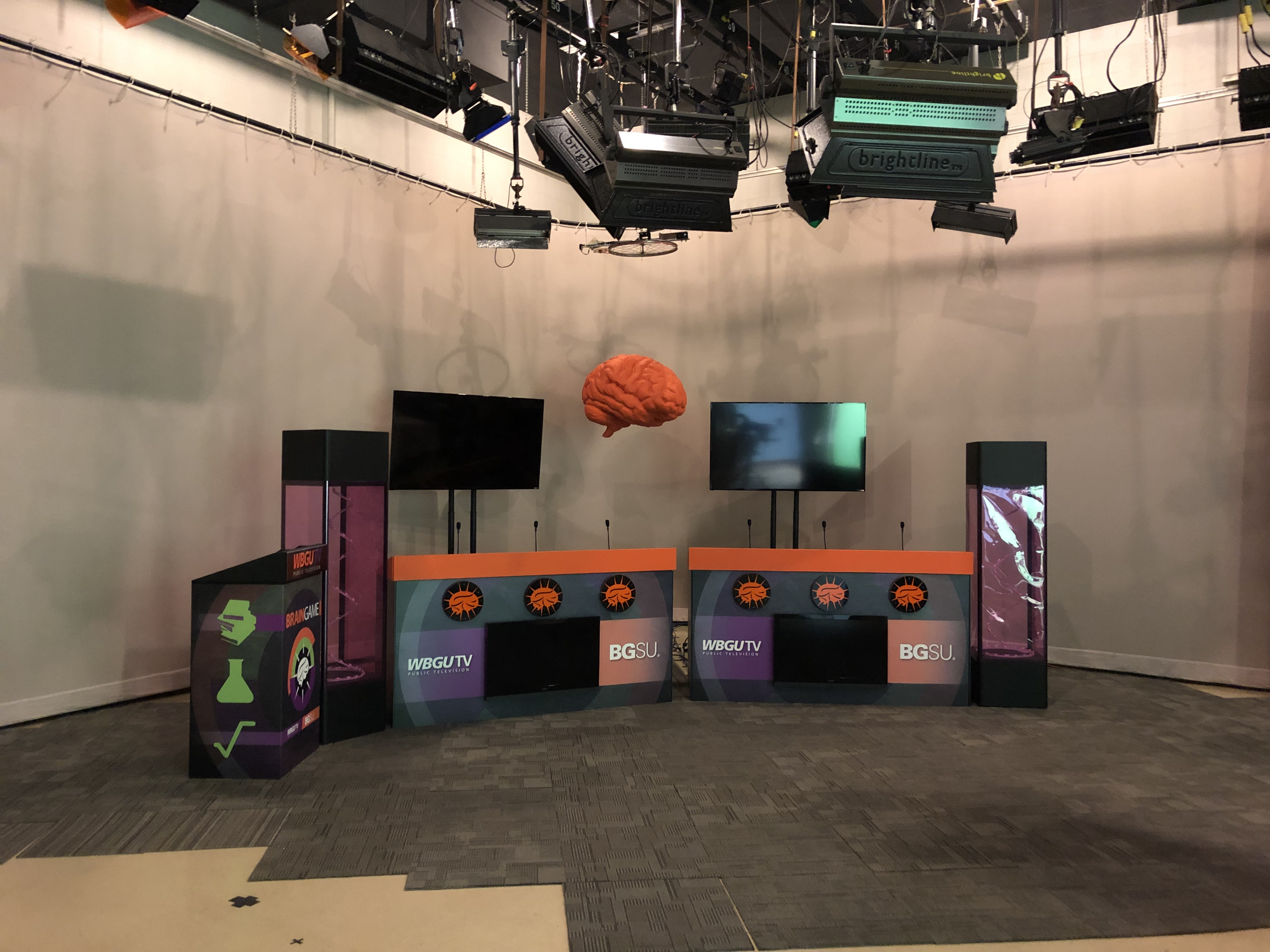
A WBGU television set.

National programming produced by WBGU includes The American Woodshop, distributed by the National Educational Telecommunications Association.

Each weekday during the academic term of public schools in the Great Black Swamp region, WBGU-TV broadcasts six hours of educational programming provided (and, in some cases, produced) by the Northwest Ohio Educational Technology Foundation. The NWOET is operated at the Tucker Center, but is a non-profit state agency separate from the university.

== Subchannels ==
The station's signal is multiplexed:

Subchannels of WBGU-TV
Subchannel	Res.	Short name	Programming
27.1	1080i	WBGUDT1	PBS (WGTE-TV simulcast)
27.2	480i	WBGUDT2	PBS Kids/The Ohio Channel (4:3)
27.3	480i	WBGUDT3	Create (4:3)
27.7	480i	WBGUDT7	Voicecorps Reading Service (4:3)

== Spectrum reallocation ==
WBGU-TV had considering selling off its UHF frequency as part of the digital spectrum auction, for mobile bandwidth use, but pulled out late in the auction bidding process. The station remained on the air, but relocated to UHF 22 from UHF 27 on December 4, 2018.
