= WNEO =

Television station in Alliance, Ohio

WNEO and WEAO
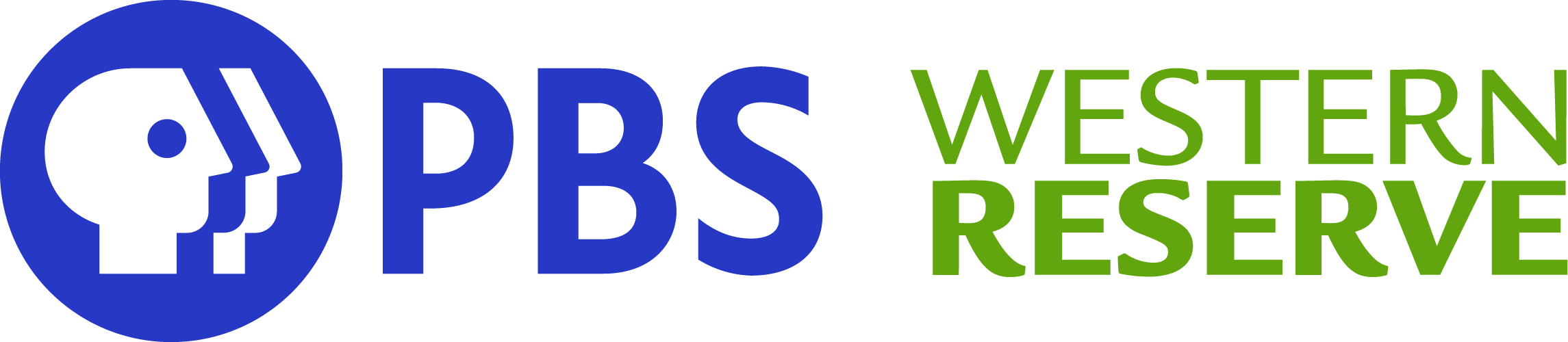

WNEO: Alliance–Youngstown, Ohio; WEAO: Akron–Canton, Ohio; United States
- Channels for WNEO: Digital: 29 (UHF); Virtual: 45
- Channels for WEAO: Digital: 24 (UHF), shared with WRLM; Virtual: 49
- Branding: PBS Western Reserve

Programming
- Affiliations: 45.1/49.1: PBS; 45.2/49.2: Fusion; 45.3/49.3: FNX

Ownership
- Owner: Western Reserve Public Media (merger pending with Ideastream); (Northeastern Educational Television of Ohio, Inc.)

History
- First air date: WNEO: May 30, 1973; WEAO: September 21, 1975
- Former call signs: WNEO: WNEO-TV (1973–1990)
- Former channel number: WNEO: Analog: 45 (UHF, 1973–2008); Digital: 46 (UHF, 2003–2008), 45 (UHF, 2008–2020); WEAO: Analog: 49 (UHF, 1975–2009); Digital: 50 (UHF, 2004–2019)
- Call sign meaning: WNEO: Northeastern Ohio; WEAO: Eastern Ohio

Technical information
- Licensing authority: FCC
- Facility ID: WNEO: 49439; WEAO: 49421
- ERP: WNEO: 465 kW; WEAO: 191 kW
- HAAT: WNEO: 251.1 m (824 ft); WEAO: 294.6 m (967 ft)
- Transmitter coordinates: WNEO: 40°54′23.2″N 80°54′39.3″W; WEAO: 41°4′58.5″N 81°38′1.6″W

Links
- Public license information: WNEO: Public file; LMS; WEAO: Public file; LMS
- Website: www.pbswesternreserve.org

WNEO (channel 45) is a non-commercial educational television station licensed to Alliance, Ohio, United States. It is simulcast full-time over satellite station WEAO (channel 49) in Akron, Ohio. Both are member stations of PBS and jointly brand as PBS Western Reserve. WNEO is the Youngstown market's PBS station of record, while WEAO provides the Cleveland market with a second choice for PBS programming alongside the market's primary PBS station, WVIZ (channel 25).

WNEO and WEAO are owned by Northeastern Educational Television of Ohio, which is a 501(c)(3) non-profit corporation (and formerly a consortium of the University of Akron, Kent State University and Youngstown State University). The two stations operate from studios on Kent State's campus on Campus Center Drive in Kent, northeast of Akron and roughly west of Youngstown. WNEO's transmitter is located in Salem, while WEAO's transmitter is based in Copley Township.

WNEO also operates W13DP-D, a low-power digital translator in Youngstown, which serves low-lying areas in the Mahoning Valley that are not covered from the main WNEO signal. The translator signed on as analog W58AM in May 1980, converted to digital as W44CR-D in November 2009, and moved to its current channel in November 2019.

== History ==
WNEO first signed on the air on May 30, 1973. It was originally intended to serve all of Northeast Ohio from Youngstown to Cleveland. Its city of license, Alliance, is split between both major markets in the region. Most of the city is in Stark County, which is in the Cleveland market; a small portion is in Mahoning County, which includes Youngstown. However, it was later decided to reorient WNEO to serve Youngstown and sign on a satellite station to serve Akron and Cleveland. That station, WEAO, signed on the air more than two years later on September 21, 1975. Prior to WEAO's sign-on, the channel 49 allocation in the Cleveland–Akron market was occupied by Akron-based WAKR-TV from 1953 to 1967, when that station moved to UHF channel 23. WNEO and WEAO were jointly branded as PBS 45 & 49 until late 2008 when they changed their on-air branding to "Western Reserve PBS", as part of the parent organization's overall branding change to Western Reserve Public Media in 2008.

On September 17, 2026, citing challenges facing public broadcasting (including the withdrawal of federal funding), PBS Western Reserve announced that it would merge with Cleveland's Ideastream; all staff will be retained, and WNEO/WEAO will adopt the Ideastream Public Media branding. PBS Western Reserve's Natalie Pillsbury will also become chief content officer for the organization as a whole.

== Technical information ==
=== Subchannels ===
The stations' signals are multiplexed:

Subchannels of WNEO
Subchannel	Res.	Short name	Programming
45.1	720p	WNEO HD	PBS
45.2	480i	WNEO FS	Fusion
45.3	480i	WNEO FN	FNX

Subchannels of WEAO and WRLM
License	Subchannel	Res.	Short name	Programming
WEAO	49.1	720p	WEAO HD	PBS
WEAO	49.2	480i	WEAO FS	Fusion
WEAO	49.3	480i	WEAO FN	FNX
WRLM	47.1	720p	WRLM	TCT

WNEO and WEAO carried Create on digital channels 45.3 and 49.3 and the Ohio Channel on digital channels 45.4 and 49.4 until August 2007, when the two subchannels were removed to make room for their high definition feeds. The analog simulcast of WNEO/WEAO remained on digital channels 45.2 and 49.2 until the June 12, 2009, digital transition, when they were replaced with Western Reserve PBS Fusion, a local service which aired concerts and music-related programs until August 1, 2009, at which point it switched to a mix of local programming; WNEO/WEAO then added MHz Worldview to digital channels 45.3 and 49.3 on June 13. WNEO and WEAO carried V-Me on digital channels 45.4 and 49.4 on September 19, 2009. The channel was discontinued in April 2017.

=== Translator ===
City of license	Callsign	Translating	Channel	ERP	HAAT	Facility ID	Transmitter coordinates
Youngstown	W13DP-D	WNEO	13 (VHF)	0.27 kW	186 m (610 ft)	49432	41°04′48.6″N 80°38′24.4″W

=== Analog-to-digital conversion ===
WNEO ended regular programming on its analog signal, over UHF channel 45, on November 19, 2008. Two days later on November 21, the station's digital signal relocated from its pre-transition UHF channel 46 to channel 45 for post-transition operations.

WEAO ended regular programming on its analog signal, over UHF channel 49, on June 12, 2009, the official date on which full-power television stations in the United States transitioned from analog to digital broadcasts under federal mandate. The station's digital signal remained on its pre-transition UHF channel 50, using virtual channel 49.
