= WVIZ =

Television station in Cleveland

- Cleveland, Ohio; United States
- Channels: Digital: 35 (UHF); Virtual: 25
- Branding: WVIZ Ideastream Public Media

Programming
- Affiliations: 25.1: PBS; for others, see § Technical information and subchannels

Ownership
- Owner: Ideastream
- Sister stations: WCLV; WCPN; WCSB; WKSU

History
- First air date: February 7, 1965
- Former channel numbers: Analog: 25 (UHF, 1965–2009); Digital: 26 (UHF, 2004–2019)
- Former affiliations: NET (1965–1970)
- Call sign meaning: viz. is abbreviation for videlicet, the Latin word meaning "namely"

Technical information
- Licensing authority: FCC
- Facility ID: 18753
- ERP: 219.5 kW
- HAAT: 330 m (1,083 ft)
- Transmitter coordinates: 41°23′9.9″N 81°41′20.7″W
- Translator(s): 30 (UHF) Cleveland; W34FP-D Eastlake

Links
- Public license information: Public file; LMS
- Website: ideastream.org

WVIZ (channel 25) is a PBS member television station in Cleveland, Ohio, United States. It is owned by Ideastream Public Media alongside classical music station WCLV (90.3 FM) and co-managed with Kent State University–owned WKSU (89.7 FM), the NPR member for Cleveland and Akron, and Cleveland State University–owned WCSB (89.3 FM). The four stations share studio facilities at the Idea Center on Playhouse Square in Downtown Cleveland; WVIZ's transmitter is located in suburban Parma, Ohio.

WVIZ began broadcasting on February 7, 1965, as Cleveland's first educational television station and the 100th such station in the United States. Its activation culminated years of work by business, philanthropic, and educational leaders to bring non-commercial television to Cleveland. For most of its first three decades of service under general manager Betty Cope, the station intensively focused on producing and broadcasting educational television programming for schools. WVIZ's commitment to instructional fare sometimes came at the exclusion of the types of national and public affairs series other public television stations in major markets began producing as the medium evolved. This began to change after Cope's 1993 retirement, with the introduction of a daytime schedule of children's programs as well as a weekly arts magazine and documentaries focused on area history.

In 2000, WVIZ merged with WCPN, then Cleveland's NPR news, talk and jazz station; (Note: WCPN changed call letters to WCLV and format to classical in 2022 as part of a format merger between WCPN and WKSU.) the combined venture, known as Ideastream, then moved to new studios in Playhouse Square in 2006. The station produces local news and arts programming to complement programs from PBS and other national public television distributors; Ideastream also manages The Ohio Channel, a statewide service.

== History ==
=== From educational radio to educational television ===
Cleveland had been regarded as a forerunner in educational broadcasting well before WVIZ's sign-on. The Cleveland Board of Education built and signed on WBOE, an AM "Apex" station, on November 21, 1938, as the first radio station fully licensed by the Federal Communications Commission (FCC) for non-commercial educational use. Converted to the FM band in 1941, WBOE operated strictly as an in-school educational tool for the next three decades. The New Republic described WBOE in 1949 as "a model for the country" and "the most exciting broadcasting job being done". Variety suggested in 1944 that WBOE could be a forerunner to educational television and was already "a close facsimile to actual television". Because of the FM band's obscurity, WBOE was almost entirely invisible outside of the classroom: radio supervisor William B. Levenson expressed hope of "a steady, if not rapid growth" in FM educational stations in 1941, but by 1958, WBOE was the only full-market FM signal receivable in neighboring Akron.

In 1952, when the FCC reallocated television channels after lifting its years-long freeze on new TV station grants, channel 25 in the new ultra high frequency (UHF) band was assigned to Cleveland as its reserved channel for educational broadcasting. Some interest existed at that time in allocating the channel, but no such station immediately materialized. By 1960, when leaders of various local school systems met to discuss the establishment of an educational station, Cleveland was among the nation's largest cities without one. Some steps were made in 1961 toward getting an educational station on the air, notably when the Cleveland Board of Education voted to refer a property tax to voters. At that time, members of the Cleveland Board of Education disparaged plans by a community association—the Greater Cleveland Television Education Association, formed in 1958—as not knowledgeable of the needs of the school system.

By June 1962, several interested groups had merged into the Educational Television Association of Metropolitan Cleveland (ETAMC), which absorbed the former association and also featured Levenson, now the superintendent of Cleveland schools, as a key member. The Cleveland Foundation provided a $250,000 grant to the association in November 1963, which significantly accelerated the process and made it possible for the new station to qualify for matching grants and apply for a construction permit from the FCC. Cleveland Broadcasting, owners of local radio station WERE (1300 AM), offered ETAMC usage of their tower site in North Royalton through a lease of $1 a month.

ETAMC formally filed for channel 25 on March 31, 1964, after receiving another $150,000 in gifts from two philanthropic organizations. While the application was before the FCC, the association received more gifts, including a $20,000 grant from Storer Broadcasting, owner of WJW radio and television. WJW-TV, along with KYW-TV and WEWS-TV, had previously allocated daily 15-minute blocks to air educational programming produced by WBOE staff, with $30,000 worth of television sets furnished to the classrooms. The federal Department of Health, Education and Welfare granted ETAMC $250,000 in September 1964, and the FCC granted the construction permit on October 9. Another major contribution of $100,000 was made later in 1965 by NBC chairman Robert Sarnoff following NBC's repurchase of the former KYW stations.

=== Taking to the air ===
WVIZ-TV began broadcasting on February 7, 1965; it had intended to start on February 1 but had been delayed. It was the 100th public television station to sign on in the United States. The first image broadcast on the station was their test pattern slide, with a silhouetted figure holding up a card reading "THINK" at the center. Initially, channel 25 primarily broadcast taped shows produced by other educational stations.

Betty Cope

One of the main organizers of the station was Betty Cope. A former producer for WEWS-TV, Cope joined ETAMC in 1962 as a volunteer, then became channel 25's first paid employee and the first director of local programming and production. Cope was named general manager on October 5, 1965, eight months after the station began and was the second woman to hold that position anywhere in the United States, after Dona Lee Davenport at the startup WTVI in Charlotte, North Carolina. (Note: Media in Cleveland reported Cope to be the first, a misdescription that lasted throughout her career, but she was narrowly beaten out. Davenport had been involved with WTVI for years prior to its August 27, 1965, start.) Cope and others at WVIZ had to contend with being Cleveland's first station on the UHF band. All-channel sets had only recently been mandated by law, and few people were buying new sets or UHF converters to view channel 25 at the outset. Cope recalled that when the station began broadcasting, the strongest response came from viewers in Akron and Youngstown, which both had commercial UHF television stations. As late as 1979, Cope told Raymond P. Hart of The Plain Dealer that she wished WVIZ broadcast on VHF, not UHF.

For two years, WVIZ operated from studios in Cleveland's Max Hayes Trade School, where programs had to be recorded in between school bells and production personnel joined students in weekly fire drills. The station began broadcasting color programming in 1967; that year, it left the trade school for larger quarters in the former Marks Tractor building on Brookpark Road, and it built a new, taller tower at North Royalton to improve its coverage area. In 1968, WVIZ was the first public television station to stage an on-air fundraising auction, generating $52,000 over three days. The auctions quickly became a successful source for operating funds; WVIZ raised $139,000 during the 1971 auction, and raised $447,759 by 1978, a significant portion of the station's $2.5 million budget. The station would host annual in-studio auctions for the next 50 years. Cope's continued presence headlining pledge drives led the Akron Beacon Journal to describe her as "usually asking immodestly for money" and the Lorain Journal to call her "the broadcast industry's answer to the ragged street-corner peddler". Cope was part of an early 1970s effort to keep the Corporation for Public Broadcasting (CPB) free from increased government control, serving on a board of station managers that negotiated directly with the CPB while also advocating for more local control.

WVIZ's emergence also coincided with the decline and failure of WBOE. With educational radio being rendered obsolete, WBOE struggled to incorporate National Public Radio (NPR) programming into a lineup that still featured instructional fare. Cleveland Public Radio (CPR) was set up as an outside organization aiming to bring a full-time NPR station to the city and made several rejected offers to buy WBOE. The Cleveland school system found itself in financial turmoil following years of litigation over segregation practices, a failed tax levy and fears of white flight. By April 1978, the district was in debt of $30 million (equivalent to $148 million in 2025) and threatened with outright closure. WVIZ was approached as a possible interim operator for WBOE before the school district shut the station down in October 1978. An attempt to sell WBOE's assets to the Cleveland Public Library sparked a three-year legal battle with CPR before a compromise between both parties allowed CPR to sign on WCPN on September 8, 1984.

=== Committed to the schools ===
[Cope] put the station on the air all around education. That was what she really cared about.

— Kent Geist, a WVIZ employee hired by Cope in the 1960s

As an educational station, it was primarily designed to serve metropolitan Cleveland; at the outset, it provided programming to 255,000 school students in 21 Cleveland-area school systems, and schools supplied $250,000 of the station's original $360,000 budget. The fees were assessed on a per-pupil basis, with the Medina City School District paying WVIZ a total of $3,920 for the 1969–1970 school year. While WVIZ was a member station of National Educational Television (NET), which was replaced by PBS in 1970, its local program production nearly exclusively focused on instructional shows for schools. For several years in the 1970s, WVIZ was the nation's leading producer of schools programs; between 1965 and 1987, it produced 2,000 programs, including 60 series. NewsDepth debuted in 1969 as a weekly news magazine tying currents events to secondary school curriculum. For a period in the 1990s, WEWS assisted in NewsDepth's production.

Other early local programs included high school sports coverage; a decade of coverage of Cleveland City Council meetings, which aired from 1967 to 1977; and the 1979 "carnival kickback" trial of George L. Forbes, which marked the first Ohio court case covered by television cameras. A February 25, 1972, Glass Harp rock concert from the WVIZ studios was simulcast in stereo over WMMS; the broadcast was conceived by WMMS program director Billy Bass, an early proponent of music television. Broadcast journalist Hugh Danaceau hosted a series of weekly public affairs shows over WVIZ in addition to anchoring the city council telecasts and local election coverage. Cope's preference towards local productions was modeled around the You Are There technique under the belief certain subject matter was best handled by someone who was well-versed in it and in that respective demographic. Staff from WVIZ's nascent years, including future WEWS Morning Exchange host Fred Griffith, aspired to have the station be a program supplier to PBS, but a lack of people, money and cohesive vision scuttled those efforts.

Some business leaders disagreed with the approach taken in constructing the channel 25 facility, believing that a site to the southeast near Streetsboro would provide better regional coverage and serve more people in cities such as Canton and Youngstown. This left an area that would ultimately receive primary public TV service from WNEO (channel 45) and WEAO (channel 49), which began broadcasting from Alliance in 1973 and Akron in 1975, respectively, as a service of a consortium of the University of Akron, Kent State University, and Youngstown State University. Though WNEO–WEAO was the secondary PBS station for Cleveland, two-thirds of its households did not receive WVIZ. In 1987, WNEO and WEAO sued WVIZ over its ability to withhold PBS programs from the Akron–Alliance station. The following year, the Akron Public Schools signed a one-year deal with WVIZ for instructional TV rights bypassing WNEO–WEAO, with the district crediting WVIZ's larger array of resources as a factor for the switch.

The Ohio Department of Education assumed the role of paying in-pupil fees to the station from the school districts in 1979. Even with the station's various fundraising efforts, in 1977, WVIZ's predominant revenue source continued to come from these fees and districts without a contract were unable to access programs listings furnished by the station. By the early 1980s, WVIZ's instructional programming lineup was networked by the Ohio Educational Broadcasting Network Commission in Columbus to other public television stations in the state. A lineup of internal fixed service channels were set up to relay additional in-school programming, along with an adult learner channel and a program block of college credit telecourses airing over WVIZ in the morning hours.

Starting in 1984, the station launched VIZ-TEC (WVIZ Technologies for Education Center), a long-range project to develop interactive video in the classroom accessible from computers, an early form of video on demand. Director Thomas A. Valenti believed such technology could be viable in five years and dominate instructional television in ten years but still believed in WVIZ's primary mission of "one-way educational TV" during the daytime. In 1987, WVIZ created EDISON, a database of subjects for its 2,400 educational programs; the format was adopted by other broadcasters, including Kentucky Educational Television, Wisconsin Public Television, and KCTS-TV. By 1995, the service had evolved into "Learning Link", an online database offering lesson plans and educational resources to over 4,000 area teachers.

=== An underdeveloped, untapped resource ===
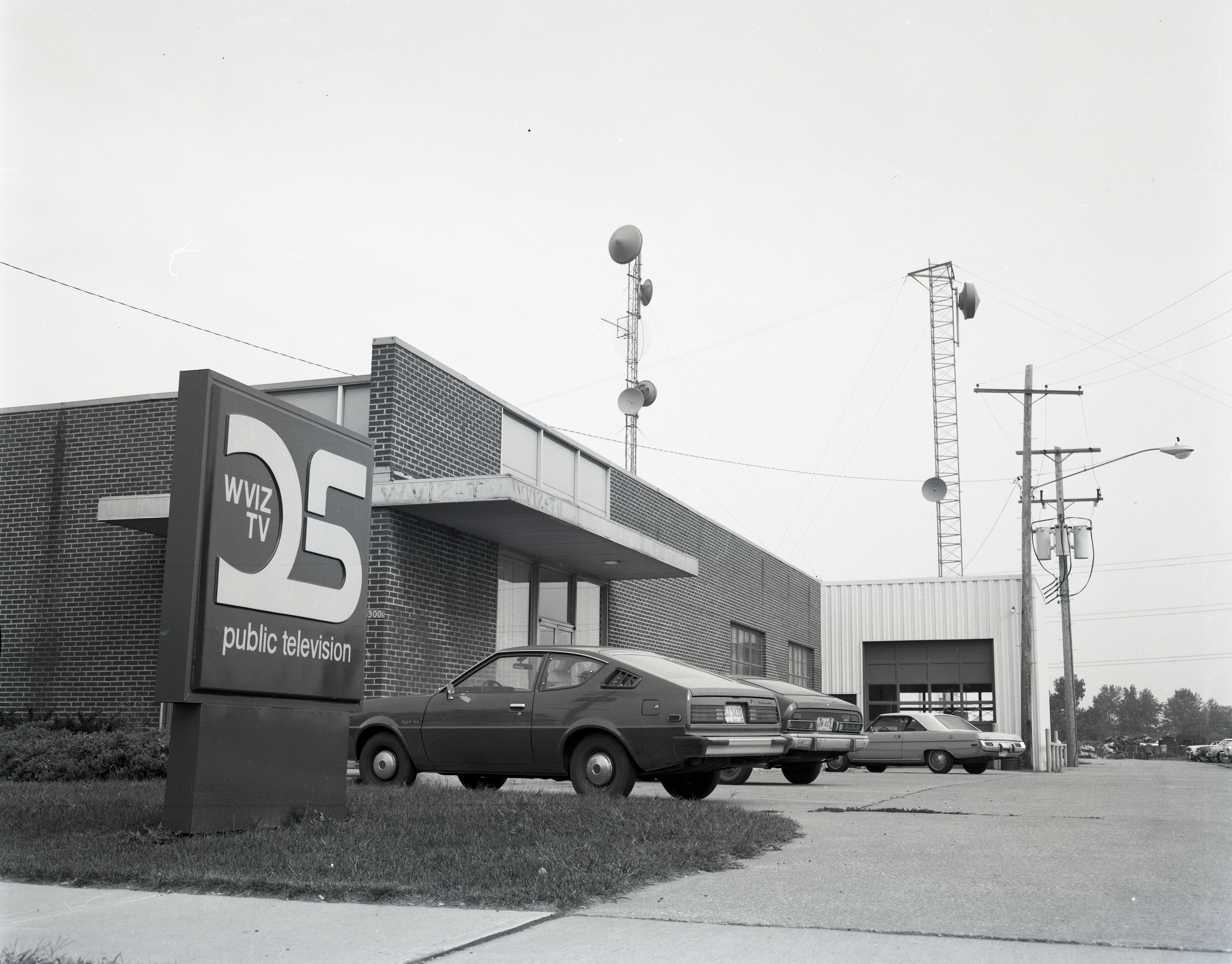
WVIZ's Brookpark Road studios, as seen in 1977.

In 1979, WVIZ hired WNET producer Milton Hoffman as its first executive producer; he oversaw several WVIZ productions before resigning in 1982. The next executive producer, hired in 1984, was Dennis Goulden, a former producer at NBC-owned WKYC-TV (channel 3). Joining the station out of concern for WVIZ's underutilized potential and "dismal image" among the public, Goulden was responsible for the creation of several programs and series, such as Kovels on Collecting, Producers Showcase, Medi-Scene, Dimension, and CookSmart. Because of Cope's stature at the station—likened to the "one woman, one vote" principle—Goulden credited her for developing these shows and also granting him a degree of creative control. Goulden also gave area attorney Larry Elder his first show, Fabric, having been impressed with Elder's interviewing skills and ability to offer a unique perspective.

Industry observers were critical of WVIZ for its near-total lack of national production or cultural programming for a city the size of Cleveland. Between 1965 and 1987, WVIZ produced just two series for national distribution, both featuring antique collectors Ralph and Terry Kovel (in 1972 and 1987), but never originated a program slotted for prime time airing over the network. While still heavily invested in school programming, WVIZ would feature and promote PBS staples like Masterpiece Theatre, Mystery! and NOVA during station pledge drives, with Cope admitting, "That's what people will pay for." WCLV (95.5 FM) announcer Bill Rudman pitched a possible show devoted to the arts, which Cope ultimately rejected, telling The Plain Dealer, "I never had a viewer ask for an arts magazine ... if you're going to give people something they don't know they want, you'd better give them the best darned communicator, or they won't want it." PBS executive Dee Brock lauded the station for their commitment to school programming but felt more could be done to accentuate local production, citing KLRU's success originating Austin City Limits for the network.

People in northeastern Ohio believe in having a community station that's not commercially supported. Also, I've been fortunate to have been here from the beginning ... I didn't have to iron out anyone else's mistakes. It's been done my way from the beginning.

— Betty Cope

Budgetary limits were usually cited as a reason for the local programming deficiency. KCET, which originated Cosmos: A Personal Voyage for PBS, came close to bankruptcy in 1982 after absorbing significant cost overruns producing the series. Severe cuts in federal government aid to public broadcasting in the early 1980s forced stations to operate on small budgets and forego local productions. While monetary issues were a major consideration, Cope also attributed the comparatively small role of WVIZ in the network to its intensive focus on educational programming; the greater resources of stations on the East and West Coasts; and the reticence of George Szell, longtime head of the Cleveland Orchestra, to have its concerts televised. Originally airing weekly, Medi-Scene was reduced to a monthly series after WVIZ refused to seek underwriting from health-care providers, fearing possible interference. The station was more invested in program development than risk taking and found it difficult to secure local underwriting for shows like The MacNeil-Lehrer NewsHour. Despite this, WVIZ was financially sound in the late 1980s, with revenues exceeding expenses and a lucrative annual on-air auction as opposed to WCPN, which saw a decline in foundation grant support, turnover in the CPR board, and cutbacks to their news department.

Criticism was also made towards the ETAMC board for failing to examine the role WVIZ should play for the region at large, with some board members unaware of WVIZ's local production efforts. In his Point of View newsletter, Roldo Bartimole assailed the ETAMC board's composition: 19 of the board's 39 members had been unchanged between 1976 and 1983, and included many influential area businessmen, corporate executives and investors. Bartimole said, "... the inbred nature of the WVIZ board shows up in the almost total lack of creativity in local programming. It's about as exciting as a rotten apple." Veteran media critic Bill Barrett said of the station in 1984, "I have always thought that, for a public broadcasting station, they (WVIZ) surely don't represent even a fairly sizable minority of the city ... I'd like to see a little more charisma there. In typical Cleveland fashion, they're conservative." Cope later admitted, "I don't think we've been as exciting as I'd like us to be."

1988 did bring one surprise addition to the station, as WVIZ was awarded broadcast rights to the All-American Soap Box Derby; WVIZ originated the telecasts for PBS via underwriter Bridgestone USA over the next ten years.

=== Evolving the station after Cope ===
On June 1, 1993, after 28 years at the helm, Betty Cope stepped down as president of WVIZ; in her tenure, she had become closely identified with the station. Upon her retirement, The Plain Dealer editorial board praised WVIZ for being a national leader in educational television but also criticized the station for not having a strong identity and suggested that their past ETV successes hurt the station in the long run among adult audiences. Cope was succeeded by Jerrold Wareham, the former general manager at Greater Dayton Public Television (operators of WPTD in Dayton and WPTO in Oxford). Following the practice of other public television stations under PBS's Ready-to-Learn initiative, WVIZ shifted its daytime schedule to primarily children's shows on September 19, 1994, originally branded as "KidTV on VIZ". The instructional programs and telecourses shifted to overnights for recording purposes a la Cable in the Classroom, as research found most area schools found it hard to slot time for students to watch programming in real-time within a class during the course of the academic day. WVIZ also lent its name in 1996 to a Store of Knowledge at SouthPark Mall in Strongsville via an equity interest partnership with Lakeshore Learning Materials; by the time the chain closed nationally in 2001, there were three such WVIZ Stores of Knowledge. Wareham began a five-year program with the goal of bringing WVIZ closer to three peer stations—KCTS-TV in Seattle, KTCA in Minneapolis, and KVIE in Sacramento—in viewer support and partnerships.

Local production increased under Dennis Goulden's successor Mark Rosenberger, including Feagler and Friends, a weekly panel discussion show hosted by Dick Feagler, and Applause, a weekly arts and culture show that debuted in 1998. A series of nostalgia-driven specials titled Cleveland Memories debuted in 1996, quickly proving popular among older viewers and inspiring the Akron-centered Akron Memories. Broadcasting veteran Bob Becker and wife Luanne Bole-Becker produced multiple documentaries, including a local tie-in to the Ken Burns miniseries Baseball, an examination of urban sprawl in the region, and other history-driven fare. WVIZ Cooks debuted in 1995 as a series of live cooking marathons focused on a single subject and became a fixture during station pledge drives over the next 20 years. Blue Suede Shoes: Ballet Rocks!, featuring the Cleveland San Jose Ballet, was nominated for two national Emmy awards in 1998.

Wareham's appointment also portended a significant, long-term change. After meeting WCPN general manager Kit Jensen by chance at a foundation office, Jensen sent Wareham a note saying, "I'm very interested in (a) partnership. Let's talk." The two stations collaborated for the first time with the December 1997 documentary My Land, Your Land, narrated by NPR's Ray Suarez and with an audio simulcast over WCPN; this effort was positively received by both audiences even with multiple logistical challenges. Privately, Wareham and Jensen continued to pitch the idea of a CPR-ETAMC merger through multiple board meetings and with the advice of area foundations and legal representation. WVIZ also started to publicly hint at a WCPN partnership when scouting possible locations for new studios that would be HDTV-compatible per a May 1, 2003, federal deadline.

The station led a live broadcast from Severance Hall of the Cleveland Orchestra in concert on January 8, 2000, commemorating the hall's reopening after an extensive two-year renovation. A joint production between WVIZ and PBS, the broadcast was fed live to other PBS stations around Ohio and aired on the national network in a condensed, hour-long form; PBS previously aired a repackaging by WVIZ of the Orchestra's 1990 concert at Royal Albert Hall.

=== Formation of Ideastream ===
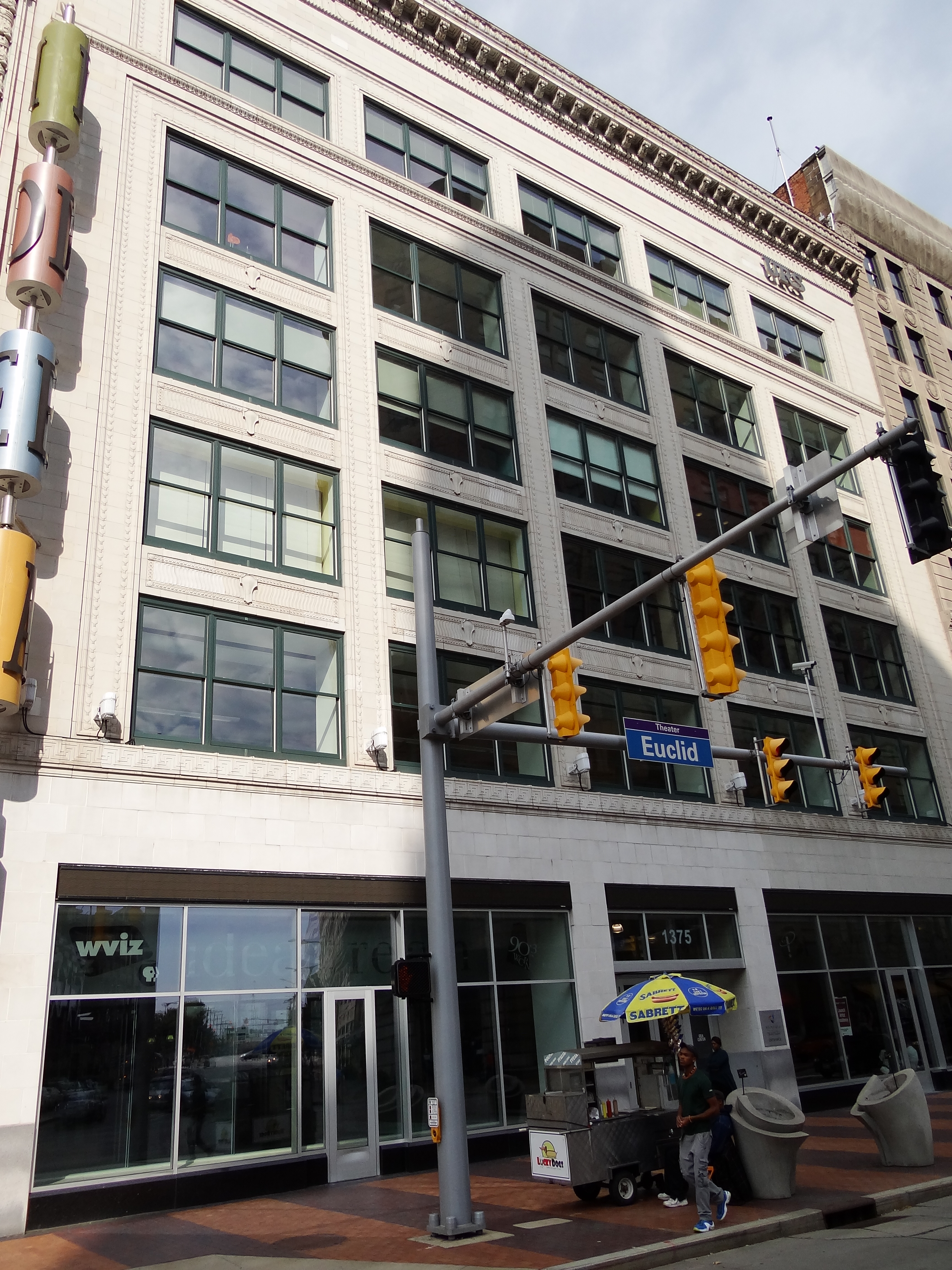
The Idea Center at Playhouse Square

After years of deliberation, CPR and ETAMC agreed to a merger of equals on October 13, 2000, to establish a unified source for public broadcasting along with capitalizing on the potential of both online and digital media. Both CPR and ETAMC were almost entirely debt-free, unusual among most mergers and acquisitions following the Telecommunications Act of 1996. While public radio–TV combinations were already common throughout the United States, this marked the first merger between two free-standing public stations.

To emphasize the merger placing both stations on equal footing, the board of directors from CPR and ETAMC were combined into a single board with 62 members, while Wareham became chief executive officer and Jensen became chief operating officer for the new entity, Ideastream. William F. Baker, a Cleveland native and president of WNET, hailed the merger as "... the right direction for public broadcasting to be moving in ... everyone winds up winning, especially the people of Cleveland". The proposed digital-capable studio facility for WVIZ was realized with the Idea Center at Playhouse Square in the Cleveland Theater District; both it and WCPN moved there in the fall of 2005.

The merger allowed WCPN talent to appear on WVIZ productions and vice versa. Dee Perry, host of WCPN's midday arts show Around Noon, took over as host of Applause; by 2013, Around Noon was renamed The Sound of Applause. WCPN host Rick Jackson was reassigned to host WVIZ's NewsDepth in 2005, then added hosting duties for Ideas in 2013 (replacing Feagler and Friends) and eventually WCPN's The Sound of Ideas. The changes, coupled with the loss of several WCPN news staffers and an overall blending of off- and on-air staffs, yielded criticism in 2005 among listeners who felt WVIZ now took priority in Ideastream, a charge Jensen disputed. Several multiplatform projects focusing on Greater Cleveland's economic issues debuted over WVIZ and WCPN during the 2000s through partnerships with The Plain Dealer and Case Western Reserve University. Mark Rosenberger was elevated to director of production and local programming at WVIZ and, in 2018, was named Ideastream's chief content officer.

WVIZ and WCPN were among a list of backing partners for a nonprofit organization created on November 1, 2000, to operate WCLV and its classical format, with a complex asset swap of several area radio stations re-establishing the station at 104.9 FM in Lorain on July 3, 2001. (Note: See WCPN § 2001 "frequency swap" and 2001 in radio.) WCLV moved their studios to the Idea Center in 2010, was donated to Ideastream the following year and converted to non-commercial status on January 1, 2013. Another addition to the group, WKSU (89.7 FM) in Kent, Ohio, took place on October 1, 2021, via a public service operating agreement with WKSU owner Kent State University. A realignment of Ideastream's radio stations the following March saw WCPN merge operations into WKSU, WCLV's format and call sign move to the former WCPN and the former WCLV become a WKSU repeater. WCLV has carried radio broadcasts of the Cleveland Orchestra since 1965; accordingly, the orchestra has increasingly collaborated with WVIZ for national productions, including a 2018 centennial concert shown on Great Performances and several concerts distributed by American Public Television. During the COVID-19 pandemic, WVIZ broadcast excerpts of the orchestra's digital concerts.

While the Idea Center was originally designed with an abundance of space for both radio and television, Cleveland State University's film and media arts department moved in as a tenant in space usually reserved for WVIZ's fundraising auctions; this resulted in the station's 2018 auction being "reimagined" without in-studio volunteers, ending a 50-year run of auctions for the station. Terry Kovel, who had volunteered as an auctioneer alongside her husband Ralph since 1968, expressed disappointment over the move, saying, "It's a family... It's been a wonderful thing for the city."

In August 2004, WVIZ began broadcasting in digital on channel 26; the station ceased analog broadcasting on June 12, 2009, continuing in digital only on the same channel. The conversion also came with a tower site change as WVIZ moved their permanent digital signal to a newly constructed tower in Parma, Ohio, shared with WKYC. WVIZ relocated its signal from channel 26 to channel 35 on August 2, 2019, as a result of the 2016 United States wireless spectrum auction.

On June 15, 2021, as part of a group-wide effort to celebrate Ideastream's 20th anniversary, WVIZ rebranded as "Ideastream Public Media WVIZ".

== Local programming ==
In 1969, WVIZ debuted NewsDepth, a weekly news program for schools; the program remains in active production to the current day. The station also features Ideas, a weekly current events show that also serves as an extension of WKSU's The Sound of Ideas. Applause, a weekly arts magazine, has been in continuous production since 1998. WVIZ also originates the City Club of Cleveland's Friday Forum with WKSU; since 1992, select installments of the Friday Forum have been rebroadcast nationally over C-SPAN.

WVIZ and WKSU jointly manage the Statehouse News Bureau in Columbus for both public radio and television stations across the state; the bureau also produces The State of Ohio, a weekly news program. WVIZ additionally manages The Ohio Channel, a digital subchannel, on behalf of Ohio's public television stations.

== Technical information and subchannels ==
WVIZ's transmitter is located in suburban Parma, Ohio. The station's signal is multiplexed:

Subchannels of WVIZ
Subchannel	Res.	Short name	Programming
25.1	1080i	WVIZ-HD	PBS
25.2	480i	Ohio Ch	The Ohio Channel
25.4	480i	Create	Create
25.5	720p	KIDS	PBS Kids
25.7	Audio only	WKSU	WKSU simulcast
25.8	Audio only	WCLV	WCLV simulcast
25.9	Audio only	CSCN	Cleveland Sight Center Network

=== Translators ===
WVIZ's translator licensed to Eastlake, W34FP-D, is the last surviving rebroadcaster in a series of transmitters added in the 1970s to improve WVIZ's service to areas east of Cleveland impacted by terrain. The first was installed in Chagrin Falls in October 1977. Service was extended on July 17, 1978, to Ashtabula County on channel 64 and to Geauga and Lake County on channel 67 (the present channel 34). During the repack, the digital replacement translator on channel 30 was installed to improve service in areas to the north and east of downtown Cleveland.

Translators of WVIZ
Call sign	City of license	Channel	ERP	HAAT	Facility ID	Transmitter coordinates
W34FP-D	Eastlake	34	9.2 kW	159.7 m (524.0 ft)	18559	41°41′28.2″N 81°02′47.3″W
WVIZ (DRT)	Cleveland	30	8.5 kW	65.1 m (213.6 ft)	18753	41°30′12″N 81°40′29″W

Grade A signal contours for WVIZ and all associated translators. All broadcast on virtual channel 25.; WVIZ; WVIZ (DRT); W34FP-D

== Notable alumni ==
- Dr. Jearl Walker, host of The Kinetic Karnival
