= WGTE-FM =

Toledo, Ohio; United States
- Broadcast area: Northwest Ohio; Southeast Michigan
- Frequency: 91.3 MHz
- Branding: WGTE FM 91

Programming
- Format: Public Radio; Classical
- Affiliations: National Public Radio; Public Radio Exchange; American Public Media

Ownership
- Owner: Public Broadcasting Foundation of Northwestern Ohio
- Sister stations: WGTE-TV

History
- First air date: May 2, 1976
- Call sign meaning: "Greater Toledo Education"

Technical information
- Licensing authority: FCC
- Facility ID: 66287
- Class: B
- ERP: 13,500 watts
- HAAT: 289 meters (948 ft)
- Transmitter coordinates: 41.658°N 83.432°W
- Repeaters: 90.9 WGBE (Bryan); 91.9 WGDE (Defiance); 90.7 WGLE (Lima)

Links
- Public license information: Public file; LMS
- Webcast: Listen live
- Website: www.wgte.org

WGTE-FM (91.3 MHz) is a non-commercial, listener-supported, public radio station in Toledo, Ohio, and is the sister station of Channel 30 WGTE-TV, Toledo's PBS network affiliate. WGTE-FM features classical music and jazz along with news and talk. It is a member of National Public Radio and also carries programs from other public radio networks. The studios and offices are on South Detroit Avenue.

WGTE-FM is a Class B station. It has an effective radiated power (ERP) of 13,500 watts. The transmitter is on Corduroy Road at North Wynn Avenue in Oregon, Ohio. Programming is simulcast on three other Ohio radio stations: WGBE (90.9 FM) in Bryan, WGDE (91.9 FM) in Defiance and WGLE (90.7 FM) in Lima. Several times each year, WGTE-FM holds on-air fundraisers to ask for listener support.

== Programming ==
Most of the day, WGTE-FM airs classical music. But on weekdays, it breaks during morning drive time, middays and afternoons for news and information programs from NPR: Morning Edition, Here and Now, Marketplace and All Things Considered.

On weekends, it mixes music programs with one-hour weekly public radio shows: Snap Judgement, Milk Street Radio, Radiolab, This American Life, The Moth Radio Hour, Hidden Brain, Travel with Rick Steves, On The Media and Wait, Wait, Don't Tell Me. On Friday and Saturday evenings, the music switches to jazz. And on weekends, specialty music programs are heard: Hearts of Space, The Thistle and Shamrock, Pipedreams and during the season, The Metropolitan Opera.

== History ==
WGTE-FM signed on the air on May 2, 1976. At first, its programming was classical music with six hours of jazz per week and hourly news updates. WGTE-FM is the only radio station in the area broadcasting classical music after WMHE-FM dropped the format a few years ago. It also featured NPR's first weekday news program, All Things Considered.

When NPR began Morning Edition in 1979, that program was also heard on the weekday schedule. Gradually more news and talk programs from NPR and PRI were added, although unlike most other NPR affiliates, WGTE-FM continues to air a sizable number of classical music programs with some jazz music and other genres on weekends.

In 1981, WGLE-FM in Lima became the first simulcast station of WGTE-FM. WGBE-FM in Bryan was added in 1996 and WGDE-FM in Defiance signed on in 1999.

== Repeaters ==
Call sign	Frequency	City of license	FID	ERP (W)	HAAT	Class	Transmitter coordinates	FCC info
WGBE	90.9 FM	Bryan, Ohio	53733	850	120 m (394 ft)	A	41°28′47″N 84°35′50″W	LMS
WGDE	91.9 FM	Defiance, Ohio	53713	6,000	93 m (305 ft)	A	41°17′41″N 84°23′24″W	LMS
WGLE	90.7 FM	Lima, Ohio	53715	50,000	128 m (420 ft)	B	40°39′04″N 84°06′33″W	LMS
