= The Ohio Channel =

- Country: United States
- Broadcast area: Statewide Ohio
- Network: PBS
- Affiliates: WVIZ; WBGU-TV; WCET; WGTE-TV; WNEO–WEAO; WOSU-TV; WPTD–WPTO; WOUB-TV
- Headquarters: Columbus, Ohio

Programming
- Language(s): English

Ownership
- Owner: Ohio Government Telecommunications

History
- Launched: 1996

Links
- Website: www.ohiochannel.org

Availability

Terrestrial
- WOSU 34.2 Columbus; WVIZ 25.2 Cleveland; WPTD 16.4 Dayton; WPTO 14.4 Cincinnati; WGTE 30.3^{1} Toledo; WBGU 27.2^{1} Bowling Green; WNEO 45.2^{2} Youngstown; WEAO 49.2^{2} Canton; ^{1} Overnights only; ^{2} Mornings only

The Ohio Channel is a service of Ohio's public broadcasting stations that operates out of the Ohio Statehouse in Columbus, Ohio. The Ohio Channel, on behalf of its parent company Ohio Government Telecommunications, produces gavel-to-gavel, unedited video coverage of official sessions of the Ohio Senate, the Ohio House of Representatives, and the Supreme Court of Ohio. In addition to these official sessions, The Ohio Channel covers various Office of the Governor of Ohio events, news conferences and bill signings, other state agency proceedings and events, and public affairs and educational programming.

The mission of the Ohio Channel is to provide the citizens of Ohio with unbiased, unedited, and non-partisan access to public proceedings of the state government and to inform the public about current topics that affect their communities.

== Services ==
The Ohio Channel streams video of official sessions live over the internet and broadcasts those sessions live on over-the-air PBS affiliates across the state of Ohio. Videos are immediately archived on the web for future viewing. Ohio Senate and Ohio House of Representatives sessions from 1996 to the present are available for viewing online, and coverage and archives of the Supreme Court of Ohio oral arguments from 2004 to the present are also available.

Unofficial events are covered by The Ohio Channel on a by-request basis from state organizations and agencies holding the event. Hundreds of Governor's bill signings and news conferences of the Ohio General Assembly, Lieutenant Governor of Ohio, Ohio Attorney General, Ohio State Treasurer and many administrative agencies are available online.

In addition to providing video coverage of state government, The Ohio Channel also distributes public affairs and educational programming. By partnering with PBS stations around the state, The Ohio Channel broadcasts videos of regional radio talk programs including WOSU-FM's All Sides with Ann Fisher and WKSU's The Sound of Ideas, plus rebroadcasts of WOSU-TV's Columbus On The Record and WVIZ's Ideas. The Ohio Channel also broadcasts its own programming featuring Ohio history, culture and public affairs.

The Ohio Channel updates weekly its broadcast schedule, and the channel locator allows viewers to find the Ohio Channel based on region of the state and distributor.

== Early history ==
The Ohio Channel was created in 1996 upon the completion of the restoration of the Ohio Statehouse. Beginning in 1993 after the restoration of the Senate Building and Atrium, restoration of the Ohio Statehouse included wiring the buildings for video and broadcast coverage.

== Current history and growth ==
The Ohio Channel began tracking video views on its website in 2011 and reached over 6 million total web views in one year. The Ohio Channel began covering all committee hearings for the Ohio House of Representatives and the Ohio Senate in 2020.
