= Dick Feagler =

American journalist

- Born: July 29, 1938; Cleveland, Ohio, U.S.
- Died: July 1, 2018 (aged 79); Cleveland, Ohio, U.S.
- Occupations: Newspaper columnist Television personality TV and radio News anchor Playwright
- Years active: 1960-2013
- Awards: Peabody Award (1991); DuPont-Columbia Award(1991); Press Club's Cleveland Journalism Hall of Fame (1994); 23 total Emmy Awards wins (Cleveland Area); United Press International {UPI

Richard Feagler (July 29, 1938 – July 1, 2018) was an American journalist, playwright and television personality from Cleveland, Ohio. After attending Ohio University, he entered journalism in 1963, writing obituaries for the Cleveland Press. In 1970 Feagler started a regular feature column that continued until the Press closed in 1982.

== Career biography, credentials ==
Feagler continued to write his column for numerous Ohio newspapers, including the Akron Beacon Journal, the Willoughby News-Herald and the Elyria Chronicle-Telegram. The Plain Dealer began running the column in 1993. Feagler provided regular news commentaries for WKYC-TV and WEWS-TV, and hosted the talk show, Feagler! during a brief stint co-anchoring TV-3’s evening newscasts from 1991 to 1993. He was the host of Feagler & Friends, a weekly half-hour discussion program on WVIZ until 2013.

Feagler retired from The Plain Dealer with his last column published on Sunday, January 4, 2009. He retired from WVIZ in September 2013.

He died July 1, 2018, in Cleveland, Ohio.

== Awards and honors ==
Feagler received the Peabody Award (1991), the DuPont-Columbia Award (1991), 23 local Emmy Awards and awards from United Press International and the Associated Press. Feagler was inducted into the Press Club of Cleveland Journalism Hall of Fame in 1994.

In 2019, Feagler received the Herrick Award from the Early Settlers Association of the Western Reserve for his contributions to Cleveland.

One of Feagler’s most popular newspaper pieces, "Christmas at Aunt Ida’s" was adapted into a stage production in 2006 at the Huntington Playhouse in Bay Village, Ohio. The play returned again in November 2007. The play returned for the last show at the Huntington Playhouse before it closed in December 2015. The playhouse was shut down by the Cleveland Metroparks due to safety concerns, unpaid water and sewer bills, and productions that had been paid for but never produced according to Brian Zimmerman who was a spokesperson for the Cleveland Metroparks. The executive director of the Huntington Playhouse, Tom Meyrose chose not to respond to the statements made by the Cleveland Metroparks.

Many of Feagler’s favorite columns have been published as collections, including "Feagler's Cleveland" and "Did You Read Feagler Today?"

== Bibliography ==
- Feagler’s Cleveland (1996)
- “Did You Read Feagler Today?” (1998)
- “I know I’m not supposed to say this . . . But I’ll say it anyway" (2001)
- Is it Just Me? (2005)
