= WGTE-TV =

Television station in Toledo, Ohio

- Toledo, Ohio; United States
- Channels: Digital: 29 (UHF); Virtual: 30
- Branding: WGTE

Programming
- Affiliations: 30.1: PBS; for others, see § Subchannels

Ownership
- Owner: Public Broadcasting Foundation of Northwest Ohio
- Sister stations: WGTE-FM

History
- Founded: October 10, 1960
- Former channel numbers: Analog: 30 (UHF, 1960–2009)
- Former affiliations: NET (1960–1970)
- Call sign meaning: Greater Toledo Educational Television

Technical information
- Licensing authority: FCC
- Facility ID: 66285
- ERP: 49.5 kW
- HAAT: 313.6 m (1,028.9 ft)
- Transmitter coordinates: 41°39′26″N 83°25′55″W

Links
- Public license information: Public file; LMS
- Website: www.wgte.org

WGTE-TV (channel 30) is a PBS member television station in Toledo, Ohio, United States. It is owned by the Public Broadcasting Foundation of Northwest Ohio alongside NPR member WGTE-FM (91.3). The two stations share studios on South Detroit Avenue in Toledo; WGTE-TV's transmitter is located on Corduroy Road in Oregon, Ohio.

== History ==
WGTE began in 1953 as a low-power television station on the University of Toledo campus, with a broadcast antenna in the belltower of University Hall. It began regular operations in 1959, receiving a full license on October 10, 1960, broadcasting in 100-watts.

WGTE has been digital-only since February 17, 2009.

In 2017, WGTE announced that it will not have to make any changes as a result of the spectrum auction, and will be allowed to remain on UHF 29. WGTE plans to broadcast in ATSC 3.0 in the future, and there are plans to broadcast in 4K Ultra HD, support mobile television, support 3D broadcasting, and more technological advances.

== Subchannels ==
The station's digital signal is multiplexed:

Subchannels of WGTE-TV
Subchannel	Res.	Short name	Programming
30.1	1080i	WGTE-HD	PBS
30.2	1080i	WGTE-Ki	PBS Kids
30.3	480i	WGTE-Cr	Create
30.4	480i	WGTE-CN	Ohio Channel

== Signal coverage ==
WGTE can be received in quite a large part of the Detroit area; its over-the-air signal reaches far into Detroit's southern inner-ring suburbs. The station has long claimed southeastern Michigan as part of its primary coverage area and even airs some Michigan-related programming.

=== Over-the-air coverage ===
WGTE's over the air signal reaches as far north as Taylor, Michigan, as far south as Findlay, Ohio, as far east as Sandusky, Ohio, and as far west as Wauseon, Ohio. The station's signal radius to the north is significantly reduced due to co-channel interference from CIII-DT-29 in Sarnia, Ontario, which also broadcasts on channel 29. That station however, is moving to channel 35. Coverage of WGTE should extend to Hamtramck, Michigan.

=== Cable coverage ===
WGTE is carried on most cable systems in northwestern Ohio. In addition, the station and all of its subchannels are available on Comcast in Melvindale, Ann Arbor and Lenawee County, Michigan, as well as on Wyandotte Municipal Cable and Buckeye Cable in the Toledo area and in the areas of Michigan where Buckeye is available. The station has not been carried on any cable systems in Canada (specifically Windsor and Essex County, Ontario) since the late 1980s.
