= 2001 in radio =

The year 2001 in radio involved some significant events.

== Events ==
- January - KQMQ/Honolulu flips from Rhythmic CHR to Rhythmic AC
- January 5 - Hot AC-formatted WZTR/Louisville flips to Top 40/CHR as WZKF, "Kiss FM."
- January 12 - WUBT flips to Top 40, branded as "Kiss 103.5" (WKSC-FM) in Chicago.
- January 26 - Long-time Top 40/CHR outlet KKOB-FM/Albuquerque flips to All-80s Hits
- January 29 - The 80s Channel WXXY and WWYX/Chicago (now WPNA-FM) becomes Viva 103.1
- February - Rhythmic oldies-formatted KKME/Modesto flips to active rock
- February 2 - Country-formatted WOGY/Memphis flips to Modern AC as WMBZ, "The Buzz."
- March - Rhythmic oldies-formatted WBUF/Buffalo flips to rock
- April 2 - WJMO/Washington, D.C., ends its urban oldies format and begins stunting as Survivor Radio, based on the CBS TV series, Survivor.
- April 6 - Survivor Radio stunt ends, and WJMO flips to CHR as Hot 99.5 (WIHT). "Survivor", by Destiny's Child, was the first song played on Hot 99.5.
- May 7 - CHUM Radio's "The Team" syndicated sports service debuts in Canada at 3 PM. With this, it brought an end to the oldies format on 1050 CHUM/Toronto after 11 years, and 44 years as a music station.
- May 26 - Essex-based pirate station 'Premier FM' begins broadcasting on 88.3FM from Southend-on-Sea, Essex, UK.
- May 28 - KRBV (100.3) in Dallas, TX changes its branding from "Hot 100" to "Wild 100" while maintaining its Top 40 format.
- June 15 - Bruce Williams leaves Westwood One to join the IDT-owned Talk America Radio Network; his departure effectively ended what was originally the NBC Talknet service.
- June 18 - KFME 105.1 in Kansas City signs on with an 80's intensive hot AC format as "E-1051.fm." The license-to-cover was accepted for filing quickly, but not granted for several years because a competitor raised concerns that the station didn't cover its city of license, Garden City, MO.
- July 3 - In Northeast Ohio, a complex exchange involving seven radio stations in Greater Cleveland and the Akron and the Canton metropolitan areas occurs between Clear Channel Communications, Salem Communications and WCLV (95.5 FM) owner Radio Seaway. Although generally reported as a "frequency swap", in reality these seven radio stations mostly trade callsigns along with their respective formats and staffs, all to facilitate the transfers of ownership of four of the seven stations:
  - WAKS (104.9 FM), licensed to Lorain, Ohio, aired a contemporary hit radio format. WAKS was sold by Clear Channel to Radio Seaway, the callsign changed to WCLV-FM and the format changed to classical music.
  - WCLV (95.5 FM), licensed to Cleveland, Ohio, aired a classical music format. WCLV was sold by Radio Seaway to Salem, the callsign changed to WFHM-FM and the format changed to Christian contemporary.
  - WHK (1420 AM), licensed to Cleveland, Ohio, aired a religious format. WHK was sold by Salem to Radio Seaway, the callsign changed to WCLV and format the changed to adult standards assuming the intellectual property of WRMR, which Radio Seaway purchased in a separate transaction.
  - WHK-FM (98.1 FM), licensed to Canton, Ohio, fully simulcast WHK's religious format. WHK-FM was sold by Salem to Clear Channel, the callsign changed to WKDD and the format changed to adult contemporary.
  - WKDD (96.5 FM), licensed to Akron, Ohio, aired an adult contemporary format. WKDD was retained by Clear Channel, the callsign changed to WAKS and the format changed to contemporary hit radio.
  - WKNR (1220 AM), licensed to Cleveland, Ohio, aired a sports format. WKNR was retained by Salem, the callsign changed to WHK and the format changed to religious.
  - WRMR (850 AM), licensed to Cleveland, Ohio, aired an adult standards format. WRMR was retained by Salem, the callsign changed to WKNR and the format changed to sports.
- July 27 - Energy FM starts broadcasting in the Isle of Man, it is only the second radio station ever to be legally broadcast on the Island. Other illegal stations known to have operated have been Radio Caroline and Toxic 103FM.
- August 9 - Saying that "the rusty pipes are being renewed... I'm so eager to return," Paul Harvey returned to the air for one day after suffering a severe case of laryngitis; he had been sidelined since May while undergoing treatment at the Mayo Clinic. Gil Gross and Sam Donaldson were the chief fill-in hosts used during this time. Harvey returned to full-time duty on August 19.
- September - Classic rock-formatted WZUU/Kalamazoo flips to active rock
- September 2 - WEVD 1050-AM in New York is leased out by owner The Jewish Daily Forward to Disney/ABC. The locally based talk format, including hosts Alan Colmes, Ed Koch and Bill Mazer is dropped in favor of ESPN Radio programming (and eventually becomes ESPN's flagship station, WEPN). Nine days later, the station simulcasts future sister station WABC for several weeks.
- September 10 - The Sean Hannity Show enters national syndication from ABC Radio.
- September 11 - Thousands of radio stations interrupt regularly scheduled programming starting at or around 8:50 a.m. EST (13.50 GMT) to cover the September 11 terrorist attacks in New York, Washington, D.C., and Shanksville, Pennsylvania, from multitudes of sources.
- September 11 - In addition to the 2,754 fatalities in New York City, the September 11 attacks resulted the destruction of the transmission mast atop One World Trade Center, killing six engineers and silencing WKCR, WPAT-FM, WNYC-FM and WKTU, in addition to all nine major television stations, and the studio-transmitter link for WNYC (AM). WKTU had a backup transmitter atop the Conde Nast Building at Four Times Square that was immediately activated. Later that morning, all of New York's radio outlets (including the music outlets) preempt programming for nonstop coverage of the September 11 attacks until the end of the month. WNYC Radio's studio buildings in the Municipal Building were evacuated and relocated to NPR's Manhattan facilities, with WNYE arranging to carry WNYC-FM's programming on a full-time basis. While WNYC (AM)'s transmitter was on the whole time, programming would return later that afternoon with a backup STL dish sent to their transmitter site, which would relay an ISDN feed of WNYC sent via satellite from NPR's Washington facility. WPAT returned to the air that Thursday on the Empire State Building's transmission mast, and WKCR was reactivated from their Columbia University campus. (All of the TV stations would utilize the historic Armstrong Tower - a landmark in the history of FM broadcasting - as early as that Wednesday.)
- November - KBOB-FM (104.9 FM) in Davenport, Iowa is rebranded "Great Country 105" and adopts a classic country format.
- December 31 - Cox Communications flips the format and call letters of Classical radio station WTMI/Miami, Florida to Dance Music as WPYM ("Party 93.1, South Florida's Pure Dance Channel"). The news would make headlines in the trades and in the Dance Music community. The station would last three years and three months.

== Debuts ==
- The 2 Live Stews debut on WQXI in Atlanta, Georgia
- March 1 - 89 DMZ (owned by Intercontinental Broadcasting Corporation) renamed as Wave 89.1 (owned by Blockbuster Broadcasting System) begins broadcast in the Philippines.
- June 25 - The Laura Ingraham Show debuts on Westwood One, assuming the 7:00 p.m. - 10:00 p.m. slot previously held by Bruce Williams (see events).
- September 25 - XM Satellite Radio launches as North America's first satellite radio service with new channels.
- Kari Steele moves from KOST to spend 10 years at sister station KBIG before returning in to the station in 2011.

== Closings ==
- Sports Fan Radio Network dismisses The Fabulous Sports Babe in January, network folds in May.
- BBC Radio 2 in the U.K. closes topical radio comedy sketch show The News Huddlines starring comedian Roy Hudd with a Christmas special. First broadcast in 1975, it is British radio's longest-running audience comedy.

== Deaths ==
- January 4: Les Brown, 90, American jazz bandleader
- January 6: Gene Taylor, 53, American media personality
- March 12: Morton Downey, Jr., 68, controversial and influential American television talk show host of the 1980s who pioneered the "trash talk show" format
- March 27: Irene Thomas, 80, British radio quiz show player
- April 27: Charlie Applewhite, 68, American singer and radio host
- May 11: Douglas Adams, English-born scriptwriter
- May 12: Perry Como, 88, American crooner and radio personality
- September 4: Hank the Angry Drunken Dwarf, 39, American radio personality and actor
- September 5: Cawood Ledford, 75, American play-by-play radio sportscaster (Kentucky Wildcats)
- September 13: Charles Régnier, 87, German actor, director, radio actor and translator
- October 22: Cliff Adams, 77, English musician and bandleader
- November 5: Milton William Cooper, 58, American conspiracy theorist and shortwave radio host
