= WKLV =

WKLV may refer to any of the following radio stations:

- WKLV (AM) (1440 kHz), a radio station in Blackstone, Virginia
- WKLV-FM (95.5 MHz), a radio station in Cleveland, Ohio
- WARW (FM) (96.7 MHz), a radio station in Port Chester, New York, which held the call sign WKLV-FM from 2011 to 2019
- WLBJ (93.5 MHz), a radio station in Butler, Alabama, which held the call sign WKLV-FM from 2019 to 2025
