= WCPN =

Public radio station in Lorain, Ohio

Simulcast of WKSU, Kent, OH
- Lorain, Ohio; United States
- Broadcast area: Greater Cleveland; Northeast Ohio
- Frequency: 104.9 MHz (HD Radio)
- Branding: WKSU Ideastream Public Media

Programming
- Language: English
- Format: Public radio and talk
- Subchannels: HD2: Folk music; HD3: Classical (WCLV); HD4: Public radio
- Affiliations: APM; BBC World Service; NPR; PRX

Ownership
- Owner: Ideastream; (Radio Seaway, Inc.)
- Sister stations: WCLV; WCSB; WKSU; WVIZ

History
- First air date: July 25, 1975
- Former call signs: WZLE (1975–1999); WMTX (1999); WAKS (1999–2001); WCLV-FM (2001–2003); WCLV (2003–2022)
- Call sign meaning: "Cleveland Public Network"

Technical information
- Licensing authority: FCC
- Facility ID: 70109
- Class: A
- ERP: 6,000 watts
- HAAT: 97.41 meters (320 ft)
- Transmitter coordinates: 41°28′32.2″N 81°59′23.5″W

Links
- Public license information: Public file; LMS
- Webcast: Listen live; Listen live (HD2); Listen live (HD3); Listen live (HD4)
- Website: www.wksu.org

WCPN (104.9 FM) is a non-commercial educational radio station licensed to Lorain, Ohio, United States, featuring a public radio format as a repeater of Kent–licensed WKSU. Owned by Ideastream Public Media, the station serves the western portion of Greater Cleveland and parts of surrounding Northeast Ohio. By virtue of WKSU, studios are located at Playhouse Square in Downtown Cleveland, while WCPN's transmitter resides in the Cleveland suburb of Avon. In addition to a standard analog transmission, WCPN broadcasts over four HD Radio channels and streams online.

Signing on in 1975 under the WZLE call sign, the station originally focused on Lorain County with a full-service format of local news and easy listening music dubbed "mellow gold". A 1983 sale of WZLE to a local non-profit Christian group saw the station switch to Christian radio programming, eventually focusing on contemporary Christian music by the early 1990s. Jacor's purchase of WZLE in 1998 resulted in a format change the following year to contemporary hit radio as "KISS 104.9", the first home of WAKS. A complex seven-station asset swap involving Jacor's successor company Clear Channel, Salem Communications and WCLV (95.5 FM) owner Radio Seaway on July 3, 2001, resulted in 104.9 FM becoming the second home of WCLV and its classical music format. Converted to non-commercial status and donated to Ideastream in 2013, WCLV's programming and call letters moved to 90.3 FM on March 28, 2022; in turn, this station became a full-power satellite of co-managed WKSU, bearing the WCPN calls.

== History ==
=== WZLE ===
The current 104.9 FM license was borne out of a contested bidding process that lasted five years. Lake Erie Broadcasting, a group headed by Harold E. "Gene" Sens (vice president/general manager for Sandusky's WLEC and a staffer for that station since 1960) filed paperwork with the Federal Communications Commission (FCC) on December 6, 1969. Lorain Community Broadcasting, owners of WLRO (1380 AM), filed a competing application at the same time, prompting an FCC comparative hearing on April 14, 1971. The FCC ruled in favor of Sens's group, and after losing on appeal to an FCC review board, Lorain Community withdrew their bid on November 6, 1974. Taking the WZLE calls and committing to studios at the Sheffield Shopping Center and a 280-foot (85 m) tower on an adjacent road, both in Sheffield Township, Sens promised the station would feature a full-service format with music "geared for 'adults and young adults". Sens relinquished his WLEC duties several weeks prior to WZLE's launch.

WZLE took to the air at 1 p.m. on July 25, 1975, with a broadcast schedule running from 5:25 a.m. to midnight. Eventual Morning Journal columnist Richard J. Osborne was WZLE's news director and retrospectively described the format as big band-oriented and meant for older audience; he mused, "back then, being news director meant being the news department." Sports director Bruce Johnson called the station "mellow gold" with an emphasis on easy listening. Even though the station signed off at midnight daily, WZLE officials promised the station would remain on-air in the event of any community emergency. High school sports coverage became a regular feature, with WZLE broadcasting Lorain Catholic High School's 1976 state basketball championship. Veteran broadcaster Jeff Baxter was the station's initial program director, while future Cleveland broadcaster Bob Tayek briefly worked as a newscaster. Former WJKW-TV news anchor Jim Hale joined WZLE as an announcer and newscaster on November 23, 1977. By 1978, WZLE broadcast around-the-clock.

Sens considered WZLE's community service commitments to be "of utmost importance in my mind... we're not just a Lorain station, but our main obligation is to Lorain and Elyria residents". Public service fare even included a Sunday night discussion show devoted to senior citizens, one of the first of its kind in the country. The station hired former WOBL personality Scott Miller for evenings on March 17, 1980, after a publicity stunt where he held himself "hostage" in the WOBL studio to relate with the hostages at the U.S. embassy in Iran. The stunt lasted for 50 days; WOBL owner Harry Wilbur fired Miller afterwards, while the FCC investigated him for possible improprieties with soliciting money on-air. Miller's show broke format as he focused on country music and talk causing WZLE to drop their ongoing high school basketball playoff coverage as it conflicted with his show. By that July, area sportscaster Jim Allen Popiel moved his daily high school sports show from WLRO to WZLE. Coinciding with the changes, WZLE rebranded as "Z-105" while retaining the "mellow gold" descriptor. By the fall of 1982, WOBL ceased high school sports coverage due to an ongoing recession impacting WOBL's audience more than WZLE or WEOL.

On April 15, 1983, WZLE was purchased by the Lorain Christian Broadcasting Company for $850,000 (equivalent to $2.75 million in 2025). Lorain Christian Broadcasting was headed by the Rev. Norfleet Jones, an area minister and syndicated radio host; his group intended to build a station before learning Sens was interested in selling WZLE. While Jones initially suggested little to no changes for the station, after the sale closed, WZLE changed format to Christian radio as "Victory 105" on June 16, 1983, only retaining the station's bookkeeper. WZLE's lineup featured a mixture of middle-of-the-road Christian music along with national preachers including Dr. James Dobson, Dr. Charles Swindoll and Marlin Maddoux. Among the programs added was The Hour of Comfort with Rev. Daniel Buser, which had recently been dropped from WEOL's schedule. Len Howser joined the station as operations manager and morning host and attracted attention when leading a campaign along with the station protesting the 1988 religious drama The Last Temptation of Christ due to its "morally and ethically wrong" content.

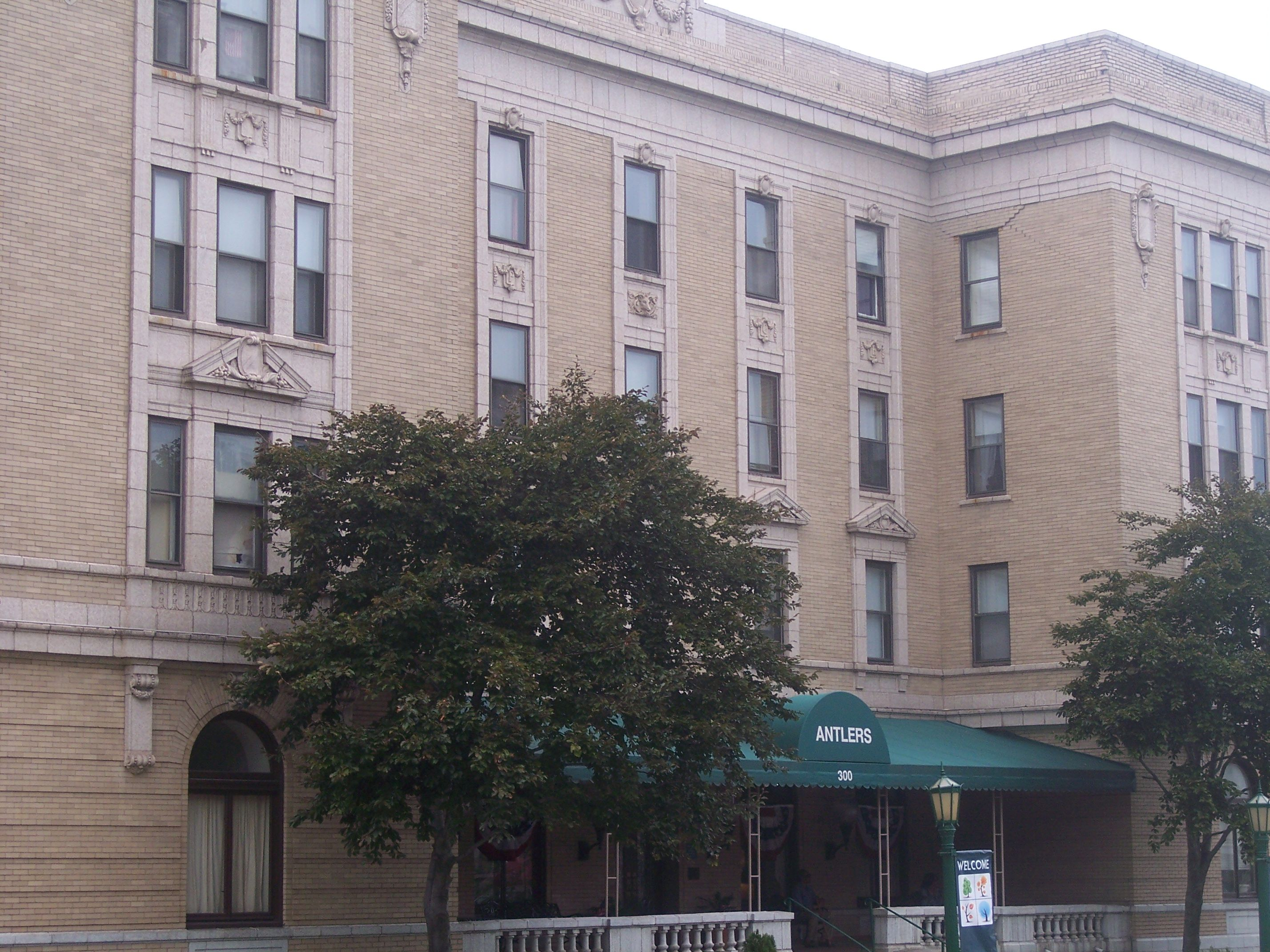
The Antlers Hotel in Lorain, Ohio, housed WZLE's studios in the 1990s.

WZLE was sold to Cincinnati-based Victory Radio in July 1988 for $820,000 (equivalent to $2.23 million in 2025); as part of the deal, Lorain Christian Broadcasting entered into a non-compete agreement and group head Johnny Wade Sloan, who took over for Jones, became a consultant for Victory for five years. Victory Radio purchased WRKG (the former WLRO) from a group headed by real estate developer Jon R. Veard the following year. When that purchase was approved, WZLE moved to WRKG's facilities at the Antlers Hotel in Lorain's downtown that Veard also owned, though Victory Radio head Vernon Baldwin also considered building a new facility for both stations. WRKG also changed format from adult standards to a mixture of southern gospel and Hispanic programming to align themselves further with WZLE. The station's satellite dish was heavily damaged by vandals twice during a nine-month span in 1991; Howser suggested the vandalism was possibly caused by people opposed to Maddoux's satellite-delivered program Point of View and his outspoken support for Supreme Court nominee Clarence Thomas.

Under Victory ownership, a new 450-foot (140 m) tower was activated in early 1991, 50 percent taller than the prior tower and extending the station's signal range by 8–10 miles (13–16 km); management claimed this tower was the tallest in the county, though it was in reality 49 feet shorter than WNWV's 499-foot (152 m) mast. While WZLE retained some locally sourced church programming, the format was adjusted to contemporary Christian as the format was beginning to find mainstream appeal. WZLE also carried several local specialty programs. Overnights featured gospel-oriented hip hop first hosted by born-again Christian "Brother Lou" Acosta and later by community volunteer Jerome G. "J The Gospel Kid" Williams. John Palmer hosted Planet Palmer, a Saturday night program devoted to harder-edged Christian rock. High school sports coverage continued to be featured, particularly with the Southwestern Conference. A Friday night sports talk show hosted by former Cleveland Brown punter Bryan Wagner was added in 1996. Len Howser added Patty Sutter and Palmer as co-hosts for a full-service morning show, using it as a way to introduce the Christian contemporary format to listeners. Howser referred to the station's overall success in Lorain County as a "killer phenomenon".

Rumors emerged in 1997 that Salem Communications, a Christian-based broadcast chain which had purchased both WHK and WCCD in the region, showed interest in acquiring WZLE. Ultimately, the station was sold to Jacor (in the process of being acquired by Clear Channel Communications) on December 22, 1998, joining a Greater Cleveland cluster of four FM stations and one AM station. After the deal closed, Jacor management committed to keeping the Christian format in place. Still, rumors persisted of a format change, possibly to country music, while Howser said, "... they (Jacor) gave me the reins to treat the station as my own and told me to use good judgement."

=== WAKS ===
When we would meet people in public, it was like we had spent the morning together in the same room talking the whole morning. As I talk with listeners since we went off the air, I sense a deep void. This was something people identified with. It brought something positive, hope-filled and faith-filled into their lives.

— Len Howser, former WZLE personality

Precipitated by WZJM (92.3 FM)'s format change earlier in the month from contemporary hit radio (CHR) to rhythmic oldies under the "Jammin' Oldies" banner, WZLE switched formats on May 21, 1999, to CHR as "KISS 104.9". WZLE's airstaff was notified of the switch the day beforehand, with automated Christian music playing until the overnight hours. Greg Ausham, who assumed operation manager duties for WZLE, cited WZJM's format change and WZLE's small—albeit loyal—listener base as the impetus for the change. One displaced listener recounted shock tuning her car radio to WZLE along with her children and hearing Prince's "Erotic City", telling the Morning Journal, "I feel cheated, ripped off and heartbroken... I'm just devastated." Former WZLE personality John Palmer fielded 200 phone calls from affected listeners on the day of the format switch. One employee answering the station's office phone commented to the Journal, "it's big city radio now". A contest conducted shortly after the switch went awry when 200 Cedar Point tickets promised to winners went missing; as multiple office keys at the Antlers facilities were unaccounted for, sabotage among former employees was implied. WZLE's studios were ultimately moved to Downtown Cleveland in the Tower City Center's Skylight Office Tower, already housing co-owned WMMS and WMVX, and the playlist was assisted in part from WNCI in Columbus.

WZLE's format change took place several days after WENZ relaunched as "KISS 107.9" with a mainstream urban format, but Clear Channel filed a cease and desist letter against WENZ owner Radio One as Clear Channel claimed ownership of the "KISS-FM" brand as a trademark in Ohio, a charge Radio One's chief operating officer disputed. By September 1999, WENZ re-branded as "Z-107.9" by its own volition, allowing Clear Channel to have full ownership of the brand. WZLE's call sign accordingly changed to WAKS on September 17, 1999, taking calls recently abandoned in Tampa, Florida, by the current WMTX. While "KISS 104.9" was originally fully automated (and, along with WENZ, was described by Plain Dealer critic Tom Feran as "little more than cyberstations programmed from out of town"), an airstaff was gradually assembled. Dan Mason, Jr. was hired as program director and afternoon host in early November 1999; Mason was the son of eventual CBS Radio executive Dan Mason. Mike Kasper was added in March 2000 as music director and evening host. Mornings were hosted by KIIS-FM afternoon host Sean Valentine via voice-tracking with the majority of segments recorded from his KIIS show; this practice was used at other Clear Channel-owned "KISS-FM" stations.

Despite WAKS's limited signal, the station showed immediate promise: the Summer 1999 Arbitron Arbitrends showed the station's ratings tripled from the previous fall, and the full Arbitron report showed WAKS placing in the Top 10 with the 18–34 demographic. Clear Channel management expressed hopes of increasing the station's coverage area, including possible increases in power and a transmitter move, but acknowledged that first-adjacent station WKKY in Geneva would present a limitation. Paperwork was filed in March 2000 to move WAKS to a 350-foot (110 m) tower in Avon, along with a power increase to 6,000 watts. The FCC granted a construction permit for the move on July 3, 2000.

When Clear Channel merged into AMFM, Inc. on August 25, 2000, the company was given six months by federal regulators to address their ownership of WAKS, which exceeded limits on revenue concentration in the Cleveland market.

=== 2001 "frequency swap" ===
We could have sold (WCLV (95.5 FM)) for millions and millions and millions and millions of dollars... (but) we feel that the radio station is very important to the community. It contributes to the quality of life. It's a major conduit for the arts organizations to their constituencies.

— Robert Conrad

WAKS was one of seven Northeast Ohio radio stations involved in a complex asset swap between Clear Channel and two other radio companies. WCLV (95.5 FM) parent Radio Seaway reached an agreement to donate WCLV's assets to a nonprofit foundation on November 1, 2000; (Note: When the asset swap was announced, the 95.5 FM license was estimated at $45 million (equivalent to $84.1 million in 2025), while the 104.9 FM license was valued at $8 million (equivalent to $15 million in 2025).) to finance this deal, Radio Seaway sold the 95.5 FM license to Salem Communications and concurrently purchased the licenses for WAKS from Clear Channel and WHK (1420 AM) from Salem, while Clear Channel also purchased the license for Canton's WHK-FM (98.1) from Salem. WCLV co-founder/president Robert Conrad and Radio Seaway partner Rich Marschner initiated the deal to preserve WCLV's classical format from being subsumed by mass consolidation in the industry; they negotiated between both radio chains for nearly two years. With the divestment of the 104.9 FM license, Clear Channel announced WAKS's CHR format and call letters would transfer to the Akron–licensed 96.5 FM facility, which was adult contemporary-formatted WKDD; in turn, WKDD's format and calls would move to the 98.1 FM facility. Clear Channel acquired WKDD and WTOU in a trade with Barnstable Broadcasting to complete the AMFM, Inc. merger; after the trade was finalized, WKDD was speculated on as a potential WAKS simulcast.

Station logo following the 2001 frequency change

Radio Seaway's original plans were to use the 1420 AM facility as an outright simulcast of WCLV-FM, addressing the 104.9 FM license's technical limitations. Said plans were changed, however, when Salem announced that WHK's format and call letters would move from 1420 AM to 1220 AM and WKNR's sports format and call letters would move from 1220 AM to 850 AM, effectively forcing WRMR and its adult standards format off the air. Following a substantial outcry from WRMR listeners, which as a station had a core demographic of 65 and older and ranked near the bottom tier in the 25–54 demographic, Radio Seaway agreed on May 31, 2001, to acquire WRMR's intellectual property—reported on as "the WRMR format" but consisting of the station's music library and some equipment—for an undisclosed fee and placed the format on 1420 AM with the WCLV (AM) call sign. WCLV subsequently arranged a partial simulcast for 104.9 FM with Painesville's WBKC. The asset deals behind this "frequency swap" were all consummated on July 3, 2001, with WAKS changing format from CHR to classical and call sign to WCLV-FM, bringing over the former WCLV (95.5 FM)'s format intact and retaining all on- and off-air staff. The "new" WCLV-FM also continued production of 27 programs nationally syndicated by Radio Seaway, including Cleveland Orchestra radio broadcasts.

=== WCLV ===
When the Browns left town (in 1996), so what? But if WCLV had left, that would have been a great blow to me.

— Frank Gerklak, longtime WCLV listener after the move to 104.9 FM

The non-profit organization established to operate WCLV-FM—the WCLV Foundation—was modeled in part on the foundation established after Patsy Bullitt Collins divested KING-FM to a consortium consisting of the Seattle Symphony, Seattle Opera and ArtsFund in 1994. The structure of the WCLV Foundation allowed WCLV to continue operating with a classical format and use its "excess profits" to fund local arts organizations: the Cleveland Orchestra, the Cleveland Institute of Music, the Cleveland Museum of Art, the Cleveland Play House, and The Cleveland Foundation. Cleveland Foundation president Steven Minter praised the WCLV Foundation as "generous and farsighted" and pledged to use any annual proceeds for future grant distribution. On November 1, 2001, Radio Seaway donated WCLV-FM's license to the Foundation but handled day-to-day operations, while retaining and operating WCLV (AM) outright. Maintaining the adult standards format, the AM outlet was renamed WRMR on January 1, 2003, and then repurchased by Salem Communications on July 7, 2004, for $10 million.

Grade A signal contours for 104.9 FM (blue), located in Avon, and 95.5 FM (red), located in Warrensville Heights.

The move of WCLV's format and call letters to 104.9 FM came at the expense of listeners in Summit County, particularly in Akron and Kent, that were unable to reliably pick up the new signal. One disappointed listener from Cuyahoga Falls told the Akron Beacon Journal, "I love WCLV, I just feel like the announcers are members of my family." Conrad, who emceed a Cleveland Orchestra concert at Blossom Music Center shortly after the switch, ended up addressing the new signal's shortcomings and said, "we made some sacrifices for the perpetuation of the format". WKSU, which continued to feature a combined public radio and classical format, began advertising towards affected listeners particularly in areas where WCLV-FM's signal was the weakest, but otherwise considered WCLV a "kindred spirit".

WCLV's ratings dropped by 20 percent the year following the switch, but advertising revenue remained stable even with challenges related to the September 11 attacks. A Plain Dealer review of the Tivoli Audio PAL elicited disagreement from readers disappointed in the radio as they were still unable to reliably tune in to WCLV's signal, even with the PAL's sensitive tuner. WCLV began HD Radio broadcasts on August 14, 2003, shortly before a cascading failure of the electrical grid in the Midwest and Northeast marred the debut; at the time, WCLV was the second Cleveland-market radio station and only the third U.S. radio station with a classical format to adopt the standard. The partial simulcast with WBKC ended on October 17, 2006, after owner D&E Communications converted WBKC into a gospel music format under the WABQ call sign, assuming the prior identity of a prior WABQ divested several weeks earlier.

Jacqueline Gerber joined WCLV as morning host in the spring of 2001, prior to the frequency move. In an interview with the Springfield State Journal-Register, Gerber described WCLV as a mixture of old and new technology, noting, "we still have turntables... we still have reel-to-reel tape, we still have single-edge razor blades lying around the control room." Gerber's arrival accentuated an airstaff with significant continuity: music director John Simna had been with WCLV since 1973 and midday host Mark Satola since 1977. Bill O'Connell was named as the second program director in station history in 1998, succeeding Conrad, then became afternoon host in May 2001 following Tony Bianchi's retirement from WCLV after 37 years on air. Hugh Danaceau, who was the station's news director since 1981, continued in that capacity until his death on October 26, 2003. Bill Rudman's musical theater-themed Footlight Parade had been a WCLV program since May 1983; during Radio Seaway's ownership of 1420 AM, Rudman hosted a Saturday afternoon program on that station devoted to "classic American song". The Black Arts, a weekly series on contributions to fine arts, classical music and jazz by African Americans hosted by A. Grace Lee Mims, launched on WCLV in 1976 and aired continuously until Mims's death in October 2019.

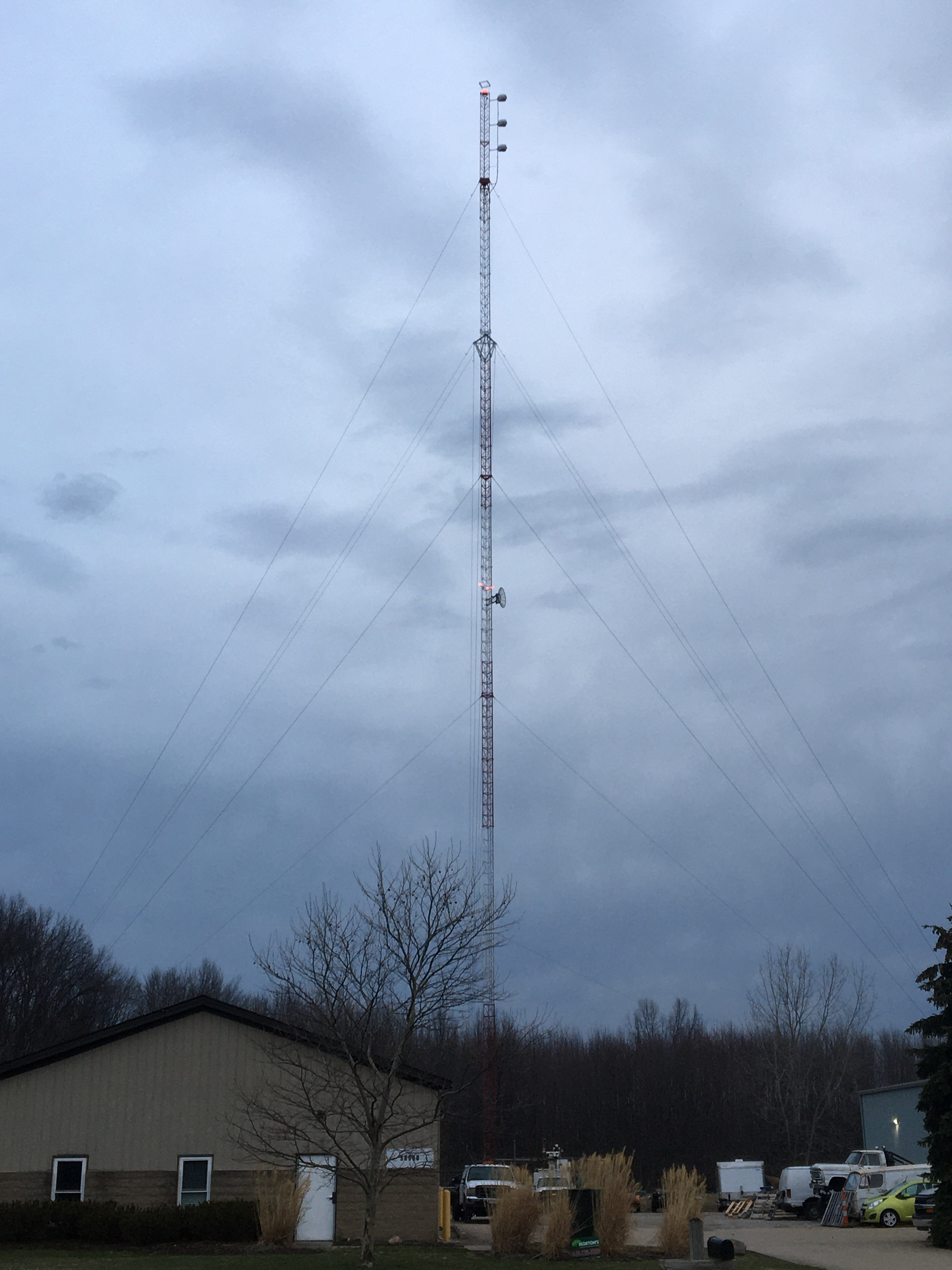
The current 104.9 FM transmitter mast located in Avon, Ohio

Two of WCLV's signature evening programs—Symphony at Seven and Heinen's Concert Hall—also carried over to 104.9 FM. While Concert Hall was discontinued in 2003, Symphony at Seven remains on the schedule to the present day, with KeyBank (through predecessors Society Bank and Cleveland Trust) serving as the program's sole sponsor throughout its entire history. Adventures in Good Music, which WCLV syndicated internationally since March 22, 1970, remained on the schedule until June 29, 2007, but ended production four years earlier; the program continued to be among WCLV's highest-rated when host Karl Haas died in 2005. Essential Classics, another program of recorded music, replaced Adventures in Good Music on the WCLV schedule. Beau Coup keyboardist Dennis Lewin hosted Turning You onto Classical Music on WCLV from 2008 to 2018.

WCLV's conversion into non-commercial status occurred over the span of two years. WCLV first announced on August 10, 2010, its move from their long-time "Radio Ranch" studios in Warrensville Heights to the Idea Center at Playhouse Square in Downtown Cleveland, home to area PBS member WVIZ and area NPR member WCPN; the station's transmitter site would remain in Avon. The move occurred in December 2010. Radio Seaway announced it would donate WCLV to WVIZ and WCPN's parent Ideastream on May 4, 2011, with Cleveland Classical Radio (formerly the WCLV Foundation) continuing to operate the station until November 1, 2012, the 50th anniversary of the original WCLV (95.5 FM)'s launch. Ideastream was one of the initial backing partners behind the WCLV Foundation at its 2000 establishment. Commercial operation continued until January 1, 2013, when the station joined WVIZ and WCPN in operating as a non-commercial public radio station, fully integrating it into the public media group. From 2001 through 2012, WCLV was one of the few remaining commercially operated classical music radio stations in the United States.

=== WKSU repeater ===
Ideastream Public Media and Kent State University's board of trustees entered into a public service operating agreement with the university's WKSU on September 15, 2021. This agreement had its genesis in a $100,000 Corporation for Public Broadcasting grant jointly awarded to WKSU and Ideastream on September 1, 2020, to help expand public media service in Northeast Ohio and encourage collaboration between both entities. As part of the agreement, Ideastream took over the day-to-day operations of WKSU and all its respective translators and repeaters on October 1, 2021, retaining all of WKSU's employees.

On March 28, 2022, WCLV changed calls to WCPN and became a WKSU repeater for Lorain County and the western portion of Greater Cleveland, WCPN changed calls to WCLV and format to classical music, and WKSU became Northeast Ohio's lead NPR station employing both WCPN and WKSU's off- and on-air staffs. The addition of 104.9 FM to WKSU's repeater network—with a potential audience of 3.6 million people and 22-county coverage area—gave WKSU the largest collective footprint for an FM radio station in Ohio, while WCLV's potential audience at 90.3 FM was estimated to have increased by as many as one million people restoring the classical format on a full-market FM signal since the 2001 asset swap.

== Programming ==
WCPN operates as a full-time simulcast of WKSU. Additionally, WCPN rebroadcasts WKSU's four digital subchannels using the proprietary HD Radio standard:

- WCPN-HD1 is a simulcast of WCPN's analog feed.
- WCPN-HD2 airs folk music from FolkAlley.com.
- WCPN-HD3 is a simulcast of WCLV's analog feed.
- WCPN-HD4 carries an alternate schedule of news and talk programming from NPR and the BBC World Service branded "News and More". Think and As It Happens air exclusively on this channel, along with Folk Alley and locally produced ethnic shows on Sunday nights.
