= WFHM =

WFHM may refer to:

- WVLT (AM), a radio station (1270 AM) licensed to serve Vineland, New Jersey, United States, which held the call sign WFHM from 1986 to 1990
- WHKZ, a radio station (1440 AM) licensed to serve Warren, Ohio, United States, which held the call sign WFHM in 2001
- WKLV-FM, a radio station (95.5 FM) licensed to serve Cleveland, Ohio, United States, which held the call sign WFHM-FM from 2001 to 2025
- WLBJ (FM), a radio station (93.5 FM) licensed to serve Butler, Alabama, United States, which held the call sign WFHM-FM from February 1, 2025, to April 22, 2025
