= WLBJ =

WLBJ may refer to:

- WLBJ-LP, a defunct low-power radio station (104.1 FM) formerly licensed to serve Fostoria, Ohio, United States
- WLBJ (Kentucky), a defunct radio station (1410 AM) formerly licensed to serve Bowling Green, Kentucky, United States
- WLRS (AM), a radio station (1570 AM) licensed to serve New Albany, Indiana, United States, which held the call sign WLBJ from 2003 to 2005
- WLBJ (Alabama), a radio station (93.5 FM) licensed to serve Butler, Alabama, United States.
