= USA Radio Network =

American radio network

- Type: Subsidiary
- Industry: Radio Broadcasting
- Founded: September 15, 1985; 40 years ago
- Founder: Marlin Maddoux
- Headquarters: United States
- Area served: United States
- Parent: Independent (1985–2008); Information Radio Network (2008–2014); Cross Platform Media (2014–2015); Liftable Media (2015–2018); Nevada Radio (2018–2021); Talk Media Network (2021-present)
- Website: usaradio.com

USA Radio Network is an American mass media company, specializing in 24/7 news coverage, long-form talk radio shows, produced and distributed with a generally conservative focus.

USA Radio Network produces and distributes 24-hour news, talk, information, opinion and entertainment radio programming to approximately 1,100 radio stations around the world on two full-time satellite channels and through various digital protocol systems.

USA Radio has no connection to Versant's USA Network.

== History ==
=== Founding ===
USA Radio Network was established in 1985 by Marlin Maddoux. Maddoux had hosted his own local conservative news talk program, Point of View, in Dallas since 1972. In 1982, the program began broadcasting nationwide on the Satellite Radio Network. Maddoux identified the need for a national news service for radio stations not served by the major networks. The newly chartered USA Radio Network went on the air with its first newscast via satellite on September 15, 1985. Maddoux died on March 4, 2004.

In 2008, USA Radio Network merged its corporate structure under Larry Bates of Memphis, Tennessee, with Information Radio Network. Programming on the two networks remaining separate. The combined company was known as IRN/USA Radio Network. The old IRN became IRN/USA-1, and the two existing USA Radio Network channels became channels 2 and 3. IRN/USA Radio Network went into receivership in 2013 due to the legal issues of its sister company First American Monetary Consultants. Cross Platform Media took over day-to-day management of the network under the direction of the courts until Cross Platform purchased it from receivership in September 2014.

=== Relaunch and ownership change ===
Cross Platform Media immediately removed the IRN moniker, shut down all of IRN's programming, and relaunched the original USA Radio Network brand as the first step in an revitalization program that included overhauling USA Radio News and rebuilding its programming lineup. Russ Jones stepped in as Senior Vice President and News Director to oversee the 24-hour news department.

On October 9, 2015, Liftable Media, a company that specializes in digital and social news websites, acquired USA Radio Networks from Cross Platform Media. On October 15, Liftable hired former nationally syndicated conservative talk show host Rusty Humphries as Senior Vice President of Programming.

Nevada Radio, LLC based in Washoe Valley, Nevada, acquired the network in 2018. It then severed ties with Humphries.

=== Adding shows ===
Daybreak USA is the network's long-running morning news magazine. The program was replaced by Doug Stephan's Good Day in June 2022.

Old-time radio broadcasts have been a staple of the network for many years with the broadcasts airing under the umbrella title "Classic Radio Theater."

The network is most recognized for its USA Radio News product, which offers top and bottom of hour newscasts to affiliate stations.

Mainstay programs of the network include Wayne Allyn Root, Ron Seggi Today, and USA Classic Radio Theater.

After CBS News Radio ceased operations on May 22, 2026 USA Radio News gained many of the former CBS affiliates for their top-of-hour news updates.
