= WHK (AM) =

Talk radio station in Cleveland, Ohio

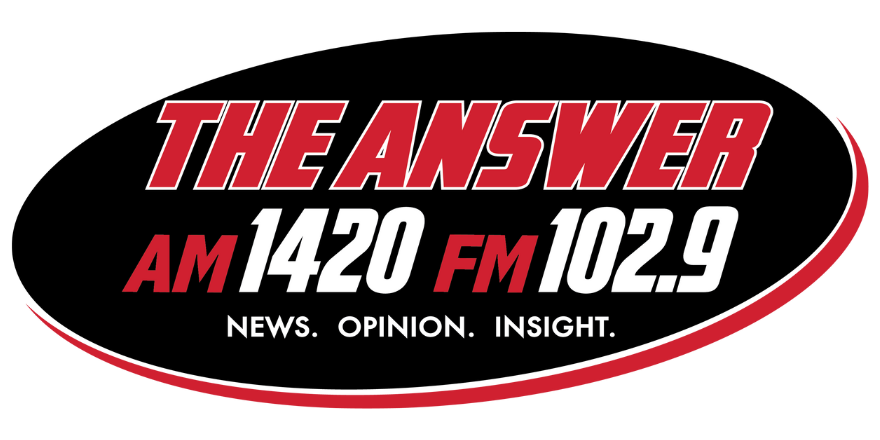
- Cleveland, Ohio; United States
- Broadcast area: Greater Cleveland
- Frequency: 1420 kHz
- Branding: AM 1420 The Answer

Programming
- Format: Conservative talk
- Affiliations: AccuWeather; Bloomberg Radio; Salem Radio Network; Townhall News; Westwood One

Ownership
- Owner: Salem Media Group; (Salem Communications Holding Corporation)
- Sister stations: WHKW

History
- Founded: August 26, 1921
- First air date: March 5, 1922
- Former call signs: WHK (1922–2001); WHKK (2001); WCLV (2001–2003); WRMR (2003–2005)
- Former frequencies: 833 kHz (1922–1923); 1060 kHz (1923–1925); 1100 kHz (1925–1927); 1130 kHz (1927–1928); 1390 kHz (1928–1941)
- Call sign meaning: None, randomly assigned

Technical information
- Licensing authority: FCC
- Facility ID: 72299
- Class: B
- Power: 5,000 watts (unlimited)
- Transmitter coordinates: 41°21′30.19″N 81°40′2.46″W
- Translator: 102.9 W275DF (Cleveland)

Links
- Public license information: Public file; LMS
- Webcast: Listen live
- Website: whkradio.com

WHK (1420 AM, "The Answer") is a commercial radio station licensed to Cleveland, Ohio, United States, carrying a conservative talk format. Owned by the Salem Media Group, the station serves both Greater Cleveland and the Northeast Ohio region as an affiliate for the Salem Radio Network. WHK's studios are currently located in the Cleveland suburb of Independence while the transmitter site resides in neighboring Seven Hills. In addition to a standard analog transmission, WHK is relayed over low-power Cleveland translator W273DG (102.9 FM) and is available online.

Formally established in 1922 but borne out of experimental broadcasts by founder Warren R. Cox, WHK was the first licensed radio station to broadcast in Ohio and is the 15th oldest station still broadcasting in the United States. Operated by Cox and then the Radio Air Service Corporation, WHK spent the 1940s and 1950s as the broadcast extension of daily newspaper The Plain Dealer. Owned by Metromedia from 1958 to 1973, WHK boasted a popular Top 40 format earlier in the decade led by Johnny Holliday, then switched to a middle of the road presentation in 1967 due to stiff competition from WIXY and WKYC. WHK also signed on an FM adjunct in 1946 which took on the identity of WMMS in 1968 as one of the city's first progressive rock outlets.

Purchased by Malrite Communications in 1973, WHK converted to a country music format headlined by shock jock Gary Dee, Joe Finan and, for a brief period, Don Imus. Flipping to oldies in 1984 and business news in 1988, WHK and WMMS would be sold twice between 1993 and 1994, segueing to sports radio in the latter year. Purchased by Salem in 1996, WHK adopted a Christian radio format and was paired with a full-time FM simulcast in the Akron–Canton region.

A complex asset swap in July 2001, saw WHK's Christian format and call sign move to 1220 AM after WCLV owner Radio Seaway purchased both the license to 1420 AM and the intellectual property of adult standards WRMR; WHK was known as WCLV from 2001 to 2003 and as WRMR from 2003 to 2004. After experiencing ratings and revenue losses with the standards format, Radio Seaway sold WRMR back to Salem in July 2004, and, with the restored WHK calls, has carried a conservative talk format since.

== History ==
=== Experimental license ===
WHK received its first broadcasting station license in February 1922. However, the station's history dates back to a series of broadcasts begun in August 1921 over an amateur radio station operated by WHK's original owner, Warren R. Cox.

Radio broadcasting in the United States started to become organized in the fall of 1919, largely due to improvements in vacuum tube design. Many of the earliest programs originated from a mixture of amateur and experimental stations. The amateurs in the Cleveland area were particularly well organized, and in early May 1921 the Cleveland Radio Association announced that its members had inaugurated a weekly Friday evening series of live concerts, transmitted on the standard amateur wavelength of 200 meters (1500 kHz) by a rotating roster of local amateur stations.

Warren R. Cox made his first contribution to the series on August 26, 1921, (Note: In later years, WHK recognized July 26, 1921, as their sign-on date after then-program director Chip Binder evaluated "everything we can find".) operating amateur station 8ACS at 3138 Payne Avenue S. E. (Note: The leading "8" in 8ACS's call sign denoted that the station was located in the eighth Radio Inspection district. The fact that the call sign's first letter, "A", was in the range A-W reflected its status as a standard amateur station. Other participating stations included Ira E. Beasley (8ACC), James Hausser (8BCA), Latimer Charnicky (8CD), Archibald G. Spiller (8ACR), H. H. Kreighbaum (8NQ), Edwin H. Poad (8UK), H. H. Hurd (8ALY), Norman M. Kraus (8AFO) and Frank M. J. Murphy (8ML).) This was the location of the Cox Manufacturing Company, which primarily produced electrical components for automotive markets and radio receiver construction. Cox's station was described as "one of the newer and most powerful in the city".

The 8ACS programs were soon recognized as providing "exceptional wireless entertainment", and B. Dreher's Sons Company donated a Steinway grand piano for use in the station's studio. In October, the Cleveland Radio Association concerts moved to Thursday nights; around this time, Warren R. Cox added his own weekly concerts on Sunday evenings. In December, the Cleveland Radio Association ended the Thursday broadcasts, and switched to exclusively supporting the 8ACS Sunday concerts.

Warren R. Cox's broadcasting activities gained special prominence during local elections held in the fall of 1921. The November 3 broadcast featured short speeches by six of the city's seven candidates for mayor. In addition, the Cleveland Plain Dealer made arrangements to relay vote totals on election night by telephone to 8ACS for broadcasting by the station.

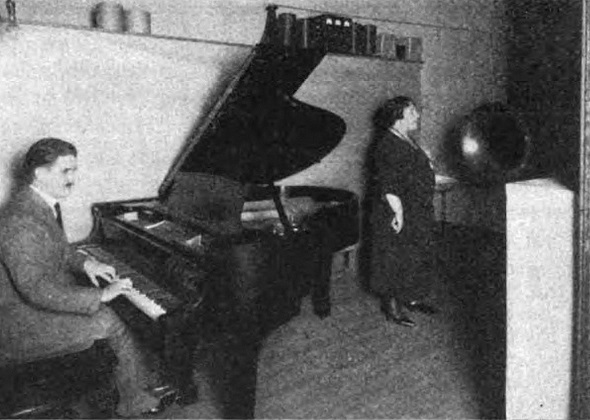
Soprano singer Carolina Hudson Alexander broadcasting over 8ACS in November 1921.

Initially there were no specific standards in the United States for radio stations making transmissions intended for the general public, and numerous stations under various classifications made entertainment broadcasts. However, effective December 1, 1921, the Department of Commerce, regulators of radio at this time, adopted a regulation that formally created a broadcasting station category, and stations were now required to hold a Limited Commercial license authorizing operation on wavelengths of 360 meters (833 kHz) for "entertainment" broadcasts or 485 meters (619 kHz) for "market and weather reports". By the end of 1922 over 500 stations would be authorized nationwide.

At first this new policy was loosely enforced, but in early February 1922, the government's official monitor of radio in the region, S. W. Edwards, (Note: Edwards's formal title was Radio Inspector for the Commerce Department's Eighth Radio Inspection district, which was headquartered in Detroit, Michigan.) contacted the local stations to reiterate that amateurs were no longer permitted to make entertainment broadcasts. Thus, on February 3, 1922, Edwin H. Poad, president of the Cleveland Radio Association, announced that his organization was ending the weekly broadcasts started nine months earlier. This ban also ended the broadcasts over 8ACS, however it was soon reported that Warren R. Cox was making plans to apply for one of the new broadcasting station licenses in order to return to the airwaves.

=== WHK (1922–2001) ===
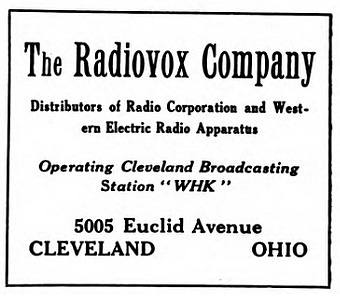
A December 1922 print ad

WHK was issued its first broadcasting station license on February 21, 1922, for operation on the 360–meter entertainment wavelength, with Warren R. Cox listed as the licensee. Prior to April 4, 1922, the Commerce Department issued three-letter call signs to most commercial radio stations; the WHK call letters were randomly chosen and did not have any particular meaning. (Note: Some later accounts suggest that, instead of being randomly assigned, the WHK call letters were selected because they were the initials of station manager Harry K. Carpenter. However, Carpenter did start working for WHK until July 23, 1934, and was not associated with the station at the time of its founding.) According to one analysis, WHK was the second broadcasting station license issued for Ohio, and the 52nd in the United States, and is Ohio's oldest surviving radio station, and 15th in the country.

The station began broadcasting from the Radiovox Company, which was located at the Stuyvesant Building on 5005 Euclid Avenue. WHK's debut broadcast, on Sunday night March 5, 1922, was advertised as a continuation of the suspended Cleveland Radio Association weekly concert series. Cox announced that, in addition to the Sunday schedule, he planned to broadcast Tuesday night concerts in conjunction with the Keith vaudeville organization, with additional programs on Thursday nights. In July 1922 the station's transmitting power was reported to be 200 watts. Later in the year the licensee name was changed to "Radiovox Company (Warren R. Cox)".

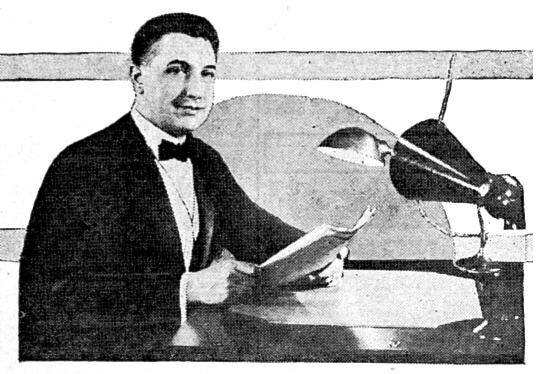
WHK founder Warren R. Cox (1923)

In May 1923, the U.S. government made additional broadcasting station transmitting frequencies available and by late 1923, WHK was reassigned to 283 meters (1060 kHz). On July 29, 1924, WHK opened new studios at the Hotel Winton at 1010 Prospect Avenue (later the Hotel Carter); at the same time, WHK entered a partnership with the Cleveland Press, which provided live concerts on Thursday nights. WHK was again moved from 1060 kHz to 1100 kHz in early 1925.

Radiovox was taken over by their creditors in late August 1925, spurring speculation WHK could become a commercial radio station. The Radio Air Service Corporation purchased WHK by October, and on February 28, 1926, relaunched as a commercial station with new studios at Carnegie Hall at 1220 Huron Road; the former Hotel Winton studios were taken over by WDBK. By June 1, 1927, WHK was reassigned to 1130 kHz, originally intended as a timeshare with WJAY, but WJAY instead shared time with WFJC, the former WDBK now based in Akron.

WHK again moved their studios and transmitter to the top floor of the Engineers Bank Building at 1370 Ontario Street, which opened on April 7, 1928. At this location, a bronze plaque denoted WHK as "Cleveland's Pioneer Broadcasting Station". WHK joined the Columbia Broadcasting System (CBS) on September 2, 1928, as the network's 22nd affiliate; while WADC in Akron had been a charter CBS affiliate, its low power proved difficult for reception in Cleveland. (Note: Later media coverage has incorrectly claimed WHK affiliated with CBS in 1930.)

As part of the Federal Radio Commission's (FRC) General Order 40, WHK was reassigned to 1390 kHz on November 11, 1928. The FRC again intended WHK to timeshare with WJAY but this was reversed after WHK objected, and WJAY was moved to 1450 kHz, immediately resulting in heterodyne interference from both stations. By March 1929, the FRC moved WJAY to 620 kHz, which resolved interference with WHK but created pre- and post-sunset interference with WTMJ in Milwaukee, which also broadcast at 620 kHz.

WHK manager M. A. Howlett remained angry over persistent interference, and proposed the FRC either make 1390 kHz a clear-channel frequency, have WHK's power increased, or move WHK to a clear-channel. Howlett also applied to move WHK's transmitter out of the city with 5,000 watts. Due to the FRC being scrutinized by U.S. Congress, WHK's application was indefinitely delayed by January 1929, then was granted a temporary permit to operate at 2,000 watts during the daytime; this was due to the FRC being short-staffed. WHK initially planned to site the transmitter in Bedford, but due to potential interference with beacons at Cleveland Airport, an alternate site was selected in Seven Hills on a vineyard.

WHK's new transmitter was activated on February 5, 1930, capable of broadcasting 5,000 watts but was still authorized at 1,000 watts. The Engineers Building transmitter remained as a backup and was utilized by WGAR for its debut broadcast on December 15, 1930, as the transmitter they planned to use was inadequate. WHK filed to operate at 2,500 watts daytime to assist with instructional programming produced by the Cleveland Public Schools; the FRC offered temporary authorization in January 1930 but rejected a permanent arrangement by March, prompting Howlett to threaten legal action against the FRC.

The debut broadcast of The Lutheran Hour originated from WHK's studios for CBS on October 2, 1930. On September 8, 1931, the station moved to new studios at the top floor of the Higbee Building on Public Square; (Note: Also registered as "1331 Terminal Tower".) over 1,000 people, including CBS sportscaster Ted Husing as keynote speaker, attended the dedication. CBS president William S. Paley praised the new studios as "handsome" and a standard other radio stations would strive for.

As of January 1, 1934, WHK was broadcasting with a daytime power of 2,500 watts and a nighttime power of 1,000 watts. The station broadcast a full season of Cleveland Indians baseball games in 1936, with announcers Jack Graney and Pinky Hunter.

==== United Broadcasting ownership ====
In 1939 the Radio Air Service Corporation sold WHK to the United Broadcasting Company, which also purchased WCLE, a station that had been broadcasting in Cleveland since January 5, 1927, and was currently transmitting on 610 kHz. WCLE's studios were relocated to the Terminal Tower to join WHK, and the two stations were placed under common management. WHK switched its network affiliation in 1937 from CBS to the NBC Blue Network plus the Mutual Broadcasting System, which had started three years earlier. In the 1940s WHK, like most Mutual affiliates, became a participant in network programming.

Rhythm and Rhyme Time was a Saturday night band concert on Mutual that originated from the Terrace Room of the Statler Hotel through the WHK's facilities. In 1943, when the NBC Blue Network was sold to Edward Noble to eventually become ABC, the Blue Network switched its Cleveland affiliate from WHK to WJW, leaving WHK with just Mutual. The Mutual network brought its popular Queen for a Day program to Cleveland Music Hall on April 5, 1946, for a two days of broadcast with local contestants chosen by WHK.

On March 29, 1941, WHK, along with all the other stations on 1390 kHz, moved to 1420 kHz as part of the implementation of the North American Regional Broadcasting Agreement. In 1945 as the FCC began enforcing a rule limiting owners to a single AM station in a market, United Broadcasting moved WCLE out of Cleveland to Akron and changed its call sign to WHKK and its frequency to 640 kHz. (WHKK became WHLO in 1962.) This in turn meant United could now use the vacated 610 frequency in Columbus, where it was assigned to WHKC, which had been broadcasting daytime-only on 640. (WHKC became WTVN in the 1950s).

In August 1946 WHK received an experimental FM license, W8XUB, transmitting at 107.1 MHz; this station became WHK-FM at 100.7 MHz upon receipt of a commercial license.

WHK also obtained a construction permit for television station WHK-TV on Channel 19, but this never made it on the air, due to the financial challenge of the time of launching a UHF station in a VHF market such as Cleveland.

WHK moved its studios in 1951 to 5000 Euclid Avenue, across the street from its first studio location, which it would occupy for 26 years. (This is presently the site of the Agora Theatre and Ballroom and Lava Room Recording.) In 1955, ownership was transferred to the Forest City Publishing Company, the parent company of The Plain Dealer. In May 1957, as part of the station's 35th anniversary celebration, WHK honored founder Warren R. Cox with "a small transistor radio and a plaque".

==== Metromedia ownership ====
The February 10, 1958, issue of Broadcasting magazine reported that WHK AM/FM, along with the construction permit for channel 19, were "on verge of being sold", with the DuMont Broadcasting Corporation as the likely buyer. The $700,000 deal for all three stations (equivalent to $7.81 million in 2025) was approved by the FCC by April, with the company renaming itself as Metropolitan Broadcasting by July and again to Metromedia in 1961. (Note: Later in the year, John Kluge withdrew his planned purchase of WSRS/WSRS-FM in Cleveland Heights after he purchased a controlling interest in Metropolitan.) The new owners soon adopted a rock and roll Top 40 format. Morning man Ernie Anderson was let go because he did not fit into the new format. Ironically, Anderson would later find local fame with his Ghoulardi character that would have been ideally suited as an early rock disk jockey. Pete "Mad Daddy" Myers, another early iconic rock DJ, was lured away from rival WJW for a successful stint in WHK's early rock-and-roll years, before he left for New York.

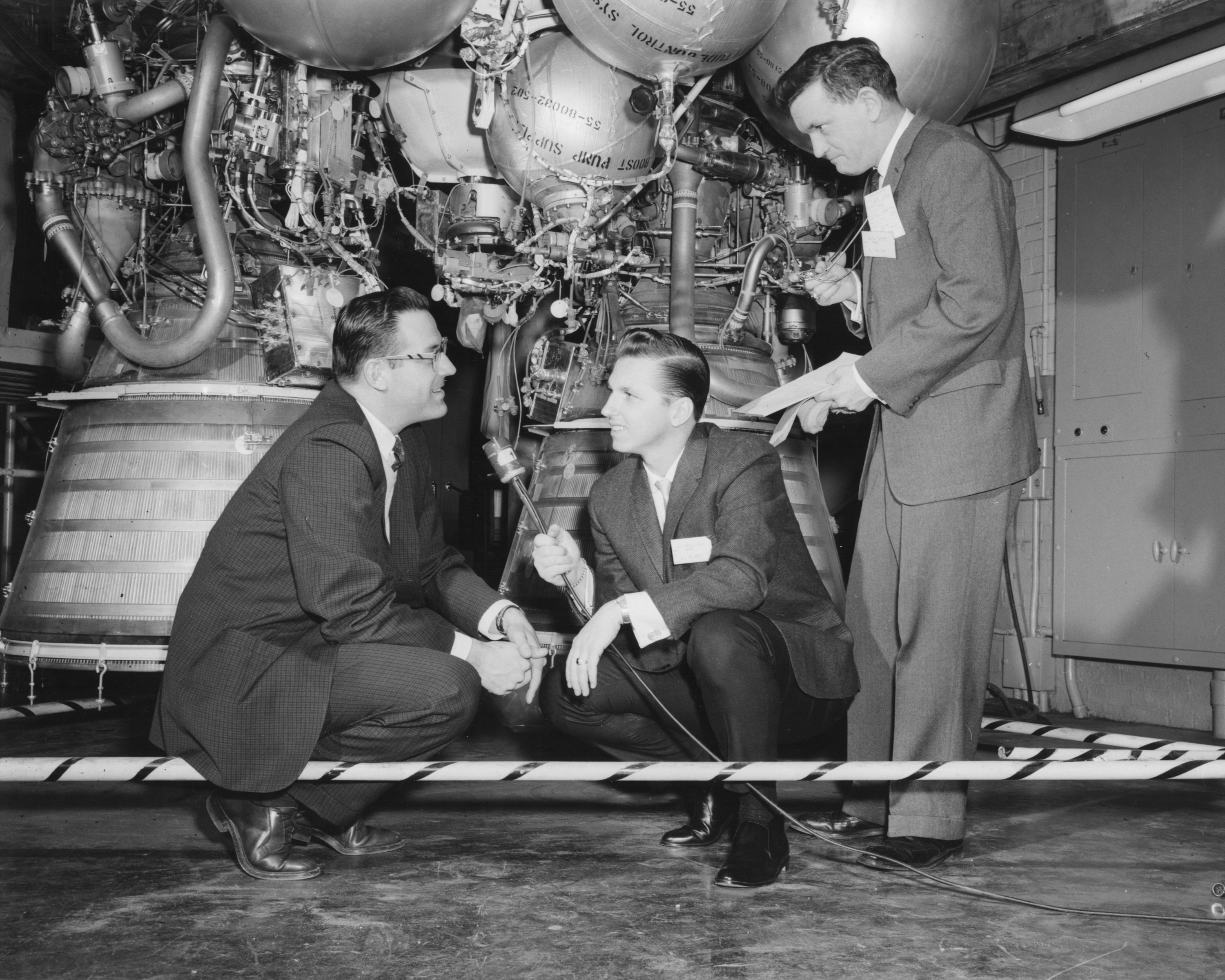
WHK Centaur interview at the Space Power Chamber (December 1963)

By the early 1960s WHK was Top 40 powerhouse, adopting the slogan "Color Radio" and "Color Channel 14." The station soared with fast-talking deejays like Johnny Holliday, who broadcast from "the glass cage" at 5000 Euclid, and dubbed the station's echo-chamber reverberation its "stratophonic sound." The "Action Central" newsroom included young reporters Tim Taylor and Dave Buckel. When The Beatles made one of their North American tours in 1964, WHK outmaneuvered rival KYW to sponsor the Beatles appearance at Cleveland Public Auditorium on September 15, 1964. The station offered free tickets to listeners with an on-air promotion; the winners were selected in what is believed to be the first automated audience selection. Those receiving tickets were selected by an IBM computer. In the mid-1960s, the WHK DJs adopted the name the "Good Guys" and included Joe Mayer. On the cover of The Beatles’ Sgt. Pepper album, a doll wears a sweater emblazoned with "Welcome The Rolling Stones" and "Good Guys", a possible reference to the WHK DJs.

Late in 1967, WHK stopped rocking to become "The Good Life Station," with easy-listening music and phone-in shows aimed at older listeners. Possibly the biggest reason for the format change at WHK, was the pressure put on the station by newcomer WIXY, an AM station at 1260 which started playing top 40 music in 1966.

In 1968 the FCC mandated that FM sister stations could no longer duplicate their AM sister's programming, and WHK-FM adopted a new progressive rock sound, one of a handful of commercial stations in the country to try that format. The callsign of WHK-FM was changed to WMMS on September 28, 1968.

From 1968 through 1984, WHK was the flagship station of the Cleveland Browns radio network. Gib Shanley provided play-by-play commentary for the majority of the Browns' run at WHK; he was succeeded by Nev Chandler. Color commentary duties were first held by Jim Graner, then Jim Mueller, and finally Doug Dieken, who continues in that position to this day.

==== Malrite years ====
Metromedia sold WHK and WMMS in November 1971 to Detroit–based Malrite Broadcasting for $3.5 million (equivalent to $27.8 million in 2025); co-founder Milton Maltz had applied for a job at WHK in 1958 while awaiting approval to build WTTF in Tiffin, Ohio. When the sale closed, Malrite moved its corporate headquarters to Cleveland. WHK dropped the beautiful music in 1973 for "Cover Hits", a modified Top 40 format developed by Mike Joseph featuring hit songs recorded by different artists instead of the more well-known versions. Despite a visible marketing and promotional effort, "Cover Hits" failed to catch on in the Arbitron ratings in the Fall 1973 book, while ratings for WMMS doubled.

Maltz originally intended to flip WMMS to country music but rescinded those plans after the station's air talent, listeners, community activist Henry Speeth and Cleveland councilman Dennis Kucinich lobbied in support of the progressive rock format. Ultimately, it was WHK that flipped to country on March 16, 1974, within two weeks of WNCR's format switch to country from Top 40. Veteran personality Joe Finan was originally placed in morning drive with the switch but former WERE host Gary Dee (Gary D. Gilbert) took over the slot in July 1975 after WERE switched to an all-news format. Dee's addition moved Finan to middays, turning WHK into a combination country and talk format and the lone country outlet in the market as WNCR flipped to beautiful music as WKSW. After being fired from New York City's WNBC for excessive drinking and absenteeism in 1977, WHK hired Don Imus—who briefly hosted mornings on WGAR in 1971—for afternoon drive until WNBC rehired him a year later.

The majority of attention and media coverage for the station, however, focused on the mercurial shock jock Dee. In one particular incident, Dee claimed "40 percent" of money raised during the annual MDA Labor Day Telethon went to Jerry Lewis with the MDA keeping the other 60 percent; after finding out WHK took out newspaper advertisements apologizing for his claim, Dee resigned on-air but management refused to accept it. Dee's volatile and public marriage with WEWS-TV anchor Liz Richards, which had the couple repeatedly trading insults on his show, ended after Dee's 1980 arrest on domestic violence charges. WMMS program director John Gorman later recalled how Dee would typically conclude his show at 10 a.m., leave the studio, quietly stand against a wall and take deep breaths for a few minutes and eventually come out of character.

On February 14, 1977, WHK and WMMS moved their studios from 5000 Euclid Avenue to the Statler Office Tower near Playhouse Square, which originally housed WGAR and their FM adjunct WNCR from 1930 through the early 1970s.

WHK's monopoly on country music ended when WKSW flipped back to country in April 1980 and WWWE also switching to country in December 1981. All three stations struggled in the Arbitron ratings, with WHK and WKSW seeing slight declines and WWWE losing listeners. The three-way battle also affected Dee's ratings, falling from first place to fifth. Following a nearly month-long absence, WHK fired Dee on September 27, 1983, after a survey commissioned by Malrite showed that Dee's largely negative approach no longer appealed to listeners who felt more positive about Cleveland. Prior to his firing, Dee only referred to himself by his birth name as a contract negotiation ploy, claiming that Gary Dee is "dead"; WHK was ultimately compelled to take out advertisements in The Plain Dealer stating, "Gary Dee is gone for good."

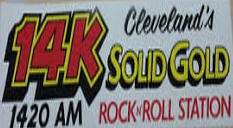
WHK's "14K Solid Gold" logo, 1984–1988.

Dee's departure caused WHK's ratings to decline substantially against WKSW, while WWWE reverted to MOR in August 1983. Conceding the country battle outright to WKSW, WHK flipped to oldies on April 24, 1984, as "14K Solid Gold" intended as complementary to WMMS and utilizing that station's existing record library, with WMMS calling it a "transistor sister". Gorman, who helped oversee the launch of "14K", boasted that the station would play "full-service rock 'n' roll, and no wimpy stuff either, no Barry Manilow or Bobby Sherman." The station also carried Dr. Demento's syndicated show on weekends. WHK's relationship with the Browns ended after the 1984 season when team owner Art Modell attempted to move the radio rights to his own station, WJW (850 AM) and later sold WJW to purchase WWWE and WDOK.

Following program director Bernie Kimble's departure for WNCX in 1986 (along with Gorman), the station fired the majority of local air talent as February 1987 began, opting to use Transtar Radio Networks' "The Oldies Channel." WHK fell to 19th place in the Cleveland Fall 1988 Arbitron ratings and 23rd place in Akron, symptomatic of music-oriented AM stations. In a time-brokered arrangement with Belkin Productions, the station began breaking format on Saturday nights to air heavy metal. On November 14, 1988, WHK switched to a business-themed format with Business Radio Network and NBC Talknet programming along with local news updates. General manager Chuck Bortnick defined the format as "the Wall Street Journal, Business Week magazine and the USA Today money section all rolled into one" while Akron Beacon Journal radio critic Bob Dyer regarded WHK as "... (epitomizing) the longtime radio trend of 'narrowcasting'". WHK started simulcasting the audio of WJW-TV's 6 p.m. newscasts in mid-1990, and along with WMMS, regained the Browns rights in 1991 in what was termed an "expensive" deal.

WHK's format transitioned again to talk radio on August 10, 1992, when veteran local hosts Merle Pollis and Joel Rose joined the station in late-morning and afternoon drive. In 1992, studios were moved again to the Skylight Office Tower as part of the Tower City Center complex.

==== Shamrock and OmniAmerica ====
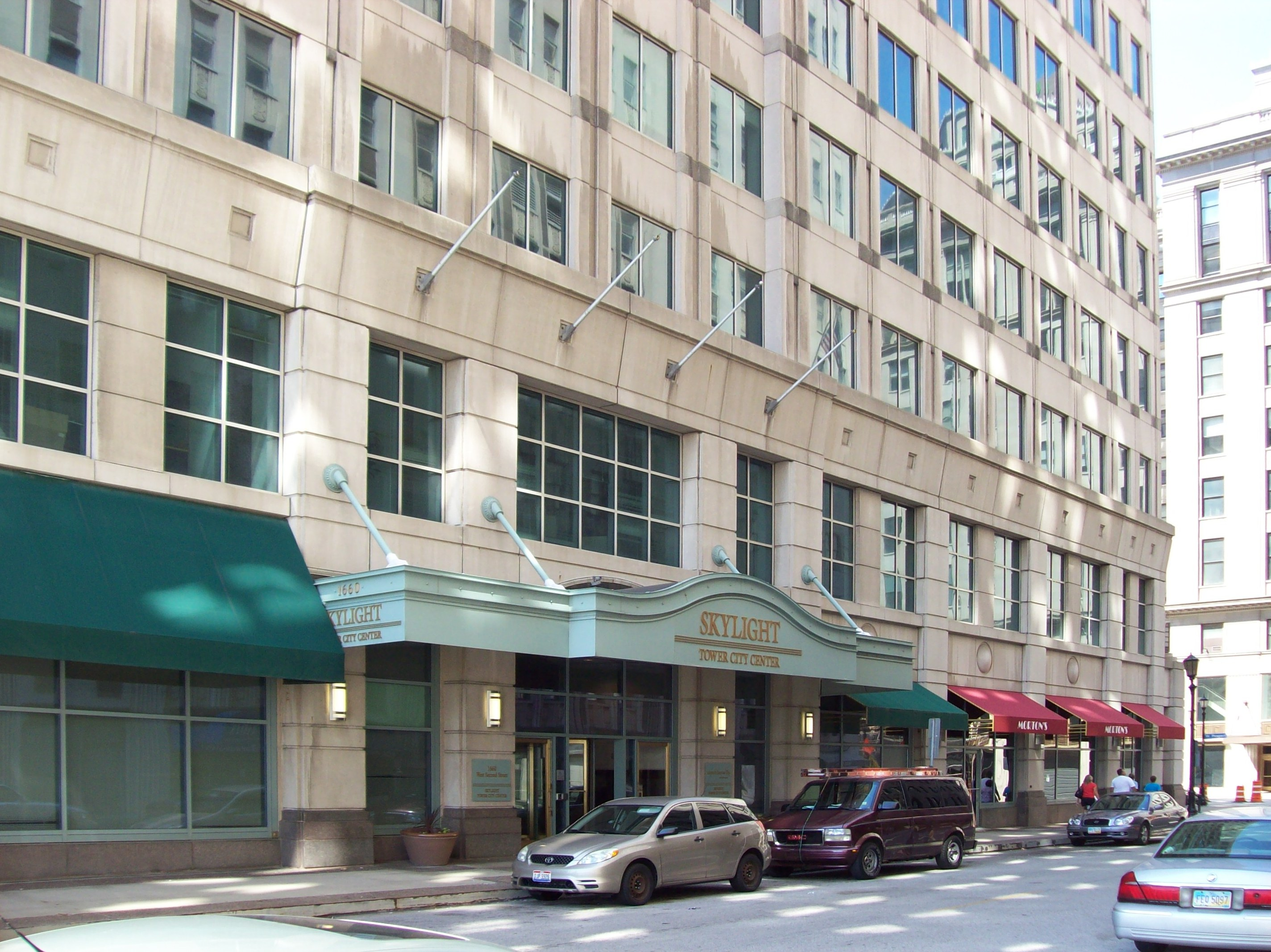
The Skylight Office Tower complex housed WHK's studios from 1992 through 1996.

Early in 1992, Malrite found itself unable to service its growing debt, with Standard & Poor's putting $115 million of junk bonds held by the company for downgrading. By December of that year, trade publications began reporting on a possible merger between Malrite's radio group and Shamrock Broadcasting—controlled by Roy E. Disney—and a potential re-sale of WHK and WMMS to former Malrite executive and WMJI owner Carl Hirsch. WMJI had already formed a joint operating venture with WHK/WMMS that merged the station's marketing and sales staffs, but continued to be run autonomously. The $300 million (equivalent to $669 million in 2025) Shamrock-Malrite merger, including the assumption of $165.5 million in Malrite debt, was announced in March 1993. Pollis and Rose both left on October 1, 1993, after the Shamrock merger cleared, with WHK airing an all-syndicated lineup of Doug Stephan, G. Gordon Liddy and Charles Adler.

The rumors of Shamrock spinning off WHK/WMMS to Hirsch came to pass on November 2, 1993, in a $12 million (equivalent to $26.7 million in 2025) deal. As part of the deal, Hirsch transferred WMJI, which he had owned under the "Legacy Broadcasting" name, to OmniAmerica. In announcing the deal, Hirsch spoke of restoring WHK by possibly installing an aggressive locally oriented news and talk format, stating, "what you have now on AM radio doesn't work". Prior to the takeover, WHK/WMMS lost the Browns radio rights to both WKNR and WDOK, while Hirsch also openly floated the idea of flipping WHK back to country.

None of WHK's employees were retained when the deal closed on April 15, with the station continuing to run the all-syndicated talk lineup on a temporary basis. WHK flipped to sports radio on May 16, 1994, featuring Tom Bush, Les Levine, Rick Bay and WMJI sportscaster Tony Rizzo. WHK's approach to the format was regarded as more loose and "fan-friendly" as opposed to WKNR, which WHK hosts openly criticized for being tightly programmed, rigid and sober. Bush and Bay were reassigned to other roles by early July due to personal schedule conflicts with Pat McCabe, Dan McDowell and Ken Jurek being added to the lineup; Jurek was eventually replaced by producer Ron Brines. The station also signed up as an affiliate of the Ohio State Sports Network.

WHK struggled in the Arbitron ratings, with Levine as the highest-rated show but heavily outranked by both WKNR's Geoff Sindelar and WWWE's Mike Trivisonno. WKNR had a stronger signal along with the Browns and Indians radio rights; by contrast, WHK held play-by-play rights to Ohio State, Cleveland State Vikings men's basketball, the Cleveland Crunch and Lumberjacks IHL hockey. The Fall 1995 Arbitron ratings, influenced by the 1995 World Series and the Browns relocation controversy, showed WHK continuing to trail WKNR by substantial margins. By February 4, 1996, WHK began simulcasting WMJI's morning show with John Lanigan, John Webster and Jimmy Malone (whom Rizzo did sports reports for) as part of a wide-ranging schedule realignment that also saw executives Phil Levine and Art Greenberg dismissed. The station continued to air brokered programming throughout the weekend, a practice WERE also embraced throughout the week.

==== Salem purchase and Christian radio ====
I don't know how we'll be remembered in a few years. But at least we're being mourned now.

— Pat McCabe, WHK host, on the station's final day of local sports talk programming

On April 25, 1996, OmniAmerica sold WHK to Salem Communications for $6.5 million (equivalent to $13.3 million in 2025); this followed Nationwide Communications' purchase of WMJI and WMMS two days earlier. Hirsch told Broadcasting & Cable that OmniAmerica tried unsuccessfully to acquire additional stations in Cleveland and opted to concentrate on their Orlando properties; OmniAmerica previously attempted to merge into Citicasters in August 1995, but that deal was called off by November.

Salem's purchase promptly initiated talk of WHK changing to Christian radio given the company's strong focus on religious broadcasting; Plain Dealer critic Roger Brown regarded WHK as "the runt of the OmniAmerica litter ... always in a state of perpetual starvation" with little to no money for marketing and promotion. All local programming was eliminated on June 28, 1996: while praising the staff for a classy farewell broadcast, Brown described the remaining weeks of local shows as "the audio equivalent of being at a wake" while Levine called it "just horrible".

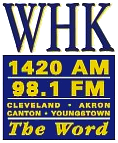
WHK/WHK-FM simulcast logo, 1997–2001.

Syndicated sports talk aired as filler until the sale closed on September 2, 1996; Salem also announced WHK's transmitter site in Seven Hills would be upgraded. Salem then purchased WHLO and WTOF-FM in October 1996 and daytimer WCCD in March 1997; WTOF was subsequently converted to WHK-FM on June 13, 1997, simulcasting WHK on weekdays but with separate weekend programming. In addition to the station's lineup of taped sermons and Christian music, nationally syndicated area pastor Alistair Begg aired daily on WHK and WHK-FM. In October 1997, both stations broadcast live from the "Stand in the Gap" rally held by Promise Keepers. By 1998, the station added a daily talk show hosted by Eric Hogue, an area pastor.

When Clear Channel Communications merged into AMFM, Inc., Salem acquired WRMR (850 AM) and WKNR on May 6, 2000, as part of a court-ordered divestiture.

=== 2001 "frequency swap" ===
WHK was one of seven Northeast Ohio radio stations involved in a complex exchange on July 3, 2001, between three radio companies. (Note: Although generally reported as a "frequency swap", these stations mostly traded call signs, formats and staffers in order to facilitate ownership transfers for four of the seven stations. See WCPN § 2001 "frequency swap".) Announced on November 1, 2000, WCLV (95.5 FM) parent Radio Seaway agreed to donate the assets of WCLV to a nonprofit foundation; in order to finance the deal, Radio Seaway sold the station's 95.5 FM license to Salem and purchased the licenses for Lorain's 104.9 FM from Clear Channel and 1420 AM from Salem, while Salem sold WHK-FM's license to Clear Channel. Negotiations between Salem, Clear Channel and Radio Seaway had been ongoing for nearly two years. Radio Seaway's original plan for 1420 AM was to simulcast the classical programming originated from 104.9 FM, which was weaker than the original 95.5 FM signal and centered primarily around Cleveland's western suburbs.

Salem retained WHK's format and call letters and announced plans on May 17, 2001, to transfer them to 1220 AM in place of WKNR, simultaneously transferring WKNR's call sign and sports format from 1220 AM to 850 AM, displacing WRMR's adult standards format entirely. Despite WRMR still having respectable ratings in the 12+ demographic, the format struggled throughout the 1990s in the 25–54 demographic—seen by agencies as the most lucrative—and had a core demographic of 65 and older. On May 31, Radio Seaway announced 1420 AM would adopt the standards format, agreeing to purchase WRMR's intellectual property, including the music library and some equipment, for an undisclosed fee. Acknowledging the signal weaknesses of 104.9 FM to the east of Cleveland, Radio Seaway arranged a partial simulcast for WCLV-FM programming with Painesville station WBKC.

=== Radio Seaway ownership (2001–2003) ===
WCLV logo, 2001–2003.

In announcing the format change—reported on as "a new version of WRMR"—Radio Seaway billed WCLV's format as "classic pop". The station placed an emphasis on older standards from the 1930s and 1940s, along with assorted show tunes, in an attempt to make the format hold a more sophisticated sound along the lines of WCLV-FM's classical format. In response to WRMR's format attracting older demos, Robert Conrad, WCLV's co-founder and president, said, "the people who grew up with Bach aren't around anymore either." The entirety of WRMR's air talent was retained for WCLV except for Bill Randle and Rob Schuler; Randle joined WCLV in 2002, while Schuler stayed with Salem as WFHM-FM's midday host. Jim Davis, WRMR's operations manager since 2000, again both programmed and assumed on-air duties.

The long-running Irish Hour with Gerry Quinn, a WRMR staple, also made the move to WCLV on Sunday mornings. WCLV-FM news director Hugh Danaceau also did live drive-time newscasts on the AM station until his death in 2003. Many of WCLV-FM's long-running specialty shows, including Weekend Radio, the City Club of Cleveland's weekly forum, and Footlight Parade were also aired; Footlight Parade host Bill Rudman also hosted a Saturday afternoon program for the AM station.

WRMR logo, 2003–2004.

On January 1, 2003, WCLV's call sign was changed to WRMR, reinforcing the station's link to the former WRMR at 850 AM and to resolve confusion between it and WCLV-FM. Rebranded as "The Songs You Love", WRMR's music programming reverted to adult standards, again placing an emphasis on pop music and contemporary ballads from the 1950s and 1960s. In November 2003, WRMR's lineup significantly changed: Ted Alexander replaced Ted Hallaman in the morning slot, WCLV staffer John Simna assumed the mid-morning slot and Jim Davis and Carl Reese were moved to the afternoon and evening slots, respectively.

Radio Seaway operated 1420 AM at a loss; while WRMR had higher ratings than WCLV-FM, the classical format had a younger, upscale audience more desirable for advertisers. Suffering a further decline in listenership and revenue, Radio Seaway sold WRMR back to Salem on July 6, 2004, for $10 million (equivalent to $17 million in 2025) and included a local marketing agreement effective July 13. Robert Conrad said, "we gave [the standards format] three years, but unfortunately it's dying all across the country". The sale was indicative of the adult standards format fading from terrestrial radio, having fallen from a peak of 595 stations nationwide in 1999 to 457 stations in 2004. Randle died three days later, on July 9 at the age of 81; his final show was voice-tracked and aired on WRMR the day before Salem's LMA took effect.

=== Conservative talk era (2005–present) ===
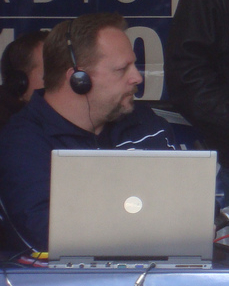
Bob Frantz

Salem changed WRMR's format to conservative talk, assuming WCCD's existing format and program lineup. While branded "WHK" and reported on as "WHK moving back to 1420 on the dial", the WRMR call sign stayed until April 5, 2005, when the sale was consummated; WHK then changed their calls to WHKW, allowing the WHK calls to be restored on 1420 AM. While WHK's conservative talk format was at launch entirely syndicated via the Salem Radio Network, a local program hosted by area personality Bob Frantz was added in 2015. WHK was rebranded as "The Answer" on April 15, 2013, a slogan used by many Salem-owned conservative talk stations.

Frantz's local show was cancelled in December 2025 as part of larger cutbacks at Salem Media and was replaced by Jake Underwood, executive director for the Medina County Republican Party.

== Current programming ==
In addition to Underwood's local show, WHK features Salem Radio Network hosts during the bulk of the day, with John B. Wells' Caravan to Midnight and Bloomberg Radio airing in the overnight/early morning hours. Brokered programming makes up the majority of the station's weekend lineup.

== FM translator ==
WHK is additionally relayed over the following low-power FM translator:

Broadcast translator for WHK
Call sign	Frequency	City of license	FID	ERP (W)	HAAT	Class	Transmitter coordinates	FCC info
W275DF	102.9 FM	Cleveland	143930	50	9 m (30 ft)	D	41°23′36.8″N 81°39′15.7″W	LMS

Signal contours for WHK and associated translator.; Daytime groundwave 2 mV/m signal for WHK; Grade A 60 dBu signal for W275DF

== See also ==
- List of initial AM-band station grants in the United States
- List of three-letter broadcast call signs in the United States

== Bibliography ==
- Gorman, John; Feran, Tom (2007). The Buzzard: Inside the Glory Days of WMMS and Cleveland Rock Radio. Cleveland: Gray & Co. ISBN 9781886228474.
- Olszewski, Mike (2003). Radio Daze: Stories from the Front in Cleveland's FM Air Wars. Kent, Ohio: Kent State University Press. ISBN 9780873387736. Archived from the original on December 9, 2016 – via Google Books.
- Olszewski, Mike; Berg, Richard; Wolff, Carlo (2011). WIXY 1260: Pixies, Six-Packs, and Supermen (PDF). Kent, Ohio: Black Squirrel Books. p. 88. ISBN 978-1-60635-099-7. Archived (PDF) from the original on September 26, 2021.
