= Martin Perlich =

American broadcaster and writer (1937–2025)

Martin Perlich (1937 – October 25, 2025) was an American broadcaster and writer. He attended Western Reserve Academy in Hudson, Ohio and Columbia University, where he studied music history with composer Douglas Moore.

After a one-off 1965 interview with Leonard Bernstein for WCLV (95.5 FM) in Cleveland, he went on to become the first Intermission Host of the syndicated Cleveland Orchestra radio broadcasts, working closely with musical director George Szell. During his seven years as host, he interviewed hundreds of musicians, including Aaron Copland, Darius Milhaud, Arthur Fiedler, Robert Shaw, and Isaac Stern.

While employed as the Buyer for local record chain, Disc Records, in late 1966 Perlich debuted the Perlich Project on WCLV (95.5 FM), a mixture of classical music with early selections of progressive rock, poetry, radical comedy and jazz, along with Perlich's own personal comments and editorials on events of the day. His show was one of the earliest such shows on commercial radio and a model for the progressive rock medium. Perlich later moved his program to noted Cleveland rock station WMMS (100.7 FM) during its early, pre-Buzzard days as a progressive rock outlet.

In 1972, Perlich joined the staff of Los Angeles progressive rock station KMET – formerly a WMMS sister station (prior to Perlich's move, both stations were owned by Metromedia) – where he hosted Electric Tongue, a weekly interview show featuring major rock and arts figures. In 1975 Perlich became Creative Consultant of NBC-TV's weekly 90-minute show The Midnight Special, responsible for the acclaimed "Salute" segment, a regular documentary featuring artists including Jerry Lee Lewis, Aretha Franklin, Stevie Wonder, Loretta Lynn and others, in addition to writing, rehearsing and assisting with editing the show.

Beginning at KFAC in Los Angeles in 1988 his interview show Martin Perlich Interviews won the New York International Radio Festival for two consecutive years and was syndicated nationally by WCLV (95.5 FM)/Seaway productions.

Particularly notable are his eight Frank Zappa interviews, along with Lawrence Ferlinghetti, R. Crumb, Dexter Gordon, Jackson Browne, Pierre Boulez, Tom Waits, Lou Reed, Bill Evans, John McLaughlin, Judy Collins, and Roy Orbison.

From 2000 to 2008 Martin served as program director of non-commercial KCSN, named "Best of LA" by Los Angeles magazine in 2006. In addition Perlich hosted a daily classical and new music show, as well as a live daily arts interview show "ARF!!" (ARTS & ROOTS FORUM) featuring Steve Reich, Murray Mednick, Terry Riley, Sandra Tsing Loh, Stacy Keach, and others in a seven-year run.

In 2010, Perlich's interview archive was acquired by University of California, Los Angeles which intends to make available all recorded interviews, as well as personal memorabilia and papers. Debuting in 2010 will be a new series of video interviews with New Music artists, including Elliott Carter, Zakir Hussain, David Harrington.

His books include The Art of the Interview (2007, Silman-James Press), The Wild Times (2006, Empty Press), The Self-Pity Chronicles (2011, Empty Press).

Perlich was honored by the Rock and Roll Hall of Fame in 1998 for his contributions to rock radio. A copy of his public TV documentary Citizen Artist is in the Smithsonian permanent collection (2007). As an actor, he has worked with director Norman Corwin and with Jeff von der Schmidt and Southwest Chamber Music in Samuel Beckett's Cascando at Zipper Hall in Los Angeles.

Perlich lives in West Hollywood, California.

Martin Perlich is the father of character actor Max Perlich, KKJZ host Miles Perlich and writer Neil Perlich-Porter.

Perlich died on October 25, 2025, at the age of 88–89.
