= Johnny Holliday =

American Radio and Television Sportscaster

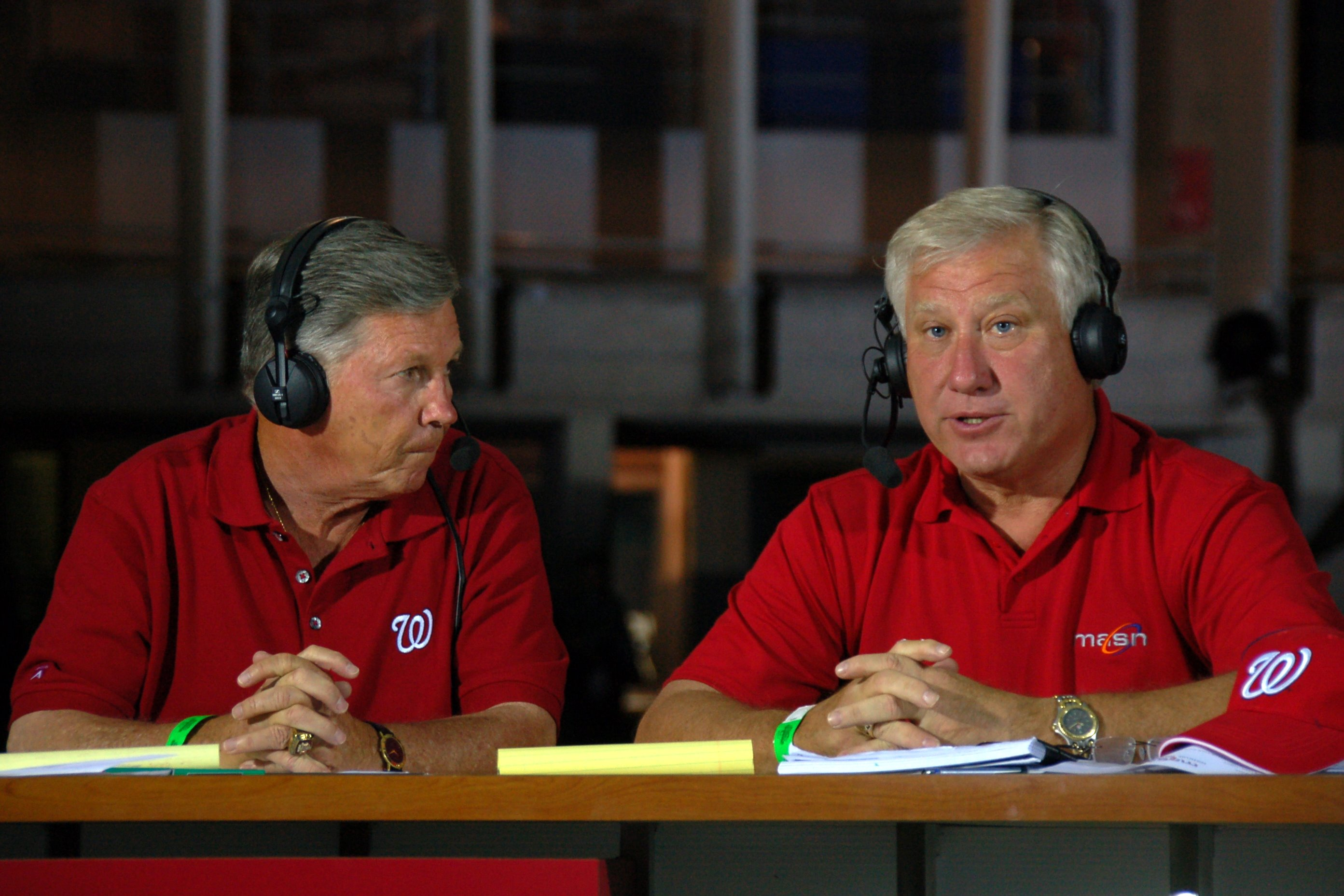
- Johnny Holliday, left, and Ray Knight hosting Nats Xtra on June 23, 2007.
- Born: October 15, 1937 (age 88); Miami, Florida, U.S.
- Occupation: Sportscaster
- Spouse: Mary Clare
- Children: Kellie, Tracie, and Moira

John Holliday Bobbitt (born October 15, 1937), known professionally as Johnny Holliday, is an American radio and television sportscaster and a former Top 40 radio disc jockey. He has maintained a long association with the University of Maryland football and basketball teams and from 2007 to 2018 hosted a pre- and post-game television program for the Washington Nationals baseball team.

== Early life ==
Holliday was born and raised in Miami, Florida, and was in the first graduating class at North Miami High School.

== Broadcasting career ==
=== Top 40 disc jockey ===
He began his radio career at WBBN in Perry, Georgia, then worked at WFEC in Florida, WVRM in Rochester, New York, WHK in Cleveland. He worked closely with Murray the K at WINS in New York City and hosted the station's final music broadcast in 1965. This led him west to Top 40 giant KYA in San Francisco where in 1965 Holliday was named America's number one disc jockey by the Bill Gavin Radio "Gavin Report." His radio work is featured in the Rock and Roll Hall of Fame. In connection with the station he hosted record hops and concerts, including co-hosting the final concert by the Beatles at Candlestick Park in 1966.

Holliday moved to Washington, D.C., in 1969, handling morning drive time duties for WWDC until 1978, and sports for WMAL from 1978 to 1991.

=== Sports ===
During his long sportscasting career Holliday has been affiliated with the University of Maryland, San Francisco Warriors, Washington Bullets/Wizards, Washington Redskins, Cleveland Browns, Oakland Raiders, San Francisco Giants, Washington Senators, Washington Federals, Washington Nationals, Stanford University, the University of California, the Naval Academy, and George Washington University. He has covered the Olympics, championship boxing, and The Masters for ABC Radio.

Holliday was the public address announcer at the Cleveland Browns matchup against the Dallas Cowboys that took place two days after the Assassination of John F. Kennedy in November 1963. Browns owner Art Modell instructed Holliday to refer to the opposing team only as the "Cowboys", without reference to the City of Dallas.

While at KYA from 1965 to 1969, he demonstrated versatility by broadcasting local college athletics on radio and television, and serving as a public address announcer for both the Oakland Raiders and San Francisco Warriors. After arriving in Washington, Holliday hosted the Washington Senators pre-game show on radio with Ted Williams, did radio and TV coverage for the Washington Bullets and Wizards, and hosted Redskins shows on TV with players including Dexter Manley, Mark Moseley, Bobby Beathard and Charley Casserly. He broadcast games on the radio for the Washington Federals, a franchise that played in the United States Football League in 1983 and 1984.

Holliday has been the "voice" of the Maryland Terrapins football and men's basketball teams since 1979. He has broadcast more than 1,200 University of Maryland games, including twelve bowl games in football, as well as ten Sweet Sixteen and two Final Four appearances for the basketball team, including Maryland's NCAA Championship basketball victory over Indiana in 2002.

From 2007 to 2018, Holliday hosted the Washington Nationals baseball team pre- and post-game shows on the Mid-Atlantic Sports Network (MASN), Nats Xtra, with analyst Ray Knight, and occasionally filled in as a substitute play-by-play announcer for Nationals games on MASN.

Holliday also contributes sports reports to the ABC Radio Network.

=== Announcer ===
On television, Holliday was the announcer of the NBC musical variety shows Hullabaloo and The Roger Miller Show in 1966. He has also been the announcer for ABC's This Week with David Brinkley, Sam Donaldson, and Cokie Roberts. Holliday was featured on the 1967–1968 CBS series Good Morning World.

== Acting career ==
On the stage, Holliday has appeared in more than thirty productions and was nominated for a Helen Hayes Award for best actor in a Washington, D.C., musical for his role in Me and My Girl.

== Awards and honors ==
The National Football Foundation & College Football Hall of Fame presented Holliday with the Chris Schenkel award in 2006 for his long and distinguished career broadcasting college football for the University of Maryland. In 2010, The Maryland Daily Record named him one of its "60 Influential Marylanders." The Washington Post columnist Leonard Shapiro named Holliday as his all-time best Washington sports radio broadcaster since 1970.

In 2014, Holliday was inducted into the Washington, D.C., Sports Hall of Fame.

== Author ==
Johnny Holliday, with Stephen Moore, published his autobiography Johnny Holliday: From Rock to Jock in 2002, ISBN 978-1582614618 and in 2006, Hoop Tales ISBN 0762739908 about the University of Maryland men's basketball team.
