= WAKS =

Contemporary hit radio station in Akron, Ohio, serving Cleveland

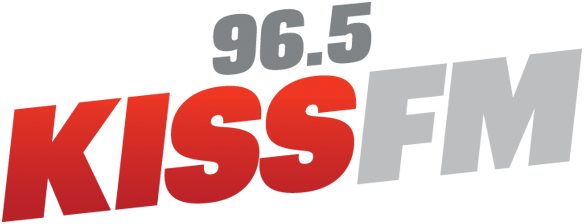
- Akron, Ohio; United States
- Broadcast area: Greater Cleveland; Northeast Ohio
- Frequency: 96.5 MHz (HD Radio)
- Branding: 96.5 KISS-FM

Programming
- Format: Contemporary hit radio
- Subchannels: HD2: Urban Contemporary
- Affiliations: Premiere Networks

Ownership
- Owner: iHeartMedia, Inc.; (iHM Licenses, LLC)
- Sister stations: WARF; WGAR-FM; WHLK; WMJI; WMMS; WTAM

History
- First air date: March 12, 1958
- Former call signs: WCUE-FM (1958–1977); WKDD (1977–2001)
- Call sign meaning: "KISS-FM"

Technical information
- Licensing authority: FCC
- Facility ID: 49952
- Class: B
- ERP: 31,000 watts
- HAAT: 189 meters (620 ft)
- Transmitter coordinates: 41°16′50.2″N 81°37′21.4″W
- Translator: HD2: 106.1 W291BV (Solon)

Links
- Public license information: Public file; LMS
- Webcast: Listen live (via iHeartRadio); Listen live (HD2)
- Website: kisscleveland.com; real1061cleveland (HD2)

WAKS (96.5 FM) is a commercial radio station licensed to Akron, Ohio, United States, featuring a contemporary hit radio format as "96.5 Kiss FM". Owned by iHeartMedia, WAKS serves Greater Cleveland, Northeast Ohio and the Akron metropolitan area. Although licensed to Akron, the station is assigned by Nielsen to the Cleveland radio market. Its studios are located in the Six Six Eight Building in Downtown Cleveland, and its transmitter is located in Brecksville. In addition to a standard analog transmission, WAKS transmits over two HD Radio subchannels and is available online via iHeartRadio; the station's second subchannel carries an urban contemporary format as "Real 106.1" and is relayed over low-power translator W291BV (106.1 FM) in Solon.

WAKS serves as the local affiliate for Elvis Duran and the Morning Show, On Air with Ryan Seacrest and American Top 40.

== History ==
=== WCUE-FM ===
On March 12, 1958, WCUE (1150 AM) of Cuyahoga Falls, Ohio, launched an FM sister station at 96.5 MHz in Akron. The call sign was WCUE-FM. At first, both stations would simulcast their programming.

Because WCUE was a daytimer station required to go off the air at night, WCUE-FM was able to continue broadcasting into the evening. The stations were network affiliates of the Mutual Broadcasting System and had their studios at 41 South Main Street in Akron.

=== WKDD ===
Logo as WKDD

In the early 1970s, WCUE-FM separated its programming from WCUE and was broadcasting an album oriented rock (AOR) format. In 1977, it adjusted its format to mellow rock and changed its call letters to WKDD. John Gorman, then program director at Cleveland rock station WMMS, recalls competing with WKDD in the Akron and Canton radio markets in its earlier days: "... the station attempted to create a 'Mellow Rock' mascot... "

In January 1982, WKDD dropped its mellow rock format and flipped to Top 40 (CHR). At the time, it was broadcasting at 50,000 watts, providing city-grade coverage to Cleveland, Akron and Canton. In 1989, the station briefly leaned towards rock hits, minimizing dance and pop. With that short move, WKDD unseated WMMS as the highest rated station in the Akron market, including both Summit and Portage counties, that same year. The station returned to its mainstream Top 40 format the following year. The two stations continued to struggle for ratings dominance well into the 1990s. Often, one of the two claimed the number one position in the Birch ratings service, while the other won Arbitron's top spot.

Danny Wright and Matt Patrick (Michael Ryan) were among the station's personalities. In 1987, WKDD raised Patrick's salary. He reportedly made nearly five times the average for all other personalities in the market. In 1995, Patrick attempted to leave WKDD for Cleveland station WLTF. This drew a legal fight from WKDD, which claimed Patrick's contract prevented him from leaving for any station within 40 miles (64 km) of WKDD.

=== 2001 frequency swap ===
On July 3, 2001, WKDD was one of seven Northeast Ohio stations involved in a complex exchange between three radio companies. Although generally reported as a "frequency swap", in reality these seven radio stations mostly traded call signs, formats and staffs – all to facilitate the transfers of ownership of four of the seven stations.

As part of this complex exchange, Clear Channel Communications changed the WKDD format from hot adult contemporary (hot AC) to Top 40 (CHR). It also relaunched the station using the KISS-FM brand and reassigned on and off-air personnel; on July 23, 2001, the call sign was changed to WAKS. In effect, this new WAKS licensed to Akron (96.5 FM) became the successor to the previous WAKS licensed to Lorain (104.9 FM).

On June 1, 2026, parent company iHeartMedia (Note: Clear Channel became iHeartMedia on September 16, 2014.) flipped WAKS to a near-simulcast of Premium Choice's Hit Nation network, featuring identical on-air playlists, as part of a mass nationalization across many of the company's radio stations. WAKS had been a gold-based CHR station since May 2025.

== Current programming ==
Weekday programming includes Elvis Duran and the Morning Show in morning drive and On Air with Ryan Seacrest middays, both via Premiere Networks.

All other music shifts are either voice-tracked out-of-market specifically for WAKS or programmed via Premium Choice.

On weekends, 96.5 KISS-FM airs several weekly syndicated programs: Since November 2001, WAKS carries American Top 40 on Sundays.

On Saturday evenings, two syndicated programs are heard: On The Move with Enrique Santos and Most Requested Live with Romeo.

== HD Radio ==
Logo for WAKS-HD2

WAKS has broadcast in HD Radio since April 25, 2006. By October 5, 2006, the station launched a second digital subchannel, initially carrying an underground dance format, then switched to tweener-oriented music and by 2008 had a dance format. Since December 11, 2018, WAKS-HD2 has carried a mainstream urban format as "Real 106.1"; The Breakfast Club, nationally syndicated via Premiere Networks, airs weekday mornings. WAKS-HD2 is also the FM flagship of the Cleveland Charge of the NBA G League.

WAKS-HD2 is additionally relayed over the following low-power translator:

Broadcast translator for WAKS-HD2
Call sign	Frequency	City of license	FID	ERP (W)	HAAT	Class	Transmitter coordinates	FCC info
W291BV	106.1 FM	Solon, Ohio	141400	200	261 m (856 ft)	D	41°22′45″N 81°43′11″W	LMS
