= Antlers Hotel (Lorain, Ohio) =

- U.S. National Register of Historic Places
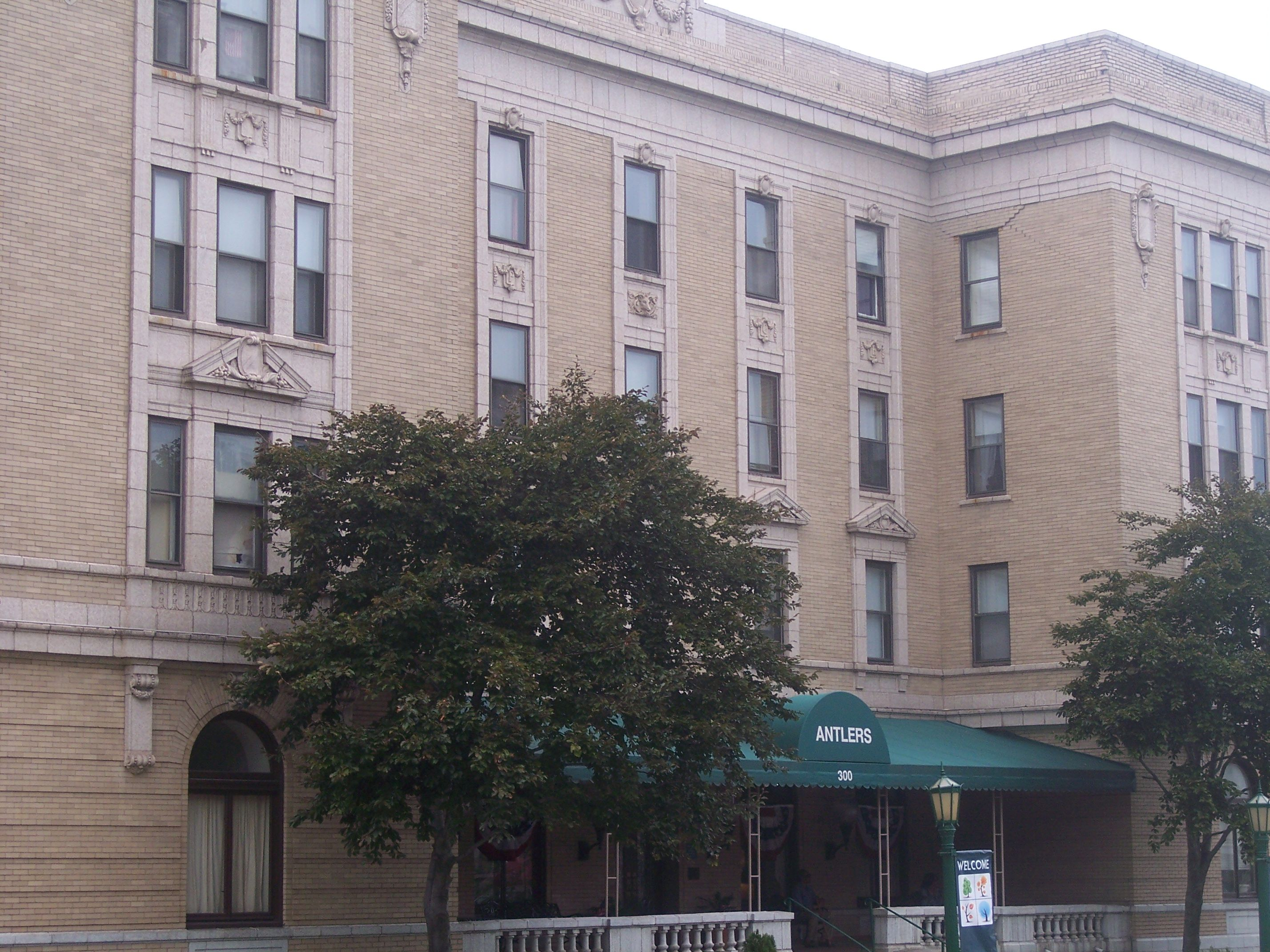
- Building in 2012

- Location within Ohio Location within the United States
- Location: Lorain, Ohio
- Coordinates: 41°28′3″N 82°10′50″W
- Built: 1922
- Architect: Paul Rissman
- Architectural style: Renaissance Revival
- Restored: 1986
- Restored by: Jon R. Veard
- NRHP reference No.: 82001470
- Added to NRHP: 30 November 1982

Antlers Hotel is a historic hotel building in Lorain, Ohio, it was listed on the National Register of Historic Places November 30, 1982.

== Building ==
The building sits on the southwest corner of Washington Avenue and West Erie Avenue overlooking a small city park. The four story rectangular building is 128 feet (39 m) by 100 feet (30 m) and has a basement. It was built in 1922 of tan brick having ornamental stone and terra cotta features in the Renaissance Revival style. A front porch is partially enclosed by bays projecting from each end of the facade. The porch features balusters and classic detailing which is also present around the windows. The 80 room hotel includes a large auditorium, lobby, restaurant space, kitchen, bar and laundry facilities. In 1982 the building had been vacant for some years and the interior had suffered significant damage, yet the exterior and structure remained intact and in good condition. It has been converted to a 40 unit apartment building.

== History ==
The largest and finest hotel built in Lorain, it was constructed by the local Elks Lodge No. 1301 as a money making venture and to serve as a facility for lodge functions and activities. It opened on August 22, 1922, with 87 rooms and a 1,200 person capacity auditorium. After the 1924 Lorain–Sandusky tornado a temporary branch of the Cleveland Trust bank was opened in the hotel. One of the oldest Alcoholics Anonymous meetings started on October 22, 1941, in the Antlers Hotel. Construction of the Ohio Turnpike and Interstate 90 coupled with motels built in the suburbs led decline for the Antlers Hotel and it was vacant from mid-1974 to 1986 when it was restored.

== Modern times ==
A holding company, Lorain Inc., bought the hotel in 1960 and sold it to Olimpio and Leona Giannini in 1966. Olimpio Giannini was charged (in 1967 and later convicted) with keeping a place for prostitution and a 15–year old girl was charged as a prostitute for the hotel. The hotel was boarded up from 1974 to 1985 when the city guaranteed about US$672,500 (equivalent to $2,013,130 in 2025) of low interest federal loans so Jon R. Veard could purchase and restore the building. It was opened as an apartment building in 1986 and as of 2013 it was maintaining near full occupancy mostly with senior residents.

== See also ==
- Child prostitution
- Historic preservation
- History of Alcoholics Anonymous
- National Register of Historic Places listings in Lorain County, Ohio
- Urban decay – Urban renewal
