= WARW (FM) =

Air 1 radio station in Port Chester, New York

- Port Chester, New York; United States
- Broadcast area: New York City; Westchester County; Connecticut Panhandle
- Frequency: 96.7 MHz (HD Radio)
- Branding: Air1

Programming
- Format: Christian worship
- Subchannels: HD2: K-Love Pop; (Christian contemporary hit radio); HD3: Radio Nueva Vida (Spanish Christian)
- Network: Air1

Ownership
- Owner: Educational Media Foundation; (K-LOVE, Inc.)
- Sister stations: WPLJ

History
- First air date: 1947
- Former call signs: WSTC-FM (1947–1974); WYRS (1974–1987); WJAZ (1987–1990); WQQQ (1990–1992); WKHL (1992–2006); WCTZ (2006–2011); WKLV-FM (2011–2019); WMKQ (July 2019)
- Call sign meaning: Air1

Technical information
- Licensing authority: FCC
- Facility ID: 10659
- Class: A
- ERP: 3,100 watts
- HAAT: 143 meters (469 ft)
- Transmitter coordinates: 40.912°N 73.782°W

Links
- Public license information: Public file; LMS
- Webcast: Listen live
- Website: www.air1.com

WARW is a Christian worship formatted radio station, licensed to serve Port Chester, New York, owned by Educational Media Foundation. It is the Air 1 radio outlet for New York City, Westchester County, and the Connecticut Panhandle. The station's transmitter is located in New Rochelle, New York.

== History ==
WARW went on the air in 1947 as WSTC-FM licensed to Stamford, Connecticut, and simulcasting WSTC. On February 19, 1974, the call letters were changed to WYRS and the station began programming an automated beautiful music format aimed at women using the moniker "Yours 96.7". At 6:00 p.m. on September 2, 1980, WYRS switched to a jazz format after WRVR in New York City had switched formats from jazz to country music. On December 17, 1981, the station was sold to Radio Stamford Inc. The call letters were changed to WJAZ in 1987. In 1990, the format was changed to an oldies format of songs from 1954 to 1973 and the call letters changed to WQQQ with branding as "Q-96.7". From 1992 to 2006, the station was known as WKHL, branded as "Kool 96.7", with no change in format. On March 29, 2006, the station changed from oldies to classic hits as 96.7 The Coast under the WCTZ calls. The FCC approved an allocations shift to Port Chester, New York, in December 2006 which allowed the station greater access to New York City; at the time, the station still marketed itself strictly to a Fairfield County audience.

On November 5, 2010, Educational Media Foundation announced they would be purchasing WCTZ and moving the transmitter to the Trump Plaza in New Rochelle, serving as the K-Love affiliate for New York City with the call letters WKLV-FM; the sale was completed in mid-May 2011, after which the station went silent for a few weeks to relocate its transmitter.

On February 13, 2019, WPLJ and five other Cumulus Media stations were sold to the Rocklin, California-based nonprofit broadcaster, Educational Media Foundation (EMF) for $103.5 million. After the sale received final approval by the FCC, EMF announced that WPLJ and the other Cumulus stations acquired would all begin broadcasting K-Love on June 1 at midnight local time; this was later moved up to May 31 at 7:00 pm, five hours earlier than originally planned.

EMF's acquisition of WPLJ created a duopoly for their non-profit enterprise in the New York City market. Between May 31 and July 10, 2019, EMF programmed both WKLV-FM and WPLJ with K-Love programming, but this was not a true simulcast, as a time-delay existed between both stations. On July 11, 2019, the duplicated programming arrangement ceased as EMF swapped the WKLV-FM call-sign with their K-Love affiliate for Butler, Alabama, WMKQ. Simultaneously, EMF discontinued K-Love programming over 96.7 FM and replaced it with a looping message stating that K-Love programming for the New York City market had moved exclusively to WPLJ and that sister network Air 1 would soon be launched on 96.7. On July 19, 2019, Air 1 programming began on the station, which concurrently changed its call letters to WARW (transferred from the Air 1 station in Remsen, New York). On July 26, 2019, WARW moved "K-Love Classics" from 96.7 HD-3 to 96.7 HD-2, and Radio Nueva Vida started broadcasting on the HD3 subchannel.
