= Marlin Maddoux =

American radio broadcaster (1933–2004)

- Born: Robert Marlin Maddoux; May 4, 1933; Fletcher, Texas, U.S.
- Died: March 4, 2004 (aged 70); Irving, Texas, U.S.
- Resting place: Restland Memorial Park; Dallas, Texas, U.S.
- Spouse: Mary Maddox
- Career
- Show: Point Of View
- Network: USA Radio Network
- Style: Talk radio
- Country: United States

Robert Marlin Maddoux (May 4, 1933 – March 4, 2004) was an American pioneer in broadcasting. Maddoux was the host of Point of View radio talk show, the founder and president of the USA Radio Network and the National Center for Freedom & Renewal (formerly International Christian Media), Alliance Defense Fund co-founder as well as a noted journalist and author.

== Career ==
Maddoux was founder and host of Point of View radio talk show, which began in 1972 and is broadcast daily via satellite on 250 American radio stations nationwide and around the world by shortwave. He was a pioneer in the talk radio industry with Point of View's hard-hitting issues-oriented talk format. For more than thirty years, Point of View has covered the full spectrum of issues and current events that affect homes, beliefs, schools, government, churches and basic freedoms from a Christian perspective. In 1986, Maddoux received the National Religious Broadcasters Award of Merit. In 1994, Christianity Today magazine called Point of View America's "most popular live Christian call-in show."

In 1985, Maddoux founded USA Radio Network. In 1994, the National Religious Broadcasters awarded the USA Radio Network its "Program Producer of the Year" Award. Marlin Maddoux was inducted into the National Religious Broadcasters Hall of Fame in 2007.

In 1994, along with the presidents of Campus Crusade for Christ (Bill Bright), Focus on the Family (James Dobson), Christian Financial Concepts (Larry Burkett), American Family Association (Donald Wildmon, and Coral Ridge Ministries (D. James Kennedy), Maddoux supported the founding of the Alliance Defense Fund.

Maddoux described the Christian radio industry as "a First Amendment stronghold against a liberal and secular press."

== Books ==
He is the author of several nonfiction books and one novel.

=== Nonfiction ===
- — (1 July 1984). America Betrayed. Huntington House, Inc. ISBN 978-0910311182. OCLC 11824565. OL 2873325M.
- — (1 February 1990). Free Speech or Propaganda?: How the Media Distorts the Truth. Thomas Nelson. ISBN 978-0840772381. OCLC 1098799610. OL 1922673M – via Internet Archive.
- — (1 January 1992). What Worries Parents Most. Harvest House. ISBN 978-0890819333. OCLC 25131435. OL 1565733M.
- —; Corbett, Christopher (1993). A Christian Agenda: Game Plan for a New Era. International Christian Media. OCLC 34040832.
- —; Corbett, Christopher (1994). Answers to the Gay Deception. International Christian Media. ASIN B000O6JVQ4.
- — (2 March 2006). Public Education Against America: The Hidden Agenda. Whitaker House. ISBN 978-0883688137. OCLC 64098348. OL 8191446M – via Internet Archive. (published posthumously)

=== Novels ===
- — (1 August 1998). Seal of Gaia: A Novel of the Antichrist. Thomas Nelson. ISBN 978-0849916045. LCCN 98036612. OCLC 39545627. OL 374785M.
