= WLBJ (FM) =

K-Love radio station in Butler, Alabama

- Butler, Alabama; United States
- Broadcast area: Meridian, Mississippi
- Frequency: 93.5 MHz
- Branding: K-Love

Programming
- Format: Christian adult contemporary
- Affiliations: K-Love

Ownership
- Owner: Educational Media Foundation

History
- First air date: 1978
- Former call signs: WQGL (1978); WQGL-FM (1978–1982); WQGL (1982–1997); WKZB (1997–2005); WMLV (2005–2015); WMLG (2015–2017); WCLR (2017–2018); WMKQ (2018–2019); WKLV-FM (2019–2025); WFHM-FM (2025)
- Call sign meaning: "L.B. Jenkins" (formerly used on WLBJ in Bowling Green, Kentucky)

Technical information
- Licensing authority: FCC
- Facility ID: 7903
- Class: C2
- ERP: 32,000 watts
- HAAT: 186 meters (610 ft)
- Transmitter coordinates: 32°9′26″N 88°29′17″W

Links
- Public license information: Public file; LMS
- Webcast: Listen live
- Website: www.klove.com

WLBJ (93.5 FM) is a non-commercial educational radio station licensed to Butler, Alabama, United States. The station is owned by Educational Media Foundation (EMF) and airs the contemporary Christian music-formatted K-Love network.

== Programming ==
The station is broadcasting a contemporary Christian music format to the Meridian, Mississippi, area.

== History ==
Butler Broadcasting Corporation received the original construction permit from the Federal Communications Commission (FCC) in 1978 for a new FM station broadcasting with 3,000 watts of effective radiated power on 93.5 MHz. The new station was assigned the call letters WQGL by the FCC. On September 11, 1978, the same day the station applied to the FCC for its license to cover, the owners received new call letters WQGL-FM. WQGL-FM received its license to cover from the FCC on July 30, 1979. On April 8, 1992, the station returned to the unadorned WQGL callsign.

On May 4, 1995, the FCC granted this station a construction permit to move their transmitter site, raise their antenna, and upgrade their broadcast power to 25,000 watts. These upgrades were completed in May 1997 and the station changed call letters to WKZB on June 9, 1997.

In June 2002, Butler Broadcasting Corporation (Darryl Jackson, president) reached an agreement to sell this station to East Mississippi Broadcasters, Inc., a wholly owned subsidiary of Holladay Broadcasting (Bob Holladay, president), for a reported sale price of $771,500. The deal was approved by the FCC on August 16, 2002, and the transaction was consummated on October 30, 2002. At the time of the sale, WKZB broadcast a classic rock music format.

This change would prove short-lived as in early December 2003, Holladay Broadcasting' East Mississippi Broadcasters, Inc., agreed to transfer the broadcast license for this station to Holladay Broadcasting-owned Mississippi Broadcasters LLC. The deal was approved by the FCC on December 10, 2003, and the transaction was consummated on January 1, 2004. Under the new ownership, the station again changed callsigns, this time to WMLV, on July 1, 2005.

In September 2011, WMLV was sold to Educational Media Foundation (EMF) and went temporarily silent. On October 4, 2011, WMLV returned to the air with EMF's K-Love contemporary Christian format.

The station changed its call sign to WMLG on July 17, 2015, as the WMLV call sign was moved to a station EMF had just acquired in Miami, Florida. The station changed its call sign again on June 2, 2017, to WCLR. On November 30, 2018, the station's call sign was changed to WMKQ. On July 11, 2019, WMKQ swapped call signs with WKLV-FM in Port Chester, New York. On February 1, 2025, the station swapped call signs with WFHM-FM in Cleveland, Ohio. Soon after, on April 22, 2025, the call sign was changed to WLBJ.
