= Point of View (radio show) =

US radio talk show

- Running time: 2 hours
- Country of origin: United States
- Language(s): English
- Starring: Kerby Anderson; Penna Dexter; Kelly Shackelford
- Created by: Marlin Maddoux
- Original release: 1972; 53 years ago
- Website: pointofview.net

Point of View is a syndicated, daily (Monday through Friday) Christian issues talk show which can be heard over 360 radio stations throughout the continental U.S.A. It was founded by Marlin Maddoux, who was the show's main host from its 1972 premiere until 2003, when the co-host, Kerby Anderson, took over, with Penna Dexter as co-host.

Point of View is a two-hour, issues-oriented live talk radio program heard daily nationwide, in a "discussion forum" style (as opposed to a "monologue" style popular among talk radio shows). Anderson and the Point of View team cover a variety of issues from a conservative perspective. It includes daily interviews and interaction with guests including authors, politicians, opinion leaders, conservative activists, and subject matter experts.

Christianity Today magazine called Point of View America's "most popular live Christian call-in show."
