= Weekend Radio =

Radio variety show

- Country of origin: United States
- Language: English
- Home station: WCLV
- Syndicates: Ideastream
- Hosted by: Robert Conrad
- Original release: 1982 – September 2023
- Website: www.ideastream.org/topics/weekend-radio

Weekend Radio is a radio variety show hosted by Robert Conrad; its flagship station is WCLV in Cleveland, Ohio. The program offers a mixture of light classical music with audio essays and comedy recordings.

Weekend Radio is syndicated and runs for an hour on many National Public Radio-affiliated stations throughout the United States.

The opening and closing theme music is the last movement ("Le Bal") of Georges Bizet's Jeux d'enfants (Bizet), arranged for wind quintet by G Davies.

The show ceased airing following the 2023 Labor Day weekend. The decision was made to stop production rather than potentially violating the terms of a music rights agreement made by NPR, PBS, and CPB.
