= WKLV-FM =

K-Love radio station in Cleveland

- Cleveland, Ohio; United States
- Broadcast area: Greater Cleveland
- Frequency: 95.5 MHz (HD Radio)
- Branding: K-Love

Programming
- Format: Christian contemporary
- Subchannels: HD2: K-Love Eras; HD3: Air1
- Network: K-Love

Ownership
- Owner: Educational Media Foundation; (K-Love, Inc.)

History
- Founded: September 20, 1960
- First air date: April 10, 1961 (Note: Some sources, including the Broadcasting Yearbook, have incorrectly listed the sign-on date as April 1, 1960.)
- Former call signs: WDGO (1961–1962); WCLV (1962–2001); WHK-FM (2001); WFHM-FM (2001–2025)
- Call sign meaning: K-Love

Technical information
- Licensing authority: FCC
- Facility ID: 54778
- Class: B
- ERP: 31,000 watts
- HAAT: 189 meters (620 ft)
- Transmitter coordinates: 41°26′32.2″N 81°29′27.4″W

Links
- Public license information: Public file; LMS
- Webcast: Listen live
- Website: klove.com

WKLV-FM (95.5 FM) is a non-commercial radio station licensed to Cleveland, Ohio, United States, airing a Christian contemporary format as the Cleveland affiliate for K-Love. Owned by the Educational Media Foundation (EMF) d/b/a K-Love Inc., the station serves Greater Cleveland and much of surrounding Northeast Ohio. WKLV-FM's transmitter is located in Warrensville Heights.

This station was built and signed on by Douglas G. Ovaitt Sr. and Jr. as WDGO in 1961. Sold twice in the following year, the second sale was to Cecil "Pat" Patrick and Robert Conrad, who relaunched the station in November 1962 as WCLV. Featuring a fine arts and classical music format, WCLV began originating live broadcasts of the Cleveland Orchestra in 1965, which it and its successor stations have continued in the years since. The station also launched an annual fundraising drive marathon for the Orchestra in 1970, which was soon imitated in other markets. Announcer Martin Perlich became an early champion of progressive rock with the Friday night Perlich Project, the first such program of its kind in Cleveland radio. Soloist A. Grace Lee Mims hosted a long-running weekly series devoted to contributions to the fine arts made by African Americans. WCLV became the home station for Karl Haas' Adventures in Good Music and the City Club of Cleveland's Friday Forum, establishing a radio syndication unit for those and other programs including Weekend Radio, an extension of a Saturday night variety show Conrad hosted.

With studios and transmitter originally in Mayfield Heights, the station upgraded its signal twice, moving facilities to the top of the Terminal Tower in 1968 and again to Warrensville Heights in 1986. Widespread consolidation in the late 1990s resulted in WCLV becoming the only commercial radio station licensed to the city that was still locally owned. To perpetuate the classical format, Conrad initiated a complex seven-station intellectual property and asset swap in 2001, selling the 95.5 FM signal to Salem Communications in exchange for 1420 AM from Salem and 104.9 FM from Clear Channel. Upon taking over on July 3, 2001, Salem relaunched 95.5 FM as WFHM-FM, with a Christian contemporary format as "The Fish", whose airstaff included several veteran personalities formerly associated with secular radio formats. The station was sold to EMF in January 2025 and consequently switched to carrying K-Love.

== Classical era (1961–2001) ==
=== Establishment as WDGO ===
Douglas G. Ovaitt, Jr., half of a father-son real estate developer team from Geauga County (father Douglas Ovaitt, Sr. was also the mayor of South Euclid), filed paperwork with the Federal Communications Commission (FCC) on February 3, 1960, to construct a radio station at 95.5 MHz, and was granted a construction permit on September 20. Ovaitt originally considered building an AM station in Chardon, Ohio, but began pursuing an FM station after realizing the signal limitations of an AM facility. Named after both father and son, WDGO's transmitter and studios were co-located at Eastgate Shopping Center in Mayfield Heights, where Ovaitt constructed several storefronts. The 95.5 MHz frequency became available for broadcasting after WCUY in Cleveland Heights moved from 95.3 FM to 92.3 FM following a transmitter and power upgrade.

WDGO took to the air on April 10, 1961, carrying a fine art format focused on classical music. Plain Dealer critic Russell W. Kane lauded their intent but questioned its commercial viability, saying, "... right or wrong, they are entering an area with laws just as inexorable as those of the real jungle, laws that The Law and Mr. Jones is finding tough to repeal or evade." The station's classical programming was supplemented by concert recordings from the International Good Music service. WDGO also featured a daily afternoon program oriented towards school-aged children. Ovaitt Sr.'s wife owned French poodles and included one of them on station letterhead, giving rise to the transposed misidentification of "WDOG".

The Ovaitts sold WDGO to Janssen Broadcasting Company on November 17, 1961; Ovaitt, Jr. retained a minority ownership stake. Under Janssen ownership, WDGO began broadcasting in multiplexed stereo, and identified any monaural recordings for the benefit of listeners tuning into the station with stereo equipment. WDGO's stereo signal, however, encountered multiple weak spots due to the transmitter being in Mayfield Heights instead of a more centralized location like Seven Hills or North Royalton. WDGO was also the only FM station in Cleveland to broadcast classical music full-time, as other signals only programmed classical on a part-time basis.

=== Sale to Radio Seaway, change to WCLV ===
WDGO was sold for the second time in less than a year in August 1962 to Radio Seaway, Inc., a partnership headed by the station's sales manager Cecil K. "Pat" Patrick, and Robert Conrad, program director and co-founder of Detroit classical station WDTM. Patrick considered buying the station but had no experience in programming, and was introduced to Conrad from his network of contacts. Approved on October 18, 1962, the sale price was misidentified as $38,000, which Patrick corrected to $80,000.

Intending to create a new image for the station, Patrick and Conrad requested new WCLV calls; as Conrad told the Plain Dealer, "... some of the announcers have trouble saying WDGO, and some of our listeners address us as WDOG, and even WGOD." Patrick and Conrad chose WCLV after realizing no other station in Cleveland was named after the city, and were inspired by WNYC in New York City, WDET-FM in Detroit and WBUF in Buffalo, New York. The WCLV calls took effect on November 1, 1962; programming on that day included a Unity Center meditation, Broadway show tunes, folk music, and a recording of Romeo and Juliet starring Claire Bloom and Albert Finney. Patrick and Conrad promised to maintain the existing classical format, along with adding more live programming and linking with New York station WQXR-FM. The station operated at a loss financially for the first four years under Patrick and Conrad, with both earning less money than the other staff, and operated with frugality.

WCLV launched their signature program, Symphony at Seven, on October 5, 1964, with Cleveland Trust as the title sponsor; Cleveland Trust's sponsorship was the largest such contract in the station's history to that point and it, along with the program, continues to this day through successor banks Ameritrust, Society Bank and KeyBank. Heinen's became the title sponsor of Morning at the Pops on February 4, 1965, and eventually the title sponsor for the evening Concert Hall, the latter airing nightly over WCLV and its successor station through 2003. The Cleveland Catholic Diocese leased a WCLV SCA subchannel beginning in 1965 to offer in-school instructional programming. Commercials with jingles were generally rejected as they did not fit the image of the station.

=== A classical music mainstay ===
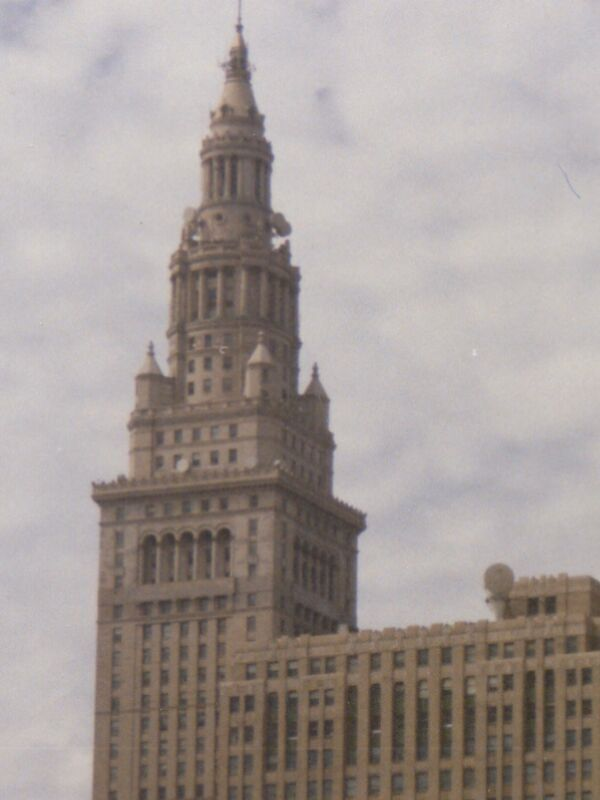
WCLV's studios and transmitter mast were located at the Terminal Tower from 1968 until 1986.

Conrad and Patrick welcomed competition from other FM stations that carried classical music, believing it would improve all the stations and provide additional listenership, and successfully persuaded NBC to retain the format over KYW-FM when they retook ownership of the station as WKYC-FM. This coincided with an overall move of classical from AM to FM; while two other FM stations still had classical by 1967, only WCLV featured live programming. WCLV added Metropolitan Opera radio broadcasts in 1969 after WGAR dropped it, becoming the first FM-only affiliate in the Opera's network of AM stations. (Note: This was not the first time the Metropolitan Opera broadcasts had an FM-only affiliate; WJW-FM carried the Opera for one month in late 1957 when WJW planned to disaffiliate from distributor ABC Radio.) The Opera broadcasts were mono-only until 1973, when the network began offering them in stereo; the Opera continues to be heard over WCLV's successor station into the present day. The City Club of Cleveland's Friday Forum moved to WCLV on October 9, 1970, after WGAR also dropped it. The Friday Forum originated over WCLV and its successor station until 2008, when it moved to WCPN.

The station's reception issues worsened in the mid-1960s, when WLDM in Detroit (which also broadcast at 95.5 FM) underwent a power increase. WCLV's transmitter was thus moved to downtown Cleveland's Terminal Tower in 1968, with the antenna mounted on the tower's flagpole; new studios were constructed in the tower's fifteenth floor. Patrick estimated the new transmitter would add up to 300,000 potential listeners and improve reception both in downtown and to the west of Cleveland. WCLV's transmitter height increased from 212 feet (65 m) at Eastgate to 752 feet (229 m) at the Tower, but it came with a reduction in transmitter power output to 8.9 kW, and 21.9 kW vertical effective radiated power, in order to protect WLDM.

WCLV was among the first FM stations in the market to broadcast continuously through the overnight hours. The Friday overnight slot took a much different tone with booth announcer Martin Perlich. A graduate of Columbia University and University of Chicago and a student at Juilliard School, Perlich debuted The Perlich Project in late 1966, a mixture of classical with progressive rock selections along with interviews, personal comments and editorials on events of the day. The Perlich Project was one of the earliest such shows on commercial radio in Cleveland, as similar shows debuted over ethnic station WZAK and Top 40 station WIXY, both in the overnight hours. Perlich also hosted Audition Booth, devoted to newer classical recordings, operated local music store chain Discount Records and once conducted interviews with Orchestra director George Szell and Pink Floyd in the same hour. Perlich was dismissed from WCLV in October 1970 after growing facial hair that ran counter to the Orchestra's public image, and subsequently joined WNCR.

WCLV started recording performances by the Cleveland Orchestra in 1963, and began airing the Orchestra's 4 p.m. Sunday afternoon concerts on November 1, 1965, both live and live to tape with Conrad as host and commentator. This followed similar moves made by the Philadelphia Orchestra and the Boston Symphony Orchestra. This marked a return to live radio for the Orchestra as WGAR originated broadcasts for CBS Radio from 1941 to 1962. WCLV invested heavily in recording equipment at Severance Hall, owing to the demands of then-director Szell. Prior to the first broadcast, Conrad and Perlich co-anchored live coverage of the Orchestra's return to Cleveland from a tour in Europe and the Soviet Union. The Orchestra immediately boasted affiliates in the United States and Canada, and on both commercial and non-commercial educational stations; revenue generated from the tape rentals went to the Orchestra's pension fund. Patrick led the drive to acquire the Orchestra, later saying, "I wanted people in the street to hear it. I thought I'd be doing something great for the arts. I never thought of syndication, but it exploded." Conrad remained as lead commentator for the Orchestra broadcasts through the late 2010s, a record in American radio.

Seaway Productions was established in 1981, with Dennis Miller—a former manager at WKSU-FM in Kent—hired as syndication vice president. Along with the Orchestra, WCLV syndicated broadcasts of the Detroit Symphony, the Royal Amsterdam Concertgebouw Orchestra, the Rotterdam Philharmonic and the San Francisco Symphony, along with the Friday Forum. A satellite network for program distribution was set up in conjunction with WFMT in Chicago; Seaway Productions had four syndication clients by 1981, which grew to 17 by 1992 and distributed programs to 550 stations by 1995. WCLV also began producing and syndicating Adventures in Good Music, which Karl Haas created for WJR in Detroit, on March 22, 1970. It was, at its peak, one of the most-listened-to classical music programs in the world. While Haas still considered WJR his flagship station as late as 1977, the program was largely recorded at Carnegie Hall and WCLV received all fan mail. Haas continued producing new episodes of Adventures in Good Music until his retirement in 2002, while reruns continued airing until 2007, two years after his death.

WKSU-FM, which carried a mix of National Public Radio (NPR), classical, and jazz, upgraded their signal to reach Cleveland to take advantage of a public radio vacancy in the market. (Note: See WCLV § Cleveland's public radio vacancy (1978–1984).) A feud between Conrad and WKSU general manager John Perry emerged in 1982; Conrad claimed a verbal agreement existed to provide WCLV with NPR programming including a radio adaptation of the first Star Wars film trilogy (which commercial stations could do due to an NPR rule change) but was rescinded, Perry claimed no agreement was made and the NPR board rejected Conrad's request. in response, Conrad pulled from WKSU the Chicago Symphony, the Milwaukee Symphony and New York Philharmonic, threatened to pull the Metropolitan Opera, and WCLV aired promos promoting their commercial status. WCLV also threatened to deny WKSU further broadcast rights to the Cleveland Orchestra. Don Robertson of the Cleveland Press criticized WCLV for both the feud with WKSU and their loosening of standards for advertising, considering the commercials "fatuous junk" and "so bad, they're unreal". The dispute was largely settled at the end of 1982, with WKSU being allowed to continue airing the Cleveland Orchestra broadcasts, but on Saturday mornings.

Conrad enacted a rule forbidding the playing of recordings with sopranos until 9 a.m. daily; the "Conrad No Soprano Until 9 Rule" persisted into the early 2010s. Another policy forbade recordings from recent composers during drive time hours out of concern they would alienate the audience. Composer Donald Erb took offense to this and to a remark by Conrad that modern composers are "speaking Swahili", prompting Erb to distribute bumper stickers reading "WCLV Kiwachosa" (WCLV is Boring). After moving to Dallas to lead the American Music Center, Erb denounced Conrad for "pompous contentiousness" in a newsletter editorial, while Conrad said in reply, "we are probably the only radio station in Ohio that plays Erb's music". The station collaborated with the Cleveland Composer Guild in 1998 for Not The Dead White Male Composers Hour, showcasing music from active area composers; the humorous title was a direct nod to Not the Nine O'Clock News while also reflecting Conrad's sensibilities.

WCLV became the first radio station in the region to utilize compact discs for recordings in mid-1983, followed by WMMS and WKSU. The station's studios were moved again to Warrensville Heights on September 30, 1986, in a $2 million investment. This originally included unveiling a new 470-foot (140 m) tower and power increase expected to improve reception to the west, east and south of Cleveland, particularly in the Akron area, but technical issues delayed the transmitter move until later in 1987. WCLV's tower, which also housed the mast for 92.3 FM in Cleveland Heights, was also opened up to rentals for other broadcasters; by 1992, up to 60 different antenna were mounted onto the tower, creating an additional revenue stream for Radio Seaway.

In September 1995, WCLV won the National Association of Broadcasters' Marconi Award for Classical Music Station of the Year, followed days later by the Gabriel Award for radio station of the year. During the Cleveland Browns relocation controversy, WCLV aired promos boasting they were "the radio home of the team that wins every time it plays, and will not move to Baltimore: the Cleveland Orchestra". Tying to the start of the 1996 Cleveland Indians season, WCLV featured a Bach and Baseball marathon, combining works from Bach with classic baseball recordings and highlights.

=== Cleveland Orchestra fundraiser marathons ===
In 1970, WCLV began an annual on-air fundraiser for the Cleveland Orchestra, pre-empting regular programming for one weekend in favor of requested Orchestra recordings. The first marathon raised over $30,000 in a 54-hour span. Prior to this, any outstanding debt from the Orchestra was covered by board members who would draw names from a hat, and the board approached WCLV to consider an alternative. WCLV was no stranger to such marathons: it devoted much of October 1970 to air recordings from George Szell after his death, and aired a 17-day marathon of recordings from Lorin Maazel after he became Orchestra conductor in 1971. Guest conductors and musicians during the marathons have ranged from Mitch Miller to Bobby McFerrin.

The Orchestra fundraiser marathon quickly became a WCLV fixture and inspired similar fundraisers elsewhere, in particular WCRB's efforts for the Boston Symphony. By 1973, the Orchestra fundraisers were moved from the WCLV studios to Westgate Mall and Severance Center. Within the first 25 years of the fundraiser marathon's existence, WCLV raised up to $3.7 million total for the Orchestra. Conrad told the Plain Dealer in 1971, "the Orchestra is to WCLV what the Browns are to [then-radio flagship] WHK".

=== WCLV Saturday Night ===
On Saturday night, WCLV presented an eclectic program of folk, novelty music and comedy—primarily British comedy—titled WCLV Saturday Night, hosted by Conrad; it debuted on WDGO four weeks prior to the change to WCLV. The program typically aired live on Saturdays and rebroadcast on Wednesdays as WCLV Saturday Night on Wednesday Afternoon, but the inverse occurred whenever Conrad emceed Saturday night Orchestra concerts at Blossom Music Center, a practice that continued for nearly 25 years. Area jewelry store chain owner Larry Robinson (who later became a radio station owner), served as the program's title sponsor in 1965. The show was credited for being the first on American radio to play recordings from Monty Python, The Goon Show and P. D. Q. Bach, and was described as an "evangelistic lifeline for younger listeners" by the Akron Beacon Journal and "has to be heard to be appreciated" by the Plain Dealer.

WCLV Saturday Night spawned an hourlong syndicated version in 1982 titled Weekend Radio. By 1990, Conrad retired the local program in favor of the hourlong show, later telling the Plain Dealer, "my wife grew tired of being a Saturday night widow".

=== Airstaff continuity and stability ===
From their relaunch as WCLV, the station boasted an airstaff that had significant stability. Tony Bianchi befriended Conrad when the two worked together in Detroit and was present for Conrad and Patrick signing the paperwork purchasing WDGO in 1962, but was drafted the next day. Conrad's invitation to Bianchi was open-ended and he debuted on Labor Day 1964. Bianchi's shift was dubbed Gassenhauer in 1972 after the musical piece of the same name and represented the first major attempt for on-air talent to show personality, which proved a ratings success. Albert Petrak, who previously programmed KYW-FM/WKYC-FM, became WCLV's morning host in 1973, credited for increasing the station's visibility in mornings and known for his daily "up, up, up" exhortation to listeners. Petrak left briefly in 1977 for a managerial role at WQED-FM, but returned in six months. John Simna, who also joined WCLV in 1973, took over as music director from Petrak in 1977, a role he continues to hold. Simna also took over the weekend program Jazz comes to WCLV in 1978 from original host Christopher Colombi.

Wayne Mack, an announcer in Cleveland radio since 1931, joined WCLV in 1981; initially hosting the late-evening program, he later helmed Noontime throughout the 1990s. Mack also produced a perennial series of big band concert recreations—a concept he originated while at WDOK AM-FM and carried over to WCLV—filled with sound effects and detailed descriptions of the imaginary locations and guests, often fooling listeners into believing the concerts were real. The Press's Don Robertson equated Mack's stature to that of Walter Cronkite, saying, "his voice is instantly recognizable; it has a calm and a benevolence that is positively buttery, its professionalism is wondrous to hear". The station hired veteran newsman Hugh Danaceau in November 1980 to be their first news anchor; Danaceau continued in this position until his death in 2003. WCLV's unusual level of continuity among their airstaff resulted in Danaceau being described as "one of the newest hires" in 2000, nineteen years after his debut.

In 1976, soloist A. Grace Lee Mims approached Conrad about hosting a show on WCLV devoted to contributions to fine arts, classical music and jazz made by African Americans, feeling it would accentuate the station's ethnic programming. Black Arts debuted over WCLV on May 8, 1976. Conrad offered her the show under the condition she hosted it for at least six months. Mims also hosted the daily interview program Arts Log from 1980 to 2010. She continued to write, produce and host Black Arts over WCLV and its successor station for 43 years until her death in 2019.

Rebecca Fischer joined WCLV in November 1979 as the station's first female announcer, moving to Cleveland from Kansas City after meeting Conrad at a fundraiser marathon there. Aside from a brief ten-month stint in Europe, Fisher became a fixture at the station and took over as morning host in 1989 following Petrak's retirement, initiating their first major schedule change in 12 years. Owing to family commitments, Fischer left the station in March 2000, prompting a nationwide search for her replacement. Jacqueline Gerber succeeded Fischer as First Program host in April 2001, a role she continues to hold. Gerber's arrival coincided with Tony Bianchi's retirement, concluding for him a 37-year run at WCLV. Mack retired from WCLV in 1998, but taped reruns of past shows continued until his death on October 15, 2000, at age 89.

Bill O'Connell was named program director in early 1998, the second in its history and succeeding Conrad; under O'Connell, the station instituted the five-hour Monday Music Marathon, eschewing all commercials and most on-air announcements aside from the noon BBC World Service bulletin. The change ran contrary to other large-market classical stations that emphasized shorter pieces in the daytime. By 2001, O'Connell became the afternoon drive host, succeeding Bianchi.

=== Industry consolidation challenges ===
Rapid consolidation in radio ownership took place throughout 1998 in Cleveland, punctuated by one transaction where three local operators collectively sold six stations to Chancellor Broadcasting for a combined $275 million. WCLV thus became the lone remaining commercial radio station licensed to Cleveland that was still locally owned. As Conrad told the Plain Dealer, "the glory days for radio in this town are over". The station poked fun of their new distinction with print advertising that read, "when it's raining on the North Coast, only one Cleveland FM radio station owner actually gets wet."

In 1989, 41 commercial radio stations in the United States carried a classical format. By 2000, the number dropped to 33, and followed high-profile format switches by commercial classical stations in Los Angeles, New York, Chicago, Philadelphia and Detroit, in addition to a threatened switch in Miami. Conrad told the Miami Herald "tens of millions" were offered by various groups for WCLV, but declined every time "... because WCLV is not a commodity, but a community service for the Cleveland Orchestra, the opera and ballet. It also has longtime employees who'd have difficulty getting jobs in any other kind of radio. So why sell it? We make a very good living." Conrad said in 1997 that while the station could generate more revenue with a more commercially accessible format, "we choose to be a classical music station ... it is a matter of our corporate will."

== The 2001 "frequency swap" ==
Grade A signal contours for 104.9 FM (blue), located in Avon, and 95.5 FM (red), located in Warrensville Heights.

On November 1, 2000, the 38th anniversary of WDGO's call sign change to WCLV, Radio Seaway announced the station's intellectual property and format would be donated to a newly established nonprofit organization. To enable the donation, Radio Seaway sold WCLV's broadcast license to Salem Communications and purchased both the licenses to WHK (1420 AM) from Salem and WAKS (104.9 FM) from Clear Channel, which in turn purchased the 98.1 FM facility licensed to Canton from Salem. Conrad and Radio Seaway partner Rich Marschner negotiated between the two chains for two years and saw the move as a means to perpetuate the classical format. The nonprofit donation was heavily modeled after a similar one made by the owners of KING-FM in 1994.

When the donation was announced, the 95.5 FM license had an estimated value of $45 million (equivalent to $84.1 million in 2025), while the 104.9 FM license—a class A signal licensed to Lorain and with a tower in Avon—was valued at $8 million (equivalent to $15 million in 2025). It was later revealed to be a $40 million deal, with the WCLV Foundation receiving $18.5 million; $3 million was used to pay off shareholder equity. Conrad later explained, "we were paid a lot to move WCLV from 95.5 to 104.9". Cleveland Foundation president Steven Minter lauded the donation as "generous and farsighted", while industry analyst J.T. Anderton said Conrad "... gets his lifetime achievement award. He deserves it. He is an FM pioneer."

Radio Seaway's original plan was to use 1420 AM as a simulcast of 104.9 FM, but purchased the intellectual property and adult standards format of WRMR (which was to be replaced on 850 AM with WKNR's sports format and call sign) prior to consummation. While generally regarded as a "frequency swap", when the asset deals closed on July 3, 2001, WCLV changed format to contemporary Christian music (CCM) as "95.5 The Fish" under the WHK-FM call sign, renamed again to WFHM-FM on August 16. WAKS concurrently changed calls to WCLV-FM, bringing over the classical format intact and retaining all on- and off-air staff. Radio Seaway ultimately donated WCLV to ideastream, one of the partners behind the WCLV Foundation, on November 1, 2011.

== Christian contemporary era (2001–present) ==
=== 95.5 The Fish ===
Final WFHM-FM logo, based on the Ichthys Christian symbol.

Salem's installation of CCM on 95.5 FM followed the implementation of similar "Fish"-themed stations in Los Angeles, Chicago and Atlanta, with the brand alluding to Ichthys, a traditional Christian symbol. The move also returned the format to Greater Cleveland for the first time since May 1999, when Clear Channel changed 104.9 FM's format from CCM (under the WZLE calls) to contemporary hit radio as WAKS. The initial airstaff for "The Fish" included former WZLE operations manager Len Howser, along with secular radio personalities Dan Deely, Daune Robinson and Rob Schuler. Sue Wilson, a veteran programmer best known for her tenure at secular adult contemporary WDOK, was named as program director; Wilson emphasized that WFHM's format would be "... positive, uplifting music, and definitely spiritual, but it's not churchy, it's not preachy".

Robinson was replaced in 2002 by former Cleveland television news anchor Robin Swoboda; Swoboda's stint lasted for three years, leaving in 2005 due to family commitments. Sue Wilson left as program director in 2006 to take the same role at country-formatted WQMX in Akron, Ohio. Deely left in 2007 and was succeeded by Howser, who co-hosted the morning show for the remainder of The Fish's existence.

=== Switch to K-Love ===
In a multi-market transaction, Salem sold WFHM-FM and six other CCM stations in their portfolio to Educational Media Foundation (EMF) on December 30, 2024, for a combined $80 million. The sale was initiated to help Salem repurchase and pay off all remaining outstanding debt. WFHM was confirmed as the new market affiliate for K-Love on January 17, 2025. The change took effect on February 1, resulting in the dismissal of the station's airstaff; 95.5 FM became WKLV-FM in a call sign swap with a K-Love station in Butler, Alabama.

The sale to EMF, d/b/a K-Love, Inc., closed on March 20, 2025.
