= Lattice tower =

Freestanding framework tower

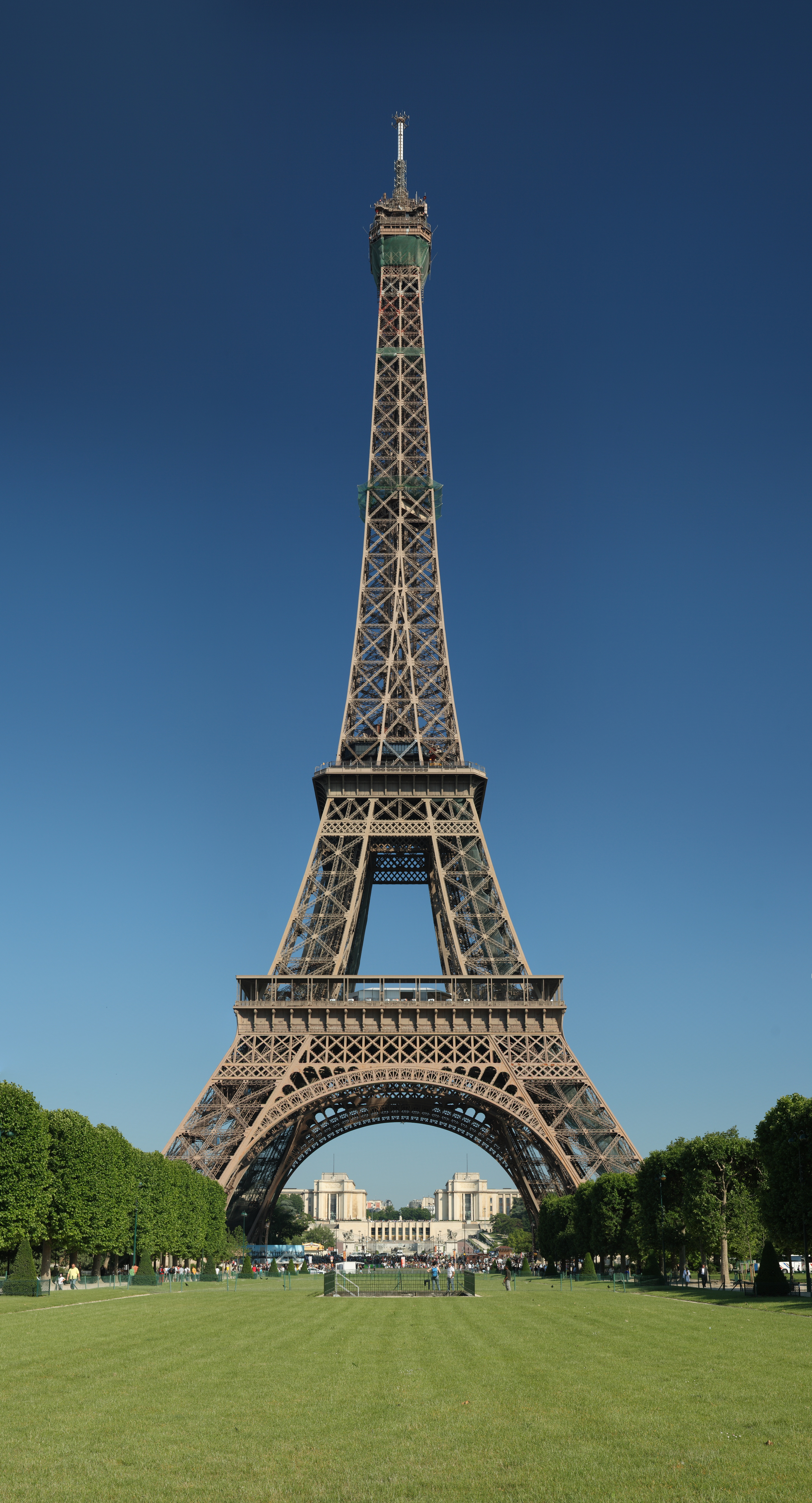
The Eiffel Tower, measuring 330 m (1,080 ft) from base to tip, is perhaps the most famous example of a lattice tower. It was built in 1889, and was the tallest man-made structure in the world until 1930.

A lattice tower, or truss tower, is a freestanding vertical framework tower. This construction is widely used in transmission towers carrying high-voltage electric power lines, in radio masts and towers (both self-radiating towers and those that support aerials) and in observation towers. Its advantage is good shear strength at a much lower weight than a tower of solid construction would have as well as lower wind resistance.

In structural engineering, the term lattice tower is used for a freestanding structure, while a lattice mast is a guyed mast supported by guy lines. Lattices of triangular (three-sided) cross-section are most common, particularly in North America. Square (four-sided) lattices are also widely used and are most common in Eurasia. A lattice tower is often designed as either a space frame or a hyperboloid structure.

Before 1940, they were used as radio transmission towers especially for short and medium wave. Occasionally lattice towers consisting of wood were utilized. The tallest wooden lattice tower was at Mühlacker, Germany. It had a height of 190 metres (620 ft) and was built in 1934 and demolished in 1945. Most wood lattice towers were demolished before 1960. In Germany, the last big radio towers consisting of wood were the transmission towers of the Golm transmitter and the transmitter Ismaning. They were demolished in 1979 and 1983 respectively.

The tallest free-standing lattice tower is the Tokyo Skytree, with a height of 634 metres (2,080 ft). The Petronius Compliant Tower is the tallest supported lattice tower at 640 metres (2,100 ft), being partially submerged. The city most renowned for lattice towers is Cincinnati, Ohio, which features four towers above 274 metres (899 ft) in height. Tokyo is the only other city in the world that has more than one above that height.

The majority of the tallest steel lattice towers in the world are actually built in water and used as oil platforms. These structures are usually built in large pieces on land, most commonly in Texas or Louisiana, and then moved by barge to their final resting place. Since a large portion of these towers is underwater, the official height of such structures is often held in dispute. The steel lattice truss for these structures, known as jackets in the oil industry, are typically far more robust and reinforced than their land-based counterparts, sometimes weighing more than 50,000 tons as is the case for the Bullwinkle and Baldpate platforms, whereas tall (above 300 m) land-based lattice towers range from a high of 10,000 tons as is the case in the Eiffel Tower to as low as a few hundred tons. They are built to a higher standard to support the weight of the oil platforms built on top of them and because of the forces to which they are subjected. As a result, the cost to build these structures can run into the hundreds of millions. These costs are justified due to the resulting oil and gas revenues, whereas land-based towers have a much lower stream of revenue and therefore the capital costs of towers are typically much less.

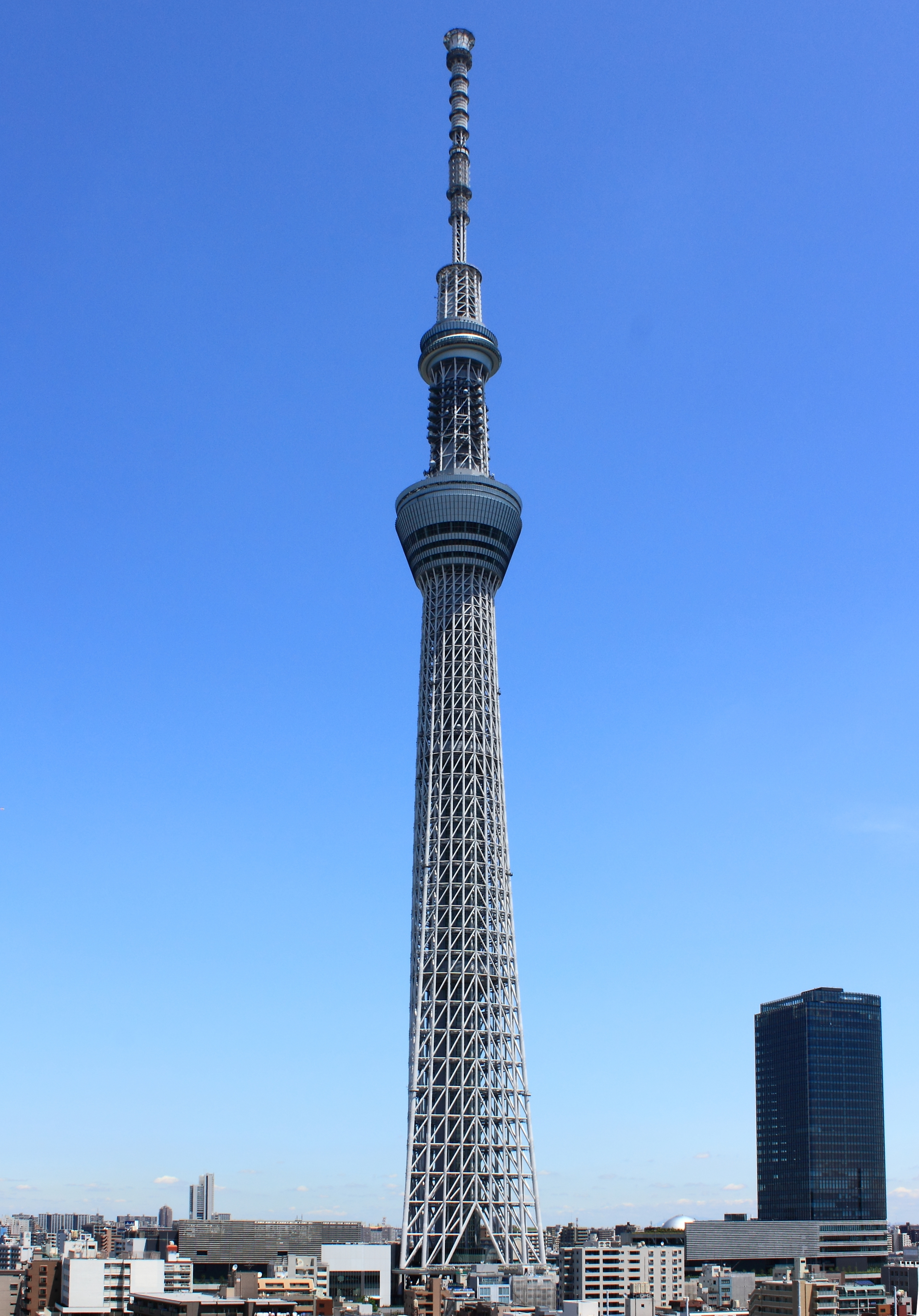
Tokyo Skytree, the tallest lattice tower in the world since its completion in 2012

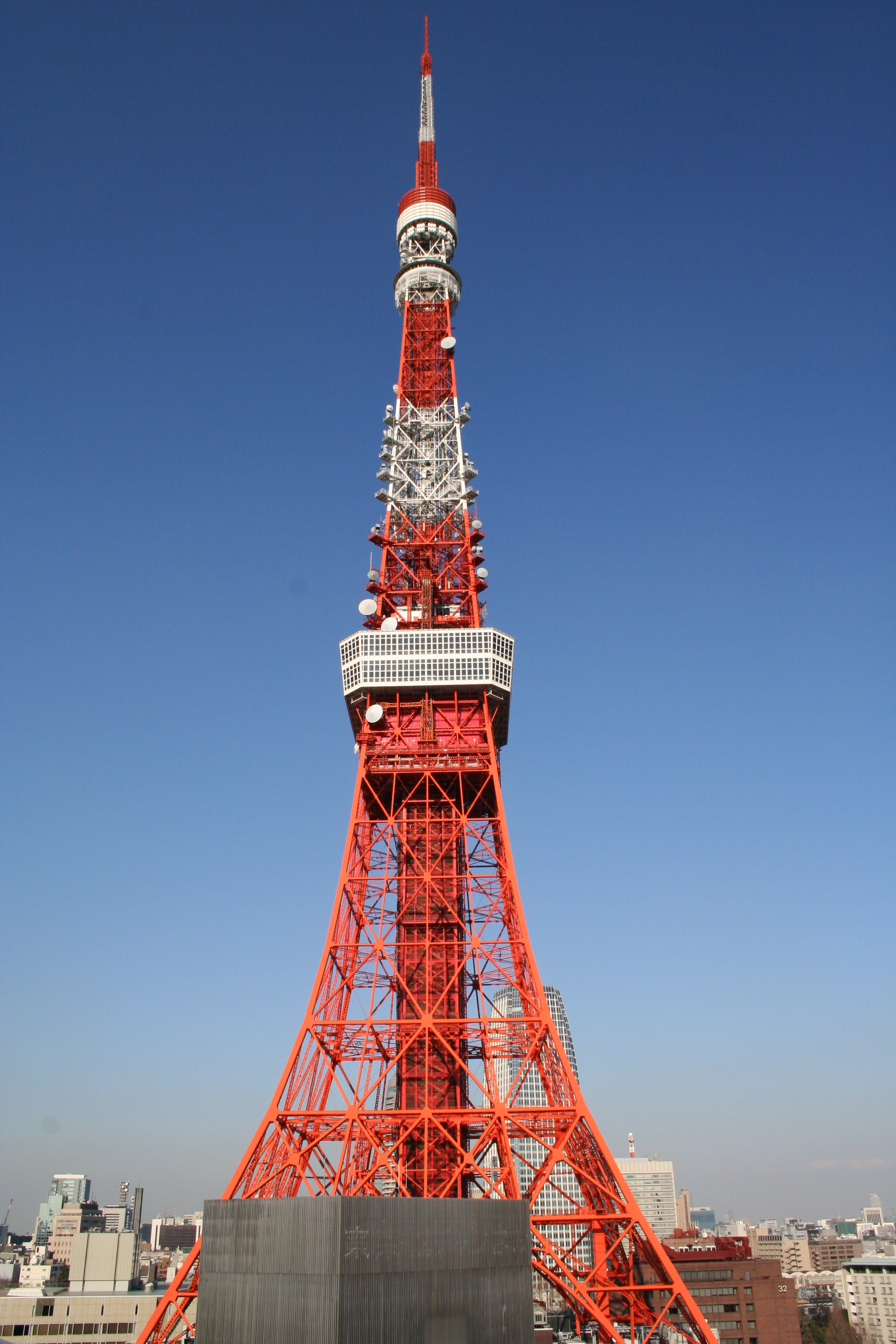
The Tokyo Tower was the tallest lattice tower in the world for 16 years, from 1957 to 1973, and remains the tallest four-sided lattice tower.

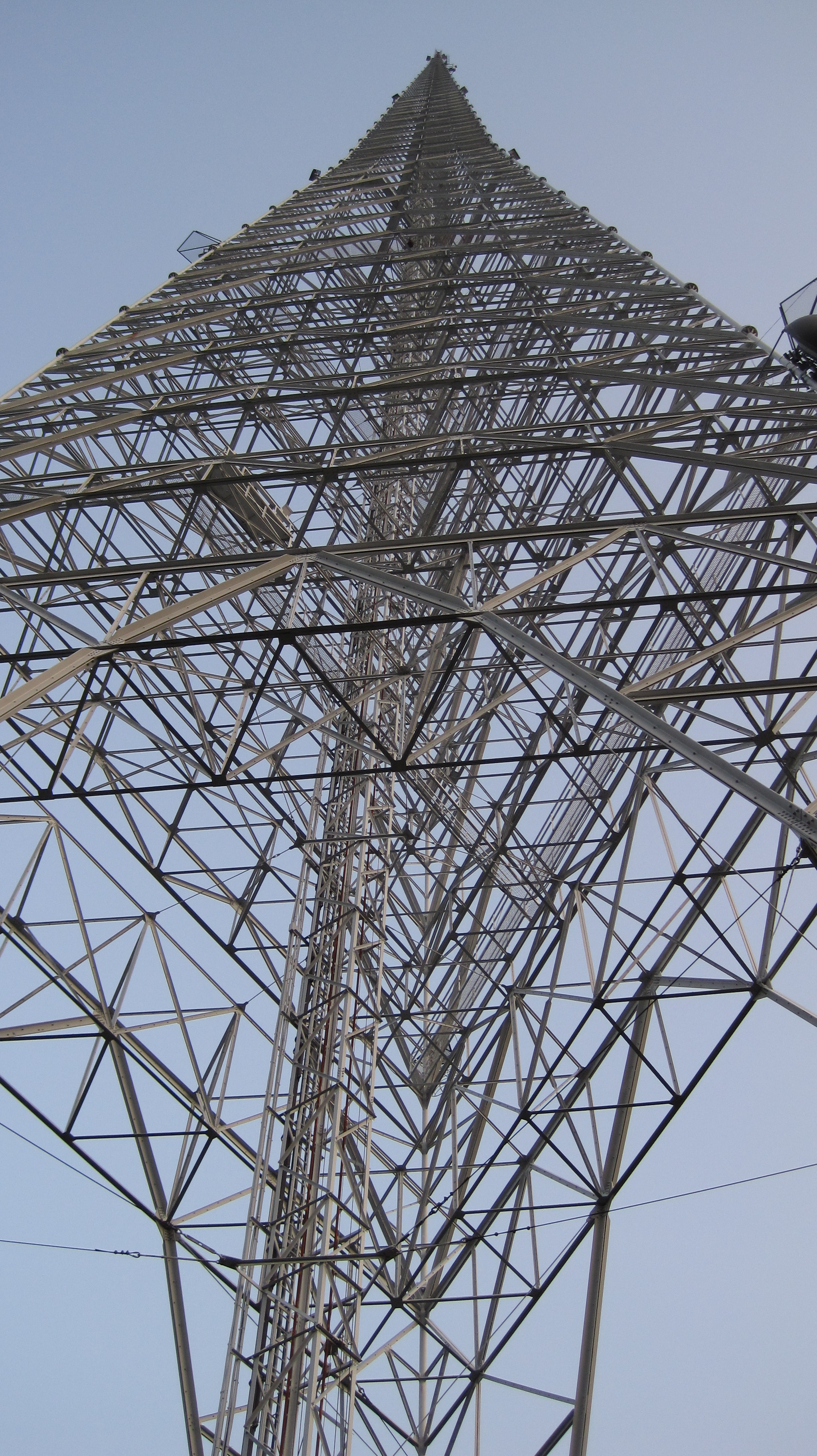
The WITI TV Tower is the tallest lattice tower in the United States and the tallest three-sided lattice tower in the world.

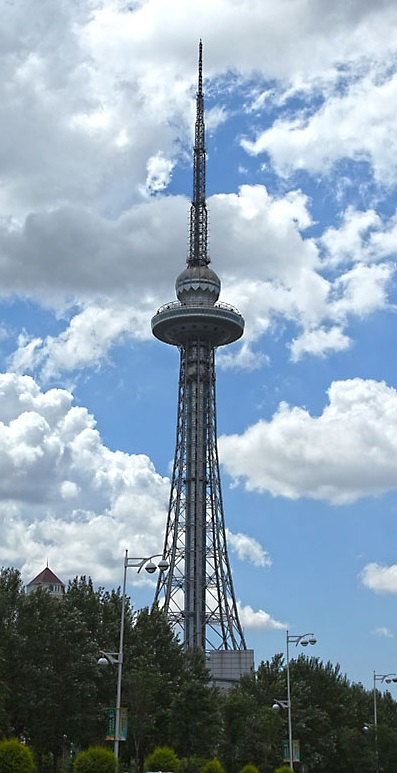
Dragon Tower, the tallest observation and radio lattice tower in China, features a solid core, the most common design for tall lattice towers built in China.

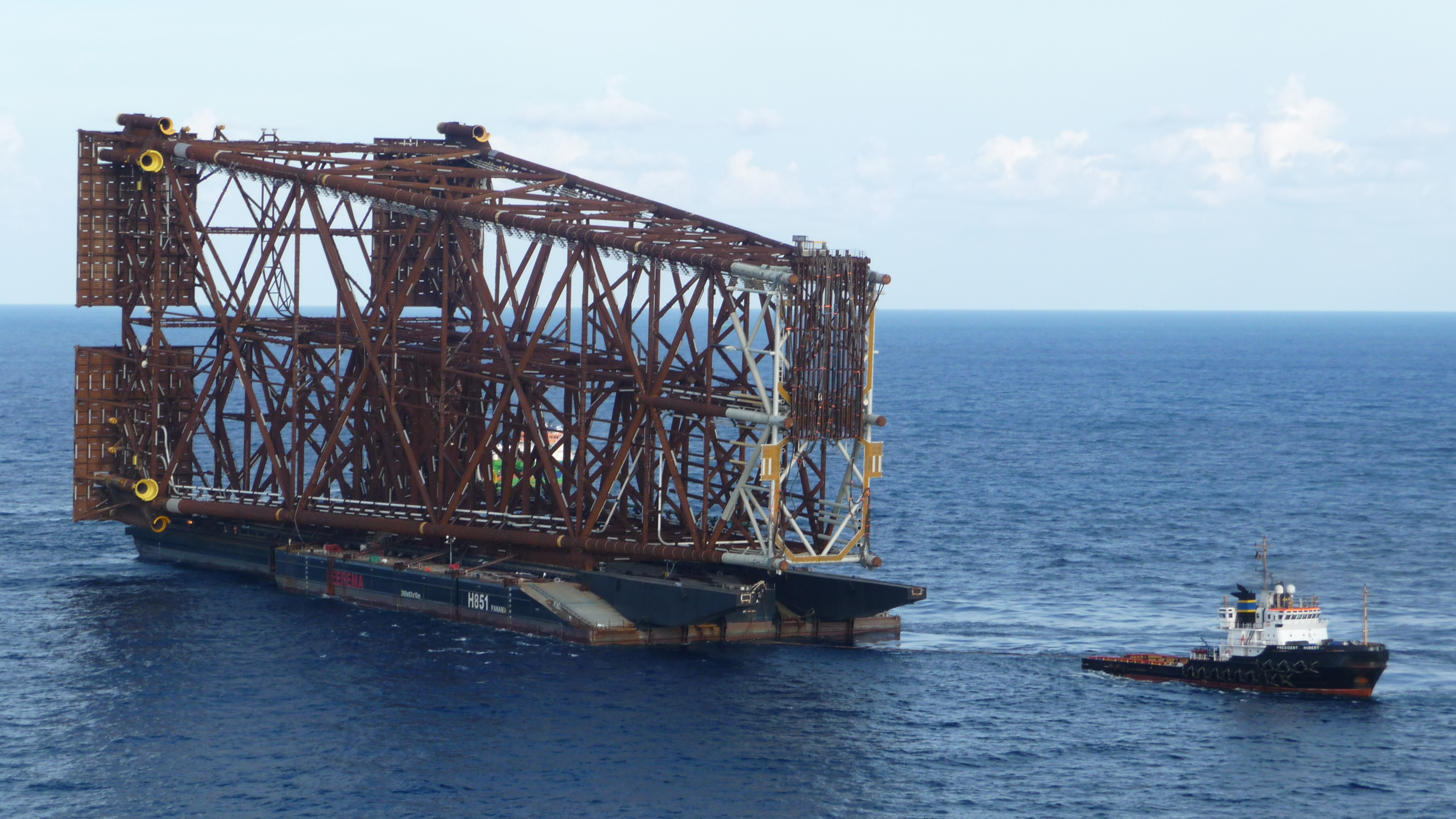
A 243 m (797 ft)-long fixed steel jacket (lattice) oil platform

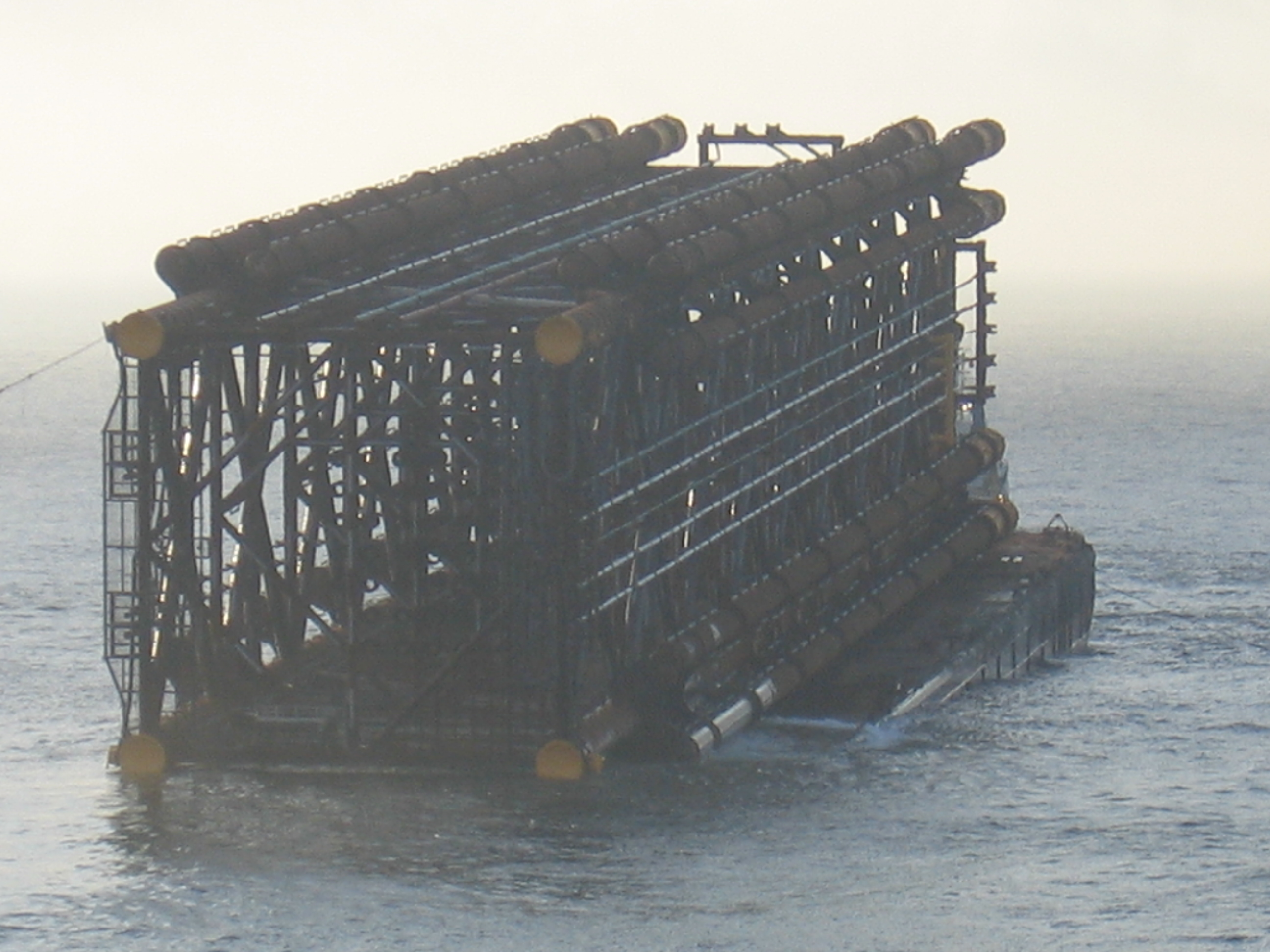
A 250 m (820 ft)-long section of the Benguela-Belize Lobito-Tomboco Platform, which accounts for only about half the overall height of the structure

== Timeline of world's tallest lattice tower ==
Since end of the 19th century, tall lattice towers were built. Lattice towers have even held the absolute height record. They are among the tallest free-standing architectural structures and hold a number of national records, such as the tallest free-standing or even overall tallest structure of a country.

=== Land record, iron and steel towers ===
Held record		Name	Location	Completed	Height (m)	Height (ft)	Notes
From	To	Name	Location	Completed	Height (m)	Height (ft)	Notes
1852	1881	Carysfort Reef Light	Key Largo, Florida, US	1852	36.6	120	
1881	1889	San Jose electric light tower	San Jose, California, US	1881	72	237	Collapsed in a storm in December 1915
1889	1956	Eiffel Tower	Paris, France	1889	312.3	1,025	When built held the absolute height record for tallest structure of any type in the world until 1930
1956	1957	KCTV Broadcast Tower	Kansas City, Missouri, US	1956	317.6	1,042	
1957	1958	Eiffel Tower	Paris, France	1889	331	1,053	The Eiffel Tower regained the record when it added an antenna.
1958	1973	Tokyo Tower	Tokyo, Japan	1957	333	1,093	
1973	2012	Kyiv TV Tower	Kyiv, Ukraine	1973	385	1,263	
2012	current	Tokyo Skytree	Tokyo, Japan	2012	634	2,080	

=== Land record, wood towers ===
Held record		Name	Location	Completed	Height (m)	Height (ft)	Notes
From	To	Name	Location	Completed	Height (m)	Height (ft)	Notes
1853	1856	Latting Observatory	New York City, United States	1853	96	315	Burned down in 1856
1899	1902	Wardenclyffe Tower	Shoreham, United States	1899	57	187	
1902	1926	Towers of South Wellfleet Marconi Wireless Station	South Wellfleet, United States	1902	64	210	4 towers
1926	1928	Stadelheim Transmitter	Munich-Stadelheim, Germany	1926	75	246	
1928	1930	Flensburg Radio Tower	Flensburg, Germany	1928	90	295	
1930	1932	Transmitter Heilsberg	Lidzbark Warmiński, Poland	1930	102	335	
1932	1933	Sendeturm Ismaning	Ismaning, Germany	1932	163	534	
1933	1934	Transmitter Berlin-Tegel	Berlin, Germany	1933	165	541	
1934	1945	Transmission Tower Mühlacker	Mühlacker, Germany	1934	190	623	Demolished on April 6, 1945
1945	1948	Transmitter Berlin-Tegel	Berlin, Germany	1933	165	541	Demolished on December 16, 1948
1948	1983	Sendeturm Ismaning	Ismaning, Germany	1932	163	534	Demolished on March 16, 1983
1983	1990	Transmitter Żórawina	Żórawina, Poland	1932	140	459	Demolished during Fall 1990
1990	current	Radio Tower Gliwice	Gliwice, Poland	1935	118	387	

=== Land and water record, overall ===
Held record		Name	Location	Completed	Height (m)	Height (ft)	Notes
From	To	Name	Location	Completed	Height (m)	Height (ft)	Notes
1852	1853	Carysfort Reef Light	Key Largo, Florida, US	1852	36.6	120	
1853	1856	Latting Observatory	New York City, United States	1853	96	315	Burned down in 1856, structure was an inspiration for the Eiffel Tower
1856	1881	Carysfort Reef Light	Key Largo, Florida, US	1852	36.6	120	
1881	1889	San Jose electric light tower	San Jose, California, US	1881	72	237	Built using an unusual design featuring circular cross-beams
1889	1956	Eiffel Tower	Paris, France	1889	312.3	1,025	Weight of iron framework 7,300 tons total weight of the tower 10,100 tons
1956	1957	KCTV Broadcast Tower	Kansas City, Missouri, US	1956	317.6	1,042	Weight; 600 tons
1889	1958	Eiffel Tower	Paris, France	1889	321	1,053	
1958	1973	Tokyo Tower	Tokyo, Japan	1957	333	1,093	Weight; 4,000 tons
1973	1977	Kyiv TV Tower	Kyiv, Ukraine	1973	385	1,263	Weight; 3,000 tons
1977	1989	Cognac Platform	Gulf of Mexico	1977	385.5	1,265	Weight; 45,000 tons or 59,000 tons
1989	1998	Bullwinkle Platform	Gulf of Mexico	1989	529	1,736	Weight of the steel jacket 49,375 tons, total weight of the platform 72,000 tons
1998	2000	Baldpate Compliant Tower	Gulf of Mexico	1998	581.5	1,908	Weight of the steel jacket 28,900 tons, total weight of the platform 38,700 tons
2000	current	Petronius Compliant Tower	Gulf of Mexico	2012	640	2,100	Weight of the steel jacket 43,000 tons, total weight of the platform 50,500 tons. When built held the absolute height record for tallest structure of any type in the world until 2010.

== Steel lattice towers ==
=== Tallest lattice towers, all types ===
List of all supertall lattice tower structures in the world.

Rank	Name	Type	Year	Built in	City/location	Height m	Height ft	Cost	Weight	Remarks
1	Petronius Compliant Tower	Oil Platform, Compliant tower	2000	United States	Gulf of Mexico	640	2,100	$500 million	50,500 tons	Tallest lattice tower of any type(supported by water buoyancy), water depth of 1,754 ft
2	Tokyo Skytree	Lattice tower	2012	Japan	Sumida, Tokyo	634	2,080	$806 million	36,000 tons	Tallest free standing lattice tower
3	Baldpate Compliant Tower	Oil Platform, Compliant tower	1998	United States	Gulf of Mexico	581.5	1,908	$300 million	38,700 tons	Tallest structure in the world 1998–2000, water depth of 1,647 ft
4	Bullwinkle Platform	Oil Platform, Steel Truss	1989	United States	Gulf of Mexico	529	1,736	$500 million	72,000 tons	Tallest fixed/rigged structure built in water, water depth of 1,352 ft
5	Benguela-Belize Lobito-Tomboco Platform	Oil Platform, Compliant tower	2008	United States	Congo Basin	512	1,680	$820 million	69,500 tons	water depth of 1,280 ft
6	Pompano Platform	Oil Platform, Steel Truss	1994	United States	Gulf of Mexico	477	1,565		39,890 tons (not including platform)	water depth of 1,290 ft
7	Tombua Landana platform	Oil Platform, Compliant tower	2009	United States	Congo Basin	474	1,554	$200 million	81,500 tons	water depth of 1,200 ft
8	Harmony Platform	Oil Platform, Steel Truss	1992	South Korea	California	366	1,200		44,100 (not including platform)	The height listed is only to water level, the tallest point of the structure is likely to be ~1,500 ft or more as seen for the Tombua Landana and other platforms above
9	Virgo Platform	Oil Platform, Steel Truss	1999	United States	Gulf of Mexico	344	1,130			height listed is only to water level, likely to be ~1,400 ft (430 m) or more in total height
10	Coelacanth Platform	Oil Platform, Steel Truss	2016	United States	Gulf of Mexico	400	1,312			water depth of 1,186 ft
11	Heritage Platform	Oil Platform, Steel Truss	1992	South Korea	California	326	1,070		35,500 (not including platform)	height listed is only to water level, likely to be ~1,300 ft (400 m) or more in total height
12	Cognac Platform	Oil Platform, Steel Truss	1977	United States	Gulf of Mexico	385.5	1,265	$100 million or $265 million	59,000 tons	water depth of 1,025 ft
13 tie	Kyiv TV Tower	Lattice tower	1973	Ukraine	Kyiv	385	1,263	$12 million		
13 tie	Yangtze River Crossing Jiangyin, North East tower	Hydro Pylon	2022	China	Jiangyin	385	1,263		13,000 tons(tower) 410 tons(wires)	tallest pylons in the world
13 tie	Yangtze River Crossing Jiangyin, South East tower	Hydro Pylon	2022	China	Jiangyin	385	1,263		13,000 tons(tower) 410 tons(wires)	tallest pylons in the world
16 tie	Jintang and Cezi islands Overhead Powerline Tie, East Tower	Hydro Pylon	2019	China	Jintang Island	380	1,247	$67 million		formerly tallest pylons in the world
16 tie	Jintang and Cezi islands Overhead Powerline Tie, West Tower	Hydro Pylon	2019	China	Jintang Island	380	1,247	$67 million		formerly tallest pylons in the world
18	Tashkent Tower	Lattice tower/Steel tower	1985	Uzbekistan	Tashkent	374.9	1,230		6,000 tons	may be categorized as a steel tower rather than a lattice tower
19 tie	Zhoushan Island Overhead Powerline Tie, North tower	Hydro Pylon	2009	China	Damao Island	370	1,214			
19 tie	Zhoushan Island Overhead Powerline Tie, South tower	Hydro Pylon	2009	China	Damao Island	370	1,214			
21	Amberjack Platform	Oil Platform, Steel Truss	1991	United States	Gulf of Mexico	314	1,030			height listed is only to water level, likely to be 1,200 ft (370 m) or more in total height
22	Schipkau Wind Turbine	Wind Turbine	2025	Germany	Schipkau, Lusatia	365	1,198	300 m tall tower, rotor diameter of 126 m, hub diameter of 4 m	+2,000 tons (tower) 400-450 tons(wind turbine)	World's tallest and first supertall wind turbine
23	Hondo Platform	Oil Platform, Steel Truss	1976	United States	Gulf of Mexico	354.5	1,163	$70 million		water depth of 850 ft
24 tie	Yangtze River Crossing Jiangyin, North West tower	Hydro Pylon	2003	China	Jiangyin	346.5	1,137		4,000 tons	
24 tie	Yangtze River Crossing Jiangyin, South West tower	Hydro Pylon	2003	China	Jiangyin	346.5	1,137		4,000 tons	
26	Dragon Tower	Lattice tower	2000	China	Harbin	336	1,102			
27	Tokyo Tower	Lattice tower	1957	Japan	Tokyo	333	1,093	$8.4 million	4,000 tons	
28	WITI TV Tower	Lattice tower	1962	United States	Shorewood, Wisconsin	329.4	1,081			
29	Cerveza Platform	Oil Platform, Steel Truss	1981	United States	Gulf of Mexico	327	1,073	$90 million		water depth of 935 ft
30	Cerveza Light Platform	Oil Platform, Steel Truss	1981	United States	Gulf of Mexico	327	1,073	$60 million		water depth of 925 ft
31	St. Petersburg TV Tower	Lattice tower	1962	Russia	Saint Petersburg	326	1,070			
32	Eiffel Tower	Lattice tower	1889	France	Paris	324	1,063	$1.5 million	10,100 tons	
33	WHDH-TV Tower	Lattice tower	1960	United States	Newton, Massachusetts	323.8	1,062			
34	KCTV Broadcast Tower	Lattice tower	1956	United States	Kansas City, Missouri	317.6	1,042	$0.42 million	600 tons	
35	Turner Broadcasting Tower	Lattice tower	1967	United States	Atlanta, Georgia	314.3	1,031			disassembled in 2010
36	Yerevan TV Tower	Lattice tower	1977	Armenia	Yerevan	311.7	1,023			tallest structure in Armenia
37	Fazilka TV Tower	Lattice tower	2007	India	Fazilka	304.8	1,000	$2.1 million	15,100 tons	tallest lattice tower in India
38	Mumbai Television Tower	Lattice tower	1972	India	Mumbai	300	984			

=== Lattice towers with observation decks ===
indicates a structure that is no longer standing.

Tower	Year	Country	Town	Height m	Height ft	Remarks
Tokyo Skytree	2012	Japan	Sumida, Tokyo	634 m	2080 ft	Tallest Lattice tower in the world
Tashkent Tower	1985	Uzbekistan	Tashkent	374.9 m	1230 ft	
Dragon Tower	2000	China	Harbin	336 m	1102 ft	
Tokyo Tower	1957	Japan	Tokyo	333 m	1093 ft	
Eiffel Tower	1889	France	Paris	330 m	1083 ft	
Zhuzhou Television Tower	1999	China	Zhuzhou	293 m	961 ft	
Shijiazhuang TV-tower	1998	China	Shijiazhuang	280 m	919 ft	
Kaifeng TV Tower	1995	China	Kaifeng	268 m	879 ft	
Daqing Radio and Television Tower	1989	China	Daqing	260 m	853 ft	
Foshan TV Tower	?	China	Foshan	238 m	781 ft	
Qingdao TV Tower	1994	China	Qingdao	232 m	761 ft	
Hongguangshan TV Tower	?	China	Ürümqi	230 m	754 ft	
Brasília TV Tower	1967	Brazil	Brasília	224 m	735 ft	formerly the tallest structure in Brazil 1967-2004
Changchun Radio and Television Tower	1997	China	Qingdao	218 m	715 ft	
Guangzhou TV Tower	1991	China	Guangzhou	217 m	712 ft	
Guangdong TV Tower	1965	China	Guangdong	200 m	656 ft	
Dalian Radio & TV Tower	1990	China	Dalian	191 m	627 ft	Has a thick solid concrete core with an exterior steel lattice, it is unknown which provides most of the structural support but the steel lattice is a very prominent feature of the tower
Nagoya TV Tower	1954	Japan	Nagoya	180 m	590 ft	
Odinstårnet	1935	Denmark	Odense	175 m	574 ft	demolished on December 14, 1944
New Brighton Tower	1900	UK	Liverpool	172.8 m	567 ft	dismantled from 1919 to 1921
Las Vegas Eiffel Tower	1999	United States	Las Vegas	165 m	541 ft	1:2 scale replica of Eiffel Tower
Osaka ABC Tower	1966	Japan	Osaka	160 m	525 ft	demolished in September 2009
The Parisian Macao	2016	China	Macau	160 m	525 ft	1:2 scale replica of Eiffel Tower
Blackpool Tower	1894	United Kingdom	Blackpool	158 m	518 ft	
Funkturm Berlin	1926	Germany	Berlin	150 m	492 ft	Only observation tower standing on insulators
Sapporo TV Tower	1957	Japan	Sapporo	147.2 m	483 ft	
Vasco-da-Gama-Tower	1998	Portugal	Lisbon	145 m	476 ft	
Alphabetic Tower	2012	Georgia	Batumi	130 m	427 ft	
Gettysburg National Tower	1974	United States	Gettysburg, Pennsylvania	120 m	394 ft	demolished on July 3, 2000 Hyperboloid structure
Observation tower of la Cité de l'Énergie	1997	Canada	Shawinigan, Quebec	115 m	377 ft	
Torre Branca	1933	Italy	Milan	108.6 m	356 ft	
Kobe Port Tower	1963	Japan	Kobe	108 m	354 ft	
Eiffel Tower of Window of the World	1993	China	Shenzhen	108 m	354 ft	1:3 scale replica of Eiffel Tower
Eiffel Tower of Tiandu City Community	2007	China	Macau	108 m	354 ft	1:3 scale replica of Eiffel Tower
Marine Tower Yokohama	1961	Japan	Yokohama	106 m	348 ft	
Tsutenkaku	1956	Japan	Osaka	103 m	338 ft	
Hakata Port Tower	1964	Japan	Fukuoka	103 m	338 ft	
Tour métallique de Fourvière	1894	France	Lyon	101 m	331 ft	Not used as observation tower since 1953
Total Tower	1994	United States	Denver	100.6 m	330 ft	
Beppu Tower	1957	Japan	Beppu	100 m	328 ft	
Eiffel Tower of Kings Island	1972	United States	Mason, Ohio	96 m	315 ft	1:3.5 scale replica of Eiffel Tower
Eiffel Tower of Kings Dominion	1975	United States	Doswell, Virginia	96 m	315 ft	1:3.5 scale replica of Eiffel Tower
Cholfirst Radio Tower	1973	Switzerland	Flurlingen	96 m	315 ft	
Sunsphere	1982	United States	Knoxville	81.07 m	266 ft	
Eiffel Tower replica in Bahria Town	2014	Pakistan	Bahria	80 m	262 ft	1:4 scale replica of Eiffel Tower
Torre Sant Sebastia	1931	Spain	Barcelona	78 m	256 ft	Harbour terminal aerial tramway
Hiratsuka TV Tower	1972	Japan	Hiratsuka	70 m	256 ft	
Facility 4101, Tower 93	1975	Germany	Hürth	74.84 m	246 ft	Electricity pylon, which carried from 1977 to 2010 in a height of 27 metres (89 ft) an observation deck
Morecambe Tower	1898	UK	Morecambe	71 m	232 ft	dismantled during the first world war, built on top of a theatre
Hot Springs Mountain Tower	1983	United States	Hot Springs Mountain	65.8 m	216 ft	
Petřínská rozhledna	1891	Czech	Prague	60 m	197 ft	
Bachtel Tower	1986	Switzerland	Hinwil	60 m	197 ft	
Green Tower	1998	Japan	Sanbu	60 m	197 ft	
Gross Reken Melchenberg Radio Tower	2002	Germany	Reken	60 m	197 ft	
Schomberg Observation Tower	2006	Germany	Sundern	60 m	197 ft	
Aalborgtårnet	1933	Denmark	Aalborg	54.9 m	180 ft	dismantled and rebuilt from the ground up in 2005
Observation Tower Ahlbeck	1998	Germany	Ahlbeck	50 m	164 ft	
Watkins' Tower	1891	UK	London	47 m	154 ft	never completed & dismantled in 1907 was to be 358 m / 1175 ft in height
Morsbach Observation Tower	1962	Germany	Morsbach	45 m	148 ft	
Joseph's Cross	1896	Germany	Stolberg	38 m	124 ft	
Poppenberg Observation Tower	1897	Germany	Ilfeld	33 m	108 ft	
Lemberg Tower	1899	Germany	Lemberg Mountain	33 m	108 ft	
Wanne Observation Tower	1888	Germany	Villingen-Schwenningen	30 m	98 ft	
Gehrenberg Tower	1903	Germany	Markdorf	30 m	98 ft	
Tower of Unity	1962	Germany	Heldrastein	30 m	98 ft	Former additionally guyed lattice tower, which was transformed into observation tower
Gustav-Vietor-Tower	1882	Germany	Hohe Wurzel (Taunus)	25 m	82 ft	demolished in 2006
Observation Tower at Goetzinger's Height	1883	Germany	Neustadt/Saxony	25 m	82 ft	
Hochfirst Tower	1890	Germany	Titisee-Neustadt	25 m	82 ft	Additionally guyed
Büchenbronn Observation Tower	1883	Germany	Büchenbronn	24.75 m	81 ft	Additionally guyed
Tour du Belvédère	1898	France	Mulhouse-Belvédère	20 m	65 ft	
Salzgitter Bismarck Tower	1900	Germany	Salzgitter	17 m	56 ft	
Gillerberg Observation Tower	1892	Germany	Hilchenbach	15 m	49 ft	

=== Radio towers carrying aerials ===
List of radio tower above 150 metres (490 ft) in height.

indicates a structure that is no longer standing.
indicates a structure that has had a change in height or has been rebuilt.

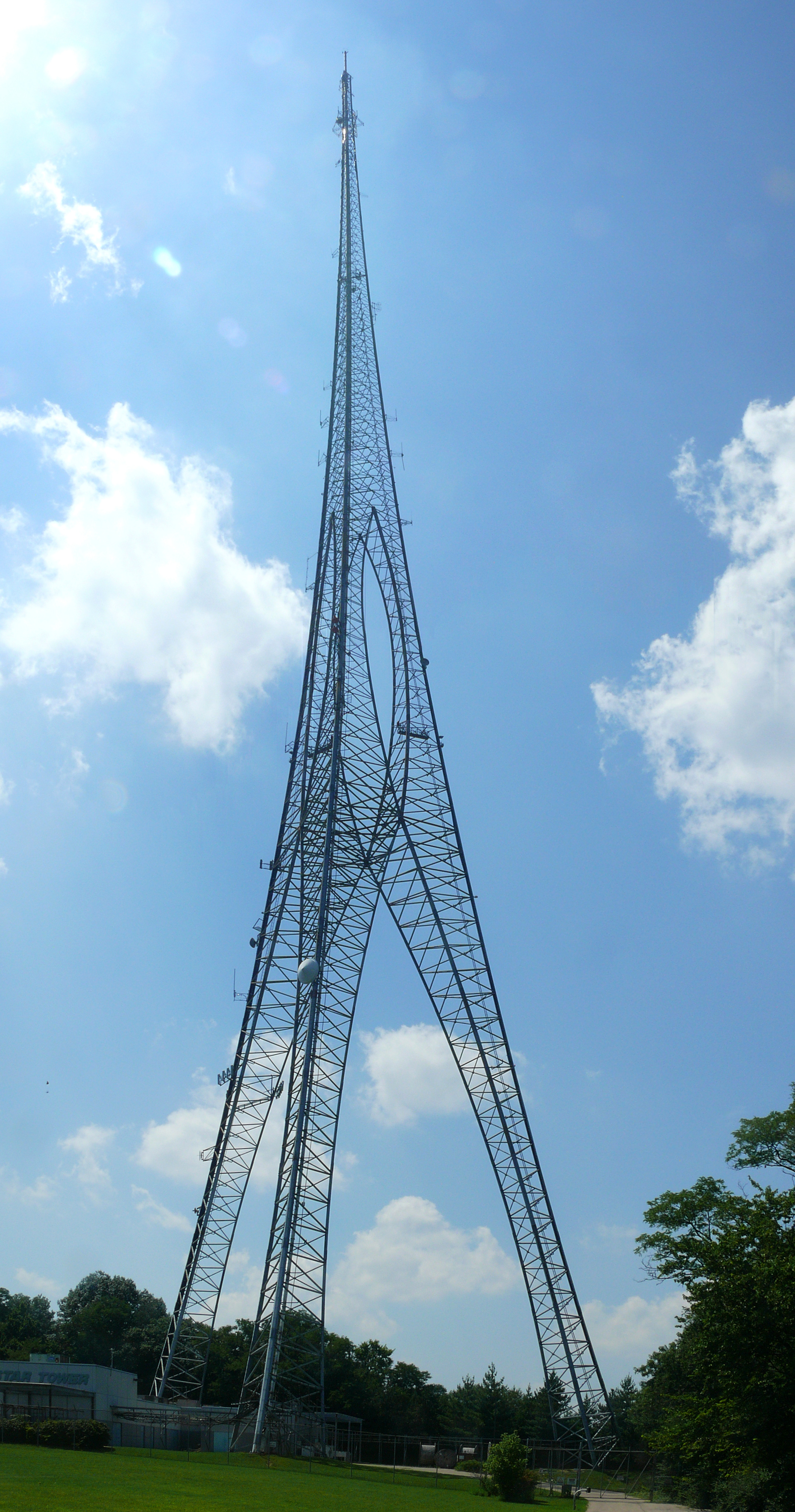
Star Tower, example of a Landmark tower

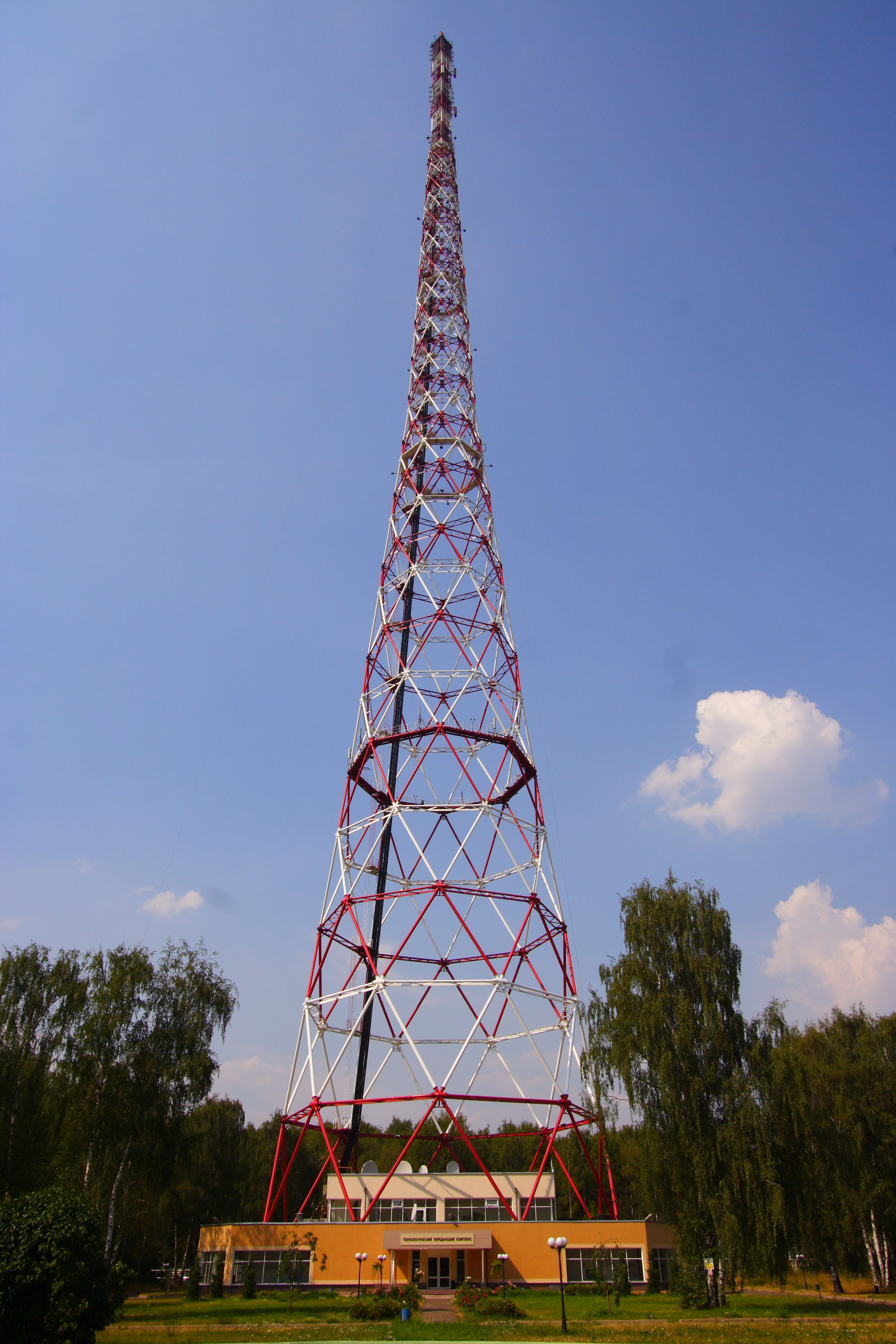
Moscow Octod Tower, example of a hyperboloid lattice tower

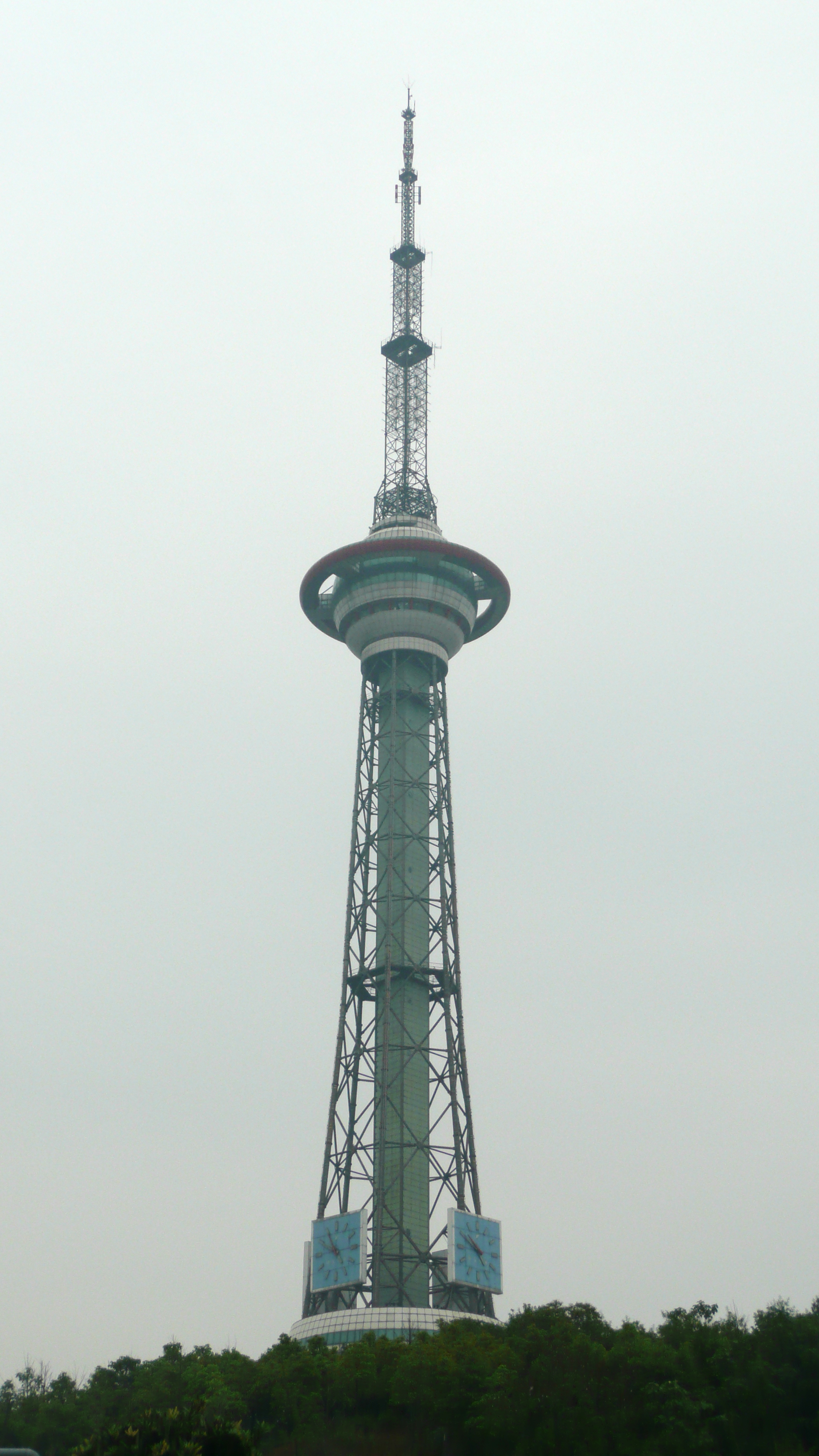
Zhuzhou Television Tower, example of a lattice tower with a solid core, nearly a dozen of which were built in China throughout the 90s

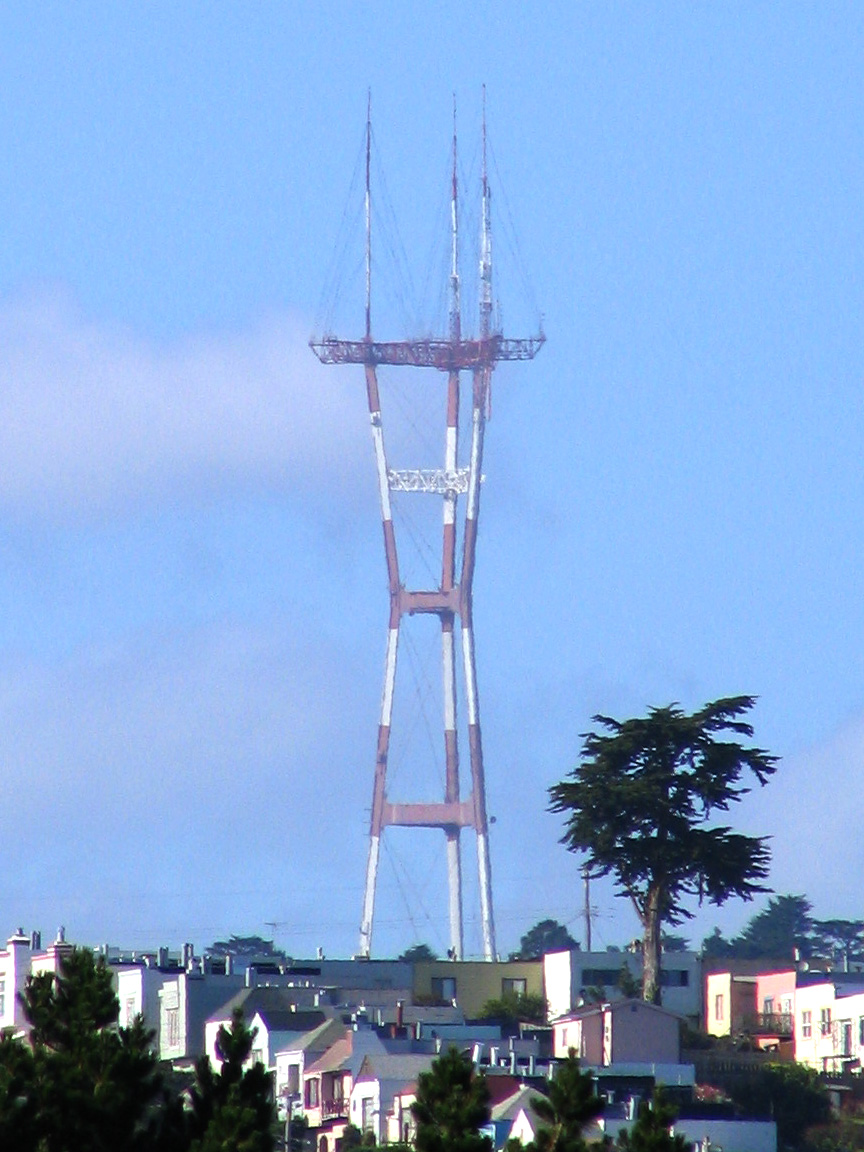
Sutro Tower, a well-known San Francisco landmark featuring an uncommon three-legged design

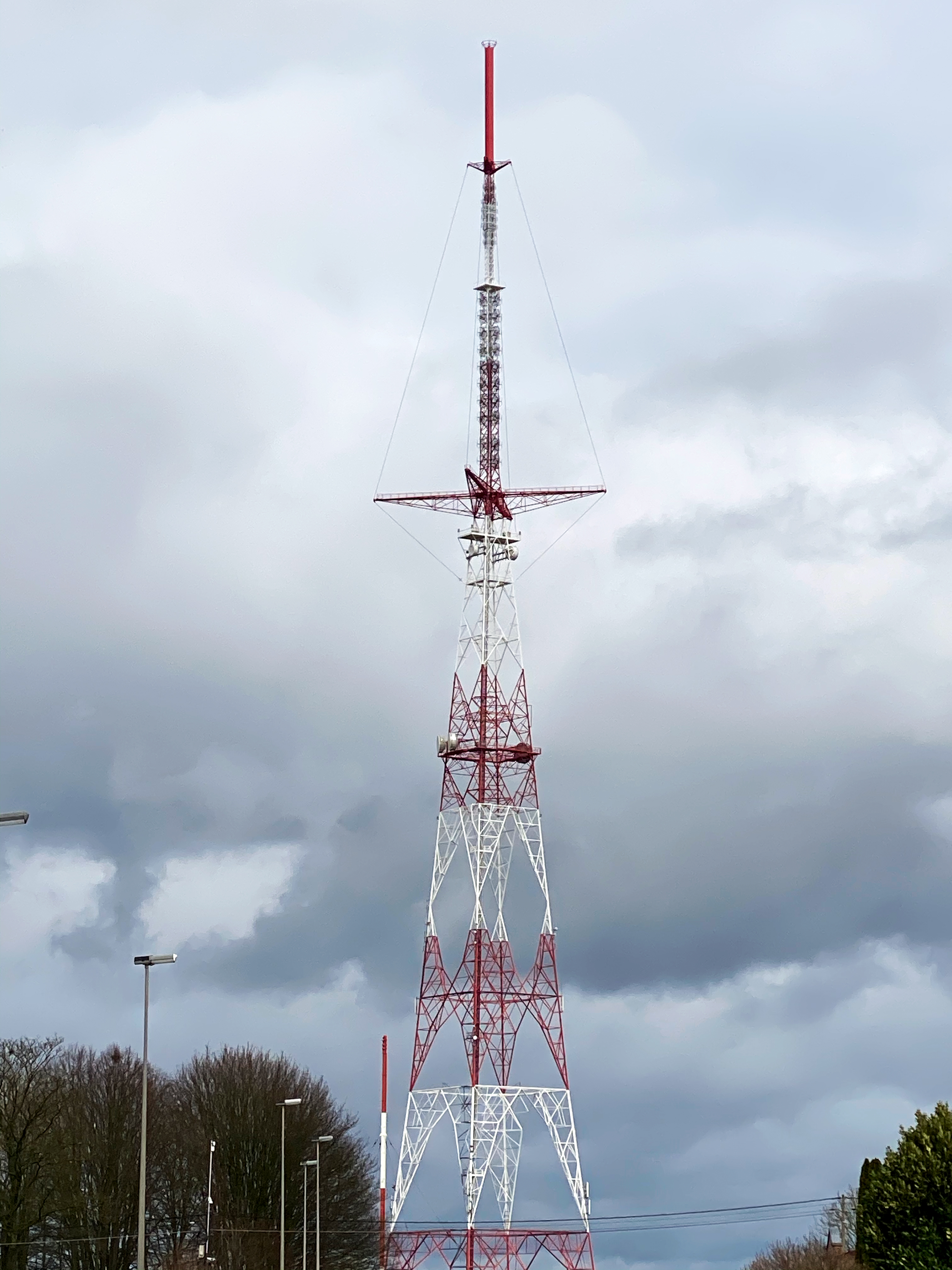
The Wavre Transmitter features an unusual design that uses a guyed upper section to hold the transmitter in place.

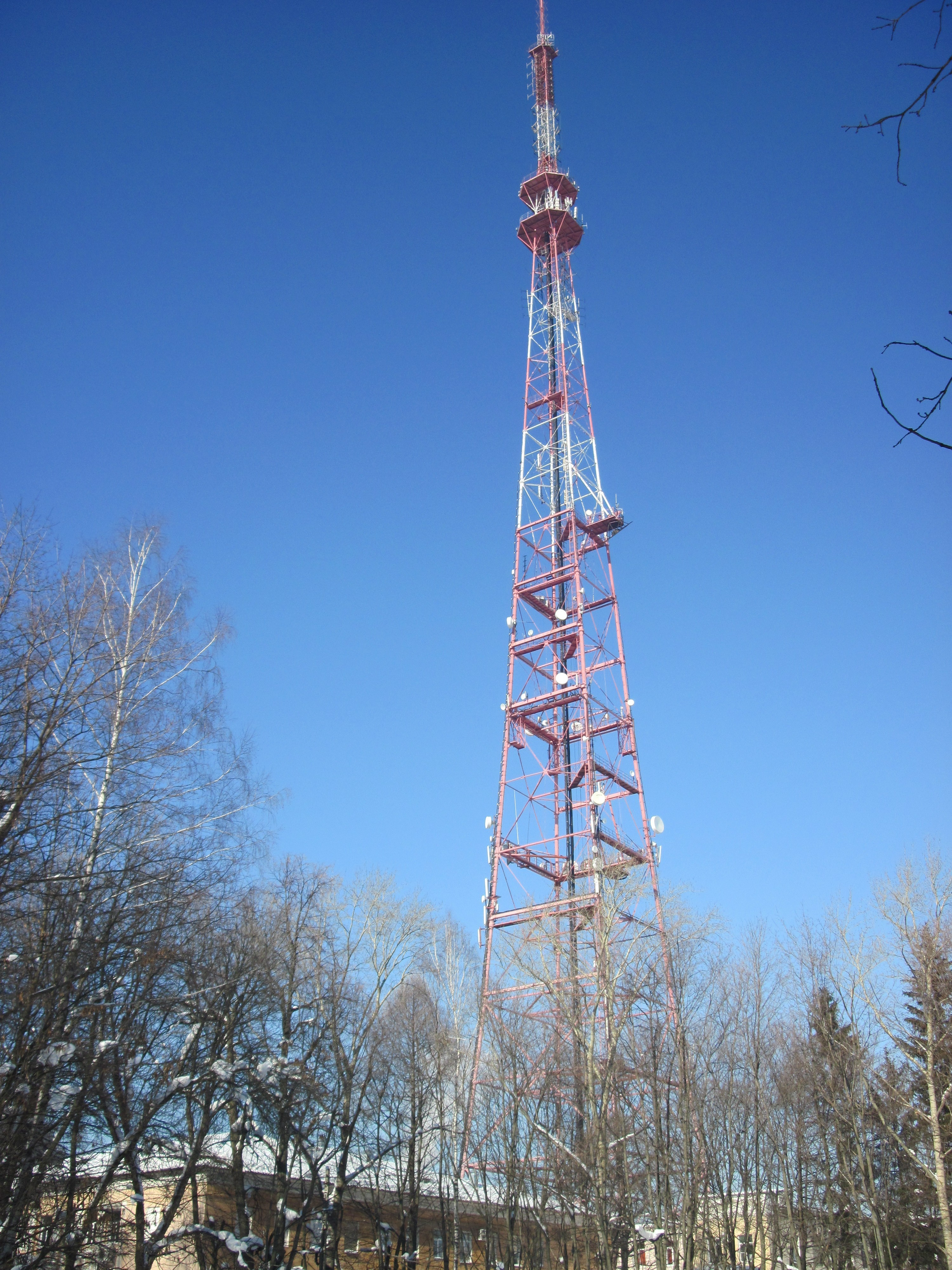
Example of a 3803 KM tower, a very common four-sided lattice tower design developed in the Soviet Union. About 80 of these were built in nearly every large city from 1956 to 1967.

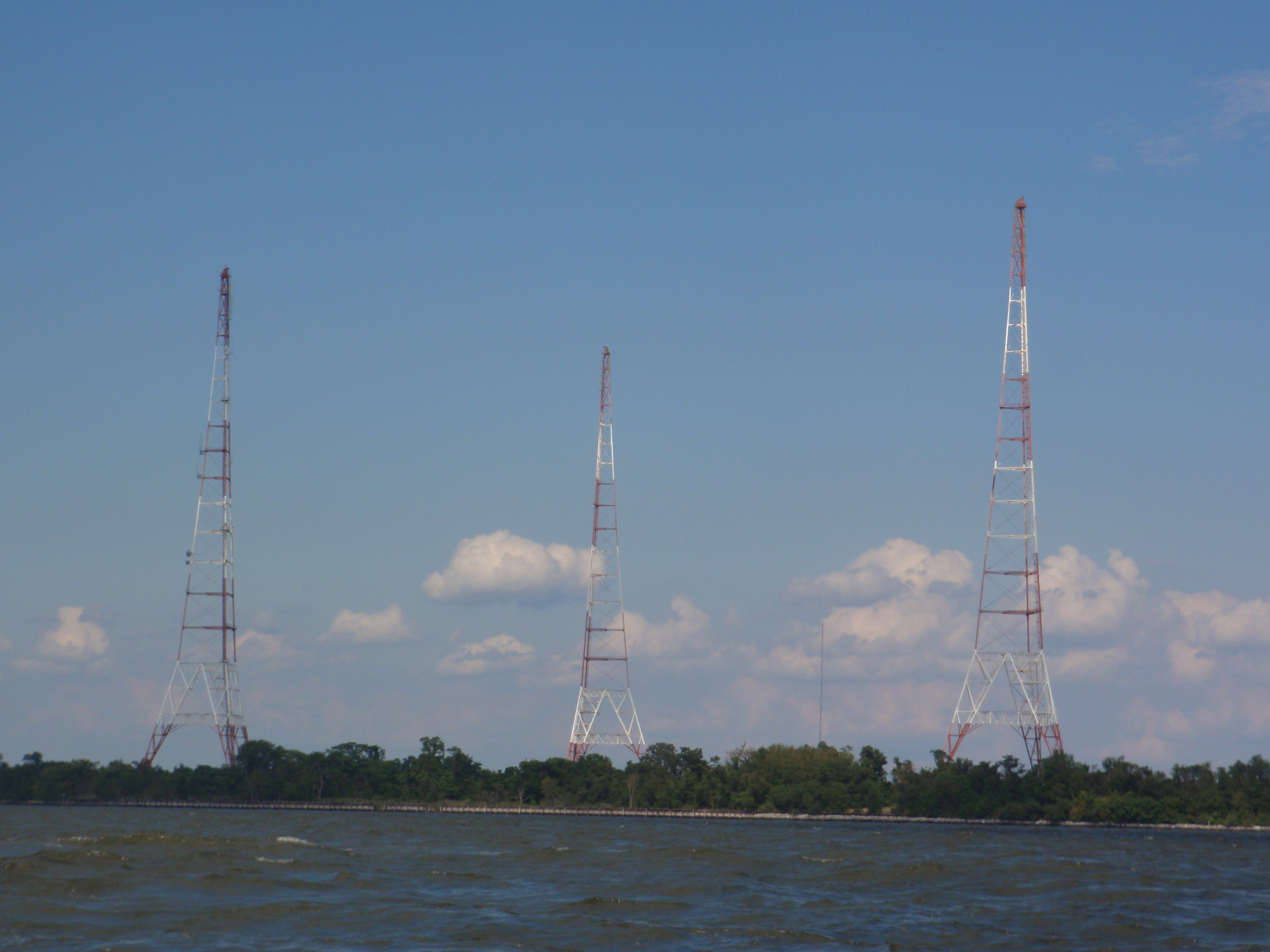
Example of an Annapolis type military-use lattice tower. The US Navy built over 40 of these from 1914 to 1922 and from 1936 to 1938.

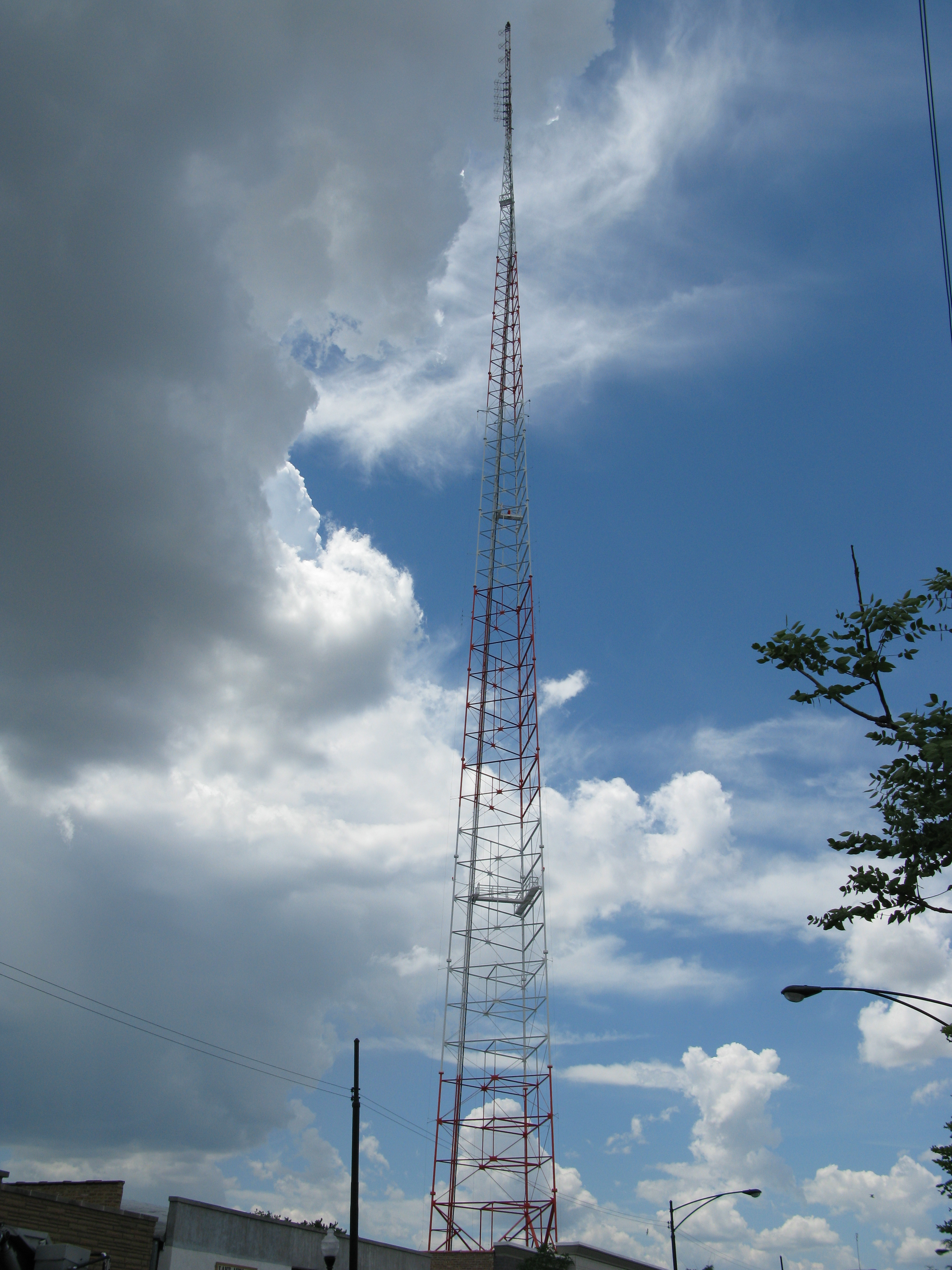
Example of a typical commercial-use three-sided lattice tower, thousands of which have been built throughout North America, over 100 of which are on the list. Many different truss patterns are used but the general design is largely similar.

Tower	Year	Country	Town	Height m	Height ft	Design type	Notable for
Tokyo Skytree	2012	Japan	Tokyo	634 m	2080 ft	solid reinforced concrete core supported by cylindrical lattice frame	the tallest tower of any type in the world and the tallest land-based lattice tower, tallest structure in Japan
Kyiv TV Tower	1973	Ukraine	Kyiv	385 m	1263 ft	solid steel core supported by a 6-sided lattice frame with 4 legs	tallest land based lattice tower from 1973 to 2012, tallest structure in Ukraine
Tashkent Tower	1985	Uzbekistan	Tashkent	374.9 m	1230 ft	solid steel core supported by cylindrical lattice frame with 3 steel legs	more likely to be categorized as a steel tower than a lattice tower, tallest structure in Uzbekistan
Dragon Tower	2000	China	Harbin	336 m	1102 ft	solid core supported by 6-sided lattice frame, 4-sided upper portion	
Tokyo Tower	1957	Japan	Tokyo	333 m	1093 ft	4-sided, 4 legged	tallest lattice tower in the world from 1957 to 1973
Eiffel Tower	1889	France	Paris	330 m	1083 ft	4-sided, 4 legged	tallest lattice tower in the world from 1889 to 1956, has undergone multiple height changes, original height of 1,024 ft (312 m) to tip of flagpole
WITI TV Tower	1962	United States	Shorewood, Wisconsin	329.4 m	1081 ft	3-sided	tallest land based lattice tower in the United States, second tallest in the world when completed in 1962
St. Petersburg TV Tower	1962	Russia	Saint Petersburg	326 m	1070 ft	solid(steel) central core supported by 6-sided lattice frame	tallest lattice tower in Russia, height increase of 53 ft (16 m) in 2011
WHDH-TV Tower	1960	United States	Newton, Massachusetts	323.8 m	1062 ft	3-sided	
KCTV Broadcast Tower	1956	United States	Kansas City, Missouri	317.6 m	1042 ft	4-sided, pyramid type	briefly became the tallest lattice tower in the world when completed in 1956 surpassing the Eiffel Tower's original height by 17 feet weight; 600 tons
Turner Broadcasting Tower	1967	United States	Atlanta, Georgia	314.3 m	1031 ft	3-sided	dismantled in 2010
Yerevan TV Tower	1977	Armenia	Yerevan	311.7 m	1023 ft	solid steel core supported by 3-sided lattice frame	tallest structure in Armenia
Fazilka TV Tower	2007	India	Fazilka	304.8 m	1000 ft	4-sided	tallest lattice tower in India
Mumbai Television Tower	1972	India	Mumbai	300 m	984 ft	4-sided	
Sutro Tower	1973	United States	San Francisco, California	297.8 m	977 ft	3 legged guyed upper section and candelabra top	
WKRQ Tower	1960's	United States	Cincinnati, Ohio	294.6 m	967 ft	3-sided	
Zhuzhou Television Tower	1999	China	Zhuzhou	293 m	961 ft	solid core supported by 6-sided lattice frame	
Star Tower	1991	United States	Cincinnati, Ohio	290.8 m	954 ft	Landmark tower design	Last lattice tower above 700 feet built in the United States
WLWT TV Tower	1978	United States	Cincinnati, Ohio	289.6 m	950 ft	3-sided	
Dudelange Radio Tower	1957	Luxembourg	Dudelange	285 m	935 ft	3-sided	tallest free-standing structure in Luxembourg, rebuilt in 1981 following an aircraft collision
AIR Tower	2013	India	Amritsar	282 m	925 ft	4-sided	The AIR tower was originally intended to be 1000 feet tall. According to some sources it reached this height but others claim it only reached a peak of 280 m (920 ft) or so before plans were made to reduce its height to 100 m (330 ft) due to a tilt being noticed in the towers angle at the top.. More recent documentation has indicated that the towers height is specifically 282m.. But photos seem to show a more significant portion of the upper section of the tower as having been removed after its initial construction such that its current height is somewhere in the range of 230 to 250 meters tall.
Shijiazhuang TV-tower	1998	China	Shijiazhuang	280 m	919 ft	solid core supported by 8-sided lattice frame with 4 legs	
Net 25 Tower	1990	Philippines	Quezon City	276.4 m	907 ft	3-sided	tallest structure in the Philippines
WCPO TV Tower	1965	United States	Cincinnati, Ohio	276 m	905 ft	3-sided	
Perm TV tower	2016	Russia	Perm	275 m	902 ft	Hyperboloid structure	weight; 657 tons
Tbilisi TV Broadcasting Tower	1972	Georgia	Tbilisi	274.5 m	901 ft	solid steel core supported by 3-sided lattice frame with 2 legs	more likely to be categorized as a steel tower than a lattice tower, tallest structure in Georgia
RCTI TV Tower	?	Indonesia	Jakarta	274 m	900 ft	3-sided	tallest lattice tower in Indonesia
Kaifeng TV Tower	1989	China	Kaifeng	268 m	879 ft	solid core supported by 8-sided lattice frame with 4 legs	
Daqing Radio and Television Tower	1989	China	Daqing	260 m	853 ft	solid core supported by 6-sided lattice frame, 4-sided upper portion	
Moscow Octod Tower	2006	Russia	Moscow	258 m	846 ft	Hyperboloid structure	Structure has been partially disassembled
WTVR TV Tower	1953	United States	Richmond, Virginia	257 m	843 ft	4-sided, pyramid type	second tallest lattice tower in the world when completed in 1953
Volgograd regional radio and television transmitting center	2016	Russia	Volgograd	256 m	840 ft	4-sided	
WBNS TV Tower	1955	United States	Columbus, Ohio	255.8 m	839 ft	3-sided	
Grodno TV Tower	1984	Belarus	Grodno	254 m	833 ft	4-sided, Top guyed lattice tower, featuring a guyed upper section with four horizontal crossbars	tallest freestanding structure in Belarus
Lafayette transmitter, Tower 1	1918	France	Marcheprime	250 m	820 ft	3-sided, Annapolis type military use	six of the eight towers were built by 1918, the last two were completed in 1920. The retreating German army demolished all but one of the towers in 1944
Lafayette transmitter, Tower 2	1918	France	Marcheprime	250 m	820 ft	3-sided, Annapolis type military use	demolished in 1944
Lafayette transmitter, Tower 3	1918	France	Marcheprime	250 m	820 ft	3-sided, Annapolis type military use	demolished in 1944
Lafayette transmitter, Tower 4	1918	France	Marcheprime	250 m	820 ft	3-sided, Annapolis type military use	demolished in 1944
Lafayette transmitter, Tower 5	1918	France	Marcheprime	250 m	820 ft	3-sided, Annapolis type military use	demolished in 1944
Lafayette transmitter, Tower 6	1920	France	Marcheprime	250 m	820 ft	3-sided, Annapolis type military use	demolished in 1944
Lafayette transmitter, Tower 7	1920	France	Marcheprime	250 m	820 ft	3-sided, Annapolis type military use	demolished in 1944
Lafayette transmitter, Tower 8	1920	France	Marcheprime	250 m	820 ft	3-sided, Annapolis type military use	the final tower was dismantled in 1953
Longwave transmitter Junglinster, Tower 1	1932	Luxembourg	Junglinster	250 m	820 ft	3-sided, insulated against ground	The 2nd & 3rd towers were built at a later date, all three towers were reduced in height in 1983 to 216 m (709 ft)
Longwave transmitter Junglinster, Tower 2	1954	Luxembourg	Junglinster	250 m	820 ft	3-sided, insulated against ground	height since 1983; 216 m (709 ft)
Longwave transmitter Junglinster, Tower 3	1959	Luxembourg	Junglinster	250 m	820 ft	3-sided, insulated against ground	height since 1983; 216 m (709 ft)
Novodnistrovsk TV Tower	1987	Ukraine	Dunaivtsi	250 m	820 ft	4-sided	
Hanoi TV Tower	2013	Vietnam	Hanoi	250 m	820 ft	4-sided, 4 legged	tallest lattice tower in Vietnam
River Road Tower	1965	United States	Washington, DC	246.6 m	809 ft	3-sided candelabra top	
Seto Digital Tower	2011	Japan	Seto	244.7 m	803 ft	central lattice mast supported by 6 exterior legs	
Vitebsk TV Tower	1983	Belarus	Vitebsk	244 m	801 ft	4-sided, Top guyed lattice tower, featuring a guyed upper section with four horizontal crossbars	
Astara TV Tower	1981	Republic of Azerbaijan	Astara	243.84 m	800 ft	4-sided, Top guyed lattice tower, featuring a guyed upper section with four horizontal crossbars	
Central tower (Königs Wusterhausen)	1925	Germany	Koenigs Wusterhausen	243 m	797 ft	3-sided	collapsed during storm on November 15, 1972
Yakutsk TV Tower	1982	Russia	Yakutsk	241.71 m	793 ft	4-sided	antenna; 241.7 metres 793 ft, roof; 225.7 m 740 ft
Birobidzhan TV Tower	1972	Russia	Birobidzhan	241 m	791 ft	4-sided	
Kharkiv TV Tower	1981	Ukraine	Kharkiv	240.7 m	790 ft	solid steel core supported by 6-sided lattice frame with 3 legs	Partially destroyed by a Russian airstrike on April 22, 2024. The top half of the tower collapsed, but the lower half supported by the lattice structure remains standing.
Foshan TV Tower	?	China	Foshan	238 m	781 ft	solid core supported by 8-sided lattice frame with 4 legs, 4-sided upper portion	
Tower of Power	1988	Philippines	Quezon City	236.8 m	777 ft	4-sided	
Channel 9 TV Tower	1965	Australia	Sydney	233 m	764 ft	4-sided	dismantled in August 2021
Wavre Transmitter	1983	Belgium	Wavre	232 m	761 ft	4-sided, Top guyed lattice tower, featuring a guyed upper section with four horizontal crossbars	tallest lattice tower in Belgium
Hughes Memorial Tower	1989	United States	Washington, DC	232 m	761 ft	Landmark tower design	
Qingdao TV Tower	1994	China	Qingdao	232 m	761 ft	solid central core supported by 6-sided lattice frame, 4-sided upper portion	
WOR TV Tower	1949	United States	North Bergen, New Jersey	231.65 m	760 ft	4-sided	dismantled after being struck by an aircraft in 1956
Hongguangshan TV Tower	?	China	Ürümqi	230 m	754 ft	solid central core supported by 6-sided lattice frame, 4-sided upper portion	
Belgorod TV Tower	2013	Russia	Belgorod	230 m	754 ft	4-sided	
KQTV Tower	1953	United States	St. Joseph, Missouri	229 m	750 ft	4-sided, pyramid type	height since 2009; 587 ft (179 m)
WIVB TV Tower	1948	United States	Buffalo, New York	226.2 m	742 ft	3-sided	
TV5 Tower	?	Bangkok	Thailand	225 m	740 ft	3-sided	tallest lattice tower in Thailand
WTRF-TV Tower	1962	United States	Bridgeport, Ohio	225 m	738 ft	3-sided	
Brasília TV Tower	1967	Brazil	Brasília	224 m	735 ft	6-sided	
Millennium Transmitter	1969	Philippines	Quezon City	219.5 m	720 ft	4-sided	
Sahiwal TV Tower	1970's	Pakistan	Sahiwal	219.5 m	720 ft	4-sided	tallest structure in Pakistan
Crystal Palace Transmitter	1950	UK	London	219 m	719 ft	4-sided	tallest lattice tower in England
Changchun Radio and Television Tower	1997	China	Qingdao	218 m	715 ft	solid core supported by 6-sided lattice frame, 4-sided upper portion	
Mediacorp TV tower	2006	Singapore	Bukit Batok	217 m	712 ft	4-sided, (1°21'5.29"N 103°45'59.11"E)	built on a hill, height from lowest leg is 746 ft (227 m)
Guangzhou TV Tower	1991	China	Guangzhou	217 m	712 ft	4-sided, 4 legged	
Blosenbergturm	1937	Switzerland	Beromünster	216 m	709 ft	4-sided	selfradiating tower insulated against ground
Melitopol Retransmitter Tower	1981	Ukraine	Melitopol	216 m	709 ft	4-sided	
Deyang TV Tower	1991	China	Deyang	216 m	709 ft	12-sided, 4 legged	
Channel 7/10 TV Tower	1965	Australia	Sydney	216 m	708 ft	4-sided	tallest lattice tower in Australia
WBIR TV Tower	1956	United States	Knoxville, Tennessee	215.5 m	707 ft	3-sided	dismantled in August 2023
WTTG TV Tower	1963	United States	Washington, DC	214.8	705 ft	3-sided	
Mariupol TV Tower	1981	Ukraine	Mariupol	214 m	702 ft	4-sided	
Zlatoust TV Tower	1983	Russia	Zlatoust	213 m	699 ft	4-sided	
Torre TV Bandeirantes	1997	Brazil	São Paulo	212 m	696 ft	4-sided non-tapering, weight; 650 tons	
WJLA TV Tower	1972	United States	Washington, DC	210.9	692 ft	3-sided	
TV Tower Bol d'Air-Ougrée	?	Belgium	Bol d'Air-Ougrée	210 m	689 ft	4-sided	
Cherepovets TV Tower	1969	Russia	Cherepovets	208.5 m	684 ft	4-sided	
KTWB-TV Tower	1979	United States	Seattle, Washington	208 m	682 ft	3-sided	
Khmelnytsky TV Tower	1980	Ukraine	Khmelnytskyi	208 m	682 ft	4-sided	
Arkhangelsk TV Tower	2004	Russia	Arkhangelsk	208 m	682 ft	4-sided	
Cimişlia TV Tower	?	Moldova	Cimişlia	208 m	682 ft	4-sided	
Novosemeykino Longwave Transmission, Tower 1	1943	Russia	Novosemeykino	205 m	673 ft	3-sided, military use	demolished in 2010, selfradiating insulated against ground
Novosemeykino Longwave Transmission, Tower 2	1943	Russia	Novosemeykino	205 m	673 ft	3-sided, military use	demolished in 2010, selfradiating insulated against ground
Novosemeykino Longwave Transmission, Tower 3	1943	Russia	Novosemeykino	205 m	673 ft	3-sided, military use	demolished in 2010, selfradiating insulated against ground
Novosemeykino Longwave Transmission, Tower 4	1943	Russia	Novosemeykino	205 m	673 ft	3-sided, military use	demolished in 2010, selfradiating insulated against ground
Cesvaine TV Tower	?	Latvia	Cesvaine	204 m	669 ft	4-sided	
Edineţ TV Tower	?	Moldova	Edineţ	204 m	669 ft	4-sided, 3803 KM	
Rezeknes TV Tower	?	Latvia	Rezeknes	204 m	669 ft	4-sided, 3803 KM	
Valmieras TV Tower	?	Latvia	Valmieras	204 m	669 ft	4-sided	
Antananarivo TV Tower	?	Madagascar	Antananarivo	203 m	665 ft		
Klaipeda Radio and Television Station	1960	Lithuania	Klaipeda	202 m	663 ft	4-sided, 3803 KM	
Daugavpils TV Tower	1956	Latvia	Daugavpils	202 m	663 ft	4-sided	height increased in 1989
WRC TV Tower	1989?	United States	Washington, DC	201.8 m	662 ft	3-sided	
Brisbane Channel 10 TV Tower	?	Australia	Brisbane	201.8 m	662 ft	4-sided	
Orion Tower	2001	Russia	Samara	201 m	660 ft	Hyperboloid structure	
WKBN TV Tower	1976	United States	Youngstown, Ohio	200.3 m	657 ft	3-sided	
Gomel TV Tower	1957	Belarus	Homel	200 m	656 ft	4-sided	
Kirovohrad TV Tower	1964	Ukraine	Kropyvnytskyi	200 m	656 ft	4-sided	
Guangdong TV Tower	1965	China	Guangdong	200 m	656 ft	8-sided	
WMBC TV Tower	1965	United States	Montclair, New Jersey	200 m	656 ft	3-sided	
TV Tower on Mount Papula	1966	Russia	Vyborg	200 m	656 ft	4-sided	
Khust TV Tower	1975	Ukraine	Khust	200 m	656 ft	4-sided	
Olevsk Communication Tower	1989	Ukraine	Olevsk	200 m	656 ft	4-sided	
VRT Zendmast Genk	?	Belgium	Genk	200 m	656 ft	4-sided	
Ciurel Telecommunications Tower	?	Romania	Bucharest	200 m	656 ft	4-sided	
TV5 Transmitter Tower	?	Philippines	Quezon City	200 m	656 ft	4-sided	
St. Petersburg American Tower	1985	United States	St. Petersburg	199.6 m	655 ft	3-sided	
New Krasnoyarsk TV Tower	2013	Russia	Krasnoyarsk	199.4 m	654 ft	4-sided	
Odessa TV Tower	1958	Ukraine	Odessa	199 m	653 ft	4-sided, 3803 KM single platform	
Kherson TV Tower	1994	Ukraine	Kherson	199 m	653 ft	4-sided	
Novosibirsk TV Tower	1957	Russia	Novosibirsk	198 m	650 ft	4-sided, 3803 KM	
Voronezh TV Tower	1958	Russia	Voronezh	198 m	650 ft	4-sided, 3803 KM	
Rádio Transamérica	?	Brazil	São Paulo	198 m	650 ft	3-sided	
Krasnodar TV Tower	1959	Russia	Krasnodar	197 m	646 ft	4-sided, 3803 KM	
Türi Radio Mast	1937	Estonia	Türi	196.6 m	645 ft	3-sided	demolished in 1941. At time of completion was the tallest structure in Northern Europe, built by an American company
Old Yerevan TV Tower	1956	Armenia	Yerevan	196 m	643 ft	4-sided, 3803 KM	demolition date unknown
Chelyabinsk TV Tower	1958	Russia	Chelyabinsk	196 m	643 ft	4-sided, 3803 KM	
Penza Television Centre Transmitter	1958	Russia	Penza	196 m	643 ft	4-sided, 3803 KM	
Rostov TV Tower	1958	Russia	Rostov	196 m	643 ft	4-sided, 3803 KM single platform	
Omsk TV Tower	1959	Kazakhstan	Omsk	196 m	643 ft	4-sided, 3803 KM	
Pärnu TV Tower	1963	Estonia	Pärnu	196 m	643 ft	4-sided, 3803 KM	
Cherkaska TV Tower	1964	Ukraine	Cherkaska	196 m	643 ft	4-sided	
Bilopillia TV Tower	1966	Ukraine	Bilopillia	196 m	643 ft	4-sided	
Trostianets TV Tower	1985	Ukraine	Trostianets	196 m	643 ft	4-sided	
Ivano-Frankivsk TV Tower	1965	Ukraine	Ivano-Frankivsk	195 m	640 ft	4-sided	
Sky Tower West Tokyo	1980	Japan	Tokyo	195 m	640 ft	8-sided non-tapering	
Mulhouse-Belvédère Transmission Tower	1997	France	Mulhouse	195 m	640 ft	3-sided	
Tower at 3710 Marquis St	1992	United States	Garland, Texas	194.2 m	637 ft	3-sided	
Bryansk TV Tower	1958	Russia	Bryansk	194 m	637 ft	4-sided, 3803 KM	
Dnipropetrovsk TV Tower	1958	Ukraine	Dnipropetrovsk	194 m	637 ft	4-sided, 3803 KM single platform	
Lugansk TV Tower	1958	Ukraine	Lugansk	194 m	637 ft	4-sided, 3803 KM single platform	
Kamenske TV Tower	1965	Ukraine	Kamenske	194 m	637 ft	4-sided, 3803 KM	
KSTW-TV Tower	1979	United States	Seattle, Washington	194 m	636 ft	3-sided	
Karaganda TV Tower	19	Kazakhstan	Qaragandy	194 m	635 ft	4-sided, 3803 KM	
Mykolaiv TV Tower	1958	Ukraine	Mykolaiv	193 m	633 ft	4-sided, 3803 KM single platform	
Bishkek TV Tower	1958	Kyrgyzstan	Bishkek	193 m	633 ft	4-sided, 3803 KM	
Ulaanbaatar Radio Station Tower	1967	Mongolia	Ulaanbaatar	193 m	633 ft	4-sided, 3803 KM	
KEZK-FM Tower	1981	United States	St. Louis, Missouri	192.3 m	631 ft	3-sided	
Tallinn TV Mast	1955	Estonia	Tallinn	192 m	630 ft	4-sided, 3803 KM	dismantled in 1984
Yekaterinburg TV Tower (Old)	1955	Russia	Yekaterinburg	192 m	630 ft	4-sided, 3803 KM	
Donetsk TV Tower 1	1956	Ukraine	Donetsk	192 m	630 ft	4-sided	
Baku Communication Tower	1956	Azerbaijan	Baku	192 m	630 ft	4-sided, 3803 KM	demolished in 2008
Irkutsk TV Tower	1957	Russia	Irkutsk	192 m	630 ft	4-sided, 3803 KM	
Murmansk TV Tower	1957	Russia	Murmansk	192 m	630 ft	4-sided, 3803 KM	
Lviv TV Tower	1957	Ukraine	Lviv	192 m	630 ft	4-sided, 3803 KM single platform	
Simferopol TV Tower	1958	Russia	Simferopol	192 m	630 ft	4-sided, 3803 KM single platform	
Ulyanovsk TV Tower	1959	Russia	Ulyanovsk	192 m	630 ft	4-sided, 3803 KM	
Zaporizhzhya TV Tower	1959	Ukraine	Zaporizhzhya	192 m	630 ft	4-sided, 3803 KM single platform	
Lipetsk TV Tower	1960	Russia	Lipetsk	192 m	630 ft	4-sided, 3803 KM	
Annunciation TV Tower	1964	Russia	Blagoveshchensk	192 m	630 ft	4-sided, 3803 KM	
Abakan TV Tower	1965	Russia	Abakan	192 m	630 ft	4-sided, 3803 KM	
Almaty Old TV tower	?	Kazakhstan	Almaty	192 m	630 ft	4-sided, 3803 KM	
Pavlodar TV Tower	?	Kazakhstan	Pavlodar	192 m	630 ft	4-sided, 3803 KM	
Tomsk TV Tower	?	Russia	Tomsk	192 m	630 ft	4-sided, 3803 KM	
Orissaare TV Tower	1965	Estonia	Orissaare	191 m	627 ft	4-sided, 3803 KM	
Leipzig Radio Tower	2015	Germany	Leipzig	191 m	627 ft	4-sided	
LORAN-C transmitter Carolina Beach	1952	United States	Carolina Beach, North Carolina	190.5 m	625 ft		collapsed caused by Hurricane Helene September 26, 1958
Stonehenge Tower	1990	United States	Portland, Oregon	190.5 m	625 ft	solid steel core supported by 3 legs	more likely to be categorized as a steel tower than a lattice tower
Transmitter Sottens, old transmission tower	1948	Switzerland	Sottens	190 m	623 ft	4-sided	demolished in 1989, mediumwave selfradiating tower insulated against ground
Bratsk TV Tower	1963	Russia	Bratsk	190 m	623 ft	4-sided, 3803 KM	
ATV10 Tower	1964	Australia	Melbourne	190 m	623 ft	4-sided	height increase of 10 m (33 ft) in 2001
Cayey Naval Station, Tower 1	1919	United States	Cayey, Puerto Rico	189 m	620 ft	3-sided, Annapolis type military use	demolished in 1938
Cayey Naval Station, Tower 2	1919	United States	Cayey, Puerto Rico	189 m	620 ft	3-sided, Annapolis type military use	demolished in 1938
Cayey Naval Station, Tower 3	1919	United States	Cayey, Puerto Rico	189 m	620 ft	3-sided, Annapolis type military use	demolished in 1938
Cambridge Bay LORAN Tower	1948	Canada	Cambridge Bay	189 m	620 ft	4-sided	demolished in August 2014
Sottens Radio Tower	1989	Switzerland	Sottens	188 m	617 ft	4-sided	mediumwave, selfradiating tower insulated against ground
Soinaste Telemast	1957	Estonia	Tartu	186 m	610 ft	4-sided, 3803 KM	
Chisinau TV Tower	1958	Moldova	Chisinau	186 m	610 ft	4-sided, 3803 KM	
Petrozavodsk TV Tower	1959	Russia	Petrozavodsk	186 m	610 ft	4-sided, 3803 KM	
KIRO TV Tower	1958	United States	Seattle, Washington	186 m	609 ft	3-sided	
Santa Palomba transmitter, Main Tower	?	Italy	Santa Palomba	186 m	609 ft	4-sided	equipped with cage antenna for mediumwave broadcasting
Ovce Pole Radio Tower	?	Macedonia	Lozovo	185 m	608 ft	4-sided	
Semipalatinsk TV Tower	?	Kazakhstan	Semey	185 m	608 ft	4-sided, 3803 KM	
Ekibastuz TV Tower	1967	Kazakhstan	Ekibastuz	185 m	607 ft	4-sided, 3803 KM	
Vlessart TV Tower	?	Belgium	Rue Vlessart Airmont Léglise	185 m	607 ft	4-sided, horizontal bars of frame are fixed at the centre column	
Anderlues TV Tower	?	Belgium	Anderlues	185 m	607 ft	4-sided	
Tower at 4800 Reagan Drive	2004	United States	Charlotte, North Carolina	184.4 m	605 ft	3-sided	
Brisbane ABQ TV Tower	1959	Australia	Brisbane	184.3 m	605 ft	4-sided	27°27′52″S 152°56′51″E
KWEX TV Tower	1998	United States	San Antonio, Texas	184.1 m	604 ft	3-sided	
NAA (Virginia), Tower 1	1913	United States	Arlington, Virginia	183 m	600 ft	4-sided, military use	dismantled in 1941, was the first of many US Naval radio transmitting station, it was the tallest lattice tower in the United States when built and second tallest in the world after the Eiffel Tower the site also featured two 450-foot tall lattice towers which were possibly the 3rd and 4th tallest in the world at that time
US Naval Communications Station Balboa - Panama, Tower 1	1914	United States (Now Panama)	Balboa	183 m	600 ft	3-sided, Annapolis type military use	6 towers on site built by the US Navy, began operations in 1912, tower possibly demolished in 1993, site returned to Panama in 1996 and station decommissioned by 1999
US Naval Communications Station Balboa - Panama, Tower 2	1914	United States (Now Panama)	Balboa	183 m	600 ft	3-sided, Annapolis type military use	demolished by 1999
US Naval Communications Station Balboa - Panama, Tower 3	1914	United States (Now Panama)	Balboa	183 m	600 ft	3-sided, Annapolis type military use	demolished by 1999
US Naval Communications Station Balboa - Panama, Tower 4	1914	United States (Now Panama)	Balboa	183 m	600 ft	3-sided, Annapolis type military use	demolished by 1999
US Naval Communications Station Balboa - Panama, Tower 5	1914	United States (Now Panama)	Balboa	183 m	600 ft	3-sided, Annapolis type military use	demolished by 1999
US Naval Communications Station Balboa - Panama, Tower 6	1914	United States (Now Panama)	Balboa	183 m	600 ft	3-sided, Annapolis type military use	demolished by 1999
Naval Station Sangley Point, Tower 1	1915	United States (Now Philippines)	Cavite	183 m	600 ft	3-sided, Annapolis type military use	demolished in 1971, 3 towers on site built by the US Navy
Naval Station Sangley Point, Tower 2	1915	United States (Now Philippines)	Cavite	183 m	600 ft	3-sided, Annapolis type military use	demolished in 1971
Naval Station Sangley Point, Tower 3	1915	United States (Now Philippines)	Cavite	183 m	600 ft	3-sided, Annapolis type military use	demolished in 1971
Chollas Heights Naval Radio Transmitting Facility, Tower 1	1917	United States	San Diego	183 m	600 ft	3-sided, Annapolis type military use	demolished in 1995, 3 towers on site built by the US Navy
Chollas Heights Naval Radio Transmitting Facility, Tower 2	1917	United States	San Diego	183 m	600 ft	3-sided, Annapolis type military use	demolished in 1995
Chollas Heights Naval Radio Transmitting Facility, Tower 3	1917	United States	San Diego	183 m	600 ft	3-sided, Annapolis type military use	demolished in 1995
US Naval Radio Station Pearl Harbor, Tower 1	1917	United States	Pearl Harbor	183 m	600 ft	3-sided, Annapolis type military use	dismantled in 1936, the transmitters were later used at Lualualei Naval Radio Transmitting Facility
US Naval Radio Station Pearl Harbor, Tower 2	1917	United States	Pearl Harbor	183 m	600 ft	3-sided, Annapolis type military use	dismantled in 1936
US Naval Radio Station Pearl Harbor, Tower 3	1917	United States	Pearl Harbor	183 m	600 ft	3-sided, Annapolis type military use	dismantled in 1936
NSS Annapolis, Tower 1	1918	United States	Annapolis	183 m	600 ft	3-sided, Annapolis type military use	demolished in 1969. The site originally had a total of 9 self-supporting 600-foot tall the most lattice towers of that height ever built in a single location. Four were built in 1918, two more in 1922 and the final three in 1938. The 6 towers built in 1918 & 1922 were demolished in 1969 while the 3 towers built in 1938 remain today. Tied for tallest lattice towers in the United States from 1918 to 1949
NSS Annapolis, Tower 2	1918	United States	Annapolis	183 m	600 ft	3-sided, Annapolis type military use	demolished in 1969
NSS Annapolis, Tower 3	1918	United States	Annapolis	183 m	600 ft	3-sided, Annapolis type military use	demolished in 1969
NSS Annapolis, Tower 4	1918	United States	Annapolis	183 m	600 ft	3-sided, Annapolis type military use	demolished in 1969
NSS Annapolis, Tower 5	1922	United States	Annapolis	183 m	600 ft	3-sided, Annapolis type military use	demolished in 1969
NSS Annapolis, Tower 6	1922	United States	Annapolis	183 m	600 ft	3-sided, Annapolis type military use	demolished in 1969
NSS Annapolis, Tower 7	1938	United States	Annapolis	183 m	600 ft	3-sided Annapolis type	3 towers remaining, site previously had a total of 9 towers
NSS Annapolis, Tower 8	1938	United States	Annapolis	183 m	600 ft	3-sided Annapolis type	
NSS Annapolis, Tower 9	1938	United States	Annapolis	183 m	600 ft	3-sided Annapolis type	
Lualualei Naval Radio Transmitting Facility, Tower 1	1936	United States	Lualualei	183 m	600 ft	3-sided, Annapolis type military use	demolished in 1972, 7 possibly 8 towers on site built by the US Navy, these were later replaced in 1972 with two 1,500-foot tall guyed masts
Lualualei Naval Radio Transmitting Facility, Tower 2	1936	United States	Lualualei	183 m	600 ft	3-sided, Annapolis type military use	demolished in 1972
Lualualei Naval Radio Transmitting Facility, Tower 3	1936	United States	Lualualei	183 m	600 ft	3-sided, Annapolis type military use	demolished in 1972
Lualualei Naval Radio Transmitting Facility, Tower 4	1936	United States	Lualualei	183 m	600 ft	3-sided, Annapolis type military use	demolished in 1972
Lualualei Naval Radio Transmitting Facility, Tower 5	1936	United States	Lualualei	183 m	600 ft	3-sided, Annapolis type military use	demolished in 1972
Lualualei Naval Radio Transmitting Facility, Tower 6	1936	United States	Lualualei	183 m	600 ft	3-sided, Annapolis type military use	demolished in 1972
Lualualei Naval Radio Transmitting Facility, Tower 7	1936	United States	Lualualei	183 m	600 ft	3-sided, Annapolis type military use	demolished in 1972
Criggion VLF transmitter, Tower 1	1941	UK	Criggion, Powys	182.9 m	600 ft	4-sided, military use	demolished in 2003
Criggion VLF transmitter, Tower 2	1941	UK	Criggion, Powys	182.9 m	600 ft	4-sided, military use	demolished in 2003
Criggion VLF transmitter, Tower 3	1941	UK	Criggion, Powys	182.9 m	600 ft	4-sided, military use	demolished in 2003
Mulhouse-Belvédère Transmission, Old Tower	1955	France	Mulhouse	182.9 m	600 ft	3-sided	demolished in 1998
TV Tower RTPTS Berezniki	1961	Russia	Berezniki	183 m	600 ft	4-sided, 3803 KM	
Tower at 503 Mcarthur Drive	2016	United States	New Bedford, Massachusetts	182.9 m	600 ft	3-sided	
Launch Pad 39b Tower 1	2022	United States	Titusville, Florida	182.9 m	600 ft	3-sided	
Launch Pad 39b Tower 2	2022	United States	Titusville, Florida	182.9 m	600 ft	3-sided	
Launch Pad 39b Tower 3	2022	United States	Titusville, Florida	182.9 m	600 ft	3-sided	
Ryazan TV Tower	1956	Russia	Ryazan	182.5 m	599 ft	4-sided, 3803 KM	
Nizhny Novgorod TV Tower	1957	Russia	Nizhny Novgorod	182 m	597 ft	4-sided, 3803 KM	
Old Ufa TV Tower	1958	Russia	Ufa	182 m	597 ft	4-sided, 3803 KM	
Old Perm TV Tower	1958	Russia	Perm	182 m	597 ft	4-sided, 3803 KM	
Kazan TV Tower	1959	Russia	Kazan	182 m	597 ft	4-sided, 3803 KM	
Tower (formerly) located on the State Fair of Texas grounds	?	United States	Dallas, Texas	181.5 m	596 ft	3-sided	dismantled in 2016
Old WBNS TV Tower	1948	United States	Columbus, Ohio	181.3 m	595 ft	3-sided	original WBNS tower, replaced by a taller tower in 1955
KSTP TV Tower	1948	United States	Saint Paul, Minnesota	181.1 m	594 ft	3-sided	
Old WSTM-TV Tower	1953	United States	Syracuse, New York	181.0 m	594 ft	4-sided	demolished in 2003
WQED TV Tower	1954	United States	Pittsburgh, Pennsylvania	181.1 m	594 ft	3-sided candelabra top	
KCTS TV Tower Tower	1965	United States	Seattle, Washington	181.1 m	594 ft	3-sided	
Tower on Mamayev Kurgan	1956	Russia	Volgograd	180 m	591 ft	4-sided, 3803 KM	
Vladimirskaya TV Tower	1956	Russia	Vladimirskaya	180 m	591 ft	4-sided, 3803 KM	
Old Krasnoyarsk TV Tower	1957	Russia	Krasnoyarsk	180 m	591 ft	4-sided, 3803 KM	
Samara TV Tower	1957	Russia	Samara	180 m	591 ft	4-sided, 3803 KM	
Kemerovo TV Tower	1958	Russia	Kemerovo	180 m	591 ft	4-sided, 3803 KM	
Sochi TV Tower	1958	Russia	Sochi	180 m	591 ft	4-sided, 3803 KM	
KRTPTS Eagle's Nest	1959	Russia	Vladivostok	180 m	591 ft	4-sided, 3803 KM	
Arzamas TV Tower	1960	Russia	Arzamas	180 m	591 ft	4-sided, 3803 KM	
Tambov TV Tower	1960	Russia	Tambov	180 m	591 ft	4-sided, 3803 KM	
Yoshkar-Ola TV Tower	1960	Russia	Yoshkar-Ola	180 m	591 ft	4-sided, 3803 KM	
Astrakhan TV Tower	1961	Russia	Astrakhan	180 m	591 ft	4-sided, 3803 KM	
Cheboksary TV Tower	1961	Russia	Cheboksary	180 m	591 ft	4-sided, 3803 KM	
Kurgan TV Tower	1961	Russia	Kurgan	180 m	591 ft	4-sided, 3803 KM	
Leninsk-Kuznetsky TV Tower	1962	Russia	Leninsk-Kuznetsky	180 m	591 ft	4-sided, 3803 KM	
Magnitogorsk TV Tower	1962	Russia	Magnitogorsk	180 m	591 ft	4-sided, 3803 KM	
Novokuznetsk TV Tower	1962	Russia	Novokuznetsk	180 m	591 ft	4-sided, 3803 KM	
Tula TV Tower	1963	Russia	Tula	180 m	591 ft	4-sided, 3803 KM	
Khabarovsk TV Tower	1964	Russia	Khabarovsk	180 m	591 ft	4-sided, 3803 KM	
Syktyvkar TV Tower	1964	Russia	Syktyvkar	180 m	591 ft	4-sided, 3803 KM	
Donetsk TV Tower 2	1964	Ukraine	Donetsk	180 m	591 ft	4-sided, 3803 KM	
Yarok TV and Radio Tower	1964	Ukraine	Yarok	180 m	591 ft	4-sided, 3803 KM	
Kokshetau TV Tower	1965	Kazakhstan	Kokshetau	180 m	591 ft	4-sided with lateral supports added in 2002 for vertical stability after washout	
Nalchik TV Tower	1967	Russia	Nalchik	180 m	591 ft	4-sided, 3803 KM	
Andriivka TV Tower	1969	Ukraine	Andriivka	180 m	591 ft	4-sided	
Kotovsk Communication Tower	1972	Ukraine	Vesternychany	180 m	591 ft	4-sided, 3803 KM	
Mezhdurechenskaya TV tower	1972	Russia	Mezhdurechensk	180 m	591 ft	4-sided, 3803 KM	
Chongqing Radio & TV Tower	1973	China	Yuzhong, Chongqing CQ	180 m	591 ft	4-sided	
Kuldiga TV Tower	?	Latvia	Kuldiga	180 m	591 ft	4-sided, 3803 KM	
Uralsvyazinform tower	2003	Russia	Perm	180 m	591 ft	Hyperboloid structure	
Aktobe TV Tower	?	Kazakhstan	Aktobe	180 m	591 ft	4-sided, 3803 KM	
Ust-Kamenogorsk TV Tower	?	Kazakhstan	Oskemen	180 m	591 ft	4-sided, 3803 KM	
Petropavlovsk TV Tower	?	Kazakhstan	Oskemen	180 m	591 ft	4-sided, 3803 KM	
Makhachkala TV Tower	?	Russia	Makhachkala	180 m	591 ft	4-sided, 3803 KM	
Tobolsk TV Tower	?	Russia	Tobolsk	180 m	591 ft	4-sided, 3803 KM	
Tyumen TV Tower	?	Russia	Tyumen	180 m	591 ft	4-sided, 3803 KM	
Tashkent Old TV Tower	?	Uzbekistan	Tashkent	180 m	591 ft	4-sided, 3803 KM	
Gyumri TV Tower	?	Armenia	Gyumri	180 m	591 ft	4-sided, 3803 KM	
Nagoya TV Tower	1954	Japan	Nagoya	180 m	590 ft	4-sided	
Smolensk TV Tower	1957	Russia	Smolensk	180 m	590 ft		
Funabashi Miyama Broadcasting Station A Radio Tower	1970	Japan	Tokyo	180 m	590 ft	4-sided	
KDFW TV Tower	1949	United States	Dallas, Texas	179 m	587 ft	4-sided	current height 149.8 m (491 ft)
WTOB-TV Tower	1953	United States	Winston-Salem, North Carolina	178.61 m	586 ft	3-sided	Removed 1967, more than a decade after the TV station closed. Was lit yearly at Christmas from 1957 to 1966.
1230 East Mermaid Lane Tower	1957	United States	Wyndmoor, Pennsylvania	178 m	585 ft	3-sided	
WTNV Tower	1947	United States	Jackson, Tennessee	176.8 m	580 ft	4-sided	collapsed caused by tornado on May 4, 2003
KGO-TV Tower	1949	United States	San Francisco, California	176.8 m	580 ft	3-sided	demolished in 1972 to make way for the Sutro Tower
Ministry of Defense Building B	1996	Japan	Tokyo	177 m	580 ft	12-sided, built on top of a building	total height including building is 722 ft (220 m)
Balashikha Tower	?	Russia	Balashikha	176 m	577 ft	4-sided non-tapering	
Old WLWT TV Tower	1948	United States	Cincinnati	173.7 m	570 ft	4-sided	dismantled in 2005, replaced by the WLWT TV Tower
KING TV Tower	1952	United States	Seattle, Washington	174 m	570 ft	4-sided	
KGHL Tower	1928	United States	Billings	173 m	568 ft	3-sided	demolished in 2020
Hirano Radio Tower	1971	Japan	Saitama	173 m	568 ft	solid central core supported with 4 legs,	central core possibly made out of concrete?
Tower at 777 Winks Lane	?	United States	Bensalem, PA	173.1 m	568 ft	3-sided	
WDET Tower	1996	United States	Detroit, Michigan	172.5 m	566 ft	3-sided	
KOMO TV Tower	1952	United States	Seattle, Washington	172 m	564 ft	3-sided	
Yokohama Radio Tower	?	Japan	Yokohama	172 m	564 ft	4-sided	35°31'28.15"N 139°39'50.84"E
Bell Canada Pharmacy Avenue Tower	1970	Canada	Toronto	160 m	563 ft	3-sided non-tapering	
Tower at 1230 East Mermaid Lane	?	United States	Wyndmoor, PA	171.3 m	562 ft	3-sided	
Original TCN TV Tower	1956	Australia	Sydney	171 m	561 ft	4-sided	demolished in 1966
Rimavská Sobota SW Transmitter, Tower 1	1956	Slovakia	Rimavská Sobota	171 m	561 ft	4-sided	4 identical towers
Rimavská Sobota SW Transmitter, Tower 2	1956	Slovakia	Rimavská Sobota	171 m	561 ft	4-sided	
Rimavská Sobota SW Transmitter, Tower 3	1956	Slovakia	Rimavská Sobota	171 m	561 ft	4-sided	
Rimavská Sobota SW Transmitter, Tower 4	1956	Slovakia	Rimavská Sobota	171 m	561 ft	4-sided	
Hearst Stations Tower	1957	United States	Sacramento, California	170.2 m	558 ft	3-sided	
Tower at 2740 South Freeway	1992	United States	Fort Worth, Texas	170.1 m	558 ft	4-sided	
WHHL-FM Tower	2008	United States	St. Louis, Missouri	170.1 m	558 ft	3-sided	
Rimavská Sobota SW Transmitter, Tower 5	1956	Slovakia	Rimavská Sobota	170 m	558 ft	4-sided	
Rimavská Sobota SW Transmitter, Tower 6	1956	Slovakia	Rimavská Sobota	170 m	558 ft	4-sided	
Gore Hill ABC TV Tower	1957	Australia	Sydney	170 m	558 ft	4-sided	
VRT Zendmast Oostvleteren	1969	Belgium	Oostvleteren	170 m	558 ft	4-sided	
WTVH TV Tower	1948	United States	Syracuse, New York	169.5 m	556 ft	4-sided	
KSAT TV Tower	1957	United States	San Antonio, Texas	168.9 m	554 ft	3-sided	
Gaocheng TV Tower	?	China	Gaocheng	168 m	551 ft		
WWVR Tower	1954	United States	Terre Haute, Indiana	167.6 m	550 ft	3-sided	
Yiye Avila Tower	1991	United States	Utuado, Puerto Rico	167 m	548 ft	Landmark tower design	collapsed caused by Hurricane Maria September 2017
VRT Zendmast Schoten	1969	Belgium	Schoten	167 m	548 ft	4-sided	
KNBC Mount Wilson Tower	1998	United States	Mount Wilson, California	166 m	545 ft	4-sided	
KSEG TV Tower	?	United States	Sacramento, California	166 m	542 ft	3-sided	
CBC Jarvis St. Tower	1952	Canada	Toronto	164.6 m	540 ft	4-sided	demolished in 2002
RTBF Profondeville	?	Belgium	Riviere	164 m	538 ft		
KCCI TV Tower	1985	United States	Des Moines, Iowa	163.6 m	537 ft	3-sided	
TV Tower Tournai-Froidmont	1967	Belgium	Tournai-Froidmont	163 m	535 ft	4-sided	
WJAR TV Tower	2013	United States	Rehoboth, Massachusetts	162.7 m	534 ft	4-sided	
WRAT Tower	?	United States	Lake Como, NJ	162.5 m	533 ft	3-sided	
WXRT Tower	1971	United States	Chicago, Illinois	162.2 m	532 ft	3-sided	
Higashiyama TV Tower	1969	Japan	Nagoya	162 m	532 ft	4-sided	
WOWT TV Tower	1949	United States	Omaha, Nebraska	161.6 m	530 ft	3-sided	
Tower at 2599 Palumbo Drive	1991	United States	Lexington, Kentucky	161.5 m	530 ft	3-sided, 8-sided top	
Ishikawa TV Broadcasting Tower		Japan	Kanazawa	162 m	530 ft	solid steel core supported by a 8-sided non-tapering lattice	36°35'17.37"N 136°36'21.62"E
Martina Franca Tower 1	?	Italy	Martina Franca	161 m	528 ft	4-sided	
WIZF Tower	1976	United States	Cincinnati, Ohio	160.9 m	528 ft	4-sided	
KDNL TV Tower	1947	United States	Saint Louis, Missouri	160.8 m	528 ft	4-sided	
Shukhov radio Tower	1922	Russia	Moscow	160 m	525 ft	Hyperboloid structure	
Luch Tower 1	1954	Ukraine	Luch	160 m	525 ft	4-sided	
Luch Tower 2	1954	Ukraine	Luch	160 m	525 ft	4-sided	
Torre Bruxelas	1983	Brazil	São Paulo	160 m	525 ft	4-sided	23°32'36.94"S 46°40'58.31"W
Tverskaya TV Tower	2005	Russia	Tverskaya	160 m	525 ft	4-sided	
Torre da TV Bahia	?	Brazil	Salvador	160 m	525 ft	4-sided	
Canal Tower 4 (Tres Cruces)	?	Uruguay	Montevideo	160 m	525 ft	4-sided	
Ural TV Tower	?	Kazakhstan	Uralsk	160 m	524 ft	4-sided, 3803 KM	
City of Dallas Tower	1983	United States	Dallas, Texas	159.4 m	523 ft	4-sided	
WSAV TV Tower	1956	United States	Savannah, Georgia	159.1 m	522 ft	3-sided	
Chernihiv TV Tower	1959	Ukraine	Chernihiv	159 m	522 ft	4-sided	
Telecomm Antenna	?	Brazil	Rio de Janeiro	159 m	522 ft	4-sided	
To Kannondomachi TV Tower		Japan	Kanazawa	159.5 m	520 ft	4-sided	36°35'22.37"N 136°36'28.83"E
WLLY Tower	1995	United States	Mangonia Park, Florida	158.2 m	519 ft	Landmark tower design	
Zendmast Zichtenburg	2007	Netherlands	The Hague	158 m	518 ft	3-sided	
Skytel Tower	2004	United States	Des Moines	157.8 m	518 ft	3-sided	
WHIO (AM) Tower	1948	United States	Dayton, Ohio	157.6 m	517 ft	4-sided	demolished in 2013
CFCN TV Tower	1960	Canada	Calgary	157.6 m	517 ft	3-sided	
RaTel Tower	1950	Ukraine	Kyiv	157 m	515 ft	4-sided	
Houdeng Radio Tower	?	Belgium	Houdeng	156 m	512 ft	4-sided	selfradiating tower insulated against ground
Tower at 47 S State Avenue	1991	United States	Indianapolis, Indiana	155.4 m	510 ft	3-sided	
Tower at 1220 S Acacia Avenue	1994	United States	Ripon, California	155.4 m	510 ft	3-sided	
Mesquite Tower	1990	United States	Mesquite, Texas	155.3 m	509.5 ft	Landmark tower design	
KETV TV Tower	1957	United States	Omaha, Nebraska	155.1 m	509 ft	3-sided	
RTS TV Tower	1981	Singapore	Bukit Batok	155 m	509 ft	4-sided	replaced the original tower built in 1963
Torre Cultura	1992	Brazil	São Paulo	154.8 m	508 ft	3-sided, rotating 180 degrees on its axis 3 times	
Telecomm Antenna	?	Brazil	Rio de Janeiro	155 m	508 ft	4-sided	22°56'59.59"S 43°13'46.44"W
NOVEC Toren	2005	Netherlands	Zwolle	154.5 m	507 ft	3-sided	
Tower at 4344 Park Heights Avenue	1987	United States	Baltimore, Maryland	154.5 m	507 ft	3-sided	
Tower at 78 Veronica Avenue	2013	United States	Franklin Township, New Jersey	154.5 m	507 ft	3-sided	
Washington Police Department Tower	?	United States	Washington, DC	154.3 m	506 ft	4-sided	
WSB TV Tower	1975	United States	Atlanta, Georgia	154.2 m	506 ft	3-sided	
Tower at 1420 R.Americo Salgado	?	Brazil	Cuiaba	154.2 m	506 ft	4-sided	15°35'12.57"S 56° 5'36.58"W
Old KLDT TV Tower	1990	United States	Lewisville, Texas	153.6 m	504 ft	3-sided	
WOAI TV Tower	2010	United States	San Antonio, Texas	153.3 m	503 ft	3-sided	
TV Bandeirantes Antenna	?	Brazil	Rio de Janeiro	153.3 m	503 ft	4-sided	
Tower at 26501 Renaissance Parkway	1990	United States	Cleveland, Ohio	153 m	502 ft	3-sided	
WRDW TV Tower	1998	United States	Augusta, Georgia	152.7 m	501 ft	3-sided	
Tower at 1060 Gatewood Avenue	2019	United States	Greensboro, North Carolina	152.7 m	501 ft	3-sided	
Original ATN TV Tower	1956	Australia	Sydney	152 m	500 ft	4-sided	demolished in 1973
Croydon Transmitter	1962	UK	London, Surrey	152 m	500 ft	4-sided	
IBC Tower	1978	Philippines	Quezon City	152 m	500 ft	4-sided	
Tower at 4802 Lookaway Drive	1987	United States	Cincinnati, Ohio	152.4 m	500 ft	3-sided	
PTV Television Transmitter	1993	Philippines	Quezon City	152.4 m	500 ft	4-sided	
Tower at 1350 Howell Mill Road	1995	United States	Atlanta, Georgia	152.4 m	500 ft	3-sided	
WKIX (850 AM) Tower	1996	United States	Cary, North Carolina	152.4 m	500 ft	4-sided	
Tower at 15 Van Dyke Avenue	1999	United States	New Brunswick, New Jersey	152.4 m	500 ft	3-sided	
Tower at 180 Freeman Avenue	2000	United States	Islip, NY	152.4 m	500 ft	3-sided	
Cleveland Buckeye Terminals Tower	2000	United States	Cleveland, Ohio	152.4 m	500 ft	3-sided	
Tower at 1810 Jeffries	2000	United States	Dallas, Texas	152.4 m	500 ft	3-sided	
Susquehanna Radio Corp Tower	2001	United States	Dallas, Texas	152.4 m	500 ft	3-sided	
Tower at 2949 2/3 Carr Street	2001	United States	Houston, Texas	152.4 m	500 ft	3-sided	
Tower at 5109 Carder Road	2004	United States	Orlando, Florida	152.4 m	500 ft	3-sided	
TV Globo Digital Tower	2006	Brazil	São Paulo	152.4 m	500 ft	3-sided, built on top of a building	Height confirmed by google earth 3 dimensional building data, location; 23°34'4.36"S 46°39'1.65"W
Tower at 5320 Shepard Drive	2008	United States	Houston, Texas	152.4 m	500 ft	3-sided	
Tower at 2500 Se Loop 820	2011	United States	Fort Worth, Texas	152.4 m	500 ft	4-sided	
City of Conroe Fire Dept. Tower	2011	United States	Spring, Texas	152.4 m	500 ft	3-sided	
Tower at 6922 Katy Road	2012	United States	Houston, Texas	152.4 m	500 ft	3-sided	
San Antonio Police Department Tower	2012	United States	San Antonio, Texas	152.4 m	500 ft	3-sided	
Indian River State College Tower	2013	United States	Fort Pierce, Florida	152.4 m	500 ft	3-sided	
Tower at 19 Oldham Street	2017	United States	Nashville, TN	152.4 m	500 ft	3-sided	
Crown Communications LLC Tower	?	United States	Monroeville, Pennsylvania	152.4 m	500 ft	3-sided	
RKS Mělník-Chloumek	?	Czech Republic	Mělník	152 m	500 ft	4 sided non-tapering	used for Mediumwave
RKS Dobrochov	?	Czech Republic	Dobrochov	152 m	500 ft	4-sided non-tapering	Mediumwave
Antena Califormula Broadcasting	?	Mexico	Tijuana	152 m	500 ft	4-sided	
Federal Hill Road Tower	1970	United States	Pompton Lakes, New Jersey	152.1 m	499 ft	3-sided	
WHBF TV Tower	1950	United States	Rock Island, Illinois	152 m	499 ft	4-sided	
WAFB TV Tower	1951	United States	Baton Rouge, Louisiana	152 m	499 ft	3-sided	second source lists the tower as being 475 ft tall
Tower at 375 Midland Avenue	1981	United States	Detroit, Michigan	152 m	499 ft	3-sided	
WMUZ Tower	1985	United States	Detroit, Michigan	152 m	499 ft	3-sided	
L3Harris Technologies Tower	1992	United States	Key Largo, Florida	152 m	499 ft	3-sided	
Tower at 11149 Trinity Blvd	1997	United States	Fort Worth, Texas	152.2 m	499 ft	4-sided candelabra top	
WFNZ-FM Tower	2000	United States	Charlotte, North Carolina	152.2 m	499 ft	3-sided	
Charlotte American Tower	2001	United States	Charlotte, North Carolina	151 m	499 ft	3-sided candelabra top	
Tower at 14247 Old St. Augustine Road	2002	United States	Jacksonville, Florida	152 m	499 ft	3-sided	
Cumulus Media Tower	2004	United States	Shreveport, Louisiana	152 m	499 ft	Landmark tower design	
WPEC TV Tower	2008	United States	West Palm Beach, Florida	152 m	499 ft	3-sided	
New York AM Radio, LLC Tower 1	2009	United States	North Bergen, New Jersey	152.1 m	499 ft	3-sided	3 towers
New York AM Radio, LLC Tower 2	2009	United States	North Bergen, New Jersey	152.1 m	499 ft	3-sided	
New York AM Radio, LLC Tower 3	2009	United States	North Bergen, New Jersey	152.1 m	499 ft	3-sided	
Tower at 4098 Rolling Stone Lane	2012	United States	St. Louis, Missouri	152.1 m	499 ft	3-sided	
Tower off Schumacher Road	2013	United States	St. Louis, Missouri	152.1 m	499 ft	3-sided	
Tower at 1340 West Outer 21 Road	2013	United States	St. Louis, Missouri	152.1 m	499 ft	3-sided	
AR & JR Radio Tower	2017	United States	Austin, Texas	152 m	499 ft	3-sided candelabra top	
City of Chesapeake Tower	2018	United States	Chesapeake, Virginia	152 m	499 ft	3-sided	
Davidson County Government Tower	2019	United States	Lexington, North Carolina	152 m	499 ft	3-sided	
City of Jackson Tower	?	United States	Jackson, Mississippi	152 m	499 ft	Landmark tower design	
Tower at 2060 15th Avenue South	1999	United States	Nashville, Tennessee	151.8 m	498 ft	3-sided	
4 Broadcast Place Tower	1988	United States	Jacksonville, Florida	151.6 m	497 ft	3-sided	
Tower at 239 East Prairie Avenue	2001	United States	St. Louis, Missouri	151 m	495 ft	3-sided	
Tower at 4702 Mail Service Center	2012	United States	Raleigh, North Carolina	151 m	495 ft	3-sided	
WETA TV Tower	?	United States	Arlington, Virginia	151 m	495 ft	3-sided	
Tour Dégueu	?	Belgium	Leglise-Anlier	151 m	495 ft	4-sided, Top guyed lattice tower, featuring a guyed upper section with four horizontal crossbars	
Tower at 1450 Westpark Way	1996	United States	Fort Worth, Texas	150.6 m	494 ft	4-sided candelabra top	
Old Ust-Kamenogorsk TV Tower	?	Kazakhstan	Oskemen	151 m	494 ft	4-sided, 3803 KM design, shortened	
Tower at 67315 Kirkwood Heights Road	2005	United States	Brookside, Ohio	150.3 m	493 ft	3-sided	
Longwave transmitter Lahti, Tower 1	1927	Finland	Lahti	150 m	492 ft		two towers carrying an antenna for longwave
Longwave transmitter Lahti, Tower 2	1927	Finland	Lahti	150 m	492 ft		
RKS Liblice 1, Tower 1	1931	Czech Republic	Liblice	150 m	492 ft	4-sided, antenna for longwave	demolished in 2004
RKS Liblice 1, Tower 2	1931	Czech Republic	Liblice	150 m	492 ft	4-sided, antenna for longwave	demolished in 2004
Mannesmann Tower (Vienna)	1955	Austria	Vienna	150 m	492 ft	3-sided	demolished in 1987
Vorkuta TV Tower	1958	Russia	Vorkuta	150 m	492 ft	4-sided, 3803 KM design, shortened	
Novgorod TV Tower	1958	Russia	Novgorod	150 m	492 ft	4-sided	
Yokohama Media Tower	1999	Japan	Yokohama	150 m	492 ft	4-sided non-tapering, built on top of a building	total height including building is 253 m (830 ft)
Halle Radio Tower	2005	Germany	Halle	150 m	492 ft	4-sided	
WKVG Tower	2007	United States	Greenville, South Carolina	149.9 m	492 ft	3-sided	
New Ufa TV Tower	2016	Russia	Ufa	150 m	492 ft	4-sided	
RPN Transmitter Tower	?	Philippines	Quezon City	150 m	492 ft	4-sided	
KBC tower	?	Japan	Fukuoka	150 m	492 ft	4-sided	33°35'45.77"N 130°23'44.05"E
NHK/Tohoku/East Japan Broadcasting Tower	?	Japan	Sendai	150 m	492 ft	4-sided	

=== Electrical pylons ===
List of electrical pylons above 150 metres (490 ft)

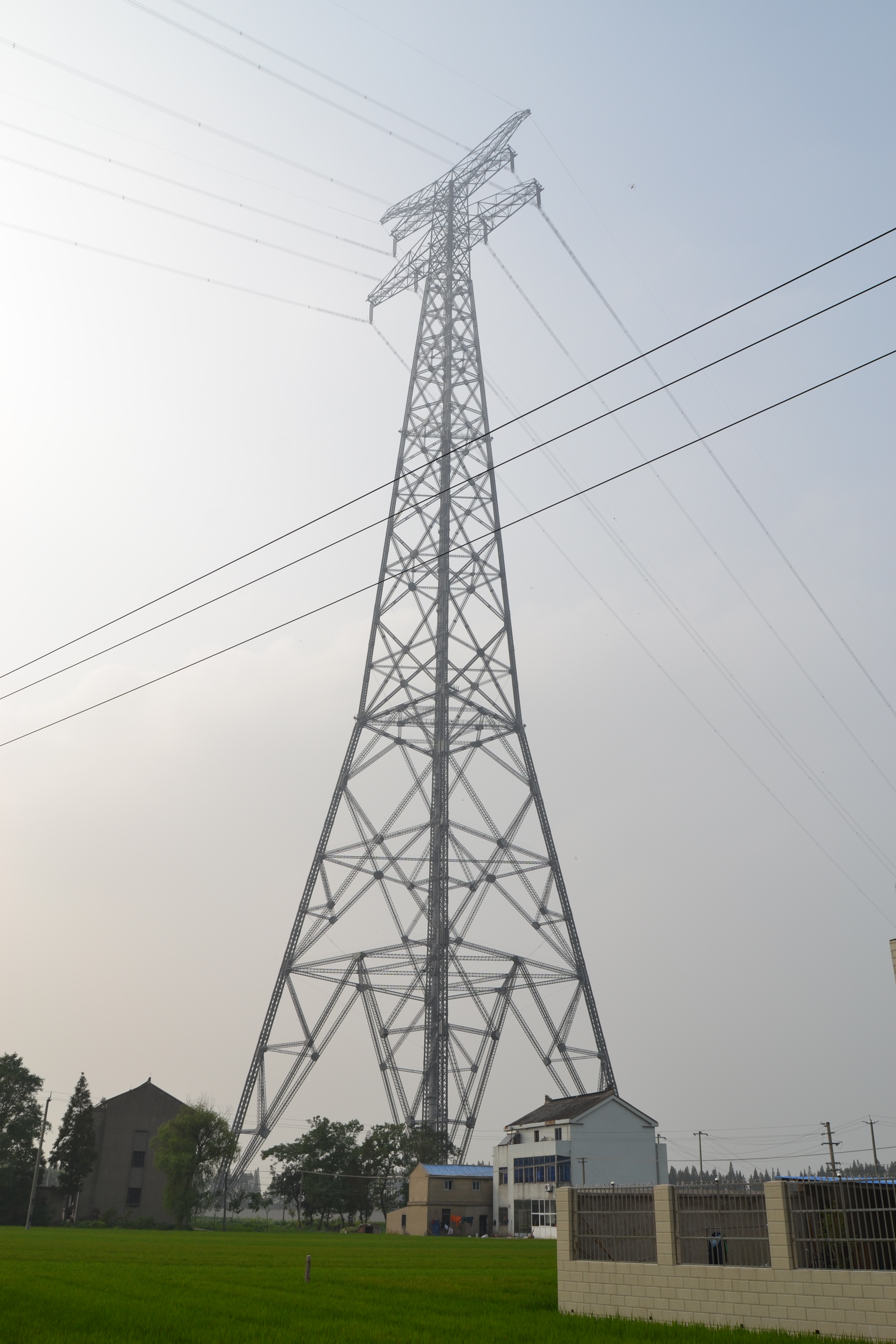
View of one of the Jiangyin lattice towers, the third tallest set of electrical pylons in the world

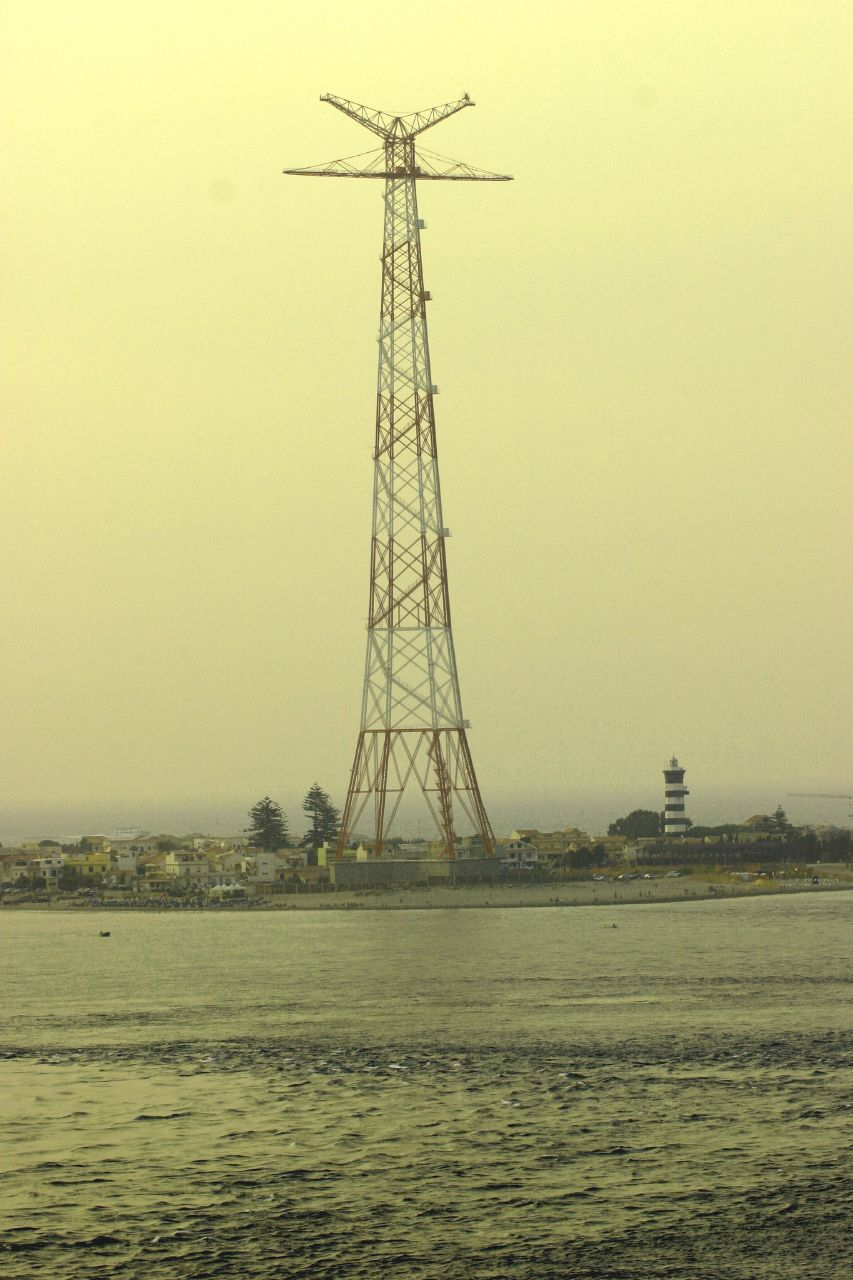
Pylons of Messina formerly connected Europe to Africa. An underwater cable is used today.

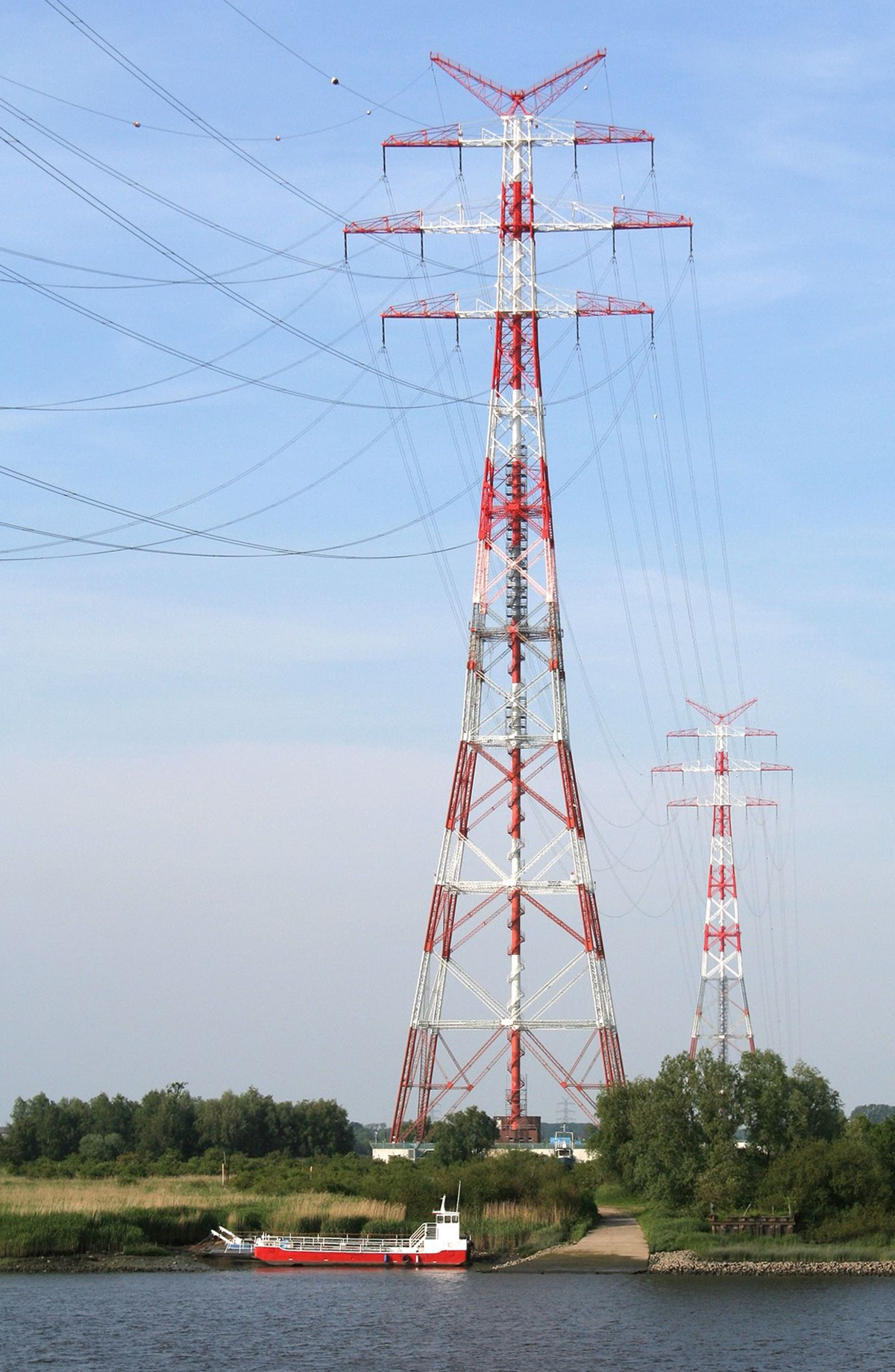
Elbe Crossing 2, the tallest electrical pylons in Germany

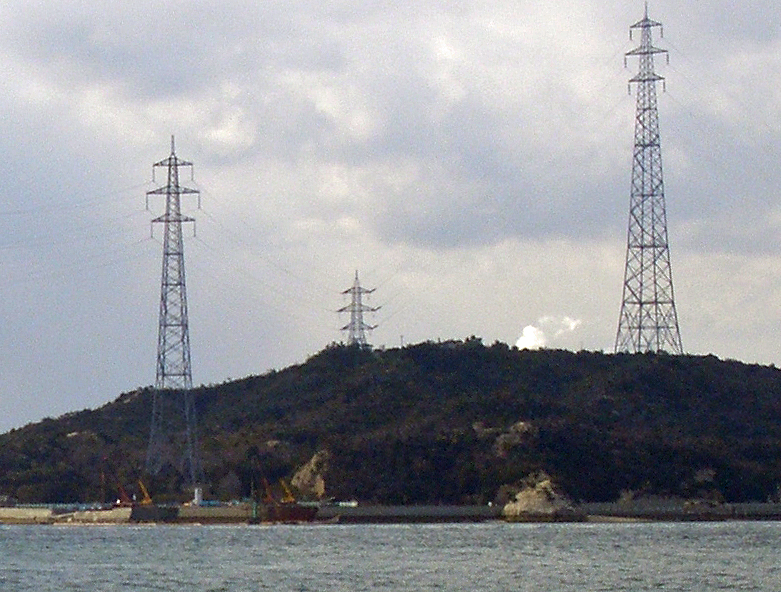
Chūshi Powerline Crossing, the tallest electrical pylons in Japan

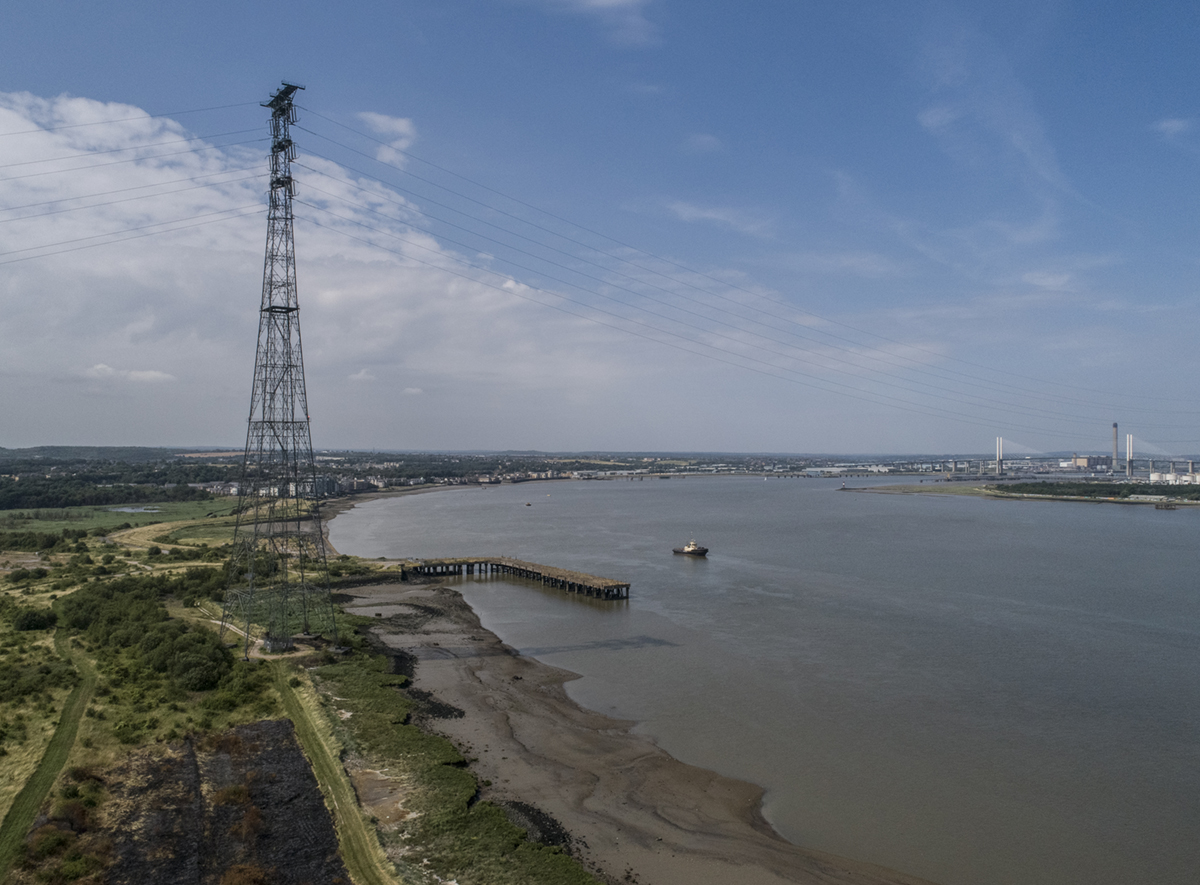
400 kV Thames Crossing, the tallest electrical pylons in the United Kingdom

Tower	Year	Country	Town	Height m	Height ft	Remarks
Yangtze River Crossing Jiangyin 2	2022	China	Jiangyin	385 m	1263 ft	Tallest pylons in the world
Jintang and Cezi islands Overhead Powerline Tie, East Tower	2019	China	Jintang Island	380 m	1247 ft	
Zhoushan Island Overhead Powerline Tie	2009	China	Damao Island	370 m	1214 ft	
Yangtze River Crossing Jiangyin	2003	China	Jiangyin	346.5m	1137 ft	
Amazonas Crossing of Tucuruí transmission line	2012	Brazil	Almeirim	295 m	968 ft	Tallest electricity pylons in South America
Yangtze River crossing of Shanghai-Huainan Powerline	2013	China	Gaogouzhen	269.75	885 ft	
Pylons of Pearl River Crossing	1987	China	Pearl River	253 m & 240 m	830 ft & 787 ft	
Orinoco River Crossing	?	Venezuela	Caroní	240 m	787 ft	
Hooghly River Crossing	?	India	Diamond Harbour	236 m	774 ft	
Pylons of Messina	1957	Italy	Messina	232 m	761 ft	not used as pylons any more, 224 m not including concrete base
HVDC Yangtze River Crossing Wuhu	2003	China	Wuhu	229 m	751 ft	Tallest electricity pylons used for HVDC
Elbe Crossing 2	1976–1978	Germany	Stade	227 m	744 ft	
Chūshi Powerline Crossing	1962	Japan	Takehara	226 m	742 ft	Tallest electricity pylons in Japan
Daqi-Channel-Crossing	1997	Japan	Takehara	223 m	732 ft	
Overhead line crossing Suez Canal	1998	Egypt		221 m	725 ft	
Yamen Steel Tube Tower	2005	China	Jiangmen	215 m	707 ft	
Yangzi River Crossing of HVDC Xianjiaba – Shanghai	2009	China	???	202 m	663 ft	
Balakovo 500 kV Wolga Crossing, Tower East	?	Russia	Balakovo	197 m	646 ft	
LingBei-Channel-Crossing	1993	Japan	Reihoku	195 m	640 ft	
Doel Schelde Powerline Crossing 2	2019	Belgium	Antwerpen	192 m	630 ft	Second crossing of Schelde River
400 kV Thames Crossing	1965	UK	West Thurrock	190 m	623 ft	
Elbe Crossing 1	1958–1962	Germany	Stade	189 m	620 ft	
Kogushi Electric Power Transmission Tower	1994	Japan	Okayama	185 m	607 ft	
Antwerp Deurganck dok crossing	2000	Belgium	Antwerpen	178 m	584 ft	Crossing for a container quay
Línea de Transmisión Carapongo – Carabayllo	2015	Perú	Lima	176 m	577 ft	Crossing of Rimac River
Tracy Saint Lawrence River Powerline Crossing	?	Canada	Tracy	174.6 m	573 ft	tallest electricity pylon in Canada
Rio Vista Birds Landing Powerline Crossing	2025	United States	Rio Vista, California	172.2 m & 166.1 m	565 ft & 545 ft	Tallest electricity pylons in the United States
Doel Schelde Powerline Crossing	?	Belgium	Antwerp	170 m	558 ft	
Sunshine Mississippi Powerline Crossing	1967	United States	St. Gabriel, Louisiana	164.6 m	540 ft	
Lekkerkerk Crossing 1	1970	Netherlands	Lekkerkerk	163 m	534 ft	Tallest crossing in the Netherlands
Bosporus overhead line crossing III	1999	Turkey	Istanbul	160 m	525 ft	
Balakovo 500 kV Wolga Crossing, Tower West	?	Russia	Balakovo	159 m	522 ft	
Pylons of Cadiz	?	Spain	Cadiz	158 m	519 ft	
Mississippi River Crossing at Montz	1991	United States	Montz	152.1 m	499 ft	
Amazonas Crossing of Tucuruí transmission line at Jurupari island	2012	Brazil	Almeirim	150 m	492 ft	
Maracaibo Bay Powerline Crossing	?	Venezuela	Maracaibo	150 m	492 ft	Towers on caissons

=== Wind turbines ===
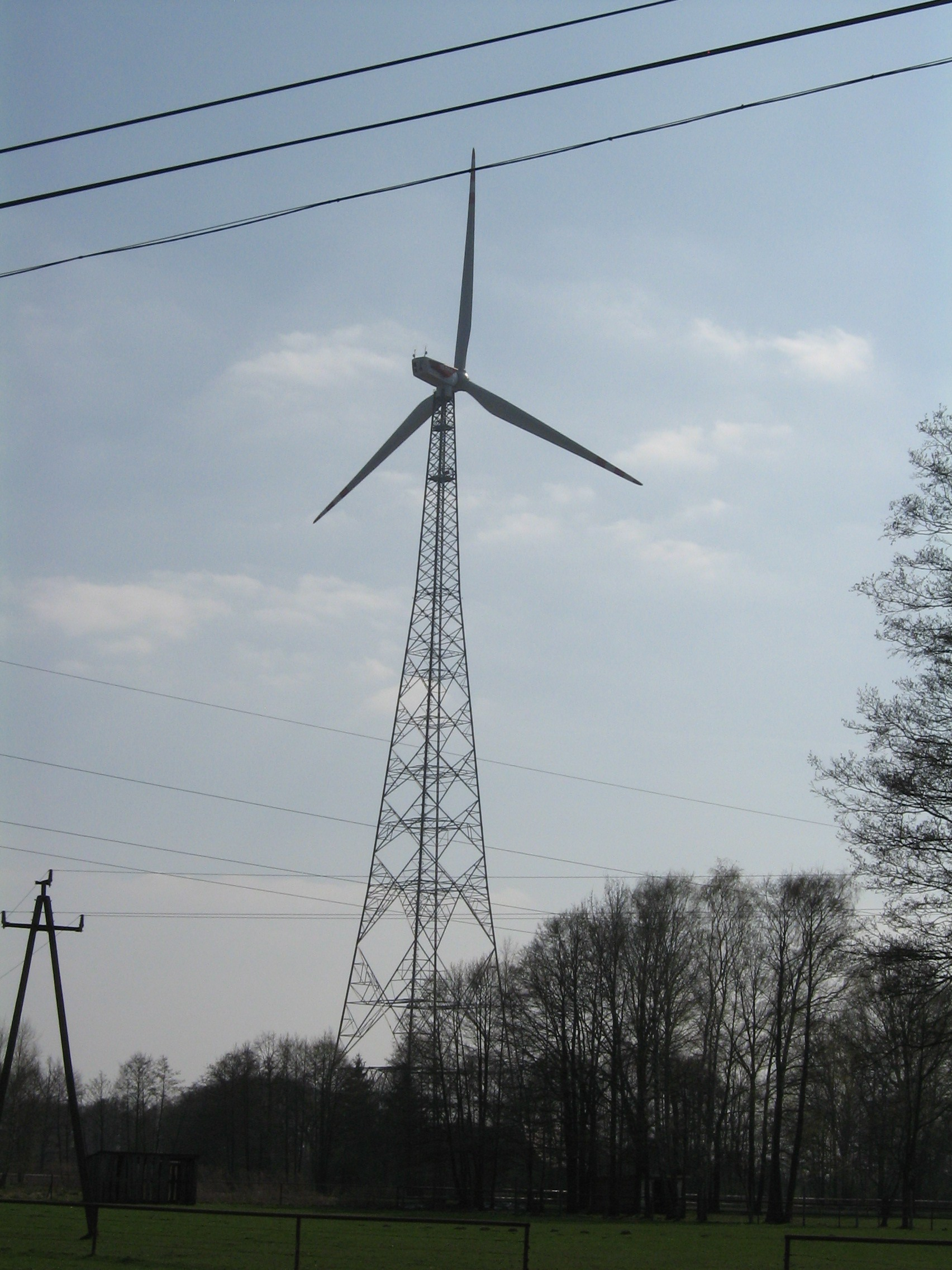
The Nowy Tomyśl Wind Turbines

Tall wind turbines supported by lattice towers have been built almost exclusively in Germany, one of the first countries in the world to build widespread renewable energy infrastructure, including the worlds first supertall wind turbine currently under-construction in Schipkau, Lusatia. The total height includes the lattice tower and the wind turbine rotor at peak height.

List of wind turbines with a lattice tower above 150 m / 500 ft in height.

Tower	Year	Country	Town	meters	feet	Remarks
Schipkau Wind Turbine	2026	Germany	Schipkau, Lusatia	365 m	1198 ft	300 m tall tower, rotor diameter of 126 m, hub diameter of 4 m, currently under construction
Nowy Tomyśl Wind Turbines	2012	Poland	Nowy Tomyśl, Poland	210 m	689 ft	160 m tall tower, rotor diameter of 100 m
Fuhrländer Wind Turbine Laasow	2006	Germany	Laasow, Brandenburg	205 m	673 ft	160 m tall tower, rotor diameter of 90 m
Fuhrländer Wind Turbines Spremberg	2009	Germany	Spremberg, Brandenburg	191 m	627 ft	141 m tall tower, rotor diameter of 100 m, 9 units
Laubersreuth Fuhrländer Wind Turbines	2010	Germany	Münchberg, Bavaria	191 m	627 ft	141 m tall tower, rotor diameter of 100 m, 2 units
Ewiger Fuhrmann Vestas V66 Wind Turbine	2000	Germany	Kreuztal, North Rhine-Westphalia	150 m	492 ft	117 m tall tower, rotor diameter of 66 m
Oyten Vestas V-66 Wind Turbines	2000/2002	Germany	Oyten, Lower-Saxony	150 m	492 ft	117 m tall tower, rotor diameter of 66 m, 2 units
Elspe Fuhrländer FL 77 Wind Turbine	2001	Germany	Elspe, North Rhine-Westphalia	150 m	492 ft	111.5 m tall tower, rotor diameter of 77 m,
Melle Südwind S77 Wind Turbines	2001/2003	Germany	Melle, Lower Saxony	150 m	492 ft	111.5 m tall tower, rotor diameter of 77 m, 6 units
Heisberg Südwind S77 Wind Turbine	2002	Germany	Freudenberg, North Rhine-Westphalia	150 m	492 ft	111.5 m tall tower, rotor diameter of 77 m,
Wallmersbach Südwind S77 Wind Turbine	2002	Germany	Uffenheim, Bavaria	150 m	492 ft	111.5 m tall tower, rotor diameter of 77 m,
Achim Vestas V66 Wind Turbines	2002	Germany	Achim, Lower Saxony	150 m	492 ft	117 m tall tower, rotor diameter of 66 m, 3 units
Badbergen Südwind S70\1500 wind turbines	2002	Germany	Badbergen, Lower-Saxony	150 m	492 ft	114.5 m tall tower, rotor diameter of 70 m 12 units
Dinklage Südwind S70\1500 Wind Turbines	2002	Germany	Dinklage, Lower Saxony	150 m	492 ft	114.5 m tall tower, rotor diameter of 70 m 5 units
Beedenbostel Vestas V66 Wind Turbines	2002	Germany	Beedenbostel, Lower Saxony	150 m	492 ft	117 m tall tower, rotor diameter of 66 m, 5 units
Büddenstedt Südwind S77 Wind Turbines	2002	Germany	Helmstedt, Lower Saxony	150 m	492 ft	111.5 m tall tower, rotor diameter of 77 m, 2 units
Schwagstorf Südwind S70\1500 Wind Turbines	2002	Germany	Ostercappeln, Lower Saxony	150 m	492 ft	114.5 m tall tower, rotor diameter of 70 m 12 units
Kamp-Lintfort Südwind S77 Wind Turbines	2003	Germany	Kamp-Lintfort, North Rhine-Westphalia	150 m	492 ft	111.5 m tall tower, rotor diameter of 77 m, 2 units
Wetzdorf REpower MD77 Wind Turbines	2003	Germany	Wetzdorf, Thuringia	150 m	492 ft	111.5 m tall tower, rotor diameter of 77 m, 2 units
Hilgershausen Südwind S77 Wind Turbines	2003/ 2004	Germany	Felsberg, Hesse	150 m	492 ft	111.5 m tall tower, rotor diameter of 77 m, 2 units
Kirchlinteln Vestas V66 Wind Turbines	2004	Germany	Kirchlinteln, Lower Saxony	150 m	492 ft	117 m tall tower, rotor diameter of 66 m, 4 units
Engelsberg Windpark	2004	Germany	Olpe, North Rhine-Westphalia	150 m	492 ft	111.5 m tall tower, rotor diameter of 77 m
Dretzen Fuhrländer FL 77 Wind Turbines	2005	Germany	Dretzen, Brandenburg	150 m	492 ft	111.5 m tall tower, rotor diameter of 77 m, 10 units
Bad Laer Nordex N90 Wind Turbine	2005	Germany	Bad Laer, Lower Saxony	150 m	492 ft	105 m tall tower, rotor diameter of 90 m
Achmer Nordex N90 wind turbines	2006	Germany	Achmer, Lower-Saxony	150 m	492 ft	105 m tall tower, rotor diameter of 90 m, 9 units
Alfhausen Nordex N90 wind turbines		Germany	Alfhausen, Lower-Saxony	150 m	492 ft	105 m tall tower, rotor diameter of 90 m, 12 units
Nike Laakdal Wind Park	2006	Belgium	Laakdal	150 m	492 ft	111.5 m tall tower, rotor diameter of 77 m, 6 units
Voltlage Nordex S77 wind turbines	2006	Germany	Voltlage, Lower-Saxony	150 m	492 ft	111.5 m tall tower, rotor diameter of 77 m, 7 units
Pattensen REpower MD77 Wind Turbine	2007	Germany	Pattensen, Lower Saxony	150 m	492 ft	111.5 m tall tower, rotor diameter of 77 m
Kölkebeck REpower MD77 Wind Turbines	2007	Germany	Kölkebeck, North Rhine-Westphalia	150 m	492 ft	111.5 m tall tower, rotor diameter of 77 m, 2 units
Schorbus REpower MD77 Wind Turbines	2007	Germany	Schorbus, Brandenburg	150 m	492 ft	111.5 m tall tower, rotor diameter of 77 m, 2 units
Illerich Fuhrländer FL 77 Wind Turbines	2005	Germany	Illerich, Rheinland-Pfalz	150 m	492 ft	111.5 m tall tower, rotor diameter of 77 m, 2 units
Glandorf Fuhrländer FL 70 Wind Turbine	2003	Germany	Glandorf, Lower Saxony	149.5 m	491 ft	114.5 m tall tower, rotor diameter of 70 m
Wustrow Wind Turbine	1989	Germany	Wustrow, Mecklenburg–Western Pomerania	41 m	135 ft	First industrial wind turbine in former GDR, Vestas V25-200 kW wind turbine with 28.5 m tall tower and rotor diameter of 25 m

=== Chimneys/Smokestacks ===
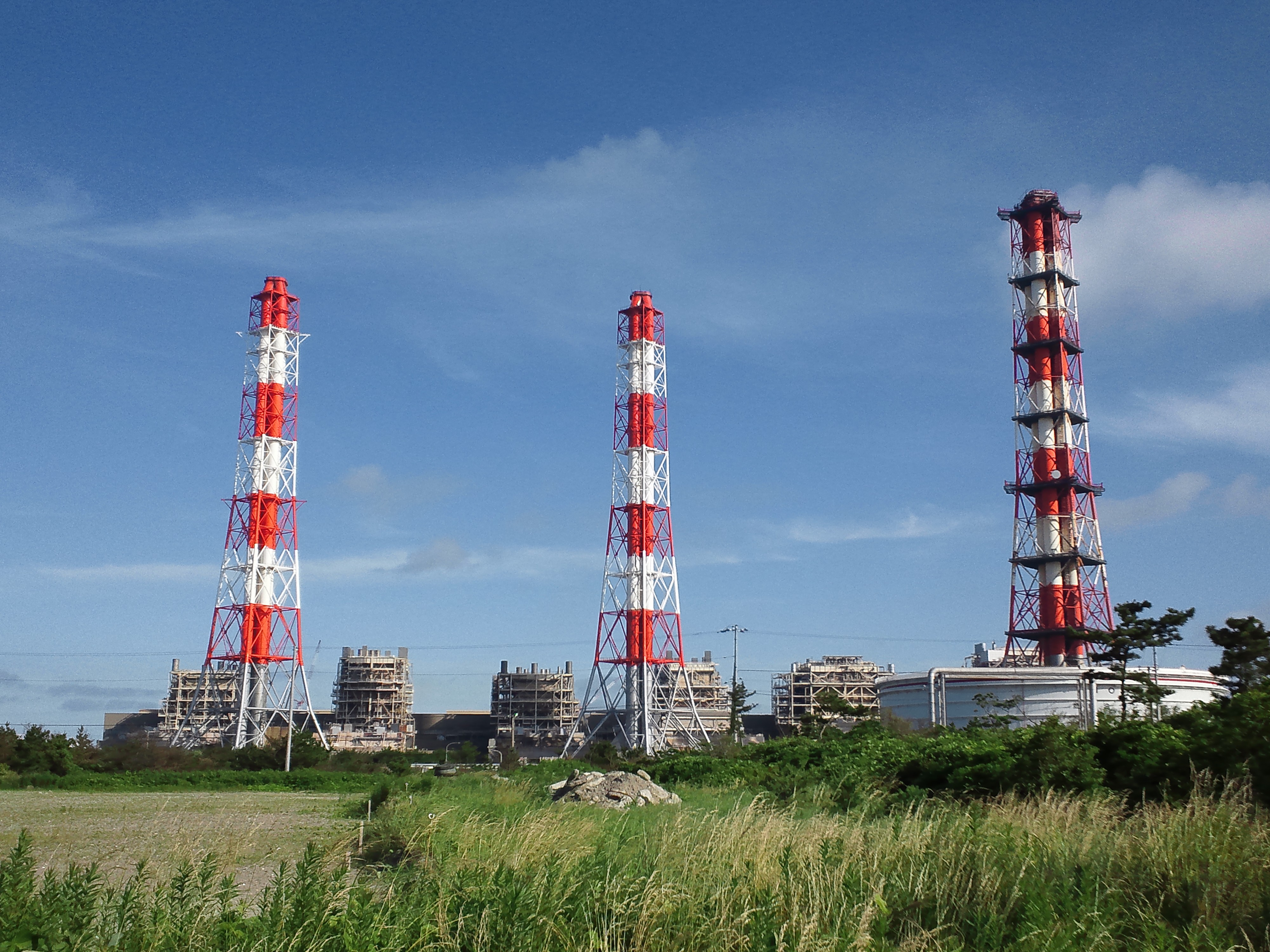
Three lattice stacks located at the Kashima Power Station

The majority of tall lattice chimneys in the world are located in Japan. Unlike other modern developed countries which use reinforced concrete to build tall chimneys Japan has historically used steel until recently for chimney construction.

List of lattice stacks above 150 m/492 ft in height.
indicates a structure that is no longer standing.

Tower	Year	Country	Town	Height m	Height ft	Remarks
Kashima Power Station, stack 1	1971	Japan	Kashima	231 m	758 ft	35°52′47″N 140°41′22″E
Hitachinaka Power Plant Chimney	2003	Japan	Hitachinaka	230 m	754 ft	Hyperboloid structure
Schilling Power Plant Chimney	1962	Germany	Stade	220 m	722 ft	Demolished in 2005
Fina Antwerp Olefins Flare 1		Belgium	Antwerp	211 m	694 ft	
Fina Antwerp Olefins Flare 2		Belgium	Antwerp	205 m	673 ft	
Fina Antwerp Olefins Flare 3		Belgium	Antwerp	204 m	669 ft	
Kashima Kyodo power station		Japan	Kashima	203 m	665 ft	35°56′31″N 140°41′19″E
JFE East Japan Works, stack 1		Japan	Chiba	201 m	660 ft	35°34′21″N 140°5′12″E
Anegasaki Power Station, stack 1		Japan	Anegasaki	200 m	656 ft	35°29′06″N 140°01′00″E
Anegasaki Power Station, stack 2		Japan	Anegasaki	200 m	656 ft	35°29′06″N 140°01′00″E
Anegasaki Power Station, stack 3		Japan	Anegasaki	200 m	656 ft	35°29′06″N 140°01′00″E
West Japan Iron and Steel Works, JFE Steel Corporation		Japan	Fukuyama	200 m	656 ft	No. 5 Sintering Plant
Futtsu Power Station, stack 1		Japan	Futtsu	200 m	656 ft	
Futtsu Power Station, stack 2		Japan	Futtsu	200 m	656 ft	
Kansaidenryokuhimeji Daini Power Station		Japan	Himeji	200 m	656 ft	34°46′19″N 134°41′38″E
Kansaidenryokuhimeji Daiichi Power Station		Japan	Himeji	200 m	656 ft	34°46′21″N 134°39′57″E
Kashima Power Station, stack 2	1971	Japan	Kashima	200 m	656 ft	35°52′47″N 140°41′22″E
Kashima Power Station, stack 3	1971	Japan	Kashima	200 m	656 ft	35°52′47″N 140°41′22″E
Hikari Area Yamaguchi Works		Japan	Kashima	200 m	656 ft	35°55′34″N 140°40′40″E
Kimitsu Steel Works		Japan	Kimitsu	200 m	656 ft	
Kyushudenryoku Shinkokura Power Station		Japan	Kitakyushu	200 m	656 ft	
Tobata Co-operative Thermal Power Co., Ltd.		Japan	Kitakyushu	200 m	656 ft	
Nippon Steel Nagoya Works		Japan	Nagoya	200 m	656 ft	35°2′22″N 136°52′27″E
Kansai Denryoku Kanagawa Power Station		Japan	Sennan	200 m	656 ft	34°19′24″N 135°7′48″E
Sodegaura Power Station, stack 1		Japan	Sodegaura	200 m	656 ft	
Sodegaura Power Station, stack 2		Japan	Sodegaura	200 m	656 ft	
Stadtwerketurm	1967	Germany	Duisburg	200 m	656 ft	Lattice section is only the upper 135 m / 443 ft, partially dismantled and no longer in use
Sinter Plant (Nippon Steel Sumitomo Metal Corp)		Japan	Kitakyushu	198 m	649 ft	33°55′30″N 130°51′3″E
JFE East Japan Works, stack 2		Japan	Chiba	190 m	630 ft	35°34′33″N 140°5′57″E
JFE East Japan Works, stack 3		Japan	Chiba	189 m	628 ft	35°34′17″N 140°5′16″E
Nippon Steel Co., Ltd. Kyushu Works Steelmaking Department		Japan	Kitakyushu	189 m	620 ft	
Fina Antwerp Olefins Flare 4		Belgium	Antwerp	185 m	607 ft	
Chiba Refinery and Petrochemical Plant, stack 1		Japan	Ichihara	183 m	599 ft	35°29′5″N 140°2′2″E
Yokkaichi Kombinato petrochemical processing facilities		Japan	Yokkaichi	182 m	598 ft	34°59′0″N 136°39′23″E
TEPCO Goikaryoku Fuel & Power Station, stack 1		Japan	Goikaryoku	181 m	593 ft	35°32′49″N 140°4′11″E
Sulfuric Acid Workshop Chimney	1980	Ukraine	Konstantinovka	180 m	592 ft	demolished in 2018
1st Chimney of SK-46	1984	Ukraine	Zhovti Vody	180 m	591 ft	demolished in 2015
2nd Chimney of SK-46	1987	Ukraine	Zhovti Vody	180 m	591 ft	
Nippon Steel Co., Ltd. Kyushu Works Steelmaking Department		Japan	Kitakyushu	180 m	591 ft	
Kashima Iron Works power station		Japan	Kashima	180 m	591 ft	35.947067°N 140.688737°E
Kainan (Hainan) Thermal Power Plant, stack 1		Japan	Kainan	180 m	590 ft	
Kainan (Hainan) Thermal Power Plant, stack 2		Japan	Kainan	180 m	590 ft	
Sakaiko Power Station, stack 1		Japan	Osaka	180 m	590 ft	34°34′8″N 135°26′27″E
Sakaiko Power Station, stack 2		Japan	Osaka	180 m	590 ft	34°34′8″N 135°26′27″E
Dengan Kaihatsu Takasago Karyoku Power Station		Japan	Takasago	180 m	590 ft	34°35′13″N 134°45′55″E
Yokosuka Thermal Power Station, stack 1		Japan	Yokosuka City	180 m	591 ft	Demolished in 2020
Yokosuka Thermal Power Station, stack 2		Japan	Yokosuka City	180 m	591 ft	Demolished in 2021
Yokosuka Thermal Power Station, stack 3		Japan	Yokosuka City	180 m	591 ft	Demolished in 2021
Onahama Smelting Co., Ltd		Japan	Onahama	170 m	559 ft	36°56′37″N 140°52′53″E
West Japan Iron and Steel Works, JFE Steel Corporation		Japan	Fukuyama	166 m	545 ft	
Chimney of UkrZinc		Ukraine	Konstantinovka	165 m	541 ft	demolished
Kimitsu Steel Works		Japan	Kimitsu	162 m	531 ft	
Osaka Refinery, stack 1		Japan	Osaka	162 m	530 ft	34°31′57″N 135°24′44″E
Osaka Refinery, stack 2		Japan	Osaka	162 m	530 ft	34°31′59″N 135°24′32″E
Nitric Acid Shop Chimney		Ukraine	Siverodonetsk	155 m	509 ft	
JFE East Japan Works, stack 4		Japan	Chiba	151 m	495 ft	35°34′41″N 140°5′36″E
Yutaka Chemical Mizushima Plant		Japan	Kurashiki	151 m	495 ft	34°30′52″N 133°43′40″E
Legnica Copper Smelter		Poland	Legnica	150 m	493 ft	
RK Saltivska Chimney	1969	Ukraine	Kharkiv	150 m	492 ft	
Weak Nitric Acid Shop of Severodonetsk		Ukraine	Siverodonetsk	150 m	492 ft	
West Japan Iron and Steel Works, JFE Steel Corporation		Japan	Fukuyama	150 m	492 ft	No. 4 Sintering Plant
Setouchi Joint Thermal Power Co., Ltd.		Japan	Fukuyama	150 m	492 ft	
TEPCO Goikaryoku Fuel & Power Station, stack 2		Japan	Goikaryoku	150 m	492 ft	35°32′54″N 140°4′21″E
COSMO Oil refinery		Japan	Goikaryoku	150 m	492 ft	35°32′31″N 140°4′34″E
Chiba Refinery, Kyokuto Petroleum or JXTG Nippon Oil & Energy Corporation, stack 1		Japan	Ichihara	150 m	492 ft	35°30′58″N 140°2′48″E
Chiba Refinery, Kyokuto Petroleum or JXTG Nippon Oil & Energy Corporation, stack 2		Japan	Ichihara	150 m	492 ft	35°30′59″N 140°2′58″E
Chiba Refinery and Petrochemical Plant, stack 2		Japan	Ichihara	150 m	492 ft	35°29′11″N 140°2′11″E
Sakaiko Power Station, stack 3		Japan	Osaka	150 m	492 ft	34°34′8″N 135°26′27″E
Sakaiko Power Station, stack 4		Japan	Osaka	150 m	492 ft	34°34′8″N 135°26′27″E
Sakaiko Power Station, stack 5		Japan	Osaka	150 m	492 ft	34°34′8″N 135°26′27″E
Sakaiko Power Station, stack 6		Japan	Osaka	150 m	492 ft	34°34′8″N 135°26′27″E
Flarestick 4 of PKN Orlen	2009	Poland	Plock	147 m	481 ft	

=== Oil platforms ===
List of oil platforms with a steel jacket above 300 m / 1000 ft in height.

Name	Year	Built in	Current location	Height m	Height ft	Type	Remarks
Petronius Compliant Tower	2000	United States	Gulf of Mexico	640	2,100	Compliant tower	Tallest freestanding structure in the world 2000–2008
Baldpate Compliant Tower	1998	United States	Gulf of Mexico	581.5	1,908	Compliant tower	Tallest freestanding structure in the world 1998–2000
Bullwinkle Platform	1989	United States	Gulf of Mexico	529	1,736	Truss tower	Tallest fixed/rigged freestanding structure built in water
Benguela-Belize Lobito-Tomboco Platform	2008	United States	Congo basin	512	1,680	Compliant tower	
Pompano Platform	1994	United States	Gulf of Mexico	477	1,565	Truss tower	
Tombua Landana platform	2009	United States	Congo basin	474	1,554	Compliant tower	
Coelacanth Platform	2016	United States	Gulf of Mexico	400	1,312	Truss tower	
Cognac Platform	1977	United States	Gulf of Mexico	385.5	1,265	Fixed truss tower	
Harmony Platform	1992	South Korea	California	366	1,200	Fixed truss tower	height is only to water level likely to be as taller than the Cognac Platform
Hondo Platform	1976	United States	Gulf of Mexico	354.5	1,163	Truss tower	
Virgo Platform	1999	United States	Gulf of Mexico	344	1,130	Truss tower	height is only to water level likely to be as taller than the Cognac Platform
Cerveza Platform	1981	United States	Gulf of Mexico	327	1,073	Truss tower	
Cerveza Light Platform	1981	United States	Gulf of Mexico	327	1,073	Truss tower	
Heritage Platform	1992	South Korea	California	326	1,070	Truss tower	height is only to water level likely to be as taller than the Cognac Platform
Amberjack Platform	1991	United States	Gulf of Mexico	314	1,030	Truss tower	height is only to water level likely to be as taller than the Cognac Platform

=== Jackup rigs ===
List of jackup rigs above 150 m (490 ft) in height.

Name	Year	Country	Height m	Height ft	Remarks
Noble Lloyd Noble			214 m	702 ft	
XL Enhanced (XLE), Ultra Harsh Environment jackup	2016		206.8 m	678 ft	4 vessels
Cat J super-rigs			198 m	650 ft	

=== Pillars of aerial tramways ===
Tramway	Year	Country	Town	Height m	Height ft	Remarks
New Eibsee Aerial Tramway Pylon	2017	Germany	Grainau	127.1 m	417 ft	
Glacial Aerial Tramway Kaprun III	1966	Austria	Kaprun	113.6 m	372 ft	
Torre Jaume I	1931	Spain	Barcelona	107 m	351 ft	Intermediate stop, also observation tower
Gant Hohtaelli Aerial Tramway	?	Switzerland	Zermatt	94 m	308 ft	
Old Eibsee Aerial Tramway pylon 1	1962	Germany	Garmisch-Partenkirchen	85 m	279 ft	Demolished in 2017 and replaced by a taller single pylon
3S Aerial Tramway	2004	Austria	Kitzbühel	80 m	262 ft	
Torre Sant Sebastia	1931	Spain	Barcelona	78 m	256 ft	Terminal of harbour aerial tramway of Barcelona Spain
Wendelstein Aerial Tramway	1970	Germany	Bischofsmais	75 m	246 ft	
Sandia Peak Tramway	1965	United States	Albuquerque	70.7 m	232 ft	inclined in an angle of 18 degree
Old Eibsee Aerial Tramway pylon 2	1962	Germany	Garmisch-Partenkirchen	65 m	213 ft	Demolished in 2017 and replaced by a taller single pylon

=== Rides ===
List of amusement park rides that make use of a steel lattice tower above 100 m / 328 ft in height.

Tower	Year	Country	Town	Theme Park	Height m	Height ft	Manufacturer
Kingda Ka & Zumanjaro: Drop of Doom	2005	United States	Jackson, New Jersey	Six Flags Great Adventure	139 m	456 ft	Intamin
Top Thrill Dragster	2003	United States	Sandusky, Ohio	Cedar Point	128 m	420 ft	Intamin
Superman: Escape from Krypton	1997	United States	Santa Clarita, California	Six Flags Magic Mountain	126.5 m	415 ft	Intamin
Texas SkyScreamer	2013	United States	Arlington, Texas	Six Flags Over Texas	122 m	400 ft	Funtime
Eclipse	2013	Sweden	Stockholm	Gröna Lund	121.9 m	400 ft	Funtime
Highlander	2019	Germany	Sierksdorf	Hansa-Park	120 m	394 ft	Funtime
La Venganza del Enigma		Spain	Madrid	Parque Warner Madrid	115 m	377 ft	S&S Worldwide
Red Force	2017	Spain	Catalonia	Ferrari Land	112 m	367 ft	Intamin
Donjon de l'Extrême		France	Dolancourt	Nigloland	105 m	345 ft	Funtime

=== Monuments ===
Tower	Year	Country	Town	Height m	Height ft	Remarks
Trylon and Perisphere	1939	United States	New York City	186 m	610 ft	Monument built for the 1939 New York World's Fair, demolished in 1941
Ring of Life	2012	China	Fushun	157 m	515 ft	
Torre del Reformador	1935	Guatemala	Guatemala City	75 m	246 ft	
Gate Tower Clio	1990	Netherlands	Groningen	43 m	141 ft	
Shall we Dance	2007	Netherlands	Doetinchem	37 m	121 ft	
Zauberlehrling	2013	Germany	Oberhausen	35 m	115 ft	
Mount Gorbea summit cross	1907	Spain	Mount Gorbea	17.2 m	89 ft	

=== Lighthouses ===
Tower	Year	Country	Town	meters	feet
Recalada a Bahía Blanca Light	1906	Argentina	Monte Hermoso	67	220
Campen Lighthouse	1889	Germany	Krummhörn	65.3	214
Adziogol Lighthouse	1911	Ukraine	Rybalche	64	211
Carysfort Reef Light	1852	United States	Key Largo, Florida	36.6	120

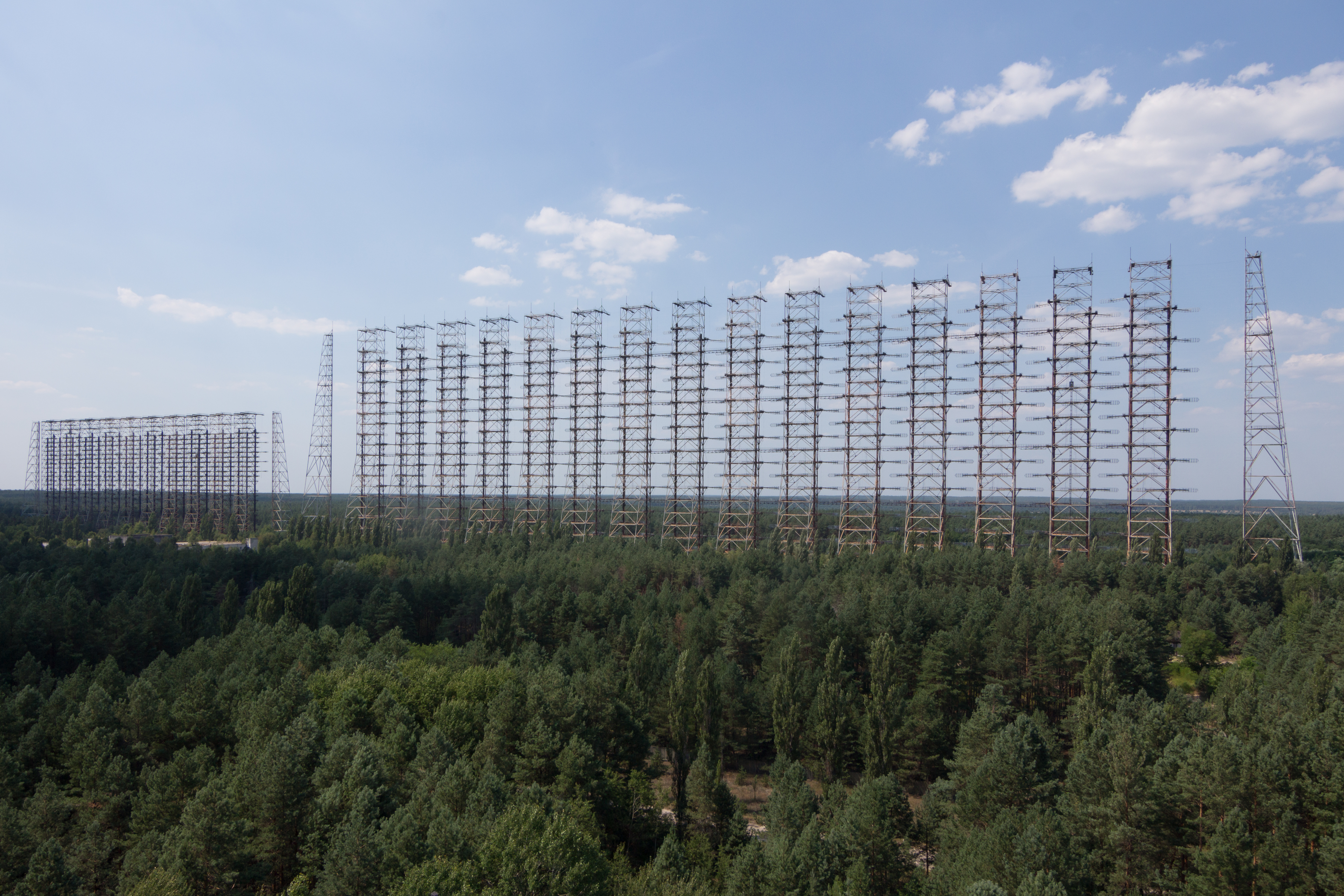
The Duga radar array

=== Other uses ===
Tower	Year	Country	Town	Height m	Height ft	Remarks
Sky Ride, East tower	1933	United States	Chicago	191 m	628 ft	attraction built for the 1933 World's Fair, demolished on Aug 29 1935
Sky Ride, West tower	1933	United States	Chicago	191 m	628 ft	demolished in 1933
George Washington Bridge, East tower	1931	United States	New York	184 m	604 ft	
George Washington Bridge, West tower	1931	United States	New York	184 m	604 ft	
Meteorological Towers of Høvsøre Wind Turbine Test Centre, Tower 1	2004	Denmark	Bøvlingbjerg	165 m	541 ft	used for wind measurements (a measurement tower)
Meteorological Towers of Høvsøre Wind Turbine Test Centre, Tower 2	2004	Denmark	Bøvlingbjerg	165 m	541 ft	used for wind measurements
Arts Centre Melbourne	1996	Australia	Melbourne	162 m	532 ft	performing arts centre, rebuilt, height includes building structure at base, original lattice tower completed in 1981 was 115m
Panmunjom Flagpole	2009	North Korea	Peace Village	160 m	525 ft	Flagpole
Duga radar	1976	Ukraine	Chernihiv	150 m	492 ft	Over-the-horizon radar, comprising 17 towers
Khan Shatyr Entertainment Center	2010	Kazakhstan	Nur-Sultan	150 m	492 f	Entertainment Center, glass dome structurally supported by an internal 3-legged lattice structure
Ivanpah Solar Power Facility, tower 1	2014	United States	California	139.9 m	459 ft	Solar power tower
Ivanpah Solar Power Facility, tower 2	2014	United States	California	139.9 m	459 ft	Solar power tower
Ivanpah Solar Power Facility, tower 3	2014	United States	California	139.9 m	459 ft	Solar power tower
Zeitzeichensender Pragins I	1931	Switzerland	Prangins	125 m	410 ft	used to broadcast Time Signal
Zeitzeichensender Pragins II	1931	Switzerland	Prangins	125 m	410 ft	used to broadcast Time Signal
Oak Ridge DOE Reservation Water Tower		United States	Tennessee	111 m	365 ft	Water tank, demolished August 3, 2013 possibly the tallest traditional steel water tower built
Rattling Brook Power Plant Surge Tank	1958	Canada	Jackson's Arm	94.75 m	311 ft	Surge tank, tallest steel plate structure in the world when built
Canadian Nuclear Laboratories Water Tower		Canada	Chalk River	91.5 m	300 ft	Water tank, demolished June 3, 2017
John Hart Dam Surge Tank 1	1947	Canada	Vancouver Island	90 m	295 ft	Surge tank
John Hart Dam Surge Tank 2	1947	Canada	Vancouver Island	90 m	295 ft	Surge tank, demolished July 25, 2019
John Hart Dam Surge Tank 3	1947	Canada	Vancouver Island	90 m	295 ft	Surge tank, demolished July 12, 2019
Parachute Tower Katowice	1937	Poland	Katowice	75 m	246 ft	Parachute tower
Eindhoven Water Towers	1970	Netherlands	Eindhoven	43 m	142 ft	Water tower

== Wooden lattice towers ==
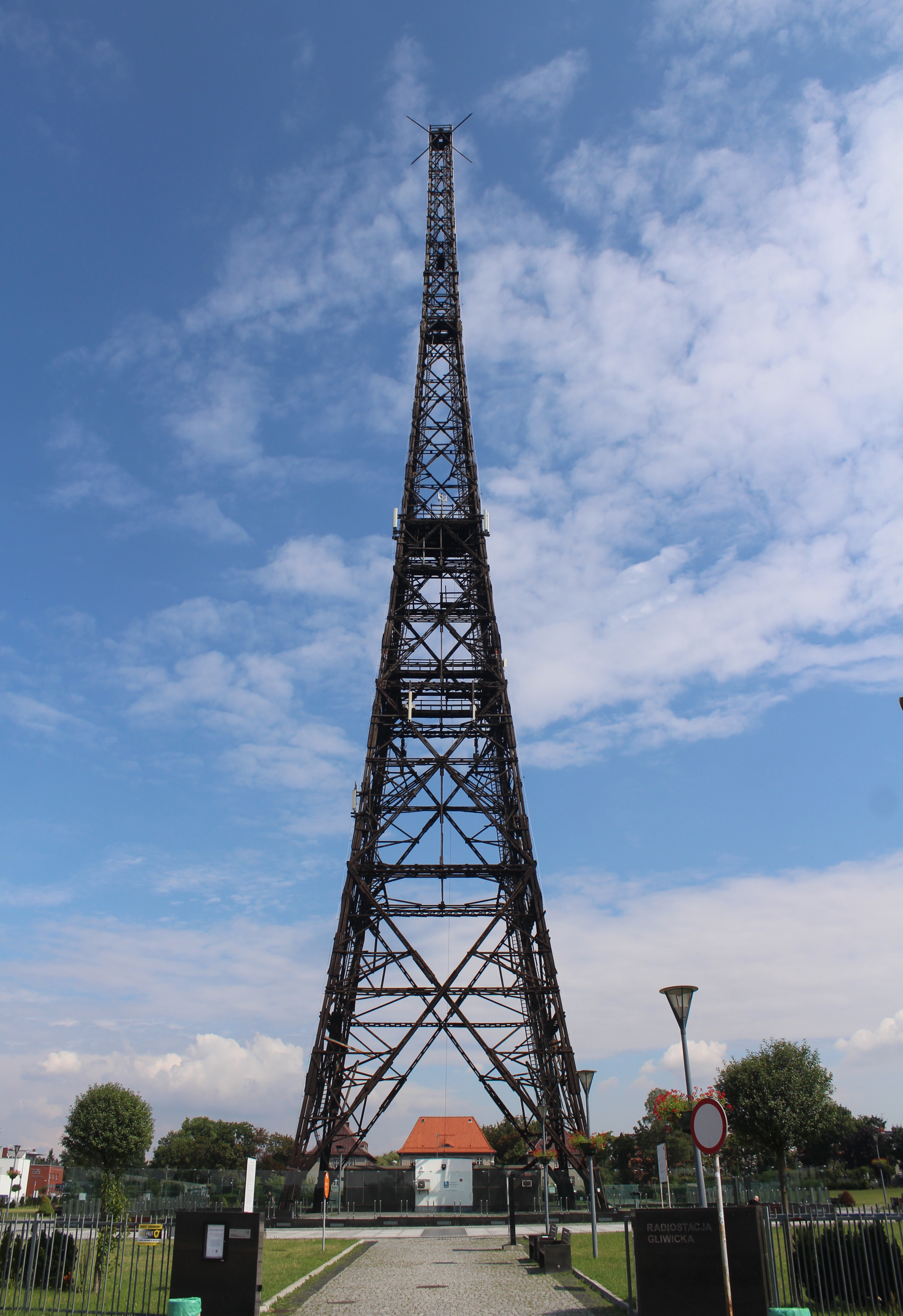
Radio Tower Gliwice is the tallest wooden lattice tower in the world.

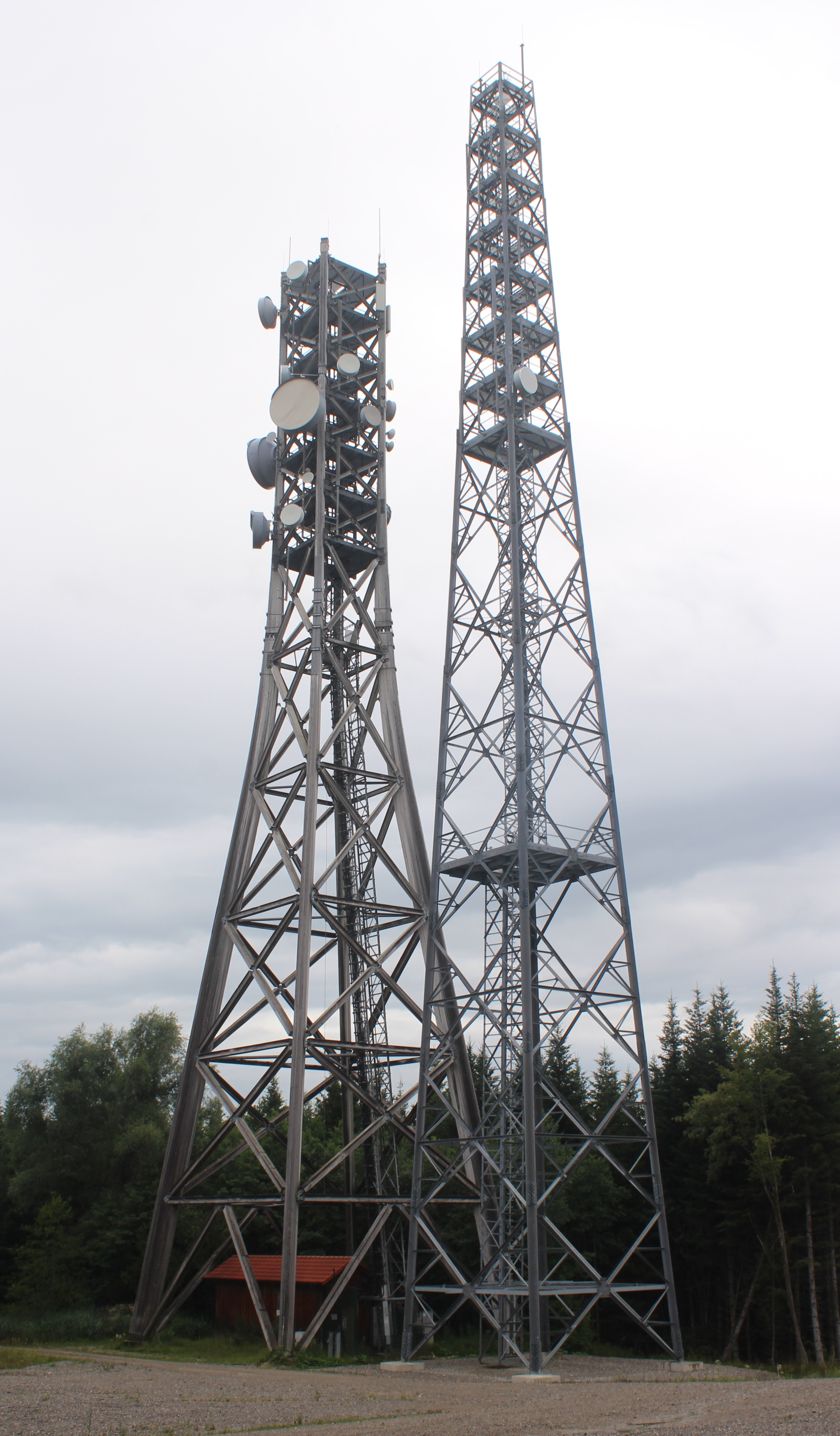
Comparision of a wooden lattice tower (left) and a steel lattice tower (right) of similar height for the same use

=== Existing towers ===
Tower	Year	Country	Town	Pinnacle height	Remarks
Radio Tower Gliwice	1935	Poland	Gliwice	118 m	Museum on Radio History and Visual Arts
Randsburg Wash Target Test Towers	1951	United States	Naval Air Weapons Station China Lake	109.73 m	Two towers, used for hanging up targets for guided missiles
Tour du Millénaire	2001	Belgium	Gedinne	60 m	interesting design
Himmelsglück Observation Tower	2021	Germany	Schömberg	55 m	observation tower
Aerial test facility Brück	1963	Germany	Brück	54 m	Two towers of different design
Torre de Herveo	1922	Colombia	Manizales	52 m	former support structure of aerial tramway
Observation Tower Blumenthal	2004	Germany	Blumenthal	45 m	observation tower
Copenhagen Zoo Tower	1905	Denmark	Copenhagen	43.5	observation tower
Chuderhüsi Tower	2001	Switzerland	Röthenbach	42 m	observation tower
Teltschik Tower	2001	Germany	Wilhelmsfeld	41 m	observation tower
Veitsch Mount of Olives Pilgrims Cross	2004	Austria	Veitsch	40.6 m	observation tower
Surány One Cellphone Transmission Tower		Hungary	Pócsmegyer	40 m	
Ácsteszér Cellphone Transmission Tower 1		Hungary	Ácsteszér	40 m	
Wil Tower	2006	Switzerland	Wil	38 m	observation tower
Raiffeisen Observation Tower	1990	Germany	Aldorf	35 m	observation tower
Oberpfalz Tower	2000	Germany	Platte	35 m	observation tower
Loorenkopf Observation Tower	1954	Switzerland	Zurich	33 m	observation tower
Ossinger Tower	2013	Germany	Ossinger mountain	32 m	observation tower
Eugen-Keidel Tower	1981	Germany	Schauinsland mountain	31 m	observation tower
Tóthfalu One Cellphone Transmission Tower		Hungary	Tahitótfalu	30.5 m	
Atzelberg Tower	1980	Germany	Kelkheim	30.39 m	observation tower
Fire observation Tower Rennbeck	?	Germany	Oer	30 m	fire observation tower
Idarkopf Tower	1980	Germany	Idarkopf	28 m	observation tower
Hohenmirsberg Observation Tower	2008	Germany	Pottenstein	28 m	observation tower
Höhbeck Observation Tower	2008	Germany	Höhbeck	26 m	observation tower
Loth Tower	2003	Switzerland	Magglingen	25 m	observation tower
Salzkopfturm	1975	Germany	Salzkopf	24 m	observation tower
Observation Tower Burgstall	2000	Austria	Kirchberg/Donau	24 m	observation tower
Krawutschke Tower	1972	Germany	Burgberg	13 m	observation tower

=== Destroyed Wooden lattice towers ===
Tower	Year	Country	Town	Pinnacle height	Date of demolition	Remarks
Transmission Tower Mühlacker	1934	Germany	Mühlacker	190 m	April 6, 1945	
Transmitter Berlin-Tegel	1933	Germany	Berlin	165 m	December 16, 1948	
Sendeturm Ismaning	1932	Germany	Ismaning	163 m	March 16, 1983	
Sendeturm Langenberg	1934	Germany	Velbert-Langenberg	160 m	October 10, 1935	destroyed by a tornado
Sendeturm Wiederau	1935	Germany	Wiederau	150 m	October 27, 1953	
Sendeturm Hamburg-Billstedt	1934	Germany	Hamburg	145 m	September 1949	
Transmitter Żórawina	1932	Germany	Żórawina, Poland	140 m	Fall 1990	
Herstedvester Radio Tower	1933	Denmark	Albertslund	125 m	1975	
Transmitter Nuremberg-Kleinreuth	1935	Germany	Nuremberg	124 m	July 12, 1961	
Madona Radio Towers	1932	Latvia	Madona	116 m	1944	
Transmitter Heilsberg	1935	Germany	Lidzbark Warmiński, Poland	115 m	1940	
Freiburg-Lehen transmitter	1933	Germany	Freiburg	107 m	April 21, 1945	
Heiligenstock transmitter	1934	Germany	Frankfurt/Main	107 m	March 25, 1945	
Transmitter Koblenz	1934	Germany	Koblenz	107 m	1965	
Transmitter Trier	1935	Germany	Trier	107 m	1948	
Transmitter Heilsberg	1930	Germany	Lidzbark Warmiński, Poland	102 m	1935	Two towers
Reichenbach transmitter	1937	Germany	Reichenbach/Oberlausitz	100 m	May 7, 1945	
Golm transmitter	1948	Germany	Golm	100 m	October 25, 1979	
Latting Observatory	1853	United States	New York City	96 m	1856	Observation tower, destroyed by a fire
Stettin Radio Tower	1934	Poland	Szczecin	93 m	1945	
Utbremen Radio Tower	1933	Germany	Bremen	90 m	1939	destroyed by lightning
Flensburg Radio Tower	1928	Germany	Flensburg	90 m	1957	
Pillar of Mittersill goods aerial tramway	194?	Austria	Mittersill	80 m	195?	Aerial tramway support pillar of goods aerial tramway, which never went in service
Stadelheim Transmitter	1926	Germany	Munich-Stadelheim	75 m	1930s	Two towers
Chain Home Reception Towers	1939	UK	multiple locations	73.15 m	1945–1960	
Cricklade Radio Tower	1967	United Kingdom	Cricklade	73.15 m	January 26, 2000	
Rottenbuch Radio Tower	2002	Germany	Peiting	71 m	2026	Tower for directional radio and mobile phone services
Wood Transmitting Tower Zeesen	1931	Germany	Zeesen	70 m	1939	
Reception Tower Utlandshörn	1935	Germany	Utlandshörn	65 m	1977	
Towers of South Wellfleet Marconi Wireless Station	1902	United States	South Wellfleet, Massachusetts	64 m	1920	4 towers
Towers of Königsberg Air Traffic Control Centre	1926	Russia	Kaliningrad	63 m	1945	Two towers
Palatine Transmitter	1926	Germany	Kaiserslautern	60 m	1945	Two towers
Huizen transmitter	1937	Netherlands	Huizen	60 m	1940	
Central mast of Boguchwala transmitter	1953	Poland	Boguchwala	60 m	1957	
Holmudden Radar Tower	1948	Sweden	Holmudden	?	1958	
Wardenclyffe Tower	1899	United States	Shoreham	57 m	1917	
Wiesbaden Bismarck Tower	1910	Germany	Wiesbaden	50 m	1918	
Sahlenburg Marine Radio Station	1937	Germany	Cuxhaven	50 m	1967/1970	Three towers, two demolished in 1967, third tower demolished in 1970
Stolp transmitter	1938/1939	Poland	Dębnica Kaszubska	50 m	1955	7 towers
Jelenia Góra transmitter	1957	Poland	Jelenia Góra	47 m	1967	
Towers of triangle antenna Langenberg	1935	Germany	Velbert-Langenberg	45 m	April 12, 1945	Three towers
Goethe Tower	1931	Germany	Frankfurt-Sachsenhausen	43 m	October 12, 2017	Destroyed in a fire
Máriakálnok Cellphone Transmission Tower		Hungary	Máriakálnok	40 m	2023	
Kisbér Nokia Cellphone Transmission Tower	2002	Hungary	Kisbér	40 m	2015	Replaced by a steel tower
Bayreuth transmitter, T-antenna	194?	Germany	Bayreuth	40 m	1954	2 towers in a distance of 70 metres
Augsburg-Hochzoll transmitter	194?	Germany	Augsburg	40 m	1952	2 towers
Kempten-Engelshalde Transmitter	1951	Germany	Kempten	40 m	1956	Two towers
Heusweiler Mast 1	1935	Germany	Heusweiler	35 m	March 17, 1945	
Schneeberg Air Force Tower	1938	Germany	Bischofsgrün	35 m	1942	
Heusweiler Mast 2	1935	Germany	Heusweiler	31 m	March 17, 1945	
Balatonudvari Cellphone Transmission Tower 1		Hungary	Balatonudvari	25 m	2023	Replaced by a steel tower
Holzbergturm	2005	Germany	Malente	28 m	2017	observation tower

== Tallest lattice towers, by design type ==
List of the tallest lattice towers by common(min 5) design types.

design Type	total built	Name	Year	Built in	City/location	Height m	Height ft	Remarks
Compliant tower(Oil Platform)	5	Petronius Compliant Tower	2000	United States	Gulf of Mexico	640	2,100	tallest lattice tower of any type,
Additionally supported by a solid core, Concrete	unknown >10	Tokyo Skytree	2012	Japan	Sumida, Tokyo	634	2,080	tallest lattice tower of any type built on land
Self-supported steel truss of any type	unknown	Bullwinkle Platform	1989	United States	Gulf of Mexico	529	1,736	tallest fixed/rigged freestanding steel-only truss structure built on land or sea
Additionally supported by a solid core, Steel	unknown >10	Kyiv TV Tower	1973	Ukraine	Kyiv	385	1,263	
Hydro Pylons	thousands	Jintang and Cezi islands Overhead Powerline Tie, East & West towers	2019	China	Jintang Island	380	1,247	tallest pylons in the world
4-sided steel lattice tower(land-based)	thousands	Tokyo Tower	1957	Japan	Tokyo	333	1,093	
3-sided steel lattice tower	thousands	WITI TV Tower	1962	United States	Shorewood, Wisconsin	329.4	1,081	
Landmark tower	10	Star Tower	1991	United States	Cincinnati, Ohio	290.8 m	954 ft	
Hyperboloid structure	>10	Perm TV Tower	2016	Russia	Perm	275 m	902 ft	
Top guyed lattice tower, featuring a guyed upper section with four horizontal crossbars	5	Grodno TV Tower	1984	Belarus	Grodno	254 m	833 ft	tallest freestanding structure in Belarus
Annapolis type	40~	Lafayette transmitter, Towers 1-8	1918	France	Marcheprime	250 m	820 ft	demolished in 1944 & 1953
Non-tapering	unknown >100	Noble Lloyd Noble(Oil Platform)				214 m	702 ft	all lattice towers above this height use a tapering design
3803 KM design	83	Edineţ TV Tower & Rezeknes TV Tower	?	Latvia	Edineţ & Rezeknes	204 m	669 ft	
Wooden lattice tower	unknown >100	Transmission Tower Mühlacker	1934	Germany		190 m	623 ft	demolished in 1945, tallest structure ever built out of wood

Unique lattice tower designs. Minimum height of 120 m / 400 ft.
indicates a structure that is no longer standing.

=== Hyperboloid structures ===
Tower	Year	Country	Town	Height m	Height ft	Remarks
Perm TV tower	2016	Russia	Perm	275 m	902 ft	
Moscow Octod Tower	2006	Russia	Moscow	258 m	846 ft	Dismantling began in 2022, deconstruction remains uncompleted
Hitachinaka Power Plant Chimney	2003	Japan	Hitachinaka	230 m	754 ft	Lattice chimney
Orion Tower	2001	Russia	Samara	201 m	660 ft	
Radio Mast at Krupskoi Street	2003	Russia	Perm	180 m	591 ft	
Shukhov radio Tower	1922	Russia	Moscow	160 m	525 ft	
Pylons of Cádiz, west tower	1960	Spain	Cádiz	158 m	518 ft	Electrical pylons
Pylons of Cádiz, east tower	1960	Spain	Cádiz	158 m	518 ft	Electrical pylons
Shukhov tower on the Oka River, west tower	1929	Russia	Dzerzhinsk	128 m	420 ft	Electrical pylons
Shukhov tower on the Oka River, east tower	1929	Russia	Dzerzhinsk	128 m	420 ft	Electrical pylons, demolished in May 2005.
Gettysburg National Tower	1974	United States	Gettysburg, Pennsylvania	120 m	394 ft	demolished on July 3, 2000

=== Landmark towers ===
Tower	Year	Country	Town	Height m	Height ft	Remarks
Star Tower	1991	United States	Cincinnati, Ohio	291 m	954 ft	Tallest Landmark tower ever built, assembled by helicopter
Hughes Memorial Tower	1989	United States	Washington, DC	232 m	761 ft	Tallest structure in Washington DC
Yiye Avila Tower	1991	United States	Utuado, Puerto Rico	167 m	548 ft	Tallest freestanding structure in Puerto Rico. Collapsed during Hurricane Maria
WLLY Tower	1995	United States	Mangonia Park, Florida	158.2 m	519 ft	
Mesquite Tower	1990	United States	Mesquite, Texas	155.3 m	509.5 ft	
Cumulus Media Tower	<2002	United States	Shreveport, Louisiana	152 m	499 ft	
Tower at 3551 J.R. Lynch Street (Extension)	<1996	United States	Jackson, Mississippi	152 m	499 ft	
Telecourier Communications Tower	1989	United States	Bloomington, Illinois	152 m	418 ft	

=== Blaw-Knox towers ===
Tower	Year	Country	Town	Height m	Height ft	Remarks
Lakihegy Tower	1946	Hungary	Szigetszentmiklós-Lakihegy	314 m	1030 ft	The current tower is a rebuild of the original tower which was constructed in 1933 but destroyed at the end of World War II.
Liblice Blaw-Knox Radio Mast	1936	Czech Republic	Liblice	280.40 m	920 ft	demolished on October 17, 1972
WSM Tower	1932	United States	Nashville, Tennessee	246 m	808 ft	The first Blaw-Knox tower ever built, originally 267 m (874 ft) in height
WLW Tower	1934	United States	Cincinnati, Ohio	227 m	747 ft	Originally 253 m (831 ft) in height
Vakarel Blaw-Knox Radio Mast	1937	Bulgaria	Elin Pelin	215	705 ft	demolished on September 16, 2020
WBT Tower 1	1934	United States	Charlotte, North Carolina	130 m	426 ft	Three towers in total, one original, two reproductions from the original plans after the originals were destroyed by Hurricane Hugo in 1989.
WBT Tower 2	1989	United States	Charlotte, North Carolina	130 m	426 ft	
WBT Tower 3	1989	United States	Charlotte, North Carolina	130 m	426 ft	
WADO Tower	1934	United States	Carlstadt, New Jersey	129 m	424 ft	Demolished on October 17, 1999
LVRTC Riga Blaw Knox Radiator	1947	Latvia	Riga	125 m	410 ft	Demolished in 2010
WFEA Tower	1931	United States	Manchester, New Hampshire	121 m	396 ft	

=== Top guyed lattice towers ===
Tower	Year	Country	Town	Height m	Height ft	Remarks
Grodno TV Tower	1984	Belarus	Grodno	254 m	833 ft	Tallest freestanding structure in Belarus
Vitebsk TV Tower	1983	Belarus	Vitebsk	244 m	801 ft	
Astara TV Tower	1981	Republic of Azerbaijan	Astara	243.84 m	800 ft	
Wavre Transmitter	1983	Belgium	Wavre	232 m	761 ft	Tallest lattice tower in Belgium
Tour Dégueu	?	Belgium	Leglise-Anlier	151 m	495 ft	

== See also ==
- List of towers
- List of tallest towers
- List of tallest structures
- List of tallest freestanding steel structures
- List of tallest buildings and structures
- List of tallest oil platforms
- Additionally guyed tower
- Architectural structure
- Hyperboloid structure
- Partially guyed tower
