= WKRQ Tower =

WKRQ-FM Tower
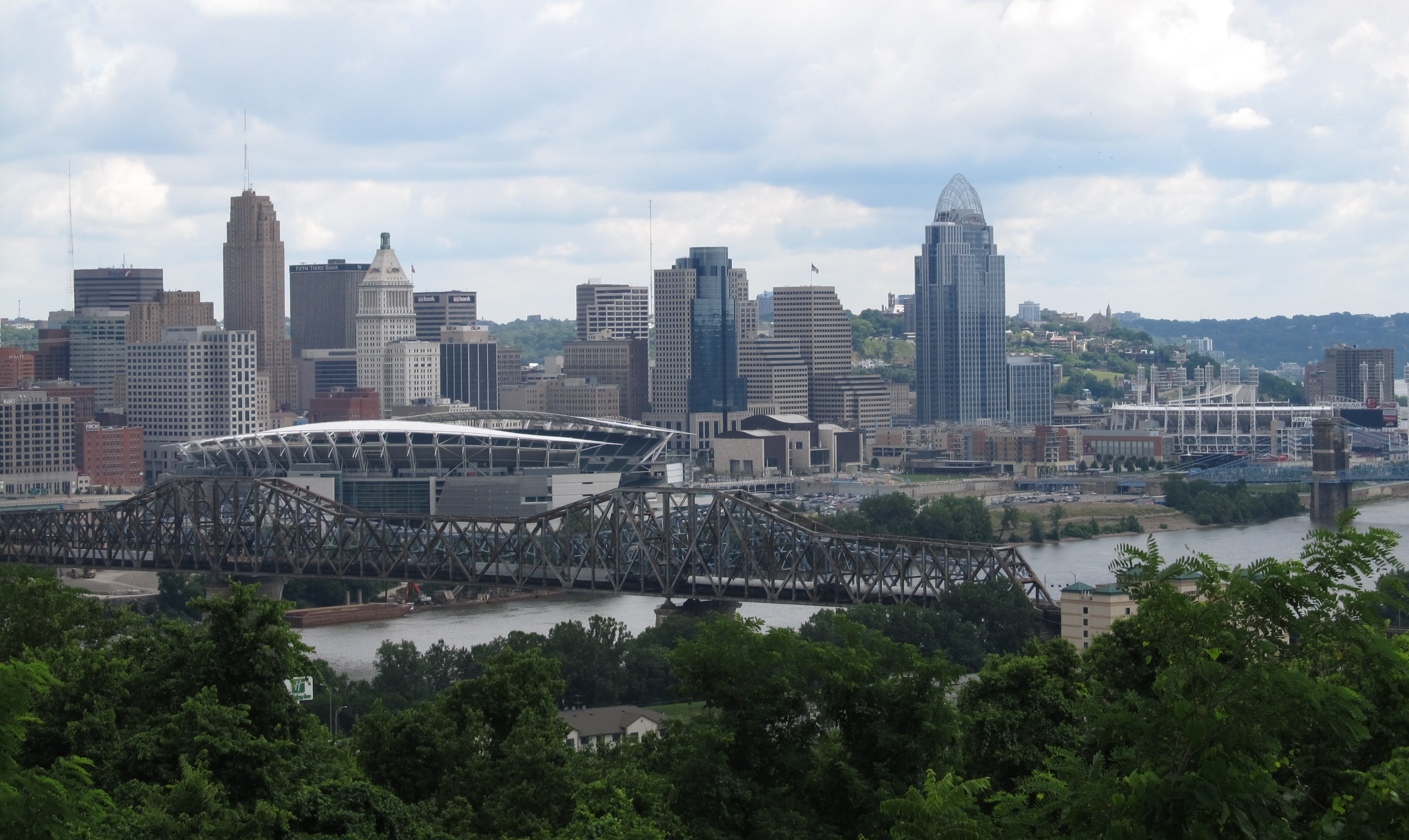
- The WKRQ Tower as seen in relation to the Cincinnati Skyline, it is the lattice tower on the left hand side of the image directly behind the Carew Tower. The lattice tower further to the left is the WCPO TV Tower

- Location within the United States

General information
- Status: Completed
- Type: Steel lattice television tower
- Location: Cincinnati, Ohio
- Coordinates: 39°06′59″N 84°30′07″W
- Completed: early 1960s

Height
- Height: 294.6 m (967 ft)

The WKRQ Tower is a free-standing lattice tower with triangular cross section used by WKRQ and WKRC-TV as well as several other radio stations located in Cincinnati, Ohio. The tower was built in the early 1960s a period when numerous tall free standing steel lattice towers were being built across the United States including the WCPO TV Tower, the Turner Broadcasting Tower, the WHDH-TV Tower and the WITI TV Tower. The tower stands 294.6 m (967 ft) tall and WKRC's nickname in the 1960s was "Tall 12", a reference to the station's tower which is the tallest in Cincinnati.

The WKRQ Tower remains the tallest freestanding structure in Cincinnati to this day and one of four that rise above 900 feet in the city.

== Stations ==
=== Radio ===
FM stations that transmit from the WKRQ Tower include the following:

Callsign	Frequency	Format	Owner
WOFX	92.5	Classic rock	Cumulus Media
WNNF	94.1	Country	Cumulus Media
W233BG	94.5		
W245AJ	96.9		
W264BW	100.7		
WKRQ	101.9	Top 40	Hubbard Broadcasting
W272BY	102.3		
WEBN	102.7	Mainstream rock	iHeartMedia
WKFS	107.1	Top 40	iHeartMedia

=== Television ===
TV stations that transmit from WKRQ Tower include the following:

Callsign	Virtual Channel	Physical Channel	Affiliation	Digital channels
WKRC-TV	12	12	CBS	12

== See also ==
- Lattice tower
- List of tallest freestanding steel structures
