= WKRC =

WKRC may refer to:

- WKRC (AM), a radio station (550 AM) licensed to Cincinnati, Ohio, United States
- WKRC-TV, a television station (channel 12) licensed to Cincinnati, Ohio, United States
