= Turner Broadcasting tower =

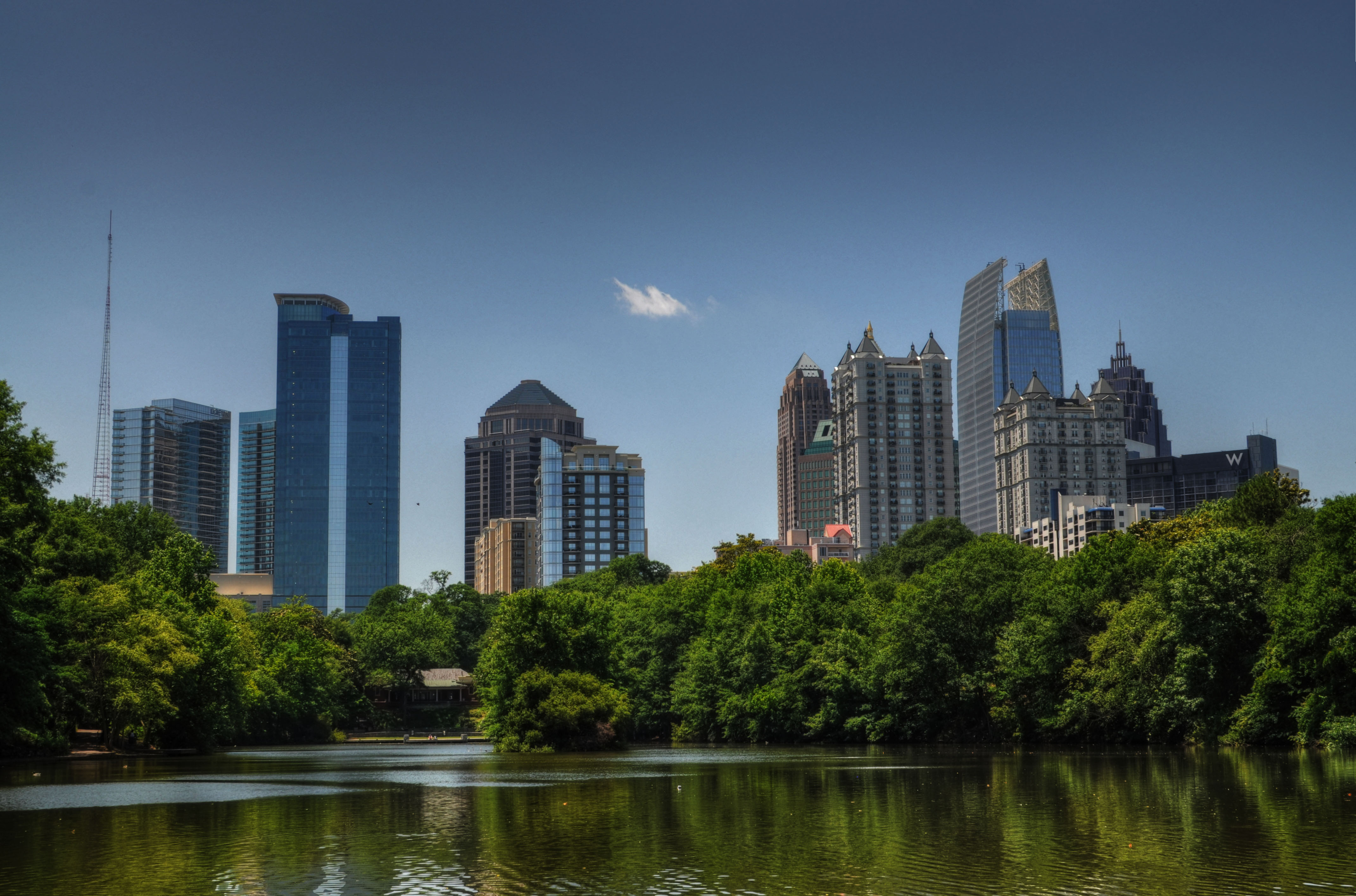

- Location within the United States

General information
- Status: Completed
- Type: Steel lattice television tower
- Location: Atlanta, Georgia
- Coordinates: 33.7825°N 84.388611°W
- Completed: 1967
- Destroyed: 2010

Height
- Height: 314.3 m (1,031 ft)

The Turner Broadcasting tower was a 314.3-meter (1,031 ft) free-standing lattice tower in Atlanta, Georgia. It was located next to the Downtown Connector between Spring, West Peachtree, 10th and 12th Streets in Midtown. The tower had a triangular cross-section and was built on the site of a previous four-sided broadcast tower built for WAGA-TV 5 and to serve WJRJ-TV which was founded by Rice Broadcasting Inc. which was owned by a local Atlanta entrepreneur, Jack M. Rice, Jr. It was the tallest freestanding structure to ever be voluntarily removed in the United States until the demolition of the tallest Chimney at the Homer City Generating Station in 2025.

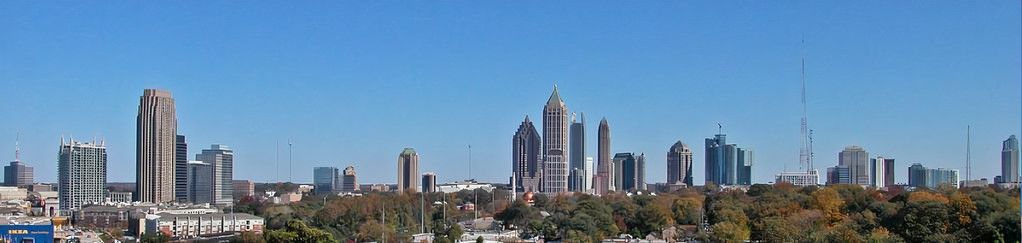
Turner Broadcast Tower in the Midtown skyline

== History ==
At the time of its completion it was one of the ten tallest freestanding structure in the world behind only the Ostankino Tower, Empire State Building, Tokyo Tower, WITI TV Tower, Eiffel Tower, WHDH-TV tower, Chrysler Building and the KCTV Broadcast Tower. The construction of tower was financed by GE, which also provided the original channel 17 transmitter. The tower was completed in 1967 and the first broadcast from the tower came on September 1, 1967, under the WJRJ-TV call letters, operating on UHF channel 17. The towers height gave Channel 17 a strong signal boost which greatly helped UHF broadcasts as this era featured low-sensitivity tuners and lousy antennas.

In July 1969, Rice Broadcasting reached an agreement to merge with the Turner Communications Corporation and the tower was formally named the Turner Broadcasting tower thereafter. Although the tower was owned by Turner Broadcasting System parent Time Warner, it was on a land lease from Comcast, a competing cable TV company. This is the result of WAGA having been owned by Storer Broadcasting, while Storer Cable went through a series of acquisitions that found it folded into Comcast. Storer leased the land to WJRJ, which later became WTCG when purchased by Ted Turner, and was best known as "superstation" WTBS (now TBS on cable/satellite and Peachtree TV over-the-air). Turner later sold his TV networks (including CNN, TBS, and others) and the TV station to Time Warner.

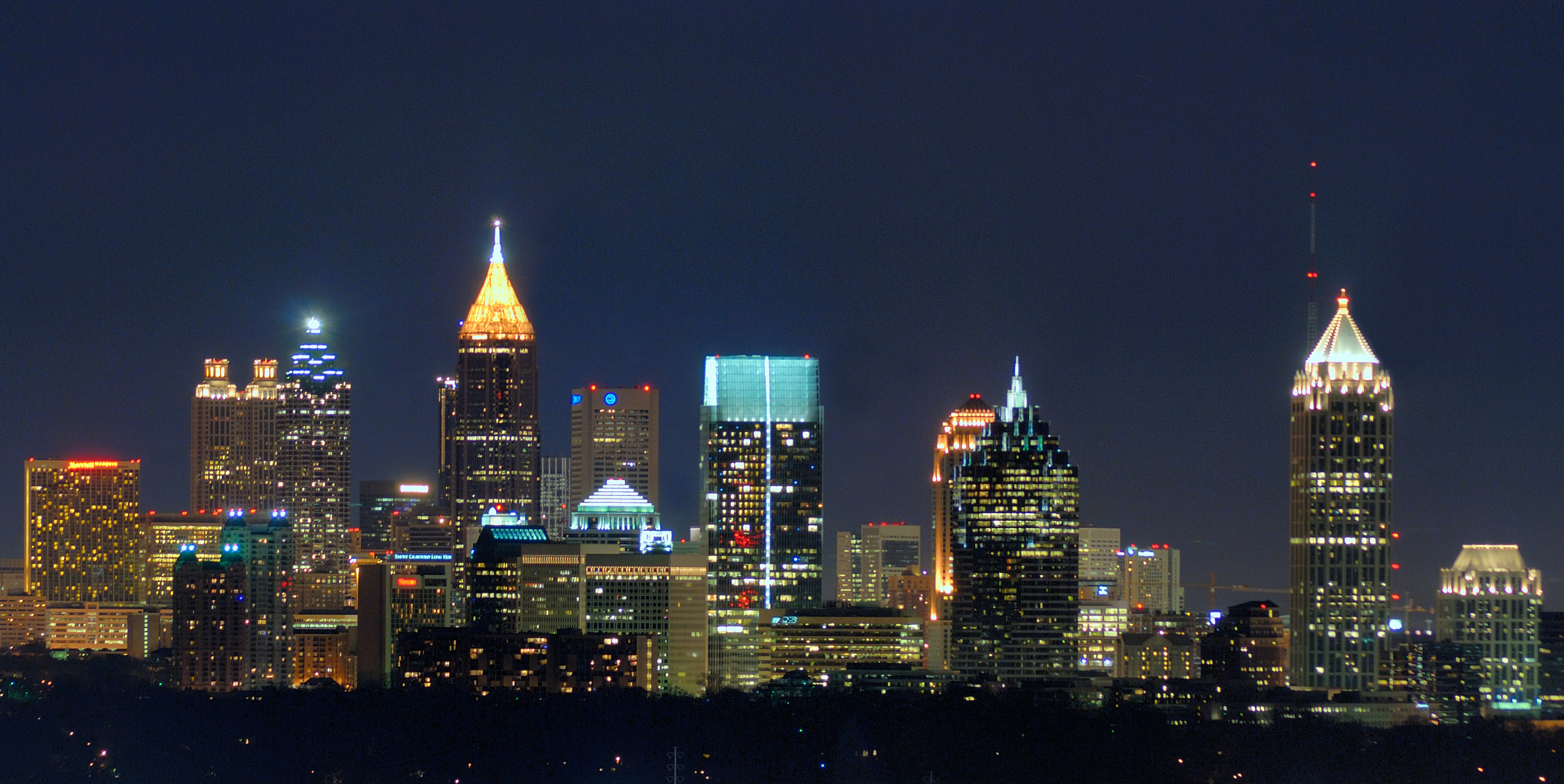
The Turner Broadcast Tower was 8 feet taller than the Bank of America Plaza, Atlanta's tallest building

== Dismantling ==
The tower was disassembled in late 2010, with analog WPCH-TV 17 having been discontinued by, and tenants WNNX FM 100.5 and WWWQ FM 99.7 moving their auxiliary/backup facilities elsewhere. The lease apparently was on the condition that the tower be removed when it would no longer be used for broadcasting, a condition which was finally triggered by the mandated shutdown of analog TV law in June 2009. The digital TV transmission for WPCH-TV 20 (17.1) is now from the North Druid Hills site, along with several other local FM and TV stations, including WWWQ FM 99.7. WNNX FM 100.5 is now back at the Westin Peachtree Plaza Hotel, where it was first located after being moved-in from Alabama as WWWQ FM 100.5, before briefly moving to the Turner tower and back again.

The Turner Broadcasting tower remains one of the tallest towers of any type to be demolished and one of the tallest freestanding structures to ever be voluntarily removed in the USA.

== See also ==
- Lattice tower
- List of tallest freestanding structures
- List of tallest demolished freestanding structures
- List of tallest freestanding steel structures
