= WCPO TV Tower =

- Location within the United States

General information
- Status: Completed
- Type: Steel lattice television tower
- Location: Cincinnati, Ohio
- Coordinates: 39°07′30″N 84°29′56″W
- Completed: 1965

Height
- Height: 276 m (906 ft)

The WCPO TV Tower is a free-standing lattice tower with triangular cross section located in Cincinnati, Ohio, and used by WCPO-TV, WEBN, WUBE-FM, WVXU, WBQC-LD, and previously WOTH-CD. Built in 1965 it is the oldest of Cincinnati's large freestanding radio towers. The tower stands 276 m (906 ft) tall, one of four in the city that rise above 900 feet (270 m) in height and is amongst the tallest lattice towers in the world.

== Stations ==
=== Radio ===
FM stations that transmit from WCPO TV Tower include the following:

Callsign	Frequency	Format	Owner
WVXU	91.7	Talk radio	Cincinnati Public Radio
WUBE-FM	105.1	Country music	Hubbard Broadcasting

=== Television ===
TV stations that transmit from WCPO TV Tower include the following:

Callsign	Virtual Channel	Physical Channel	Affiliation	Digital channels
WCPO-TV	9	9	ABC	26
WBQC-LD	25	38	Cozi TV	28

== See also ==
- Lattice tower
- List of tallest freestanding steel structures
