= WCKY (AM) =

- Cincinnati, Ohio; United States
- Broadcast area: Cincinnati metropolitan area
- Frequency: 1530 kHz
- Branding: Cincinnati's ESPN 1530

Programming
- Format: Sports radio
- Affiliations: ESPN Radio; Westwood One; Cincinnati Bengals; FC Cincinnati; U of L Sports Network; UK Sports Network

Ownership
- Owner: iHeartMedia; (iHM Licenses, LLC)
- Sister stations: WEBN; WKFS; WKRC; WLW; WSAI

History
- First air date: September 16, 1929
- Former call signs: WCKY (1929–1994); WSAI (1994–2005)
- Call sign meaning: Originally licensed to Covington, Kentucky

Technical information
- Licensing authority: FCC
- Facility ID: 51722
- Class: A
- Power: 50,000 watts
- Transmitter coordinates: 39°3′55″N 84°36′27″W

Links
- Public license information: Public file; LMS
- Webcast: Listen live (via iHeartRadio)
- Website: espn1530.iheart.com

WCKY (1530 AM) is a commercial radio station licensed to Cincinnati, Ohio, and serving the Cincinnati metropolitan area with a sports radio format known as "ESPN 1530". Owned by iHeartMedia, its studios are located in the Kenwood section of Sycamore Township, while its transmitter site is in suburban Villa Hills, Kentucky. In addition to a standard analog transmission, WCKY is available online via iHeartRadio.

WCKY is a class A clear channel station, sharing the frequency with co-owned station KFBK in Sacramento. WCKY's daytime coverage is not nearly as large as that of other 50,000-watt stations, in part because of the reduced groundwave characteristic of its fairly high transmitting frequency. Its daytime city-grade signal only covers the Tri-State Area and the outer suburbs of Dayton. By comparison, WLW, aided by the superior groundwave of its much lower frequency of 700 kHz, can be heard at city-grade strength in large portions of Ohio, Indiana and Kentucky. However, WCKY's daytime signal provides at least secondary coverage to most of southwestern Ohio (including Dayton), central Kentucky (including Lexington and the outer suburbs of Louisville) and eastern Indiana (as far as the outer suburbs of Indianapolis).

WCKY has a long history of a powerful night-time signal, and its country music programming of the 1950s and 1960s brought listener responses from many points even outside the United States. It can still be heard in much of eastern and central North America with a good radio; it can be picked up as far as Chicago, Detroit, Wichita, and Miami. Nighttime power is fed to all four of its towers in a directional pattern, concentrating the signal in the Cincinnati and Dayton areas, while the Indiana side of the market only gets a grade B signal at night. WCKY and KFBK mutually limit interference with each other; however, as Class A stations, both receive more protection than other stations on this frequency. For this reason, WCKY does not have to change to its directional signal until three hours past local sunset. The only station it is required to protect is KFBK, and Sacramento is on Pacific Time, making sunset there three hours later than in Cincinnati, so WCKY's signal will not travel toward KFBK until after dark.

== History ==
WCKY received its initial authorization on February 14, 1929, for 5,000 watts on 1480 kHz, licensed to Covington, Kentucky–across the Ohio River from Cincinnati. The original owner was L. B. Wilson, a prominent local banker and theater owner. WCKY was added as a fourth station operating on a timesharing basis with three existing Chicago-area stations: WJAZ, WSOA and WORD. Moreover, the Federal Radio Commission (FRC) grant specified that WCKY would be assigned 4/7ths of the available broadcasting hours, and "was to have first choice of the broadcasting time".

After a series of successful test transmissions, WCKY made its debut broadcast on the evening of September 16, 1929. Under the timesharing agreement, the station's regular schedule was from 8 to 10 am, 2 to 4 pm, and 7:45 to 11:15 pm daily. In early 1930, WCKY and its timesharing partners were reassigned from 1480 kHz to 1490 kHz. WSOA later changed its call letters to WCHI, and was subsequently deleted on October 31, 1930, after which its former timeshare partner, WORD, changed its own call sign to WCHI.

Unsatisfied with its somewhat limited schedule, WCKY petitioned the FRC to delete the two remaining Chicago-area stations, and give it unlimited use of its frequency. An FRC examiner recommended that this request be denied, however a review by the full commission ruled in favor of WCKY on October 30, 1931, and ordered both WJAZ and WCHI deleted. WJAZ was deleted on November 23, 1931, however WCHI appealed the ruling, arguing that not only should it be allowed to remain on the air, but it, rather than WCKY, should have been assigned the hours previously used by WJAZ. The appeal was unsuccessful, and WCHI was formally deleted on May 7, 1932.

Although WCKY was licensed to Covington, for all intents and purposes it has always been a Cincinnati station. The fact it was licensed in Kentucky helped with its 1935 Federal Communications Commission (FCC) request, granted two years later, to increase power from the original 5,000 watts to 10,000 watts, which was followed in 1938 by permission to operate with a full 50,000 watts. This was done even though Cincinnati already had a 50,000 watt station, WLW, of its own. WCKY gradually moved its studios to Cincinnati, though it nominally remained licensed to Covington until 1939. On March 29, 1941, under the provisions of the North American Regional Broadcasting Agreement, WCKY moved to 1530 kHz, which has remained the station's assignment ever since.

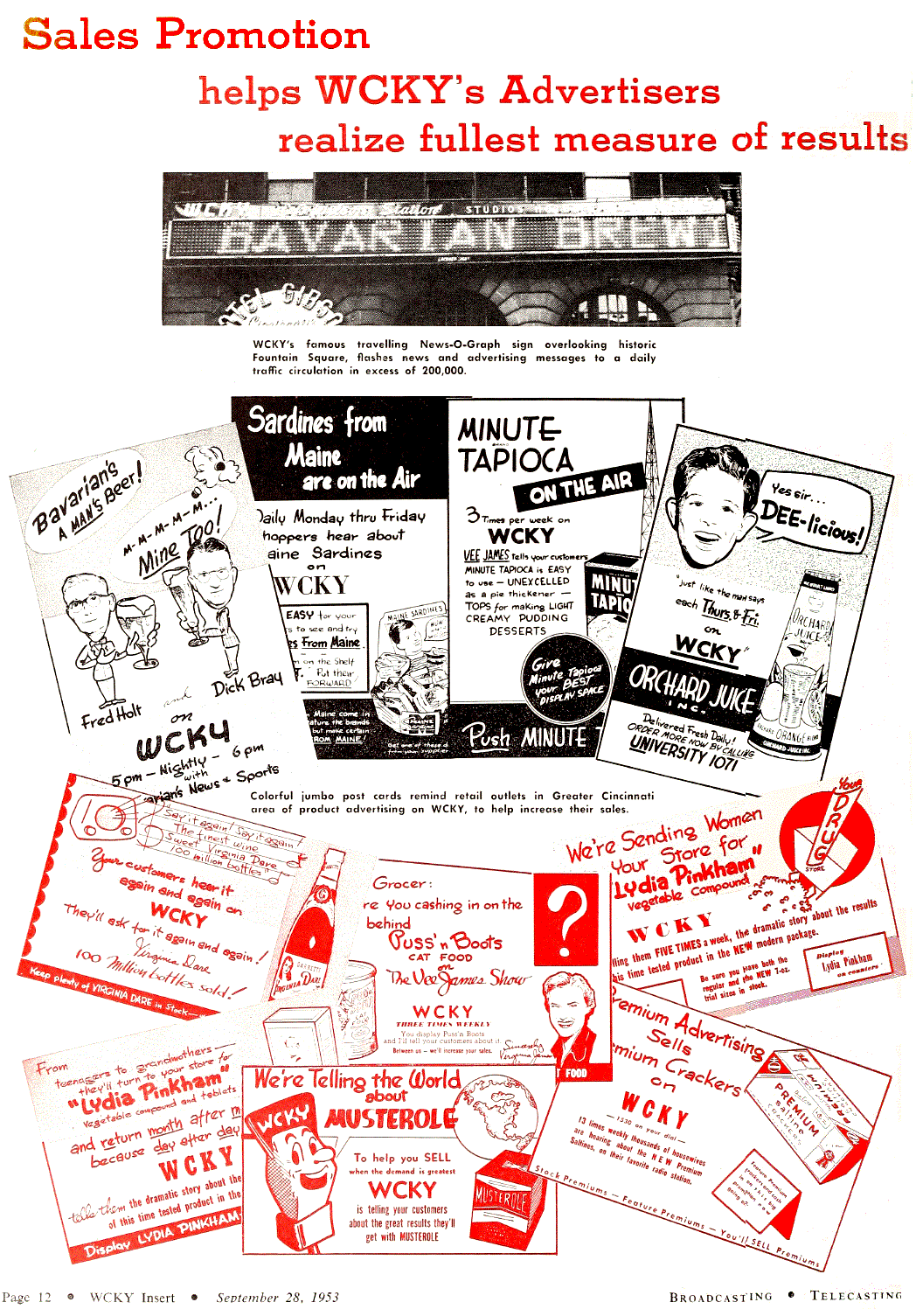
An independent station, WCKY promoted itself as a superior choice for advertisers (1953)

Perhaps one of the best-remembered programs in the station's history was the night-time "WCKY Jamboree" that ran from the 1940s until early 1964. It featured recorded country music with disc jockeys such as Wayne Rainey, Nelson King, Marty Roberts and Jimmy Logsdon. During the program, mail order merchandise was offered over the air. This program was widely popular due to WCKY's powerful signal especially to the south.

During the Cuban Missile Crisis in 1962, the station was used to broadcast news and information to the area, due to its southerly directional signal pattern.

During the mid-1960s, it was the flagship station for the Cincinnati Reds, identifying itself as "your 50,000 watt Big League Baseball Station". In 1964, in connection with WCKY obtaining Reds games, the station held a contest for the farthest listener. The winner was a U.S. serviceman stationed in Japan. The runner-up was in West Berlin. Dating back to the early 1970s, the station leased out much of the overnight hours to religious ministers because of the signal's overall reach. It is a practice that has survived numerous format and call sign changes to this day, although with a reduced presence following the most recent change to sports talk.

Wilson's family owned WCKY until the 1970s when it sold the station to The Washington Post, who in turn sold it off to Mishawaka, Indiana-based Federated Media. WCKY switched to news/talk and became the first radio station with this format in Cincinnati. The line-up included local host Mike McMurray and for a short time now national host Doug Stephan. Syndicated personalities included Bruce Williams, Sally Jessy Raphael and Larry King. WCKY was the local home for Rush Limbaugh when he debuted.

In the late 1970s, the station's nighttime directional array was changed from three- to four-towers. The original configuration favored skywave coverage of the South. The new pattern reduced the distant southern coverage, while strengthening the northern signal for local listeners around Cincinnati and Dayton.

Sold to Jacor Communications in 1994, along with sister station WOFX-FM (then WIMJ), WCKY's format changed with the times, from easy listening in the 1960s, to a country format in the 1970s and 1980s, to a news/talk format in the 1980s and early 1990s. Jacor was purchased by Clear Channel Communications (now known as iHeartMedia) in 1999. This made WCKY a sister station to Cincinnati's other 50,000-watt "flamethrower", WLW.

=== WSAI ===
On June 1, 1994, a call letter swap by Jacor Communications resulted in WSAI moving to 1530 AM, while the WCKY talk format and call sign were merged with WLWA 550 AM. The "new" WSAI featured a standards format, and the station began broadcasting in C-QUAM AM stereo. Nick Clooney returned to the station as afternoon host starting September 13, 1999, moving to mornings in November to replace Bob Braun, who left for health reasons. WSAI eventually switched to an oldies format in early 2003. "Real Oldies 1530 WSAI" played the Top 40 hits of the 1950s and 1960s, recreating the WSAI station from the sixties, including several former WSAI disc jockeys.

=== Return to WCKY ===
On January 17, 2005, the traditional WCKY call letters returned, as a company initiative to add liberal programming as a counter to Clear Channel's conservative juggernauts, Rush Limbaugh and Sean Hannity, resulted in a format change to a progressive talk format. The new WCKY was nicknamed "The Revolution of Talk Radio" and became one of Air America's few 50,000 watt affiliates in the east. The station introduced listeners from states all over the region to Air America personalities like Al Franken, Randi Rhodes, Marc Maron and Mike Malloy. The station served as the flagship station for Jerry Springer's liberal show as well. As such it attained a small but loyal following outside of Cincinnati but ratings in the conservative Cincinnati market were about half of the former oldies format. The WSAI call sign quietly returned to its previous frequency on the AM dial as sports talk "1360 Homer" (which first appeared on-air in 1997 under the WAZU calls).

On July 7, 2006, WCKY and WSAI switched programming once again, with WCKY airing sports talk programming as "1530 Homer", and WSAI airing the liberal/progressive talk format. A short while later the liberal talk format was eliminated on WSAI in favor of syndicated talk and consumer advice shows that appealed to a largely female audience. WSAI went back to a sports format in July 2007, this time as a 24-hour ESPN Radio affiliate to complement WCKY. WCKY and WSAI would switch network affiliations again on February 15, 2010, with Fox Sports Radio moving to WSAI and ESPN Radio moving to WCKY, dropping the "Homer" nickname on-air in favor of "ESPN 1530".

== Programming ==
WCKY is the Cincinnati affiliate for ESPN Radio; the flagship station for FC Cincinnati; a co-flagship station for the Cincinnati Bengals Radio Network; and the Cincinnati affiliate for both the UK Sports Network and the U of L Sports Network.
