= Zhoushan Island Overhead Powerline Tie =

Electric power infrastructure in China

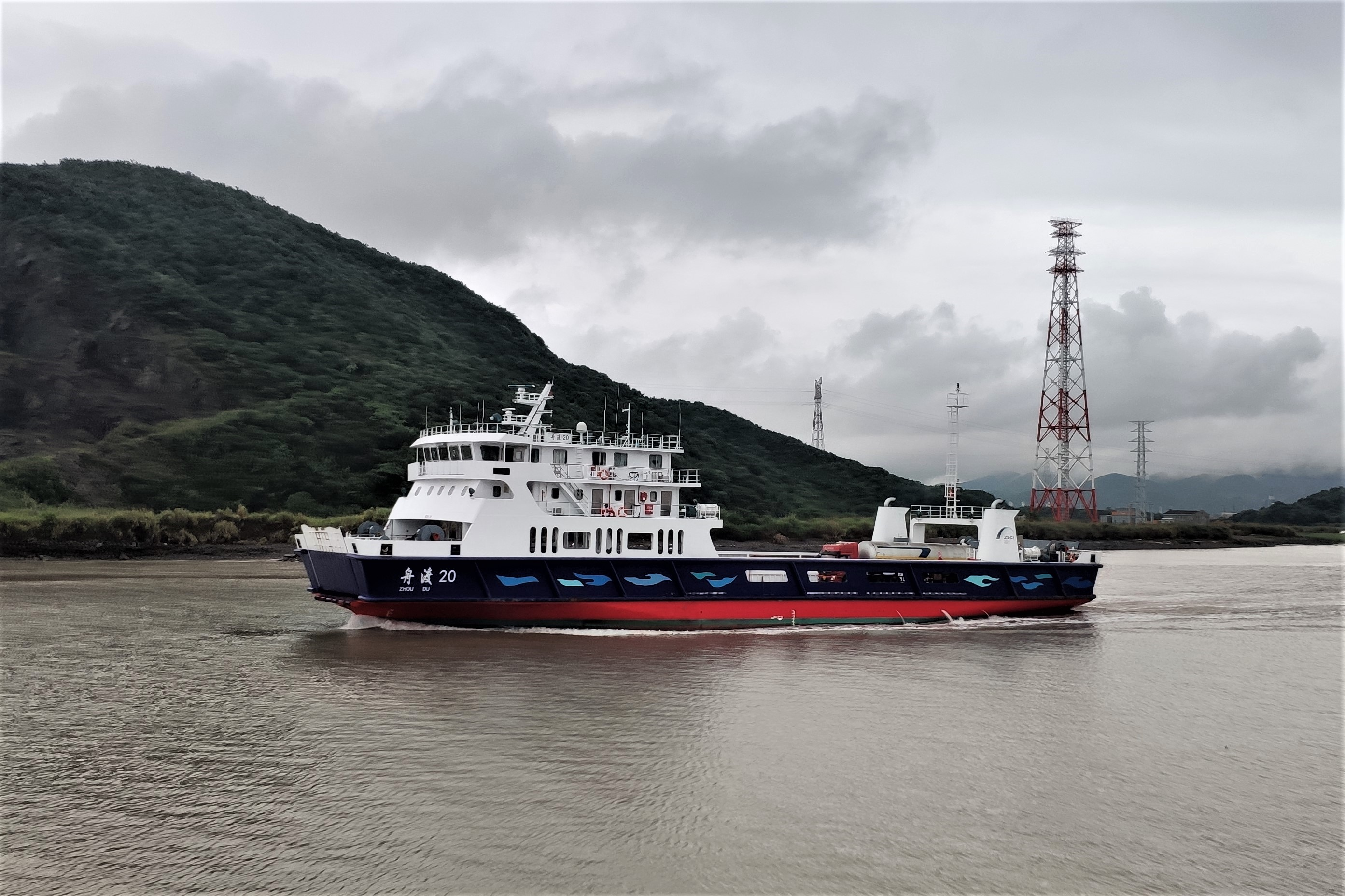
- Behind the ferry, one of the pylons of the overhead power link on Zhoushan Island.
- Interactive map of Zhoushan Island Overhead Powerline Tie

General information
- Completed: 2009
- Height: 370 metres (1,210 ft)

The Zhoushan Island Overhead Powerline Tie is a 220 kV three-phase AC interconnection of the power grid of Zhoushan Island with that of the Chinese mainland.

== Description ==
It runs over several islands and consists of several long-distance spans, the longest with a length of 2.7 kilometres (1.7 mi) south of Damao Island (Chinese: 大猫岛; pinyin: dà māo dǎo). This span uses two 370-metre-tall (1,210 ft) pylons, which were the highest electricity pylons in the world, until a 500 kV line to Zhoushan from mainland was completed. The north tower on Damao Island was completed in 2009, and the south tower on Liangmao Island (凉帽岛; liángmào dǎo) was completed in 2010. These pylons resemble those of the Messina Strait, but are steel-tube lattice structures.

== Coordinates ==
- 29°56′2.78″N 122°2′10.12″E
- 29°54′41.39″N 122°1′26.38″E

== See also ==
- Lattice tower
- List of tallest freestanding structures in the world
- List of tallest freestanding steel structures
