= Zhongyuan Tower =

- 中原福塔 (Zhōngyuán Fútǎ)
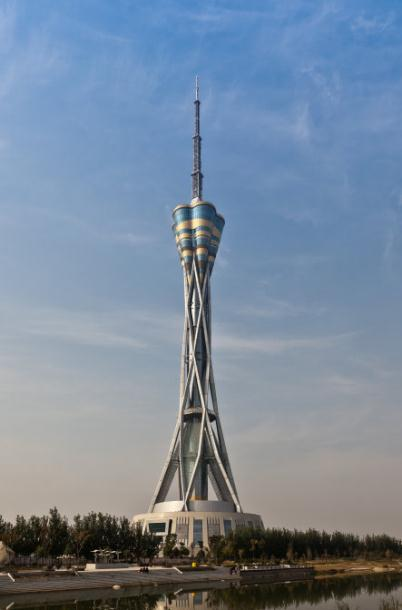
- Interactive map of the Zhongyuan Tower area
- Alternative names: Henan Province Radio & Television Tower; Tower of Fortune

General information
- Status: Completed
- Type: Steel freestanding tower
- Location: Hanghai East Road and Airport Expressway interchange, Zhengdong New Area, Zhengzhou, Henan province, China
- Coordinates: 34°43′29″N 113°43′22″E
- Construction started: 2007
- Completed: February 2011
- Cost: CN¥ 836,000,000

Height
- Architectural: 388 m (1,273 ft)
- Tip: 388 m (1,273 ft)

Design and construction
- Architect: Renle Ma

Website
- www.zhongyuanfuta.com

Zhongyuan Tower, also known as Henan Radio and Television Tower or "Tower of Fortune", is located in Zhengzhou, China. It is a multi-functional commercial, artistic and cultural center integrating radio and television broadcasting, tourism, cross-border trade, cultural performance, catering and leisure. The tower measures 268 metres (879 ft) high and the top antenna is 120 metres (390 ft) high, with a total height of 388 m. It is the world's second tallest steel tower after the Tokyo Skytree.

== Design ==
It required 22,000 tons of steel; its heaviest component is 40.2 tons. The structure is hot-dip galvanized and treated with fluorocarbon paint. It uses 850,000 high-strength bolt connections, replacing high-altitude welding technology. The installation accuracy is 99.98%.

The outer surface is a hyperbolic parabola. From the air, it looks like a plum blossom with five petals. The plum blossom is the provincial flower of Henan province. Five petals are homophonic with "five blessings" in Chinese. Looking up from the ground, the tower is like a static firework that spins upward and flies gracefully. The shape of the tower base is like a tripod, which was a symbol of power and prestige in ancient China. The shape of the tower is like the ancient Chinese musical instrument Chime Bells, which symbolizes the tower's communication function.

== Structure and function ==
Zhongyuan tower is divided into four parts: tower base, tower body, tower and mast.

The outer wall is decorated with reliefs: Relief 1: Nüwa creates mankind; Relief 2: Hou Yi shot down the sun. Relief 3: Shennong tastes herbs; Relief 4: Fuxi painting Bagua; Relief 5: the store of Luoshen; Relief 6: The Foolish old man removes the mountains; Relief 7: Luoshu, Relief 8: Cangjie creates words, Relief 9: Chang'e flies to the moon: Relief 10: Jingwei fills up the sea; Relief 11: Xuan bird creates Shang dynasty; Relief 12: Suiren products fire; Relief 13: Pangu creates the world.

The first floor of the base houses the Henan cross-border trade exhibition and trading center. The second floor is 6.9 meters high, with VIP hall, press conference hall, tourist service center and other supporting facilities. Third and fourth floors of the tower host the largest panoramic painting in the world, "Jinxiu Zhongyuan" (锦绣中原). The ninety-seventh floor of tower has sightseeing service facilities. The 98th floor is 255 meters above the ground, with a construction area of 975 square metres (10,490 sq ft) and an operating area of 780 square meters. The revolving restaurant is located there. The 101st floor is 265 meters above the ground level, with a building area of 1,142 square meters and an operating area of 940 square meters, serving the main business projects for high-altitude adventure projects.

== History ==
In February 2005, the project was approved by the National Development and Reform Commission, PRC.

In April 2006, the preliminary design began.

In November 2006, the design was offered by the architectural design and research institute of Tongji university.

On December 27, 2006, the construction began formally.

In March 2007, construction began.

In October 2009, the tower was completed.

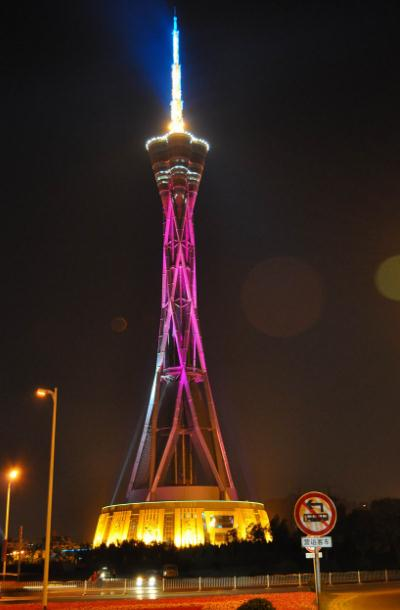
Zhongyuan tower at night.

== Awards ==
The tower received the Zhan Tianyou civil engineering prize from China Civil Engineering Society in March 2012.

The panorama painting "Jinxiu Zhongyuan" (锦绣中原) in the third and fourth floor center was selected by the Guinness World Records as the largest panoramic painting in the world on April 26, 2011.

== Transport ==
- Zhongyuan Tower station

== See also ==
- List of tallest towers in the world
- List of tallest freestanding structures in the world
- List of tallest freestanding steel structures
