= Yangtze River power line crossings =

Overhead power line crossing the Yangtze River

The Yangtze River power line crossings are overhead power lines that cross the Yangtze River in China. There are at least three power line crossings on the Yangtze River at Jiangyin, Nanjing, and Wuhu. The towers of the crossing in Jiangyin are among the highest in the world.

== Jiangyin ==
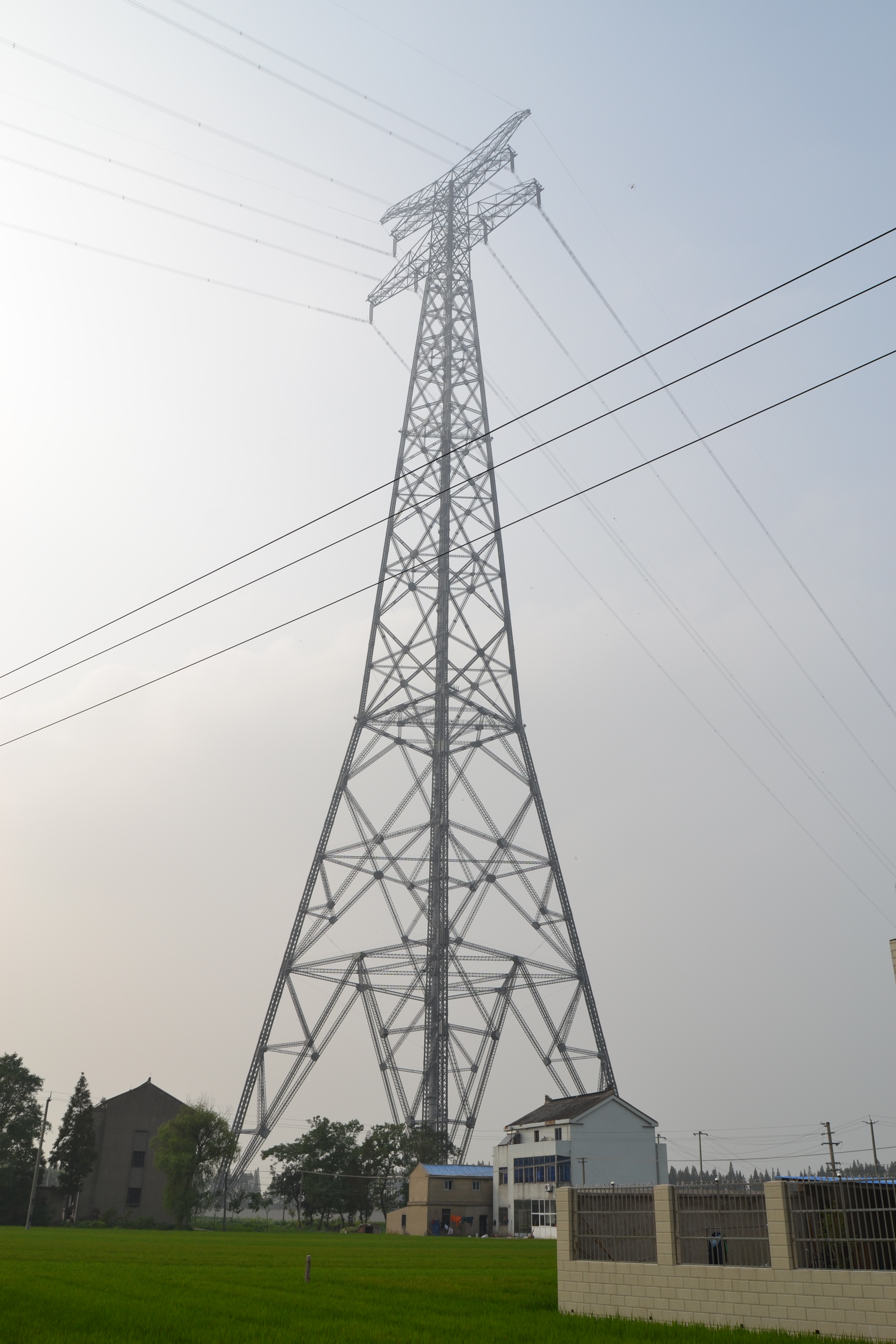
View of pylon in Jiangyin.

One exists at Jiangyin, Jiangsu Province, China. Each pylon is situated at 31°58′17″N 120°3′12″E and at 31°57′4″N 120°2′53″E. It is a section of the 500 kV power line from the Yancheng power station to the Dou Shan substation in the province of Jiangsu. The power line section running over the river has a span width of 2,303 m (7,556 ft). It is carried by two 346.5 m (1,137 ft) tall suspension towers, each weighing 4,192 tonnes. (for comparison, the towers even surpass the height of the Eiffel Tower, which is 324 m (1,063 ft), including antenna). They are identical lattice towers of square cross section with an area of 68 m (223 ft) × 68 m at the base and 8 m (26 ft) × 8 m at the top. The pylons carry four conductors on the lower crossarm, 312 m (1,024 ft) above ground, with a length of 77 m (253 ft) and two conductors on the upper crossarm. The insulator strings are 10 m (33 ft) long. These pylons are both equipped with an elevator which runs in a cylindrical tube in its center. A spiral staircase circles the elevator shaft outside.

On each side of the river are each main span pylon, followed by two anchor towers; one for each circuit. The anchor pylons are each 55 m (180 ft) tall, weigh 110 tonnes and stand on an area of 16 m × 24 m (52 ft × 79 ft).

Construction of the pylons started on November 8, 2002. They were completed on April 13, 2004. On November 18, 2004, the power line went into service.

== Nanjing ==
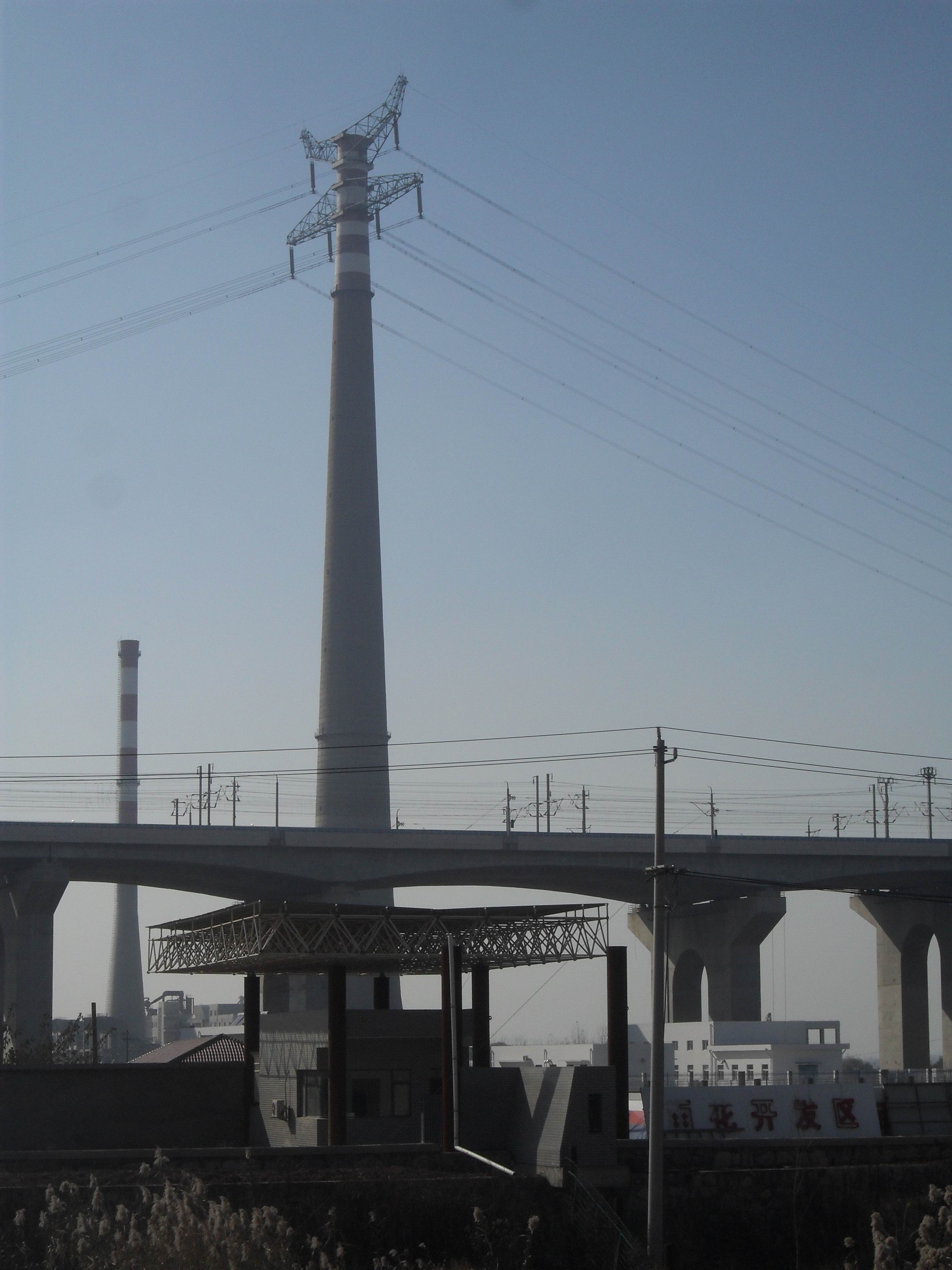
View of pylon in Nanjing.

A dual circuit, 500 kV AC overhead powerline crosses the Yangtze River at Nanjing, Jiangsu Province, China, built in 1992. It uses two 257 m (843 ft) tall pylons built of reinforced concrete, which may be the tallest pylons built out of concrete in the world. They are situated at 31°57′46″N 118°36′58″E and at 31°57′11″N 118°38′4″E and carry 6 conductors in two levels. The span width is 2,053 m (6,736 ft).

== Wuhu ==
The HVDC Three Gorges-Changzhou powerline crosses the Yangtze River near Wuhu, Anhui Province, China, at 31°30′2″N 118°22′11″E and 31°30′37″N 118°21′11″E. The pylons were built in 2003. The crossing consists of two 229 m (751 ft) tall pylons built as constructions of tubular steel, which carry two conductors. The span width is 1,910 m (6,266 ft). Close to it, there is a 500 kV AC powerline crossing with a span width of 1,960 m (6,430 ft) on probably taller towers and a 110 kV AC powerline crossing with a span width of 1,410 m (4,626 ft). Both AC crossings have 6 conductors.

== See also ==
- Lattice tower
- Yangtze River bridges and tunnels
- List of tallest buildings and structures in the world
- List of tallest freestanding structures in the world
- List of tallest freestanding steel structures
