= Net 25 Tower =

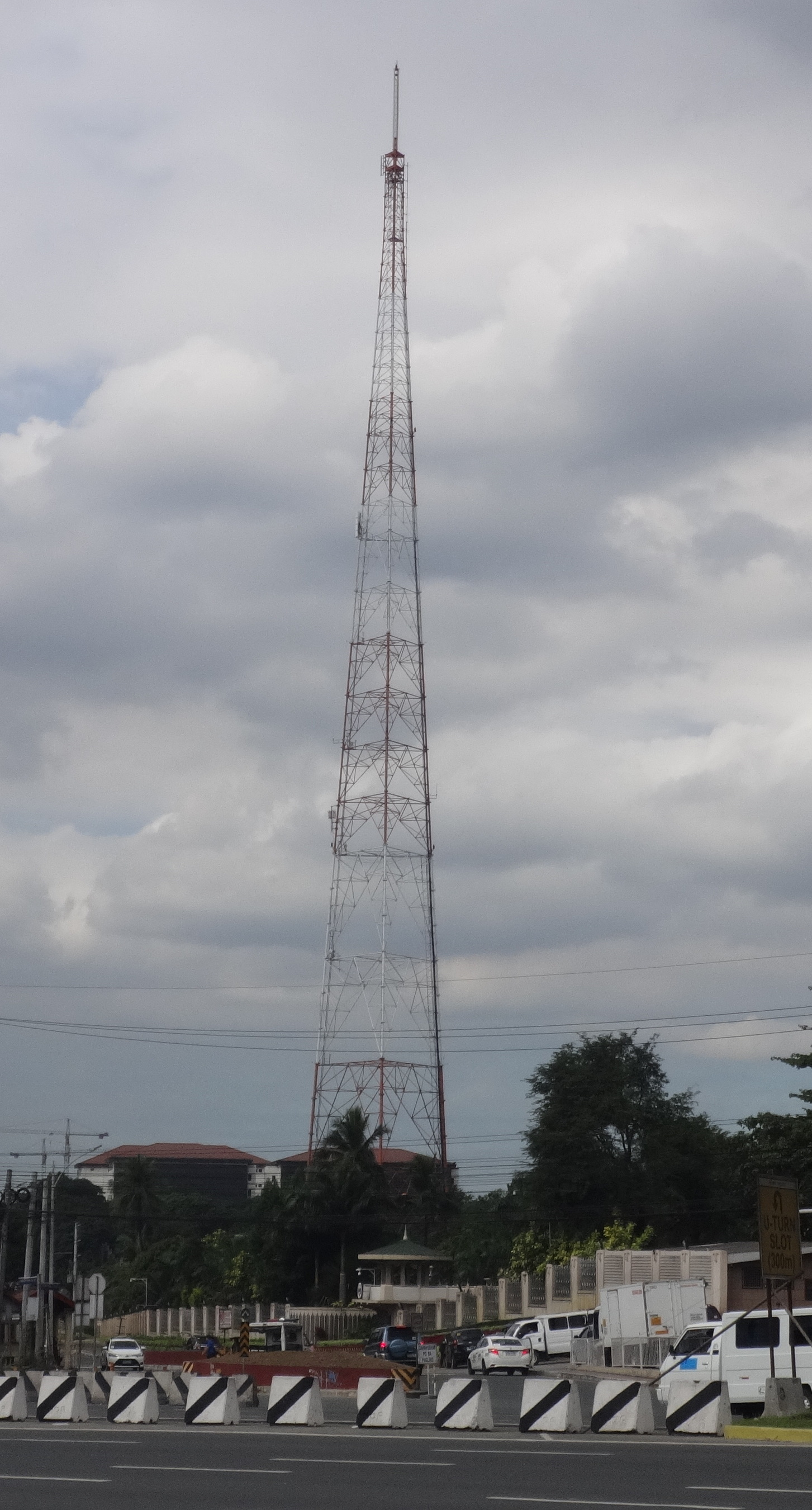
- Location: Quezon City, Metro Manila, Philippines
- Tower height: 276.4 m (907 ft)
- Coordinates: 14°39′45″N 121°03′36″E
- Built: 2000
- Owner: Eagle Broadcasting Corporation

The Net 25 tower is a free-standing lattice tower with a triangular cross-section used by Net 25 a Philippine television network based out of Quezon City. Built-in the year 2000, the tower stands 276.4 meters (907 ft) tall. It is currently the second tallest structure in the Philippines and one of the tallest lattice towers in the world. Its transmitter transmits the signals of Net 25 (DZEC-TV), INCTV 48 (DZCE-TV) & Eagle FM 95.5 (DWDM-FM).

== See also ==
- Lattice tower
- List of tallest freestanding steel structures
