= Zhuzhou Television Tower =

Television tower in Zhuzhou, China

Coordinates: 27°49′17″N 113°06′49″E

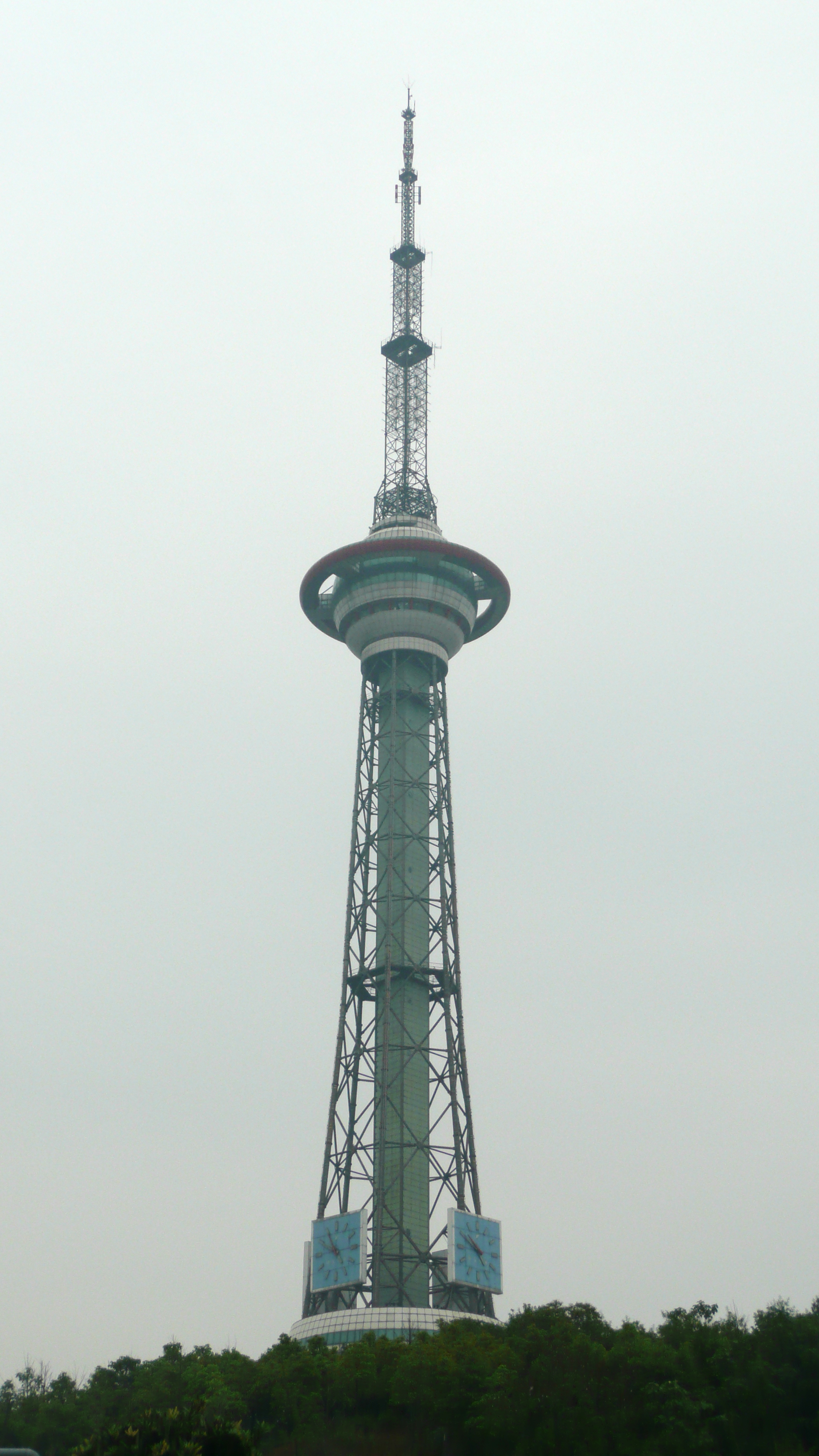
Zhuzhou Television Tower

Zhuzhou Television Tower is a 293-metre (961-foot) tall free standing telecommunications tower in Zhuzhou, Hunan, China. It is the ninth tallest tower in China, and the second tallest steel tower. It features a revolving restaurant and open-air observation deck. It broadcasts five television and two radio channels.

== History ==
It was completed in 1999 after three years of construction. The cost of construction was over US$13 million.

The immediate vicinity of the tower has since been redeveloped as a tourist attraction and renamed "Shennong City", and as part of the project the tower was renamed the "Shennong Tower".

Some redevelopment was carried out in 2006 to improve fire safety and add a ballroom to the lobby.

== See also ==
- List of towers
- Lattice tower
- List of tallest freestanding steel structures
- Shennong
