= List of tallest freestanding steel structures =

This is a list of tallest freestanding steel structures in the world past and present. To be a freestanding steel structure it must not be supported by guy wires, the list therefore does not include guyed masts and the main vertical and lateral structural elements and floor systems in the case of buildings, are constructed from steel. This type of construction is a rarity today as most tall buildings are built with a composite structure featuring a reinforced concrete core.

Oil platforms built using rigid steel jackets, such as the Bullwinkle (oil platform), are included and ranked as the local medium(water) does not provide any horizontal support. In fact they are over engineered specifically to resist water forces them rather than modulate them as compliant towers are designed to do.

Demolished structures and structures under construction are also included but not ranked.

== Steel structures (above 275 m / 900 ft in height) ==
indicates a structures no longer standing.
indicates a structure built in water.
indicates a structure under construction.

- For all structures the pinnacle height is given meaning it includes both spires and antennas as long as they are built of steel.

Rank	Name	Pinnacle height (metres / feet)		Year	Type	Main use	Country	City	Remarks	Coordinates
1	Tokyo Skytree	634	2,080	2012	Lattice tower	Observation, FM/TV-broadcasting	Japan	Tokyo	Tallest tower in the world. Inclusion on the list is debatable - the external steel lattice provides most of the structural support but the tower also has a concrete core. The two are structurally separated from each other and compensate each other to reduce the overall motion of the building during dynamic events such as earthquakes.	35°42′36.5″N 139°48′39″E
2	Bullwinkle Platform	529	1,736	1989	Rigid Steel Jacket (truss tower)	Oil Rig	United States	Gulf of Mexico	When built the Bullwinkle platform was the second tallest freestanding structure in the world after the CN Tower.	
3	Willis Tower (formerly Sears Tower)	527.0	1,729	1974	Skyscraper	Office, observation, FM/TV-broadcasting	United States	Chicago	Tallest building in the world 1974–1998 (by structural height).	41°52′44.1″N 87°38′10.2″W
	World Trade Center (1973–2001)	526.7	1,728	1973	Skyscraper	Office, observation, FM/TV-broadcasting	United States	New York City	Destroyed on 11 September 2001. Tallest freestanding structure that no longer exists. Tallest building in the world 1972–1974.	40°42′42″N 74°00′45″W
4	Pompano Platform	477	1,565	1994	Rigid Steel Jacket (truss tower)	Oil Rig	United States	Gulf of Mexico		
5	John Hancock Center	457.2	1,500	1969	Skyscraper	Office, residential, FM/TV-broadcasting	United States	Chicago	World's tallest mixed-use building 1969–2008.	41°53′55.68″N 87°37′22.8″W
6	Empire State Building	449	1,474	1931	Skyscraper	Office, observation, UHF/VHF-transmission	United States	New York City	Tallest freestanding structure 1931–1967. Tallest skyscraper 1931–1973. First Skyscraper with 100+ stories.	40°44′54.0″N 73°59′09″W
7	Harmony Platform	366	1,200	1992	Rigid Steel Jacket (truss tower)	Oil Rig	South Korea	California	Height is only to water level, total height between 1,400 and 1,500 ft, built in South Korea	
8	One Vanderbilt	427	1,401	2020	Skyscraper	Office, observation	United States	New York City		40.7530°N 73.9785°W
9	JPMorgan Chase World Headquarters	423	1,389	2025	Skyscraper	Office, observation	United States	New York City		
	Two World Trade Center (1973–2001)	415.3	1,362	1973	Skyscraper	Office, observation	United States	New York City	Destroyed on 11 September 2001.	40°42′42″N 74°00′45″W
10	Coelacanth Platform	400	1,312	2016	Rigid Steel Jacket (truss tower)	Oil Rig	United States	Gulf of Mexico		
11	Virgo Platform	344	1,130	1999	Rigid Steel Jacket (truss tower)	Oil Rig	United States	Gulf of Mexico	Height is only to water level, total height between 1,300 and 1,400 ft	
12	Heritage Platform	326	1,070	1992	Rigid Steel Jacket (truss tower)	Oil Rig	South Korea	California	Height is only to water level, total height between 1,300 and 1,400 ft, built in South Korea	
13	30 Hudson Yards	395	1,296	2019	Skyscraper	Office, observation, retail	United States	New York City	Has the highest outdoor observation deck in the Western Hemisphere.	40.754661°N 74.003783°W
14	Zhongyuan Tower	388	1,273	2010	Steel tower	Observation, FM/TV-broadcasting	China	Zhengzhou		34°43′29″N 113°43′22″E
15	Cognac Platform	385.5	1,265	1977	Rigid Steel Jacket (truss tower)	Oil Rig	United States	Gulf of Mexico		
16 tie	Kyiv TV Tower	385	1,263	1973	Lattice tower	FM/TV-broadcasting	Ukraine	Kyiv		50°28′16″N 30°27′12″E
16 tie	Yangtze River Crossing Jiangyin #2 North Tower	385	1,263	2022	Lattice tower	Electricity pylon	China	Jiangyin	Tallest pylons in the world	31°58′17″N 120°3′12″E
16 tie	Yangtze River Crossing Jiangyin #2 South Tower	385	1,263	2022	Lattice tower	Electricity pylon	China	Jiangyin		31°58′17″N 120°3′12″E
16 tie	Torch Tower (Japan)	385	1,263	2028	Skyscraper	Office, observation	Japan	Tokyo		
20 tie	Jintang and Cezi islands Overhead Powerline Tie, East Tower	380	1,247	2019	Lattice tower	Electricity pylon	China	Jintang Island	Second tallest set of electricity pylons in the world	
20 tie	Jintang and Cezi islands Overhead Powerline Tie, West tower	380	1,247	2019	Lattice tower	Electricity pylon	China	Jintang Island		
22	Tuntex Sky Tower	378	1,240	1997	Skyscraper	Hotel, office, observation, FM/TV-broadcasting	Taiwan	Kaohsiung		22°36′42″N 120°18′0″E
23	Tashkent Tower	374.9	1,230	1984	Steel tower	Observation, FM/TV-broadcasting	Uzbekistan	Tashkent		41°20′44.05″N 69°17′4.57″E
24	Almaty Tower	371.5	1,219	1983	Steel tower	Observation, FM/TV-broadcasting	Kazakhstan	Almaty	Tallest free-standing tubular steel structure.	43°13′44″N 76°58′34″E
25 tie	Zhoushan Island Overhead Powerline Tie North Tower	370	1,214	2010	Lattice tower	Electricity pylon	China	Zhoushan Island		29°56′2.78″N 122°2′10.12″E
25 tie	Zhoushan Island Overhead Powerline Tie South Tower	370	1,214	2010	Lattice tower	Electricity pylon	China	Zhoushan Island		29°54′41.39″N 122°1′26.38″E
27	Riga Radio and TV Tower	368.5	1,209	1987	Steel tower	Observation, FM/TV-broadcasting	Latvia	Riga	Tallest structure in the European Union.	56°55′26″N 24°08′14″E
28	Amberjack Platform	314	1,030	1991	Rigid Steel Jacket (truss tower)	Oil Rig	United States	Gulf of Mexico	Height is only to water level, total height between 1,200 and 1,300 ft	
29	Schipkau Wind Turbine	365	1,198	2026	Lattice tower	Wind Turbine	Germany	Schipkau		
30	Aon Center	362.5	1,189	1973	Skyscraper	Office	United States	Chicago		41°53′07″N 87°37′17″W
31	Taipei Twin Towers 1	360	1,181	2027	Skyscraper	Office	Taiwan	Taipei		
32	First Canadian Place	355	1,165	1975	Skyscraper	Office, FM/TV-broadcasting	Canada	Toronto	Tallest skyscraper in Canada	43°38′55″N 79°22′54″W
33	Hondo Platform	354.5	1,163	1976	Rigid Steel Jacket (truss tower)	Oil Rig	United States	Gulf of Mexico		
34 tie	Yangtze River Crossing North Tower	347	1,138	2003	Lattice tower	Electricity pylon	China	Jiangyin		31°58′17″N 120°3′12″E
34 tie	Yangtze River Crossing South Tower	347	1,138	2003	Lattice tower	Electricity pylon	China	Jiangyin		31°57′4″N 120°2′53″E
36	The Center	346	1,135	1998	Skyscraper	Office	Hong Kong	Hong Kong		22°17′05″N 114°09′16″E
37	4 Times Square	340.7	1,118	2000	Skyscraper	Office	United States	New York City		40°45′21″N 73°59′09″W
38	Dragon Tower	336	1,102	2000	Lattice tower	Observation, FM/TV-broadcasting	China	Harbin		45°44′45.55″N 126°40′28″E
39	Tokyo Tower	332.6	1,091	1958	Lattice tower	Observation, FM/TV-broadcasting	Japan	Tokyo	Second tallest structure in Japan	35°39′31″N 139°44′44″E
40	Minsheng Bank Building	331	1,087	2007	Skyscraper	Office	China	Wuhan		30.597°N 114.268°E
41	WITI TV Tower	329.4	1,081	1962	Lattice tower	FM/TV-broadcasting	United States	Shorewood (Milwaukee), Wisconsin		43°05′26″N 87°53′50″W
42 tie	Cerveza Platform	327	1,073	1981	Rigid Steel Jacket (truss tower)	Oil Rig	United States	Gulf of Mexico		
42 tie	Cerveza Light Platform	327	1,073	1981	Rigid Steel Jacket (truss tower)	Oil Rig	United States	Gulf of Mexico		
44 tie	St. Petersburg TV Tower	326	1,070	1962	Lattice tower	Observation, FM/TV-broadcasting	Russia	St. Petersburg		59°58′36″N 30°19′15″E
44 tie	Linyi Radio and TV Tower	326	1,070	2010	Steel tower	Observation, FM/TV-broadcasting, Amusement ride	China	Linyi		35°4′52″N 118°21′44″E
46	Eiffel Tower	324	1,063	1889	Lattice tower	Observation, FM/TV-broadcasting	France	Paris	Tallest structure in the world from 1889 to 1930; first structure to exceed 300 metres in height	48°51′29.6″N 2°17′40.2″E
47	WHDH-TV Tower	323.8	1,062	1960	Lattice tower	TV-broadcasting	United States	Newton, Massachusetts		42°18′41″N 71°12′58″W
48	Highwealth Huiguo 90	323	1,060	2028	Skyscraper	Office	Taiwan	Taichung		
49	Chrysler Building	319	1,046	1930	Skyscraper	Office	United States	New York City	Tallest structure in the world 1930–1931	40°45′06″N 73°58′31″W
50	New York Times Building	319	1,046	2007	Skyscraper	Office	United States	New York City		40°45′23″N 73°59′24″W
51	KCTV Broadcast Tower	317.6	1,042	1956	Lattice tower	TV-broadcasting	United States	Kansas City		39°04′15″N 94°34′58″W
52	The Spiral	314	1,041	2023	Skyscraper	Office, observation	United States	New York City		
	Turner Broadcasting tower (1967-2010)	314.3	1,031	1980	Lattice tower	TV-broadcasting	United States	Atlanta, Georgia	Demolished in 2010	33.7825°N 84.388611°W
53	TV Tower Yerevan	311.7	1,023	1977	Lattice tower	FM/TV-broadcasting	Armenia	Yerevan		40°10′16.64″N 44°32′10.77″E
54	U.S. Bank Tower	311	1,018	1990	Skyscraper	Office	United States	Los Angeles		34.0510°N 118.2542°W
55	Fazilka TV Tower	304.8	1,000	2007	Lattice tower	FM/TV-broadcasting	India	Fazilka		30°23′44.42″N 74°1′57.87″E
56	Wells Fargo Plaza	302	992	1983	Skyscraper	Office	United States	Houston		29.7584396°N 95.3682630°W
57 tie	Mumbai Television Tower	300	984	1972	Lattice tower	TV-broadcasting	India	Mumbai		19°00′26″N 72°49′12″E
57 tie	Abeno Harukas	300	984	2014	Skyscraper	Office, Observation	Japan	Osaka	Tallest skyscraper in Japan.	34°38′45.6″N 135°30′48.2″E
59	Sutro Tower	297.8	977	1973	Lattice tower	FM/TV-broadcasting	United States	San Francisco, California		37.75523°N 122.45284°W
60	Landmark Tower	296.3	972	1993	Skyscraper	Office, Observation	Japan	Yokohama		35°27′17″N 139°37′54″E
61 tie	Tucuruí transmission line North Tower	295	968	2013	Lattice tower	Electricity pylon	Brazil	Jurupari island		
61 tie	Tucuruí transmission line South Tower	295	968	2013	Lattice tower	Electricity pylon	Brazil	Jurupari island		
63	WKRQ Tower	294.6	967	1960's	Lattice tower	FM/TV-broadcasting	United States	Cincinnati, Ohio		39°06′59″N 84°30′07″W
64	Zhuzhou Television Tower	293	961	1999	Lattice tower	FM/TV-broadcasting	China	Shijiazhuang		27°49′17″N 113°06′49″E
65	Star Tower	290.8	954	1991	Lattice tower	FM/TV-broadcasting	United States	Cincinnati, Ohio	Landmark tower design	39°12′01″N 84°31′22″W
66	70 Pine Street	290.2	952	1932	Skyscraper	Office	United States	New York		40°42′23″N 74°00′27″W
67	WLWT TV Tower	289.6	950	1978	Lattice tower	TV-broadcasting	United States	Cincinnati, Ohio		39°07′27″N 84°31′18″W
68	One Liberty Place	288	945	1987	Skyscraper	Office	United States	Philadelphia		39.9522°N 75.1678°W
69	Dudelange Radio Tower	285	935	1957	Lattice tower	FM-broadcasting	Luxembourg	Dudelange		49°27′48″N 6°05′45″E
70 tie	Akashi Kaikyō Bridge North Tower	282.8	928	1998	Bridge	Transportation	Japan	Kobe		34.6162°N 135.0205°E
70 tie	Akashi Kaikyō Bridge South Tower	282.8	928	1998	Bridge	Transportation	Japan	Kobe		34.6162°N 135.0205°E
70 tie	Cheung Kong Centre	282.8	928	1999	Skyscraper	Office	Hong Kong	Hong Kong		22°16′46″N 114°09′37″E
73	40 Wall Street	282.6	927	1930	Skyscraper	Office	United States	New York		40.706964°N 74.009672°W
74 tie	United Overseas Bank Plaza	280	919	1992	Skyscraper	Office	Singapore	Singapore		1.28555°N 103.84972°E
74 tie	Shijiazhuang TV-tower	280	919	1998	Lattice tower	TV-broadcasting	China	Shijiazhuang		38°01′15.81″N 114°31′40.14″E
74 tie	AIR tower	280	919	2013	Lattice tower	FM-broadcasting	India	Amritsar	originally intended to be 300 m tall currently 280 m due to a tilt in the towers angle.	31°36′56.58″N 74°39′54.49″E
77 tie	Taipei Twin Towers 2	280	918	2027	Skyscraper	Office	Taiwan	Taipei		
77 tie	The Sky Taipei	280	918	2025	Skyscraper	Office	Taiwan	Taipei		
79	Citigroup Center	278.9	915	1977	Skyscraper	Office	United States	New York		40.758533°N 73.970314°W
80	OUB Centre	277.8	911	1992	Skyscraper	Office	Singapore	Singapore		1.2846°N 103.8510°E
81 tie	Prudential Tower	276.4	907	1964	Skyscraper	Office	United States	Boston	Tallest building in Boston when counting by pinnacle height.	
81 tie	Net 25 Tower	276.4	907	1990	Lattice tower	TV-broadcasting	Philippines	Quezon City		14°39′45″N 121°03′36″E
83	WCPO TV Tower	276	905	1965	Lattice tower	FM/TV-broadcasting	United States	Cincinnati, Ohio		39°07′30″N 84°29′56″W
84	Perm TV tower	275	902	2016	Lattice tower	FM/TV-broadcasting	Russia	Perm		58°21′40″N 56°17′27″E
85 tie	Tbilisi TV Broadcasting Tower	275	901	1972	Lattice tower	TV-broadcasting	Georgia	Tbilisi		41°41′45″N 44°47′05″E
85 tie	RCTI TV Tower	275	901	?	Lattice tower	TV-broadcasting	Indonesia	Jakarta		
85 tie	Williams Tower	275	901	1982	Skyscraper	Office	United States	Houston		29°44′14″N 95°27′41″W

== See also ==
- List of tallest buildings
- List of tallest towers
- List of tallest freestanding structures
- List of tallest buildings and structures
- List of tallest structures by country
- List of tallest oil platforms
- Lattice tower
