= HVDC Three Gorges – Changzhou =

HVDC transmission line in China

Location
- Country: China
- Coordinates: 30°47′6″N 111°31′48″E; 31°30′37″N 118°21′11″E; 31°30′02″N 118°22′11″E; 31°36′42″N 119°59′27″E
- General direction: north–south
- From: Three Gorges
- To: Changzhou

Ownership information
- Owner: China Power Grid Development Co.

Construction information
- Substation manufacturer: ABB
- Commissioned: 2004

Technical information
- Current type: HVDC
- Total length: 940 km (580 mi)
- Capacity: 3,000 MW
- AC voltage: 500 kV
- DC voltage: ±500 kV
- No. of poles: 2

The HVDC Three Gorges – Changzhou is a 940-kilometre (580 mi) long bipolar HVDC transmission line in China for the transmission of electric power from the Three Gorges power plant to the area of Changzhou.

The transmission line went into service in 2004. It runs from the static inverter station, Longquan, 31 miles (50 km) away from the Three Gorges power plant to the static inverter plant, Zhengping, near Changzhou. The HVDC Three Gorges-Changzhou is a bipolar 500 kV powerline with a maximum transmission power rating of 3,000 megawatts.

A part of the line is the Yangtze River Crossing Wuhu over Yangtze River using 229-metre (751 ft) tall pylons.

The electrode at Chujiahu is also used by HVDC Hubei - Shanghai for grounding.

== Sites ==
| Site | Coordinates |
|---|---|
| Longquan Static Inverter Plant | 30°47′6″N 111°31′48″E |
| Chujiahu Electrode | 30°36′26″N 111°54′51″E |
| Yangtze Powerline Crossing, Tower North | 31°30′37″N 118°21′11″E |
| Yangtze Powerline Crossing, Tower South | 31°30′02″N 118°22′11″E |
| Zhengping Electrode | 31°36′12″N 119°45′59″E |
| Zhengping Static Inverter Plant | 31°36′42″N 119°59′27″E |
