= WSAI =

Radio station in Cincinnati, Ohio

- Cincinnati, Ohio; United States
- Broadcast area: Cincinnati metropolitan area
- Frequency: 1360 kHz
- Branding: Fox Sports 1360

Programming
- Format: Sports radio
- Affiliations: Fox Sports Radio; Motor Racing Network; Westwood One

Ownership
- Owner: iHeartMedia; (iHM Licenses, LLC)
- Sister stations: WCKY, WEBN, WKFS, WKRC, WLW

History
- First air date: 1923
- Former call signs: WSAI (1923–1985); WWNK (1985–1988); WSAI (1988–1994); WAOZ (1994–1996); WAZU (1996–1997); WCKY (1997–2005)
- Call sign meaning: Randomly assigned, later slogan of "Sports And Information".

Technical information
- Licensing authority: FCC
- Facility ID: 41994
- Class: B
- Power: 5,000 watts
- Transmitter coordinates: 39°14′51″N 84°31′52″W

Links
- Public license information: Public file; LMS
- Webcast: Listen live (via iHeartRadio)
- Website: foxsports1360.iheart.com

WSAI (1360 AM) is a radio station in Cincinnati, Ohio. Owned and operated by iHeartMedia, its studios, as well as those of iHeartMedia's other Cincinnati stations, are in the Towers of Kenwood building next to I-71 in the Kenwood section of Sycamore Township, and its transmitter site is in Mount Healthy.

== Programming ==
WSAI is known as "Fox Sports 1360", and airs the entire Fox Sports Radio schedule, including The Dan Patrick Show, Rich Eisen, and Colin Cowherd. It is the Cincinnati affiliate for University of Louisville Cardinals football and basketball (if Kentucky is on ESPN 1530), NFL on Westwood One, NCAA college basketball on Westwood One, NCAA college football on Westwood One, and Columbus Blue Jackets hockey. WSAI also airs FC Cincinnati games if ESPN 1530 is airing NFL on Westwood One games at the same time.

== History ==
WSAI was first authorized, by telegram, on March 19, 1923, and was initially operated by the United States Playing Card Company. The station originally broadcast from company facilities on Beech Street in Norwood, Ohio. The WSAI call letters were randomly assigned from a sequential roster of available call signs.

Its first authorization was for operation on the shared "entertainment" wavelength of 360 meters (833 kHz). The single entertainment wavelength meant that stations within a given region had to make timesharing agreements to assign operating timeslots. In May 1923 the Department of Commerce set aside a band of "Class B" frequencies reserved for stations that had quality equipment and programming, and the Cincinnati region was assigned exclusive use of 970 kHz. WSAI began operating on this new frequency, sharing time with another Cincinnati station, WLW. In May 1924 a third Class B station was established in Cincinnati, WFBW (now WKRC), which the next month became WMH. WLW was unhappy with having to split time with two other stations, so in June 1924 government regulators moved WLW to 710 kHz, sharing time with WBAV (now WTVN) in Columbus.

At the Third National Radio Conference, held in October 1924, the Radio Corporation of America's (RCA) vice president and general manager, David Sarnoff, announced that his company planned to embark on the construction of a 50,000 watt station for New York City. At this time 1,000 watts was the maximum permitted, so this brought up fears by smaller stations that a group of powerful stations would monopolize the airwaves. In late 1924 Western Electric began selling radio transmitters capable of operating at 5,000 watts, but the Commerce Department, wary of the high-powered sets overwhelming local receivers, did not immediately allow stations to use the full power. Instead stations could start operating with up to 1,500 watts, then, only if approved by the region's Radio Supervisor, increase powers in successive 500 watt steps, while ensuring that it was not causing excessive interference.

In early 1925, WSAI and WMH moved to 920 kHz. The Commerce Department's cautious approach toward power increases was based on the assumption that station transmitters were located in heavily populated areas. However, in May 1925 it recognized that WSAI's Mason, Ohio and WLW's Harrison transmitter sites were both far enough from population centers that they could immediately begin operating as the first two stations in the nation transmitting with the full 5,000 watts. A Cincinnati Post writer investigated the effect of WSAI and WLW's May 11 introduction of the use of 5,000 watts, and found that despite claims that their "superpower broadcasting" would eliminate static within 500 miles, it was only "a start in the right direction". Listeners reported that the stations now sounded about twice as strong, and also noted that KDKA in Pittsburgh's 10,000 watts was even better.

In mid-1927, WSAI was assigned to 830 kHz. In May 1928 the Crosley Broadcasting Corporation began leasing WSAI, and also began to consolidate WSAI's operations with WLW. This included WLW moving its transmitter site from Harrison to sharing WSAI's facility at Mason. Crosley moved the WSAI transmitter to a hilltop site overlooking downtown Cincinnati on Chickasaw Street, which later became the transmitter site of WLWT television.

On November 11, 1928, under the provisions of the Federal Radio Commission's General Order 40, WSAI was assigned to 800 kHz. However, now classified as a "limited time" station, WSAI could only operate until sunset at the location of the frequency's primary stations, most notably WBAP in Fort Worth, Texas. To gain fulltime operation, in early 1929 WSAI moved to 1330 kHz, with a power reduction from 5,000 to 500 watts. WSAI was run as a locally oriented station, while the higher powered sister station WLW — with programs from NBC Radio and the Mutual Broadcasting System — aimed for the whole region.

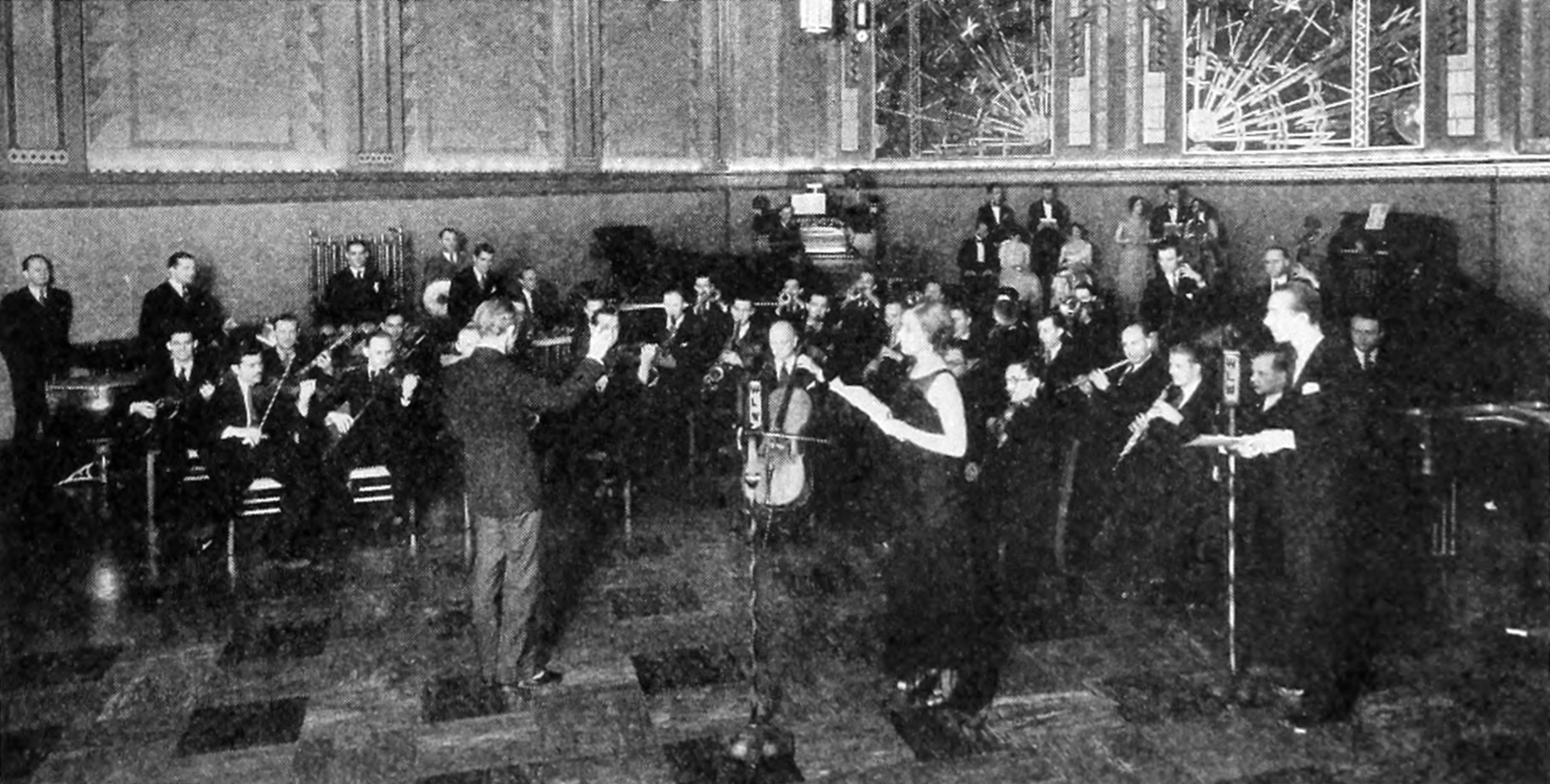
Photograph of one of the five new studios comprising the eighth floor of the new Crosley Radio Company building in Cincinnati, serving WLW and WSAI (1930)

On March 29, 1941, with the implementation of the North American Regional Broadcasting Agreement, stations on 1330 kHz, including WSAI, were moved to 1360 kHz. The August 1941 adoption of the Federal Communications Commission's "duopoly" rule restricted licensees from operating more than one radio station in a given market. At this time the Crosley Corporation owned both WLW and WSAI, so to conform with the new regulation in 1944 WSAI was sold to Marshall Field.

Like many AM stations of their era, WSAI began playing popular music, which segued into a Top 40 format. The transmitter was moved to the Daly Road site in Mount Healthy, where it is currently located. The studio was moved to 8th and Matson with a commanding view of downtown Cincinnati from the Price Hill Overlook.

WSAI featured Cincinnati's largest radio news staff headed by National Broadcasters Hall Of Fame inductee Rod Williams, who won numerous awards including a commendation from the Ohio General Assembly for combat reporting in Vietnam.

=== 1960s and 1970s ===
WSAI became Cincinnati's AM Top 40 powerhouse during the 1960s and 1970s, headed by personalities like Larry Gordon (America's Youngest Disk Jockey), Jim Scott, Robin Mitchell, Bob Goode, Buddy Baron, Roy Cooper, Ted McAllister, Jack Stahl, Dusty Rhodes, Casey Piotrowski, Larry Clark, Gary Allyn, Steve Kirk (later of WING, Dayton), Bob Harper, Mark Edwards, Dick Wagner, Bob Wayne, Steve Young, Bob White, Paul Purtan, Ron "King B" Britain (later of WCFL Chicago), and the station's youngest DJ, Michael Owens.

On August 21, 1978, WSAI switched to country music, which was replaced by a simulcast of soft rock FM station WWNK (formerly WSAI-FM) on August 26, 1985, that included a call letter change by the AM station to WWNK. (The WSAI call sign was transferred to 100.9 FM in October 1985, but was dropped after one year for WIZF).

=== 1980s and 1990s ===
On March 23, 1987, WWNK dropped the simulcast of WWNK-FM and became oldies as "K-Rock". In 1988, AM 1360 returned to WSAI, which enhanced the oldies format. In 1992 WSAI became the first station in the market to have a sports talk format, but this did not last long.

Charles Reynolds became the new owner of WSAI, but the station was leased out to Jacor Communications and the format was changed to adult standards. Jacor Communications then acquired the intellectual property of WCKY 1530 AM, and merged it with WLWA 550 AM (the former — and current — WKRC). On April 14, 1994, the WCKY calls were moved to 550 AM, the WSAI call letters and standards format moved to 1530 AM, and the former WSAI at AM 1360 became WAOZ, with a children's music format on April 18 of that year.

On August 30, 1996, WAOZ changed its call letters to WAZU, with a news/talk format. That format, in turn, changed back to sports talk as "1360 Homer" on December 12, 1997. The WAZU call letters were changed to WCKY, following the merger of Jacor with iHeartMedia (then known as Clear Channel Communications) that allowed WKRC to be restored on 550 AM.

"Homer" was initially seen by many as an also-ran in the market when compared to Cincinnati Reds flagship WLW, and against crosstown sports talk rival — and Bengals flagship — WBOB. However, WBOB — which simulcast the games with sister WUBE-FM — did not renew the Bengals' rights after the 1999 season, as its parent company AMFM merged with Clear Channel and both stations were split up.

WCKY slowly gained respect by gaining the radio rights to the Cincinnati Bengals via a three-way arrangement with WLW and WOFX. "1360 Homer" served as the AM flagship when the Bengals and the Cincinnati Reds baseball team share the season schedule. After the Reds' season ends, the games moved to WLW.

For several years the station operated as Original Hits 1530, WSAI and featured a nostalgia format featuring former TV personalities Bob Braun, Nick Clooney and Wirt Cain.

=== Later years ===
In January 2003, WSAI's Top 40 roots were revived on a sister station as "Real Oldies 1530 WSAI", which featured some of the original WSAI "good guys" from that era such as Dusty Rhodes, Jack Stahl, Ted McAllister and Casey Piotrowski as well as longtime Cincinnati Oldies personalities "Dangerous" Dan Allen, Marty (with the party) Thompson and Tom "Cat" Michaels. Some of the original 1960s jingles from the station's Top 40 days were used in addition to a sampling of some Drake-styled production values and the voice of CKLW veteran announcer Charlie Van Dyke voicing station IDs and promotional "liners" in-between songs.

On January 17, 2005, WCKY and WSAI swapped their call letters back to the original dial positions, with AM 1360 returning to WSAI, and AM 1530 returning to WCKY, although WSAI retained its sports format (albeit with the call letters only mentioned at the top of the hour), while AM 1530 as WCKY switched formats from oldies to liberal talk as radio stations were pressured to include left-leaning stations to balance the right leaning stations they also programmed.

On July 7, 2006, WCKY and WSAI switched formats, with the "Homer" sports/talk format moving to WCKY at 1530 AM, while WSAI picked up the liberal/progressive talk as "1360 WSAI: The Revolution of Talk Radio". This did not last long, as the ratings for liberal radio in Cincinnati were far below the previous music formats. Jerry Springer's show came to an end on December 11, 2006, and so did WSAI's progressive talk format. WSAI relaunched that day as "1360thesource.com", still carrying a talk format but heavily programmed with advice and consumer awareness-driven shows such as Clark Howard and Dr. Laura Schlessinger.

The new format lasted just six months, and WSAI went back to a sports on July 2, 2007, as "Cincinnati's ESPN 1360". As an all-network companion to sister station WCKY, which airs local talk during the day and carries various play-by-play, WSAI aired the entire ESPN Radio programming lineup. WSAI and WCKY stations swapped network affiliations on February 15, 2010, with WCKY affiliating with ESPN Radio as "ESPN 1530", while WSAI became "Fox Sports 1360", carrying the entire Fox Sports Radio lineup on a 24/7 basis.
