= WKFS =

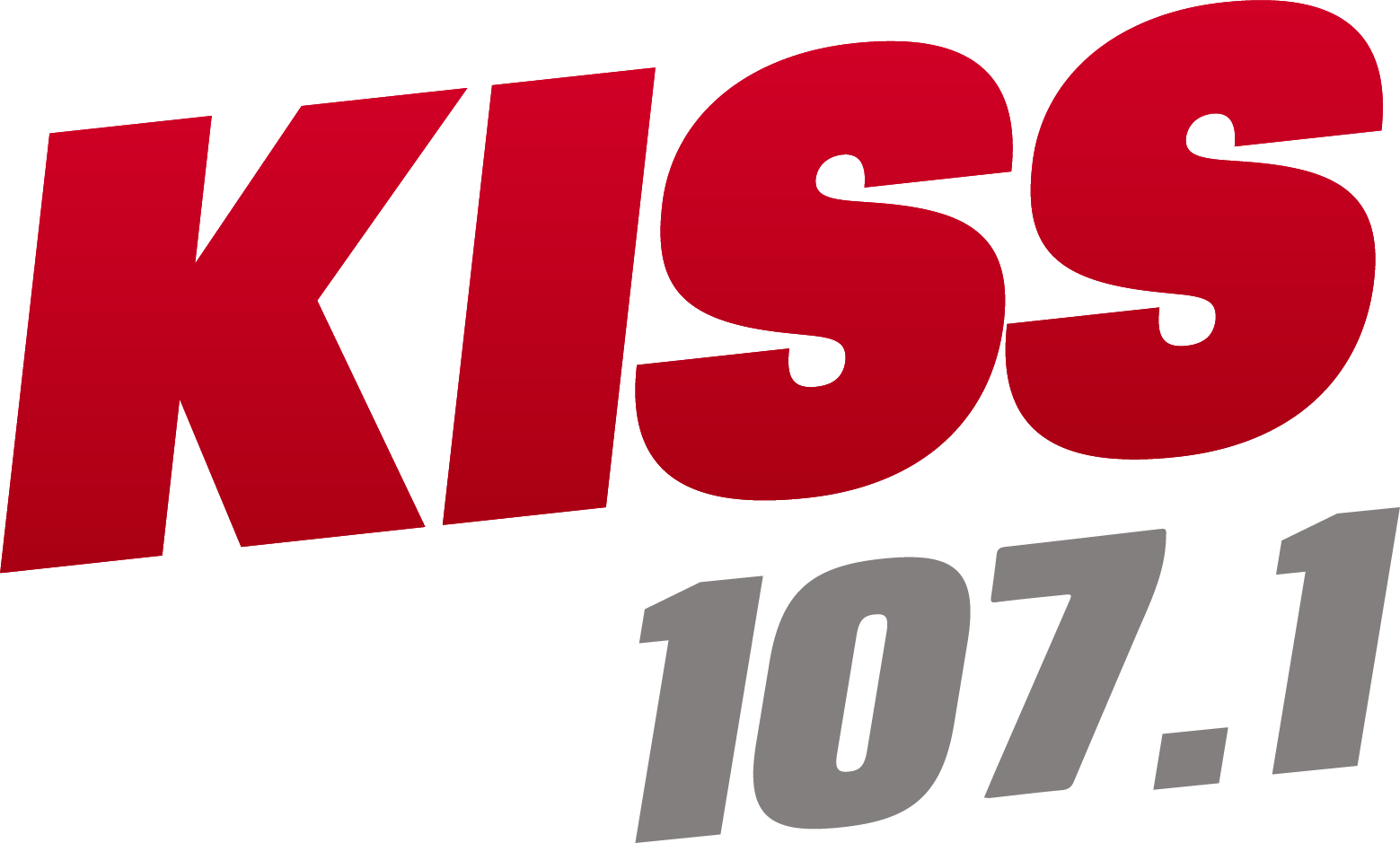
- Milford, Ohio; United States
- Broadcast area: Cincinnati, Ohio
- Frequency: 107.1 MHz (HD Radio)
- Branding: Kiss 107.1

Programming
- Format: Gold-leaning Top 40
- Subchannels: HD2: Pride Radio; HD3: Air1
- Affiliations: Premiere Networks

Ownership
- Owner: iHeartMedia; (iHM Licenses, LLC)
- Sister stations: WCKY; WEBN; WKRC; WLW; WSAI

History
- First air date: August 1, 1969
- Former call signs: WLYK (1969–1985); WRXY (1985–1986); WJOJ (1986–1988); WRBZ (1988–1991); WAQZ (1991–1998)
- Call sign meaning: "Kiss FM"

Technical information
- Licensing authority: FCC
- Facility ID: 70866
- Class: B1
- ERP: 2,800 watts
- HAAT: 264 meters (866 ft)
- Transmitter coordinates: 39.116°N 84.502°W

Links
- Public license information: Public file; LMS
- Webcast: Listen live (via iHeartRadio)
- Website: kisscincinnati.iheart.com

WKFS (107.1 FM, "Kiss 107.1") is a radio station licensed to Milford, Ohio, serving the Cincinnati radio market. It broadcasts a Gold-leaning Top 40 format and is owned by iHeartMedia. Its studios are located in Kenwood Towne Centre, and the station transmitter is located in Mount Auburn, a neighborhood northeast of downtown Cincinnati.

WKFS was established in 1969 as a local station for Milford and aired an easy listening format for most of the 1970s and early 1980s. After being sold, the station cycled through multiple low-rated formats, including adult contemporary, oldies, new age, and rock before finding stability in the 1990s with an alternative rock sound. The present contemporary hit radio format was instituted in 1998.

== History ==
=== Early years in Milford ===
On May 18, 1968, Milford Associates, Inc., applied to the Federal Communications Commission (FCC) for a new radio station on 107.1 MHz in Milford. The FCC granted the application on November 18, and station WLYK started broadcasting in August 1969 from a studio on Main Street in Milford and a transmitter at Dry Run. Its format consisted of middle-of-the-road music and news and sports features for Clermont County.

Shortly after going on the air, WLYK majority owner Fran Stratman's health deteriorated. A contract was signed to sell the station in 1970, but no transfer application materialized. In 1971, Stratman filed for a waiver to sell the station within three years of starting it—then only allowed in limited circumstances—to a new consortium of businessmen. The studios were moved into the Gatch farmhouse, built in 1793. Taking the name of the Beautiful Island Broadcasting Company, the consortium flipped the station in April 1972 to easy listening music using syndicated product from TM Productions of Dallas. Along with other programming changes, Cincinnati radio personality Bud Stagg was hired as a morning announcer, and ratings increased by 50 percent.

In 1975, Perry Samuels, a former head of Avco Broadcasting, purchased WLYK from Beautiful Island for $250,000. The station switched from TM's syndication service to one developed by Marlin Taylor of Bonneville Broadcast Consultants, a division of Bonneville International. Samuels kept the station in this format lane, even though it did take deviations. After dropping high school sports in the mid-1970s, Cincinnati Stingers hockey was added in 1979, and Moeller High School football was added in 1980. The latter proved particularly popular, attracting new advertisers and listeners (though not much new revenue) and motivating the station to sign a three-year contract extension with the school for 1983, 1984, and 1985.

=== Format changes in the 1980s and early 1990s ===
After Samuels reached a deal to sell WLYK in March 1982 and then called it off that same week, he sold it to the Cincinnati Broadcasting Company, led by Richard Hallberg and Bob DeLuca, in 1984. Despite initially planning to keep the beautiful music format, the new owners slowly moved the station to adult contemporary and changed the call letters to WRXY in March 1985. The new format was changed to oldies after just five months.

The third major change within less than 18 months came in 1986, when WRXY went to the syndicated "Format 41" soft adult contemporary programming from Transtar Radio Networks, retaining a local host in morning drive, and renamed itself WJOJ "Joy 107". Cincinnati Broadcasting sold WJOJ to Robert J. Plessinger for $1.287 million in a sale announced in December 1986. The "Joy" format, competing in a crowded adult contemporary marketplace, was replaced on December 11, 1988, by "The Breeze", a new age music format, under the new call sign of WRBZ. Despite all of the changes, there was one constant: Mike Vaught, a blind news director and announcer, who joined in 1976. At times, equipment at the station was customized and modified to allow Vaught to operate it. Another DJ was music director Ann Oliver, who worked simultaneously at WRBZ and as a nurse.

In April 1991, WRBZ dropped "The Breeze" to become "The Heat" with a satellite-fed, Top-40 format, adopting the WAQZ call sign the next month. The change was necessary because of low ratings: the music director noted that, often, giveaways and on-air promotions were met with no callers at all.

=== The Power Pig and Channel Z ===
Later in 1991, Plessinger signed a local marketing agreement, the first in the market, with Cincinnati-based Jacor to operate WAQZ. Speculation immediately ran rampant of a potential new format for the station. At year's end, the station dropped "The Heat" to become "The Power Pig", cloning a moniker used to great success by Jacor leader Randy Michaels at WFLZ-FM in Tampa, promoting "zero DJs and no music by dead guys" while seeking to run WZRZ (96.5 FM) out of the rock format. Seven months later, WZRZ flipped to country.

The Power Pig, however, overlapped considerably with Jacor's other FM, WEBN (102.7 FM), in terms of music, and this similarity hurt WEBN's ratings. As a result, in April 1993, the Power Pig came to an end and was replaced by an alternative rock format as "Channel Z", competing with WOXY (97.7 FM). Later that year, Plessinger sold the station license to Middle Market Broadcasting, owned by Chuck Reynolds, for $2 million.

=== Hit radio ===
In August 1998, Jacor flipped WAQZ back to contemporary hit radio (CHR) as WKFS "Kiss 107", beginning an attack on market-leading CHR WKRQ. (The WAQZ call letters were revived in 2000 on 97.3 FM when it flipped to alternative.) In January 1999, after nearly a decade running the Milford station, Jacor acquired it outright alongside WSAI and WCKY from Middle Market Broadcasting, which had leased all three. It was not until 2004 that WKFS and WVMX (94.1 FM) were united with the rest of the cluster, moving from their studios in Mount Auburn to new facilities in Kenwood.

In 2000, WKFS posted a major ratings increase to edge ahead of WKRQ for the first time. The station placed third overall in the market in the spring 2002 survey, part of a one-two-three sweep by WLW, WEBN, and WKFS. This success came as Clear Channel Communications (today's iHeartMedia), which had purchased Jacor in 1999, aggressively used voicetracking and the sharing of DJs among stations in similar formats, to the point that one Cincinnati Post column in 2002 noted the station had "almost no DJs based in Cincinnati". By 2019, however, the station was pulling less than half the rating of WKRQ.

WKFS began airing a local morning show hosted by Tiffany Potter in April 2021. It was the first time since 2012, when Jare and Joey were axed after less than six months to make way for The Kane Show, that WKFS had a local morning show. That was replaced in 2016 by Brooke & Jeffrey, also syndicated. The station is also local in afternoons with JonJon & Friends, featuring Jon Curl, formerly of WKRQ.

During the fourth of July weekend 2023, WKFS relaunched its CHR format in a manner mirroring similar format shifts done at WBBM-FM in Chicago and WPOW-FM in Miami, reducing current songs down to as low as three to four an hour and focusing primarily on "throwback" CHR hits from the 2000s and 2010s, with sweepers announcing "the Kiss you love is back" and introducing the temporary slogan "Your Summer Party Station". The move came as WKFS proved unable to beat WKRQ, finishing with only a 2.1 in the May 2023 Nielsen Audio ratings for the market, insurmountably behind WKRQ's 5.9 share.

== HD Radio ==
WKFS has been broadcasting in HD Radio since January 2006; its first HD2 subchannel offering was a classic hip-hop format, part of an expansion of multicasting across the Clear Channel portfolio.

At 1 p.m. on June 21, 2019, WKFS-HD2 began airing programming from "Pride Radio" under the slogan of "The Pulse of LGBTQ Cincinnati" to coincide with Cincinnati's Pride Day & parade.

The HD3 subchannel carries Air1 from the Educational Media Foundation under agreement. Two translators in the area depend on WKFS's feed of Air1, W245AJ Forest Park and W238BJ Auburn.
