= WEBN =

Rock radio station in Cincinnati

- Cincinnati, Ohio; United States
- Broadcast area: Greater Cincinnati
- Frequency: 102.7 MHz (HD Radio)
- Branding: 102.7 WEBN

Programming
- Format: Active rock
- Subchannels: HD2: Alternative rock; HD3: Mainstream urban
- Affiliations: Compass Media Networks; Cincinnati Bengals Radio Network

Ownership
- Owner: iHeartMedia; (iHM Licenses, LLC)
- Sister stations: WCKY, WKFS, WKRC, WLW, WSAI

History
- First air date: August 31, 1967

Technical information
- Licensing authority: FCC
- Facility ID: 29734
- Class: B
- ERP: 16,000 watts
- HAAT: 264 meters (866 ft)
- Transmitter coordinates: 39°06′59″N 84°30′07″W
- Translators: HD2: 100.7 W264BW (Norwood); HD3: 102.3 W272BY (Cincinnati); HD2: 106.3 W292CO (Middletown)

Links
- Public license information: Public file; LMS
- Webcast: Listen live (via iHeartRadio); Listen live (via iHeartRadio) (HD2); Listen live (via iHeartRadio) (HD3)
- Website: webn.iheart.com cincinnatiproject.iheart.com (HD2) thebeatcincy.iheart.com (HD3)

WEBN (102.7 FM) – branded as 102-7 WEBN – is a commercial active rock radio station licensed to Cincinnati, Ohio, serving Greater Cincinnati. Owned by iHeartMedia, WEBN serves as the FM flagship for the Cincinnati Bengals Radio Network. The WEBN studios are located in Cincinnati, as is the station transmitter. Besides a standard analog transmission, WEBN broadcasts over three HD Radio channels, and is available online via iHeartRadio. WEBN-HD2 simulcasts over local translators W264BW Norwood (100.7 FM) and W292CO Middletown (106.3 FM), while WEBN-HD3 simulcasts over W272BY Cincinnati (102.3 FM).

== History ==
When it initially went on the air on August the 31st of 1967, it was owned by Frank Wood Sr. a Cincinnati attorney. WEBN broadcast classical music daytimes and an all night blues and jazz program. The night programming was managed by a bank of 10½-inch Scully reel to reel tape machines in an early instance of station automation. However in the late evening hours of Saturdays and Sundays, it also broadcast a program called "The WEBN's Jelly Pudding Show", hosted by Frank's son and WEBN's first ever DJ, Program Director, General Manager, and Owner himself the late and great Frank Wood Jr., known by his on-air name "Dr. Michael Bo Xanadu". The series featured many album cuts by both popular and upcoming artists other than the recognized Top 40 and Urban Contemporary songs, even playing full-length versions of tracks only heard on Top 40 in their radio edits. The Jelly Pudding Show's slogan had only four musical genres that says it all; "Rock, Jazz, Folk And Ragas". The Jelly Pudding Show and their rock music proved to be so popular and so successful that WEBN eventually made this AOR show the bulk of its programming, much to the consternation of Frank Sr. himself.

However it honored its roots as a classical music station by broadcasting classical music on Sunday mornings from 8:00 am to 12:00 pm with Frank Wood Sr. as the host. This proved to be one of the station's most popular programs until Frank Sr. officially retired from WEBN on June the 30th of 1985. But perhaps the most distinctive feature of the program was Frank's weekly tradition of always playing a very long work which he preceded by announcing that the length of the work would give him enough time to eat a pie from Graeter's, a popular Cincinnati ice cream parlor that specializes in ice cream pies, confectioneries, and other baked goods. After Frank Sr.'s retirement (and before he died in 1991), the classical program continued for a few years with new host Larry Thomas from 55KRC and later began to include new age music. Its time was shifted from 6:00 am to 10:00 a.m. and the show eventually ended in 1987.

In its early days, WEBN broadcast from an old house in Cincinnati's westside Price Hill neighborhood, at 1050 Considine Ave. Referred to on-air as "Price's Mountain", any listener could visit the station/house at any time to watch EBN's personalities broadcast their shows live. The house wasn't hard to spot, as it was bright blue and had what appeared to be a Cocker Spaniel sitting in an old barbershop chair on the front porch. The taxidermied dog had been Frank Wood, Sr.'s pet, named Miles Duffy. Frank Sr., hosting a one-man show when he began the station, decided to name "Miles Duffy" WEBN's first fantasy program director to give the impression that WEBN had more employees than just himself. This joke continued officially for some years, even as the station continued to grow.

In 1973 WEBN moved to the eastside's Hyde Park Square referred to on air as "Hyde's Meadow". In 1988, the station moved to the neighborhood of Mount Adams, this time calling it "Frog's Mountain" joining with several other stations purchased in recent years by its corporate parent Jacor Communications. In 1999 Jacor was purchased by Clear Channel. Finally in 2004, all Cincinnati Clear Channel stations moved to the northern suburb of Sycamore Township. WEBN continued to call its location "Frog's Mountain". By 2006 WEBN was added to the Nielsen BDS Active Rock panel only to revert to Mainstream Rock the following year.

Radio personality Maxwell Slater Logan (Benjamin Bornstein), perhaps best known for his time at Cleveland rock station WMMS as host of The Maxwell Show, spent time at WEBN in early-to-mid 1990's under the on-air name Max Logan. Bo Matthews (Alex Gutierrez), formerly the program director at WMMS and a regular contributor to The Maxwell Show, took over as the WEBN program director on January 7, 2014. Matthews also served as vice president of programming for iHeartMedia's entire Cincinnati radio cluster before exiting the company in 2017.

From 2012 to 2026, mornings were hosted by Kidd Chris. He was fired in June 2026 as part of nationwide layoffs by iHeart Media.

=== Early advertising ===
Their eccentrical quirkyness also extended to actual advertising. Ad time on WEBN was extremely desirable to local merchants, but the station wasn't about to permit the staid and often amateurish production values that often permeated American radio. The majority of local spots were WEBN produced, and bore the same outrageous wit and audacity that the station was known for. And, as it had already promoted non-existent events, the station advertised products by "Brute Force Cybernetics", also the name of the corporate holding company. Brute Force Cybernetics featured a logo of three monkeys based on the theme "see no evil, hear no evil, speak no evil." Among the BFC "products" for which the station broadcast tongue-in-cheek "ads" were:

- "Boogie Mat" (a small rug; anyone who steps on it will begin to boogie uncontrollably)
- "Cultured Truffle Franchises"
- "Encephalographic Printout Device" (attach the electrodes to your head before going to sleep and the device will record the brilliant insight you otherwise remember having had just before you woke up and forgot what it was)
- "Negative-Calorie Cookies" (eating them actually burns calories)
- "Portable Hole" (apply it to a surface, peel off the plastic backing, make your stash or whatever, then remove)
- "Precognitive Scanner" (place it behind your ear, and it will read the speech center in your brain and emit a warning beep to prevent you from uttering "faux pas, Freudian slips, and ill-timed obscenities")
- "Stereo-Vision" TVs (a television mounted on a short track that bounced back and forth so quickly as to simulate 3D)
- "Voice Equalization Ampules" (wrapped in cotton and filled with helium or sulfur hexafluoride; break the ampule and inhale the gas to raise or lower the timbre of your voice, respectively)

These spots were picked up by some other stations, such as Chicago's WDAI in its progressive/underground days c. 1971.

Other spots were for the "White Rose and Lilac Virginity Restoration Clinic" and "WEBN's Tree Frog Beer". (starting out as "The Sleezy People's Beer" and then years later with "It doesn't taste like much but it sure gets you there faster"), and a spoof on the Rambo movies entitled "Sambo: Real Blood Part Four" featuring an African-American superhero driving a rescue Cadillac and yelling "Hey Chin Ho, Ronnie Reagan says you can kiss his white butt!" before a jet fly-over drowns out the last word. A crossover between these spots in fantasy and reality occurred in 1972 when Hudepohl Beer allowed some of its product for the Cincinnati area to be wrapped in faux labels for "WEBN's Tree Frog Beer; The Sleezy People's Beer", featuring Tree B. Frog and his best friend Tyrone Z. Dragonfly who soon became household mascots for the station. The station markets t-shirts and sweaters with the station's longtime mascot Tree B. Frog for August just before their annual fireworks show, as well in December with a holiday version. The tag line for Brute Force Cybernetics was "The company that creates a need and then fills it." The station began referring to itself with monikers, mottos, and slogans like, "RRRRRRIBBIT!", "Radio That Makes You Feel Good!", "For Something Different On Your Radio...", "Lighten Up!", "A Different Kind Of A Radio Station", "The Rock 'N' Roll Station", "The Classic Rock 'N' Roll Station", "Rockin' Stereo!", "Cincinnati's Undisputed Champion Of Rock 'N' Roll!", "The Last Great Untamed Radio Station In North America!", "WEBN Rocks Cincinnati!", "Good, Clean, Fun!", "Turn Us On, Tune Us In, And Crank It Up!", "Frog 'Em!", "It Must Be WEBN!", "Go Rock Yourself!", "Shut Up And Rock!", "It's Not Just The Size, It's The Frequency", "OutFrogRageous!", "No Pussies Allowed", "Cincinnati's Rock Station And The Home Of The Kidd Chris Show!", "Step Aside Small Change!", "The World's Greatest Rock 'N' Roll Station!","WEBN, The Lunatic Fringe", and the updated 1988 version "The Lunatic Fringe Of American FM", these 2 slogans come from Red Rider's iconic song "The Lunatic Fringe".

=== Local artists ===
WEBN was always passionate about promoting local artists. Also, the concept of national artists (who happened to be in town for shows) performing live in the radio studio began at WEBN.

As part of WEBN's commitment to promoting local artists, it began issuing a series of records featuring local artists, each designated a "WEBN Album Project," beginning in 1976. Proceeds from sales were donated to charity. The album projects featured exclusively local artists performing original songs. The album projects focused primarily on rock performances, but featured a wide range of different styles, including folk, jazz, and novelty songs. Popular local bands such as The Raisins and Wheels had cuts on WEBN album projects. WEBN often gave airplay to songs on the album projects. Eleven different WEBN album projects were released in the 1970s and 1980s, the WEBN album projects was also a launching pad to some stars that went on to do bigger and better successes; like Roger Troutman and his Funk/R&B electro band Zapp and Antonio "L.A." Reid who went to form the R&B/Bubblegum Pop group The Deele in the early to late '80's.

=== Fireworks show ===
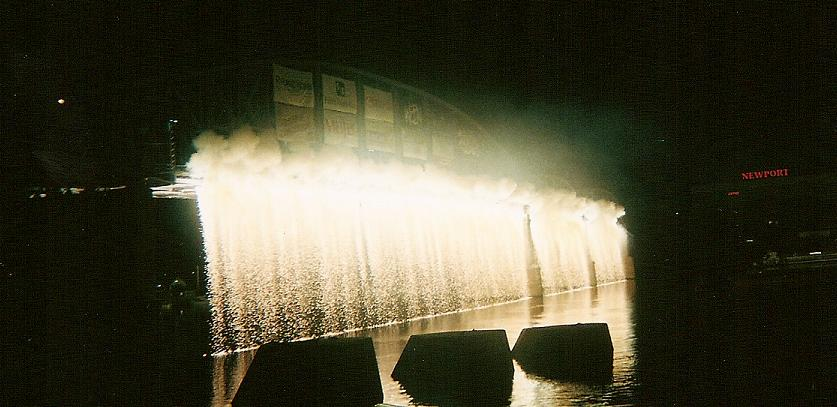
Riverfest/WEBN Fireworks is one of the most famous annual fireworks shows in the nation.

WEBN also presents the Cincinnati Riverfest annual fireworks display, a spectacular exhibition on the Riverfront, on Labor Day weekend in conjunction with Cincinnati Bell and Rozzi's Famous Fireworks. The seventeen-year agreement with Toyota came to an end in 2007. The show is set to music broadcast by the station. The first WEBN fireworks show happened in 1977 as a one-time celebration of the station's tenth birthday, but it was so well-received that it has been repeated every year since under the auspices of the station's "Committee for Aesthetic Public Spectacle." The event routinely draws over 500,000 people to the Cincinnati Riverfront.

The event has been broadcast live on local TV stations since 1984 when WXIX-TV aired the fireworks. In 2008, the show was broadcast in high definition for the first time on WLWT-TV. It was untelevised in 2015 when WXIX did not renew the contract, but the fireworks show returned to television in 2016 via WKRC-TV.

The event was held in a secret location in 2020 due to COVID-19. It took place at Kentucky Speedway.

== Current programming ==
=== HD2: The Project 100.7/106.3 ===
WEBN-HD2 logo

On August 16, 2012, translators W264BW Norwood (100.7 FM) and W292DT Mt. Auburn (106.3 FM) began simulcasting the alternative rock format on WEBN-HD2 as "The Project 100.7 / 106.3". As of January 2014, W292DT identifies as W238BJ and broadcasts at 95.5 FM; WEBN-HD2 itself continues to simulcast over 106.3 FM, now via translator W292CO Middletown. Although FM translators in the U.S. are generally not permitted to originate their own programming, the Federal Communications Commission has recently allowed FM translators to simulcast the programming of both AM stations and HD2 digital subchannels. In effect, this allows radio companies to create additional analog stations, like W264BW, outside the traditional path established by the FCC.

W264BW provides limited coverage to southern and central parts of Greater Cincinnati. On April 24, 2012, W264BW owner EMF Broadcasting, Inc. leased the translator to Clear Channel. Over W264BW, Clear Channel opted to simulcast the hot adult contemporary (hot AC) format heard on the HD2 subchannel of Cincinnati area station WKFS (107.1 FM). Branded "100.7 The River", WKFS-HD2 and W264BW aired content from Today's Mix, a national format on the Premium Choice network. On August 16, 2012 W264BW began simulcasting WEBN-HD2.

On May 29, 2013 CincyMusic.com announced a partnership with WEBN-HD2 to begin a weekly radio show called the CincyMusic Spotlight. "Cincinnati has such a rich music scene. The Project already champions amazing local acts like Walk The Moon, Foxy Shazam, 21 Pilots and Cinema Sleep in regular rotation. The Sunday Spotlight will give us a chance to expose even more of the talent Cincy has to offer, and provide local bands the platform to make it to the next level. As we were developing plans to showcase local music, it only made sense to turn to the foremost experts at CincyMusic.com to be the engine of that exploration" (Chris Williams Program Director, The Project 100.7 / 106.3)

Broadcast translators for WEBN-HD2
Call sign	Frequency	City of license	FID	ERP (W)	HAAT	Class	Transmitter coordinates	FCC info
W264BW	100.7 FM	Norwood, Ohio	139210	250	235.7 m (773 ft)	D	39°06′58.80″N 84°30′07.20″W	LMS
W292CO	106.3 FM	Middletown, Ohio	138872	250	203.1 m (666 ft)	D	39°16′23.80″N 84°31′37.20″W	LMS

=== HD3: 102.3 The Beat ===
WEBN-HD3 logo

WEBN-HD3 launched on December 18, 2014; the digital subchannel also began simulcasting over Cincinnati translator W272BY (102.3 FM). Branded "102.3 The Beat", WEBN-HD3 initially aired a classic hip-hop format promoted as "throwback hip hop and R&B". On March 7, 2016, the station shifted to a current-based mainstream urban format while keeping the "Beat" branding; this made it a direct competitor to WIZF 101.1.

Broadcast translator for WEBN-HD3
Call sign	Frequency	City of license	FID	ERP (W)	HAAT	Class	Transmitter coordinates	FCC info
W272BY	102.3 FM	Cincinnati, Ohio	144693	99	96.6 m (317 ft)	D	39°07′35.00″N 84°29′06.00″W	LMS
