= WKRC (AM) =

Talk radio station in Cincinnati

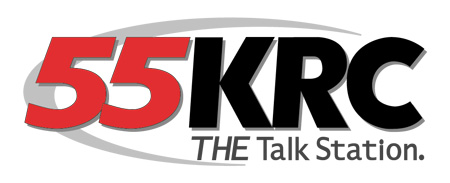
- Cincinnati, Ohio; United States
- Broadcast area: Cincinnati metropolitan area
- Frequency: 550 kHz
- Branding: 55KRC

Programming
- Format: talk radio
- Affiliations: 24/7 News; Premiere Networks; Westwood One; WXIX-TV

Ownership
- Owner: iHeartMedia, Inc.; (iHM Licenses, LLC)
- Sister stations: WCKY; WEBN; WKFS; WLW; WSAI

History
- First air date: May 22, 1924
- Former call signs: WFBW (1924); WMH (1924–1925); WKRC (1925–1993); WLWA (1993–1994); WCKY (1994–1997)
- Call sign meaning: "Kodel Radio Company" (former owner)

Technical information
- Licensing authority: FCC
- Facility ID: 29737
- Class: B
- Power: 5,000 watts (day); 1,000 watts (night)
- Transmitter coordinates: 39°00′29.22″N 84°26′38.79″W

Links
- Public license information: Public file; LMS
- Webcast: Listen live (via iHeartRadio)
- Website: 55krc.iheart.com

WKRC (550 kHz) is a commercial radio station licensed to Cincinnati, Ohio. The station airs a talk radio format, under the branding "55KRC". The station's offices and studios are on Montgomery Road off Interstate 71 in Cincinnati.

WKRC is powered at 5,000 watts by day and 1,000 watts at night, using a directional antenna with a four-tower array. Its transmitter site is off Murnan Road near the AA Highway (Kentucky Route 9) in Cold Spring, Kentucky.

Despite the similarities in their call sign, WKRC was not the inspiration behind the television show WKRP in Cincinnati. The show's creator, Hugh Wilson, wrote the premise based on personal experiences at WQXI in Atlanta.

== Programming ==
WKRC is co-owned with another Cincinnati iHeartMedia talk station, 700 WLW. While WLW airs mostly local talk and sports programming, WKRC largely carries nationally syndicated talk shows.

WKRC has one locally-based program in morning drive time hosted by Brian Thomas. Syndicated weekday shows include The Glenn Beck Radio Program, The Clay Travis and Buck Sexton Show, The Sean Hannity Show, Coast to Coast AM with George Noory, The Ramsey Show with Dave Ramsey and The Mark Levin Show.

Weekend programming includes specialty shows on money, health, retirement, technology, gardening and home repair, some of which are paid brokered programming. WKRC is the originating station for two weekly Premiere Networks shows: At Home with Gary Sullivan and In the Garden with Ron Wilson. It also carries The Kim Komando Show on Sunday evenings and repeats of some weekday shows.

== History ==
=== WFBW and WMH ===
WKRC is one of the oldest radio stations in Ohio. It was first licensed, as WFBW, on May 22, 1924. The owner was the Ainsworth-Gates Radio Company of Cincinnati. The original call letters were randomly assigned from a sequential roster of available call signs. The call letters changed to WMH on June 14, 1924. (An earlier WMH, which was Cincinnati's first broadcasting station, had been operated by the Precision Equipment Company until January 1923.)

In 1925, the station was purchased by the Kodel Radio Corporation. That firm changed the call letters to WKRC to match its initials.

=== CBS Radio ===
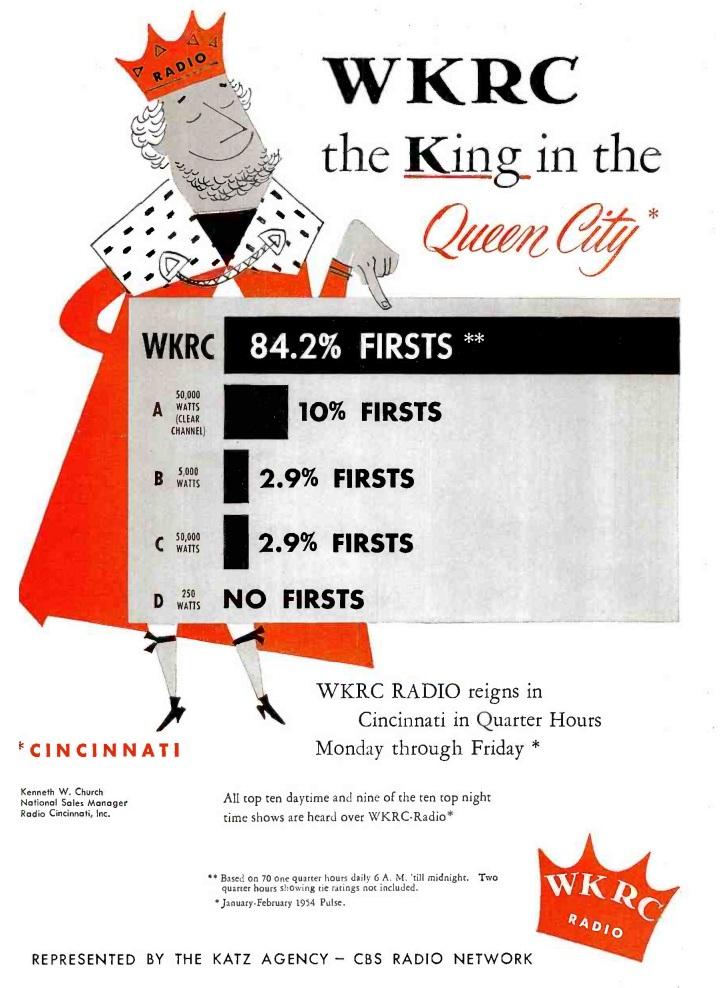
1954 station advertisement

WKRC was a charter member of the CBS Radio Network. It was one of the 16 stations that aired the first CBS network program on September 18, 1927. CBS purchased WKRC in November 1931, turning it into an owned and operated station.

CBS sold WKRC to The Cincinnati Times-Star in September 1939. The Times-Star was owned by the Taft family. This purchase was the genesis of Taft Broadcasting, with WKRC as its flagship station.

=== FM and TV stations ===
In 1947, Taft signed on an FM station at 101.9 MHz. The FM station used its own call sign at first, WCTS, which stood for Cincinnati Times-Star. It later switched to WKRC-FM and today is WKRQ. In 1949, Taft Broadcasting added Cincinnati's second television station, Channel 11 WKRC-TV (now on Channel 12).

As network programming moved from radio to television in the 1950s, WKRC switched to a full service middle of the road (MOR) music format and was an affiliate of the ABC Entertainment Radio Network. In the 1980s, the music moved from MOR to adult contemporary.

=== WLWA and WCKY ===
On November 29, 1992, after Jacor acquired the station via a local marketing agreement (LMA), WKRC began stunting with a computerized countdown. A week later, WKRC debuted a new talk radio format with the call letters WLWA, as a complementary service to WLW.

In 1994, the call letters were changed from WLWA to WCKY. The station inherited the call sign and some programming used on WCKY 1530 AM, which was renamed WSAI (now on 1360 AM).

=== Clear Channel ownership ===
In 1997, the long-time call letters WKRC returned to 550 AM. The station began offering a schedule of local and national talk programs, some of them from Westwood One. In 1999, Clear Channel Communications, the forerunner of current owner iHeartMedia, acquired Jacor Broadcasting, including WKRC.

WKRC is the former sister station to WKRC-TV in Cincinnati, both having been owned by Taft Broadcasting, Jacor Communications, and Clear Channel Communications. In 2008, Clear Channel sold WKRC-TV and its other television stations to Newport Television, LLC. In 2014, Clear Channel changed its name to iHeartMedia, Inc.
