= KCTV Broadcast Tower =

Communications tower in Kansas City, Missouri

KCTV Tower
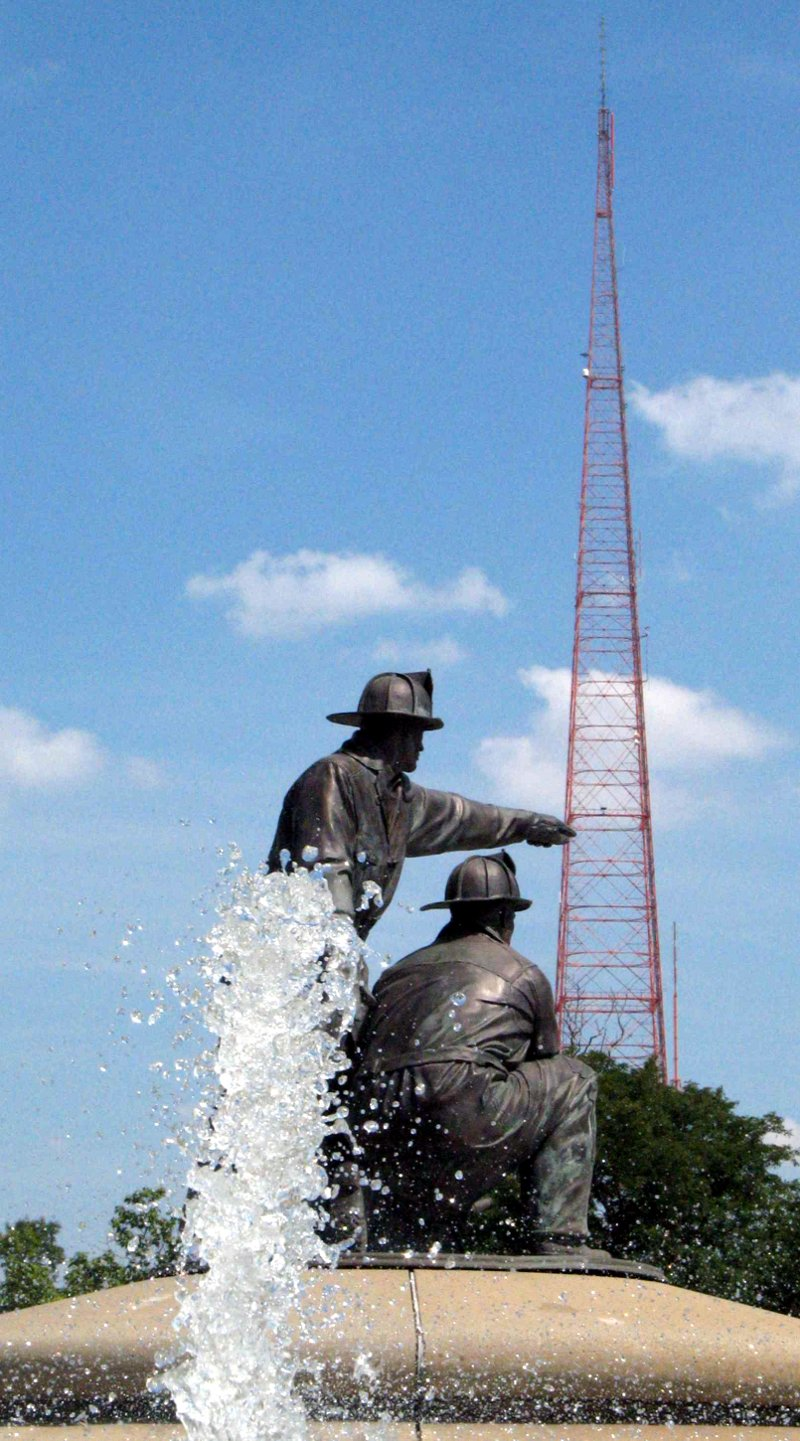

- Location within the United States

General information
- Status: Completed
- Type: Steel lattice television tower
- Location: Kansas City, Missouri
- Coordinates: 39°04′14″N 94°34′57″W
- Completed: 1956
- Owner: Gray Media

Height
- Height: 317.6 m (1,042 ft)

Design and construction
- Main contractor: C. H. Fisher and Company

KCTV Tower is a 1,042-foot (318 m) high freestanding steel lattice tower located at East 31st Street on Union Hill (south of downtown) in Kansas City, Missouri, United States. It was built in 1956 for KCMO-TV (now KCTV), which has been broadcast from the mast since its completion. For a time after its completion, it was the world's tallest freestanding structure. It is a Kansas City landmark and over the years has featured various types of nighttime lighting.

== History ==
=== Background and construction ===
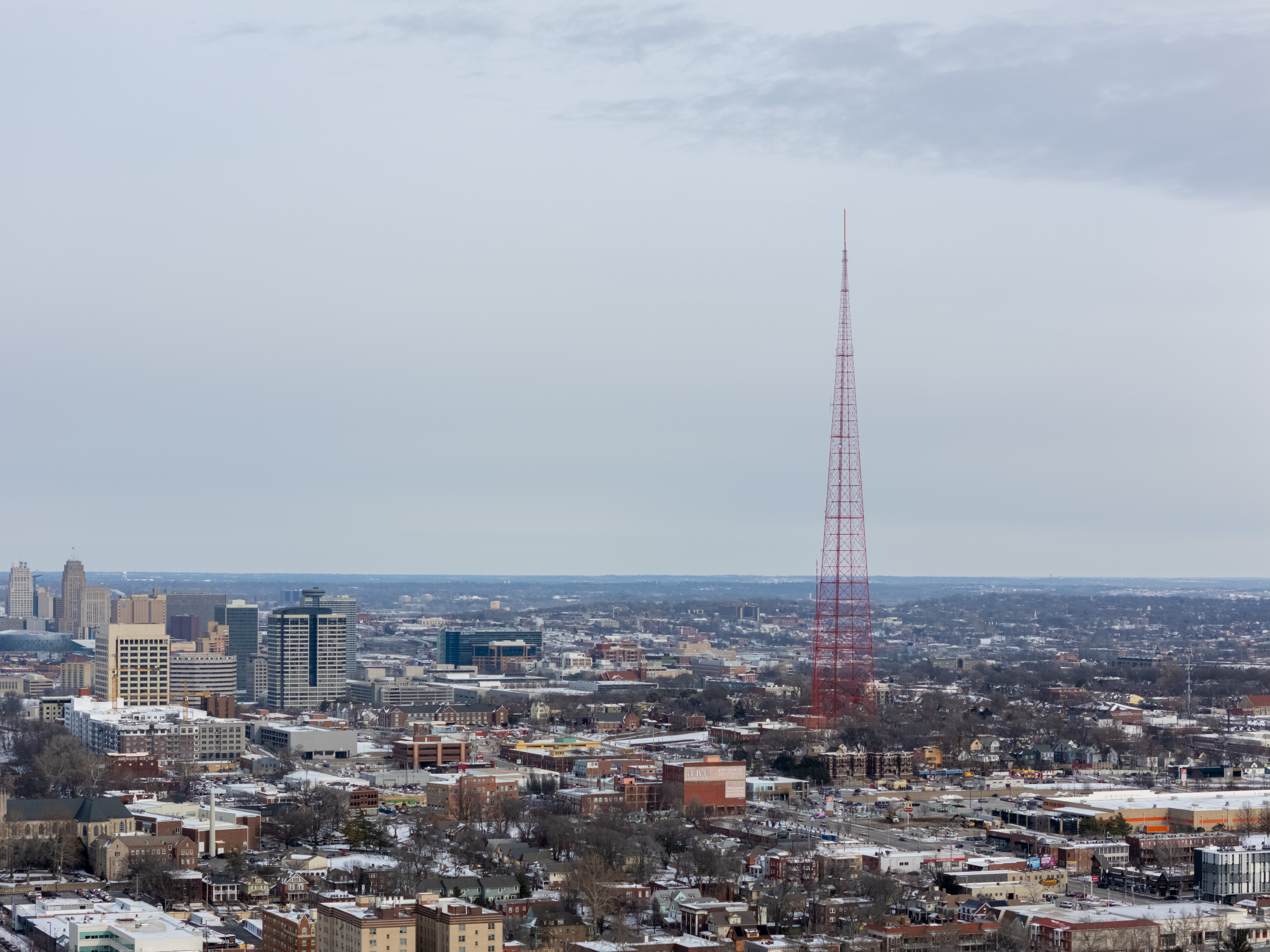
KCTV Tower as seen from the South West.

KCMO-TV began broadcasting on September 27, 1953. A 450-foot (137 m) tower, erected in 1949, already existed at the site and was in use by KCMO's associated FM radio station, KCMO-FM. Shortly after the television station began, KCMO-TV management began studying the erection of a larger tower, which received city building approval in November 1954. Because of the development around the studios, a tower supported by guy wires was impractical, so a self-supported tower was chosen. General manager E. K. Hartenbower told The Kansas City Star that, despite its costs, such a mast would also "be more spectacular in effect". With a planned height of 1,049 feet (320 m), it was touted as being the second-tallest freestanding structure in the world, ahead of the Eiffel Tower in Paris but behind the Empire State Building. Comparisons to the Eiffel led Kansas City's building commissioner to dub the facility the "Eye-full Tower". The Eiffel later surpassed the KCTV tower in height when a television antenna was added.

Erection of the tower began in late May 1955 under the guidance of the C. H. Fisher Company. KCMO-TV began broadcasting from the new tower on February 22, 1956. It increased its power to 100,000 watts, which together with the increased height increased the station's coverage area. The project cost $420,000 and used 600 metric tons (590 long tons; 660 short tons) of steel.

KCMO-TV moved its operations to Fairway, Kansas, in 1977. When the station announced its plans to move, Kansas City, Missouri, expressed dismay at the proposed relocation of the radio and television stations and even suggested dismantling the large tower beside the studios as an icing hazard in winter. Falling ice from the tower has been known to damage nearby cars and homes and require police to block off adjacent streets. In 1983, KCMO-TV became KCTV when the television and radio stations were split.

Visible on a clear day from within 10 to 15 miles (16 to 24 km), the KCTV Tower became a Kansas City landmark. In 1972, two Vietnam War protesters scaled the tower. Proposals over the years suggested changing its shape to resemble a saxophone or mounting a laser to point to other Kansas City landmarks.

== Lighting ==
The tower has had several different lighting schemes in its history and for decades sported 1,360 white light bulbs plus 432 red bulbs on the top third. It first went dark for a year during the 1973 energy crisis; it was flashed on in the evening and then turned off as a reminder to Kansas Citians to conserve electricity. Between 1989 and 1993, the lights were flashed for a time in upward- or downward-moving patterns to suggest the day's weather forecast. For a time after the September 11 attacks, the lights were changed to red, white, and blue. Replacement of the bulbs was becoming a frequent event by 1997, when about half of the 1,360 bulbs needed to be replaced annually. The tower went dark beginning in 2005, when it was turned off because most of the light bulbs had burned out.

Several proposals were floated in the 2010s to light the tower as an art installation. In 2015, a non-profit organization called The Tower KC, Inc., was founded with the goal of re-lighting the tower as a public art piece designed by Kansas City Art Institute faculty member James Woodfill. Woodfill's design, Seeing the Night Bluely, would have reproduced the colors of the day's sky in a loop using new LED light bulbs. The Tower KC claimed that this installation would be the tallest public art piece in the world. KCTV's owner at the time, Meredith Corporation, had no plans to light the tower due to the logistics involved. The Tower KC's proposal raised only $300,000 of a planned $2 million cost and, after failing to be selected for a grant from Bloomberg Philanthropies, came to a halt at the onset of the COVID-19 pandemic.

As part of Illuminate KC, a city initiative to illuminate buildings and landmarks in Kansas City, Missouri, the city council agreed to ask Gray to reach an agreement to install lighting on the tower in May 2025. Previously, in late 2024, a lighting test was conducted. A new permanent lighting installation featuring 96 LED fixtures capable of dynamic displays and color-changing effects was activated on September 18, 2025, ahead of the 2026 FIFA World Cup, which will feature some matches in Kansas City.

== Tower tenants ==
KCTV is the only station broadcast from the tower. Though the studios of KCPT (Kansas City PBS) are at the base, it is not broadcast from this site.

== See also ==
- Lattice tower
- List of tallest towers in the world
- List of tallest freestanding structures in the world
- List of tallest freestanding steel structures
- List of famous transmission sites

Records
Preceded by Eiffel Tower	World's tallest free-standing tower 1956-1957	Succeeded by Eiffel Tower
