= WHDH-TV tower =

Transmitter located in Newton, Massachusetts

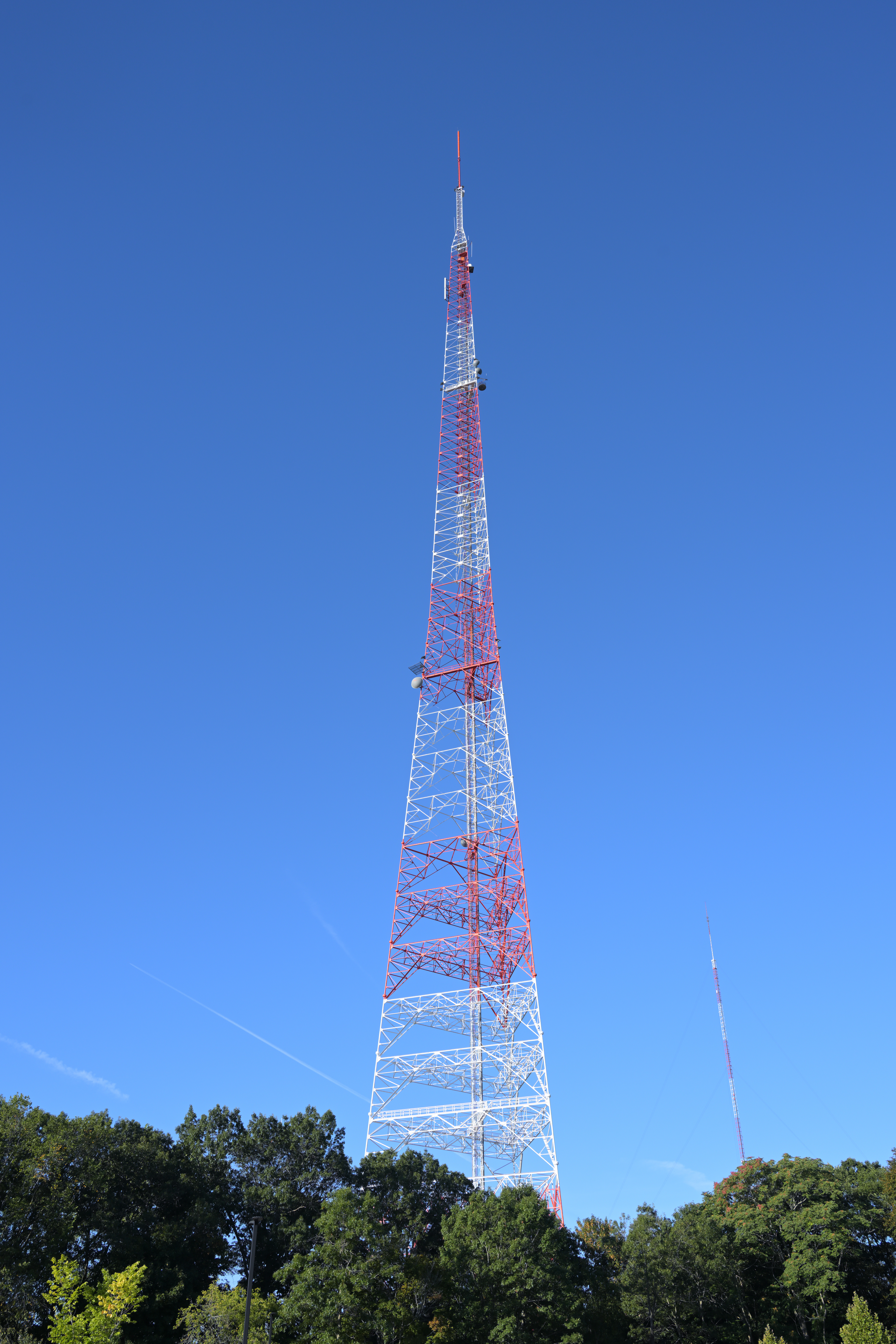
- WHDH-TV tower in 2025, with WBZ-TV tower in the background to the right

- Location within the United States

General information
- Status: Completed
- Type: Steel lattice television tower
- Location: Newton Upper Falls section of Newton, Massachusetts
- Coordinates: 42°18′41″N 71°12′58″W
- Completed: 1960

Height
- Height: 323.8 m (1,062 ft)

The WHDH-TV tower is a free-standing lattice tower with a triangular cross section located in the Newton Upper Falls section of Newton, Massachusetts. It was built in 1960 by RKO General and is currently owned by Sunbeam Television, which uses it to transmit its Boston television stations, WHDH (channel 7) and WLVI (channel 56), which shares WHDH's channel spectrum. It was originally built for RKO-owned WNAC-TV, the original occupant of channel 7, until it surrendered its license in May 1982 due to long-standing issues with its parent company, when the tower and studio assets were transferred to the new channel 7 licensee.

The tower stands 323.8 m (1,062 ft) tall and would have been the third tallest free-standing tower in the world at the time of its construction after Tokyo Tower and the Eiffel Tower. It is currently the second tallest free-standing lattice tower in the United States after the WITI TV Tower in Milwaukee and the 11th tallest in the world.

== See also ==
- List of tallest towers in the world
- List of tallest freestanding structures in the world
- List of tallest freestanding steel structures
