= Mass media in Cincinnati =

The Cincinnati metropolitan area is a large, three-state media market centered on Cincinnati, Ohio, slightly overlapping the Dayton media market to the north. The Cincinnati market is served by one daily newspaper, The Cincinnati Enquirer, and a variety of weekly and monthly print publications. The area is home to 12 television stations and numerous radio stations. The E. W. Scripps Company was founded in Cincinnati as a newspaper chain and remains there as a national television and radio broadcaster. The term "soap opera" originally referred to Cincinnati-based Procter & Gamble, which created some of the first programs in this genre.

== Print ==
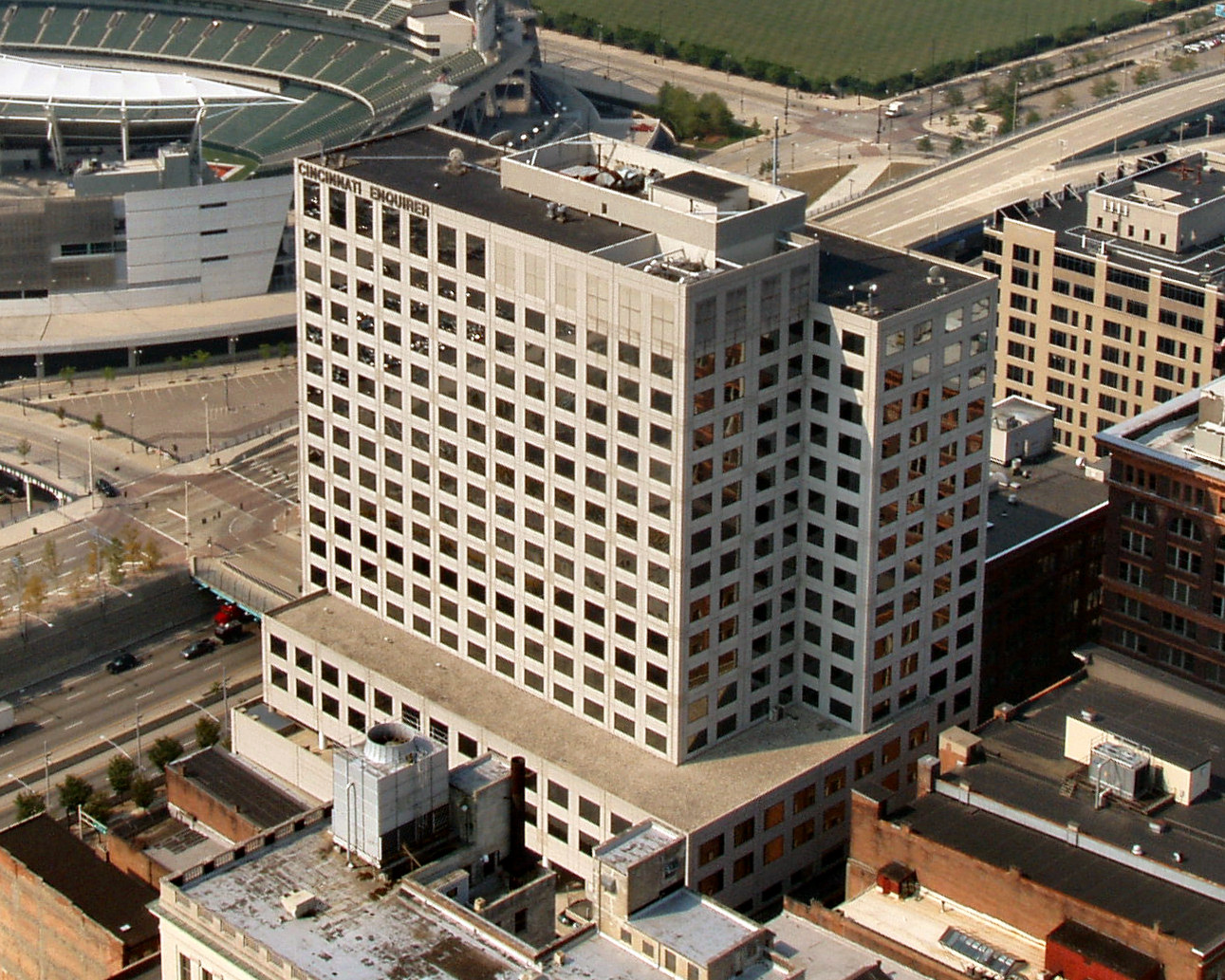
The Cincinnati Enquirer's headquarters building

=== Daily ===
- The Cincinnati Enquirer (known as The Kentucky Enquirer in Northern Kentucky)

=== Weekly ===
- Cincinnati Business Courier
- Cincinnati CityBeat
- Journal-News Pulse
- La Jornada Latina
- The American Israelite
- The Cincinnati Herald
- The Miami Student (biweekly)
- The News Record (thrice-weekly)
- The Northerner
- Xavier Newswire

=== Monthly ===
- Cincinnati
- The Catholic Telegraph

=== Suburban ===
- Journal-News

=== Defunct ===
- Fairfield Echo
- Hamilton JournalNews
- The Cincinnati Post (known as The Kentucky Post in Northern Kentucky)
- The Middletown Journal
- The Western Star

== Broadcast radio ==
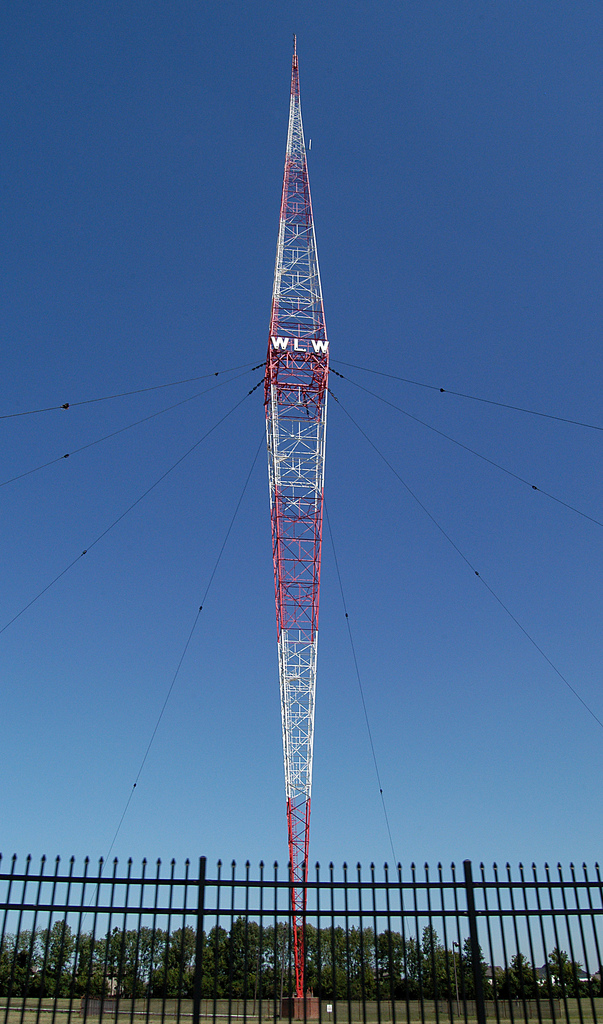
The WLW transmitter tower in Mason, Ohio, a distinctive diamond-shaped Blaw-Knox tower.

The 13-county Cincinnati metropolitan area (including Northern Kentucky and Southeast Indiana) is the 30th largest radio market in the United States, with an estimated 1.8 million listeners aged 12 and above as of September 2016. Of the market's 22 metered radio stations, iHeartMedia owns seven, Cumulus Media owns five, Hubbard Broadcasting owns four, Urban One owns three, and Cincinnati Public Radio owns two.

Currently, radio stations that primarily serve the Cincinnati metropolitan area include:

=== AM stations ===
- 550 WKRC Cincinnati (Conservative talk) ^{1}
- 700 WLW Cincinnati (Conservative talk / sports)^{1}
- 740 WNOP Newport, KY (Catholic-EWTN)
- 910 WPFB Middletown (Catholic-EWTN)
- 1050 WGRI Cincinnati (Gospel)
- 1160 WCVX Florence, KY (Christian)
- 1230 WDBZ Cincinnati (Urban talk)
- 1320 WCVG Covington, KY (Gospel/brokered)
- 1360 WSAI Cincinnati (Sports) ^{1}
- 1450 WMOH Hamilton (Conservative talk)
- 1480 WDJO Cincinnati (Oldies)
- 1530 WCKY Cincinnati (Sports)^{1}

^{1} Iheart station

=== FM stations ===
Asterisk (*) indicates a non-commercial (public radio/campus/educational) broadcast.

- 88.3 WAIF Cincinnati (Community/variety)*
- 88.9 WMWX Miamitown (Community/classic rock)*
- 89.1 WKCX Crittenden, KY (Christian)*
- 89.3 WMKV Reading (Adult standards/MOR)*
- 89.7 WYHH Highland Heights, KY (BBN)*
- 89.9 WLHS West Chester (Adult standards/MOR)*
- 90.1 WORI Harrison (Air1)*
- 90.9 WGUC Cincinnati (NPR/classical)*
- 90.9 HD-1 Radio Artifact Cincinnati (variety)*
- 90.9 HD-2 WGUC Jazz Cincinnati (NPR/jazz)*
- 90.9 HD-3 Inhailer Cincinnati (variety)*
- 91.7 WVXU Cincinnati (NPR/talk)*
- 91.7 HD-2 Radio Artifact Cincinnati (variety)*
- 92.5 WOFX-FM Cincinnati (Classic rock)
- 93.3 WAKW Cincinnati (Contemporary Christian)*
- 94.1 WNNF Cincinnati (Country)
- 94.9 WREW Fairfield (Adult contemporary)
- 95.7 WVQC-LP Cincinnati (LPFM/variety)*
- 96.5 WFTK Lebanon (Active rock)
- 97.3 WYGY Fort Thomas, KY (Country)
- 97.7 WKRP-FM Mason (Adult Hits-simulcast with WNKR)
- 98.5 WRRM Cincinnati (Adult contemporary)
- 99.1 WHKO Dayton (Country)
- 100.3 WOSL Norwood (Urban AC)
- 101.1 WIZF Erlanger, KY (Mainstream urban)
- 101.9 WKRQ Cincinnati (Contemporary hit radio)
- 102.7 WEBN Cincinnati (Mainstream rock)
- 103.5 WGRR Hamilton (Classic hits)
- 104.3 WNLT Delhi Hills (K-Love)*
- 105.1 WUBE-FM Cincinnati (Country)
- 105.9 WNKN Middletown (Classic country)
- 106.7 WNKR Williamstown (Adult Hits-simulcast with WOXY)
- 107.1 WKFS Milford (Contemporary hit radio)

=== Defunct ===
- WJVS/Cincinnati
- WLMH/Morrow
- WMH/Cincinnati (1921–23)
- WNSD/Cincinnati (1972–78)

== Television ==
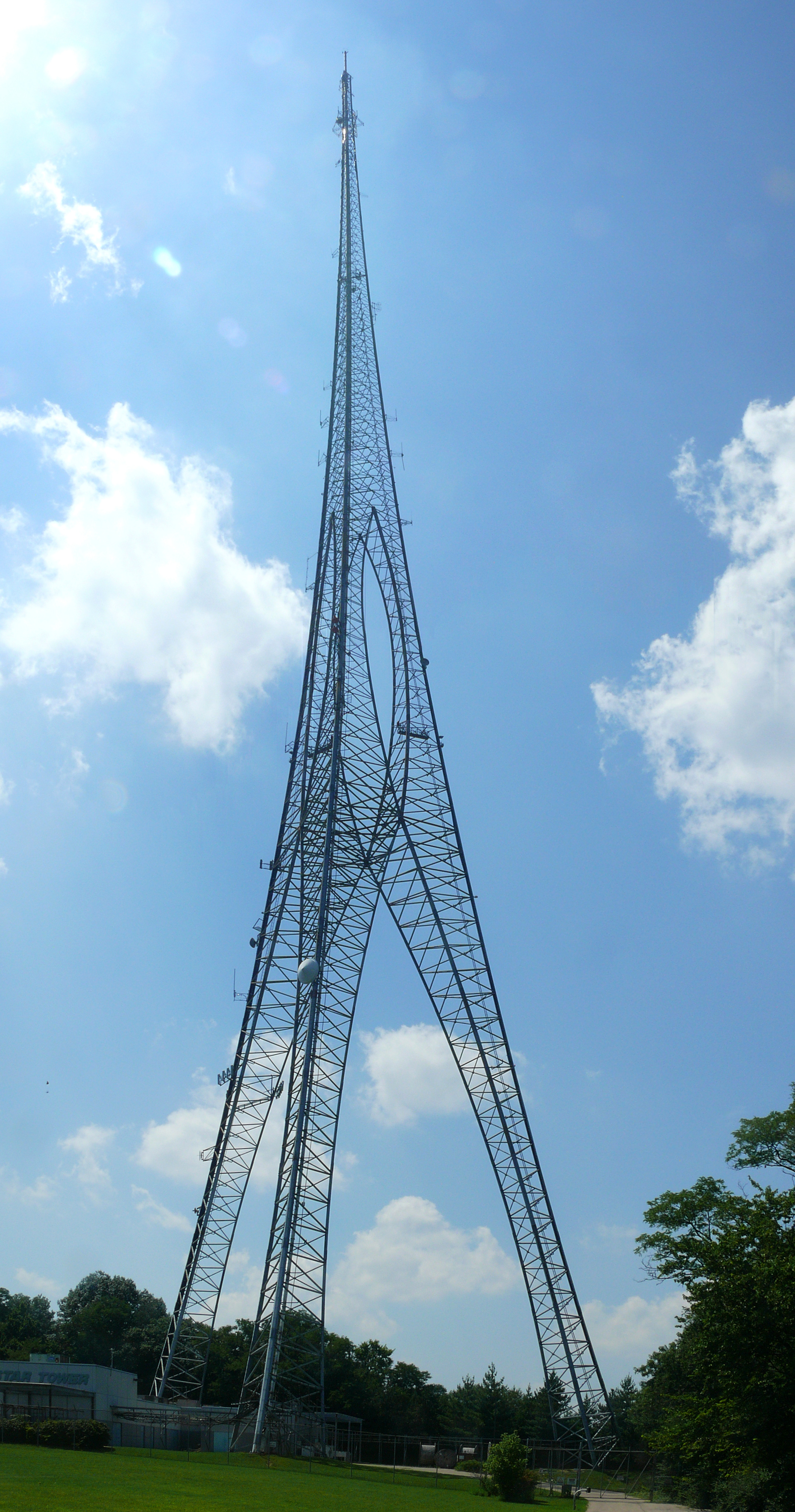
WSTR-TV "Star 64" and a number of radio stations broadcast from Star Tower, the 47th tallest tower in the world.

The 15-county Cincinnati metropolitan area (including Northern Kentucky and Southeast Indiana) is the 36th largest local television market in the United States, with an estimated 868,900 television-viewing households and cable penetration at 56.5% as of January 2016.

The Cincinnati market is served by the following television stations:

=== Broadcast ===
- 5 WLWT-TV Cincinnati (NBC) (Cable 5)
- 9 WCPO-TV Cincinnati (ABC) (Cable 9)
- 12 WKRC-TV Cincinnati (CBS) (Cable 12)
- 14 WPTO Oxford (PBS)
- 19 WXIX-TV Cincinnati (Fox) (Cable 3)
- 25 WBQC-LD Cincinnati (Telemundo)
- 36 WDYC-LD Cincinnati (Daystar)*
- 43 WKOI-TV Richmond, IN (Ion Television)*
- 48 WCET-TV Cincinnati (PBS) (Cable 13)
- 54 WCVN Covington, KY (KET)
- 64 WSTR-TV Cincinnati (MyNetworkTV) (Cable 11)

Asterisk (*) indicates channel is a network owned-and-operated station.

=== Cable ===
- FanDuel Sports Network Ohio
- Spectrum News 1 (Ohio)
- Spectrum News 1 (Kentucky)

=== Defunct ===
- WOTH-CD/Cincinnati (1998–2018)
- SportsChannel Cincinnati
- Spectrum Sports

Dayton television stations are also available over the air and on cable systems in Cincinnati's northern suburbs.

== Publishing companies ==
- CBD Media
- Franciscan Media
- Standard Publishing
