= WAQZ =

- United States
- Broadcast area: Cincinnati, Ohio
- Frequencies: 107.1 MHz (1991-1998); 97.3 MHz (2000-2006)
- Branding: Channel Z (1991-2003); New Rock 97.3 (2003-2005); Everything Alternative (2006)

Programming
- Format: Defunct (was Alternative rock)

Ownership
- Owner: Clear Channel (1991-1998); CBS Radio (2000-2006); Entercom Communications (2006)

History
- First air date: May 15, 1991 at 107.1 MHz; April 1, 2000 at 97.3 MHz; Ended on November 9, 2006
- Call sign meaning: WAQZ (Channel Z)

WAQZ was the alternative rock FM radio station in the Cincinnati, Ohio area for the most part of 15 years, from 1991 to 2006. Throughout its history, the station was broadcast at 107.1 FM from 1991 to 1998, and it was broadcast at 97.3 FM from 2000 to 2006.

The station was known as Channel Z from 1993 to 1998 and again from 2000 to 2003, New Rock 97.3 from 2003 to 2005, and finally 97.3 Everything Alternative in 2006. WAQZ went off the air on November 9, 2006, replaced by another alternative rock station, WSWD, from 2006 to 2009.

== Channel Z at 107.1 FM ==
The independently owned WOXY (97X), based in Oxford, Ohio, was the first alternative station in the region, as it launched in 1983. However, WOXY's signal did not serve the entire Cincinnati area, so some listeners could not pick up the signal. In the early 1990s, as bands like Nirvana, Pearl Jam, Stone Temple Pilots, and Green Day dominated the music scene, there was an increasing demand for a higher-powered alternative station to serve all of Greater Cincinnati.

In early 1993, Jacor Communications, now Clear Channel, would eventually answer this demand. In 1991, WRBZ changed its call letters to WAQZ. The station was called 'The Heat' and carried a satellite-fed top 40 format (there were no local jocks on air). Jacor Communications, who at the time also owned the market's long time album-oriented rock station WEBN, wanted to compete with new rival Z-Rock, at 96.5, a satellite-fed hard rock station based out of Dallas, TX. Jacor purchased the station in late 1991 and flipped formats to a locally programmed hard rock format. The name was changed to the 'Power Pig'. There were no on-air personalities, only voice overs and jocks from WEBN would do rock reports which would air occasionally. The voice-overs which aired often took aim at Z-Rock and jocks from other local stations, one being Mark Sebastion, who at the time was at Top 40 station Q102. Jacor would eventually succeed in its mission to wipe out competitor Z-Rock, as they went off the air in September 1992, switching to a country format, leaving the Power Pig the only hard rock station, other than sister WEBN. In the spring of 1993, in the wake of a changing music scene and the decline in popularity to the station's hair-metal rock format, Jacor flipped the format and the 'Power Pig' name and switched to a new alternative format called Channel Z.

According to Cincinnati CityBeat, Channel Z offered an "exciting lineup of real music and real music information." The tagline for Channel Z at 107.1 FM was "The New Music Revolution," and the station was centered on alternative music. This format lasted for seven years.

The alternative format on 107.1 FM was in trouble by 1998. On August 11, 1998, the format of WAQZ at 107.1 FM flipped from alternative to top 40. The station's on-air staff and announcers began referring to the station as simply 107 FM and acknowledged that the alternative format was discarded.

Finally, on September 29, 1998, at 5 PM eastern time, WAQZ at 107.1 FM played its last song, "Closing Time" by Semisonic. Immediately after the song ended, WAQZ became KISS 107 FM, with new call letters WKFS, and permanently switched to the top 40 format.

== Channel Z at 97.3 FM ==
Throughout the rest of 1998, 1999, and early 2000, Oxford's 97X was again the only alternative music offering in the entire Greater Cincinnati region, leaving many potential listeners of alternative music out of the signal's range.

On April 3, 2000, Infinity Broadcasting, now known as CBS Radio, picked up where Jacor Communications left off in 1998 by re-introducing WAQZ as Z97.3 at 97.3 FM, replacing the former classic rock station on that frequency, WYLX. Before the station debuted, "Bawitdaba" by Kid Rock was played continuously for about three days, as part of a stunt. Many fans around the Cincinnati area began referring to the station as the new Channel Z, and after a couple of weeks, the station officially changed its name from Z97.3 to Channel Z. The lineup of On-Air Talent during this time was Shea Maddox, "Smokin" Sean O'Brien, Jimmy "The Weasel", Kevin "The Stupid Intern" & Rick Jamie (Also Program Director).

Initial criticism of the new Channel Z targeted its primarily mainstream rock playlist, which included bands that were already being played on Cincinnati's mainstream rock station, WEBN, such as Linkin Park, Limp Bizkit, Staind, Nickelback, and Creed.

In 2001, WAQZ began broadcasting Howard Stern's morning radio show, which significantly increased its ratings. Later, the station would also pick up syndication of Loveline at night, which previously aired in Cincinnati on WEBN.

== New Rock 97.3 ==
On March 4, 2003, WAQZ received a new name, New Rock 97.3. The station also received a higher capacity broadcasting tower. Most of the on-air staff at the station survived the switch. The new name was chosen to place more focus on the frequency itself, allow the station to include "more cuts, and go deeper with artists," and put the format of the station in its name. All of these steps were taken to attract more listeners.

The early criticism of WAQZ, which targeted its mainstream rock playlist, was eventually addressed by Infinity Broadcasting in 2003 and 2004. At this time, more experimental bands such as Modest Mouse, Franz Ferdinand, and The Killers reached high rotation.

The format of WAQZ remained the same until December 16, 2005, when Howard Stern signed off from FM radio to make the move to Sirius Satellite Radio. After his final broadcast, WAQZ played "Train In Vain" by The Clash.

== 97.3 Everything Alternative ==
Immediately after "Train In Vain", WAQZ announced its new name, 97.3 Everything Alternative. The premise of the modified format was to have a "shuffle" of alternative music, similar to that of an iPod. Most of the on-air staff and music played on WAQZ remained the same. However, some deeper cuts and lesser known songs from the 1980s and 1990s were added to the existing playlist.

At the beginning of January 2006, WAQZ began syndicating Rover's Morning Glory to replace Howard Stern in the morning. Throughout the next eleven months, WAQZ continued to expand its on-air playlist and remained "on shuffle" for the most part, although it also featured live DJs, some requests, and countdown shows.

Despite the attempt to save WAQZ's alternative format with the "on shuffle" premise, the station ultimately could not survive. Some listeners predicted the demise of the format as early as 2005, when alternative stations in New York City, Philadelphia, Miami, Seattle, Baltimore, and Washington D.C. all switched to other formats.

For the alternative stations that remained, WAQZ included, Howard Stern's show may have been the only thing keeping the format on the air. As a 2005 article in Billboard Radio Monitor explained, "Infinity will likely flip more stations from alternative to another format to coincide with Howard Stern's January 2006 exit." Although WAQZ kept its alternative format through most of 2006, the end was approaching.

== The end of WAQZ ==
On August 21, 2006, Entercom Communications bought WAQZ, along with several other stations, from CBS Radio. On October 30, 2006, Entercom abruptly fired the entire on-air staff at WAQZ, including "Razor", Jimmy "The Weasel", "Notorious", Miss Sally, and others.

On November 2, 2006, Entercom's plans became clear. A new alternative station would launch at 94.9 FM, while WYGY would be moved to 97.3 FM. WYGY was formerly "The Star", located at 96.5 FM and owned by Cumulus Media, but was traded to Entercom in exchange for WGRR. Entercom would re-launch WYGY on 97.3 as "The Wolf", a top 40 country station, in order to appeal to a younger demographic than its other country station, WUBE ("B-105").

The final song to play on WAQZ was "The Only Difference Between Martyrdom And Suicide Is Press Coverage" by Panic! at the Disco, on November 9, 2006, at 11:58 a.m. EST, then the frequency switched to its new country format, now known as WYGY. At this time, Cincinnati's new alternative radio station, WSWD, began broadcasting on 94.9 FM, and WAQZ came to an end.

== Subsequent related events ==
Approximately two years after WAQZ signed off, in November 2008, WSWD ("94.9 The Sound") and WYGY ("97.3 The Wolf") swapped frequencies, returning the alternative rock format to the 97.3 FM frequency that had been home to WAQZ. This event transformed WSWD into "97.3 The Sound," an alternative format station that remained on the air until May 2009 when it was replaced with WREW "Rewind 94.9," and WYGY "The Wolf" again returned to 97.3 FM.

Meanwhile, an active rock format station, WFTK ("96 Rock"), launched in the Cincinnati market in December 2007. Following the end of WSWD in May 2009, WTFK refined its format to lean more heavily toward the alternative rock that WSWD played. Similarly, one of the modern AC stations in Cincinnati relaunched itself in 2009 as WNNF ("Frequency 94.1") and began to lean toward an adult album alternative format, picking up the other half of WSWD's former playlist.

== See also ==
- WREW ("The Sound"), the alternative radio station in Cincinnati, Ohio, from 2006 until 2009
- WFTK ("96 Rock"), an active rock station in Cincinnati, since 2007, similar in some ways to WAQZ
- WOXY ("97X"), the alternative station from Oxford, Ohio, at 97.7 FM until 2004, and online since
- WYGY ("The Wolf"), the country station that replaced the 97.3 FM signal in 2006 and again in 2009
- WKFS ("KISS 107"), the top 40 station that has broadcast at 107.1 FM since 1998
- CBS Radio
- Entercom Communications
- Howard Stern
- Loveline
- Rover's Morning Glory
