= 2006 in English-language radio =

The year 2006 saw a number of significant events in radio broadcasting.

== Events ==
- Quad Cities' radio stations WKBF (1270 AM) and WHTS (98.9 FM), both owned by Mercury Broadcasting but operated by a joint sales agreement with Clear Channel Communications, are sold during the year. The sale of WKBF from Mercury to EMF Broadcasting is completed in late 2005, and in February the format switches from contemporary hit radio (which had been formatted at the frequency since 1987) to formatting Christian music as WKLU. WKBF, which had been broadcasting a progressive talk format, is sold to Quad Cities Media and switches to Christian talk in December.
- January 3 – The BJ Shea Morning Experience switches to KISW in Seattle, Washington, from the former FM Talk (now country) station KKWF.
- January 21 – Kix Brooks, one half of the country music superstar duo Brooks & Dunn, takes over as host of the long-running "American Country Countdown." He succeeds Bob Kingsley, who had left the program after 27 years a month earlier, and had since started a new program called "Bob Kingsley's Country Top 40." Kingsley's last show was December 24, 2005, and radio personality Michael Jay had served as interim host until Brooks' debut.
- Dial Global takes over operations of the Transtar 24-hour networks from Westwood One.
- June 13 – VNU Media, the publishers of Billboard, acquires Radio & Records. The following July 14 Billboard Radio Monitor will cease publication, followed by Radio & Records three weeks later on August 4. On August 11 both trades are merged into a "newly relaunched" R&R.
- June 14 – KKST/KEDG/Alexandria, Louisiana trade formatted to KKST as Urban leader as "Kiss 98.7" and KEDG as Adult contemporary leader as "Star 106.9".
- In September, Mediabase, associated with the original R&R for 19 years until their final issue (as an independent trade), begin publishing their chart listings in USA Today and in the following December debut their online website.
- November 7 – BBC radio airs the 15,000th episode of its (near) daily drama serial The Archers, begun in 1951.

== Debuts ==
- The Rhythmic Adult Contemporary branded MOViN makes it debut on 1 May, at KQMV/Seattle, Washington.
- Mike McConnell, launched into national syndication after several years at WLW on July 1.
- On August 17 KZLA/Los Angeles drops Country after 26 years and becomes the second station in the United States to pick up the Rhythmic AC "MOViN'" format as KMVN. The flip would leave Los Angeles without an FM Country station until March 2007 when KKGO fills the void.
- Nova M Radio, a progressive talk radio network featuring Mike Malloy. October 18.
- Greenstone Media, a female-oriented talk radio network
- Kevin Barrett begins hosting a twice-weekly talk show on Genesis Communications Network called The Dynamic Duo, and another talk show, hosted weekly on RBN, titled Truth Jihad Radio. The topic of both shows is mainly conspiracy theories surrounding the September 11, 2001 attacks.
- San Francisco/Oakland oldies station KFRC flipped to Rhythmic Adult Contemporary as "MOViN 99.7".
- November 9 – WAQZ in Cincinnati, Ohio flips to country music as WYGY "97.3 The Wolf".
- October 2 – KMVK in Fort Worth, Texas (formerly KOAI) begins their Rhythmic Adult Contemporary format as MOViN 107.5. This change has caused a lot of criticism to former KOAI listeners.
- December 30 – "Casey Kasem's American Top 40 – The 1970s", digitally remastered airings of selected "American Top 40" shows from 1970 to 1979.

== Closings ==
- May – Unforgettable Favorites merged into Timeless Classics by owner ABC Radio.
- June 23 – The Phil Hendrie Show, host Phil Hendrie decided to retire from radio in an effort to pursue an acting career. Reruns continued on two stations until 2007.
- September 1 – John Batchelor's last show on ABC Radio Network
- December 5 – Springer on the Radio, hosted by Jerry Springer ends
- The Majority Report. Originally one of Air America Radio's featured programs, the show ended a few days after Janeane Garofalo left the show and the network. Later restructuring of the schedule saw her co-host, Sam Seder, move to early mornings.
- October 2 – KOAI in Fort Worth, Texas has ended their Smooth Jazz format. (see KMVK in Debuts section)

== Deaths ==
- January 9 – Jack Snow, 62, former National Football League player and radio announcer (complications from a staph infection)
- February 1
  - Dick Bass, 68, American pro football player and radio analyst.
  - Dick Brooks, 63, American NASCAR race car driver and radio broadcaster (heart attack)
  - Ernest Dudley, 97, British novelist, journalist, screenwriter, actor, radio broadcaster.
- February 3
  - Al Lewis, 82, American actor (Grandpa Munster on The Munsters), Green Party political candidate, restaurateur, and radio host.
- February 27 – Linda Smith, 48, English comedian.
- March 1 – Harry Browne, 72, American libertarian writer, politician, U.S. Presidential candidate and radio talk show host.
- June 26 – Stan Torgerson, 82, radio announcer for Ole Miss football and basketball games.
- July 4 – John Hinde, 92, Australian film reviewer and journalist.
- July 31 – Paul Eells, 70, voice of the Arkansas Razorbacks football and basketball for radio and television, car accident.
- August 2 – Robert Eric Wone, 32, American general counsel to Radio Free Asia (stabbing).
- August 25 – Ross Warneke, 54, Australian television commentator and radio broadcaster (cancer).
- September 6 – Sir John Drummond, 71, former controller of BBC Radio 3 and The Proms.
- September 26
  - Ralph Story, 86, American radio broadcaster and television show host (The $64,000 Challenge), emphysema.
  - Iva Toguri D'Aquino, 90, Japanese American broadcaster
- September 28 – George Balzer, 91, wrote for Jack Benny's radio and TV shows, natural causes.
- October 3 – Gwen Meredith, 98, Australian writer of all 5,795 episodes of the long-running radio serial Blue Hills, after heart trouble.
- October 5 – Robert Dentith, 29, British radio presenter of "The Unsigned Show" on Kerrang! Radio.
- October 13 – Bob Lassiter, 61, American talk radio personality.
- October 16 – Lister Sinclair, 85, Canadian playwright and CBC broadcaster (pulmonary embolism)
- October 17 – Christopher Glenn, 68, American CBS News radio and television news anchor, liver cancer.
- October 20 – Mary Gay Taylor, 71, radio journalist for WCBS-AM.
- October 21
  - Pye Chamberlayne, 68, American radio journalist (heart attack).
  - Paul Walters, 59, BBC radio and TV producer.
- November 23 – Nick Clarke, 58, BBC Radio 4 presenter and journalist (cancer).
- November 27
  - Casey Coleman, 55, Cleveland sports broadcaster who won 4 Emmy Awards (pancreatic cancer).
  - Alan "Fluff" Freeman, 79, former BBC Radio DJ, natural causes.
  - Larry Henderson, 89, first regular broadcaster on CBC's The National, natural causes.
- December 17 - Scott Mateer, 46, American Grammy-nominated songwriter and DJ (complications of diabetes and high blood pressure).
- December 18
  - Mike Dickin, 63, British Talksport radio presenter (car accident).
  - Mavor Moore, 87, Canadian writer, actor, radio & TV producer and founder of theatrical institutions.
- date unknown
  - Steve Crosno, 66, longtime El Paso radio DJ whose career spanned nearly 50 years (kidney failure).
  - Jaye Michael Davis, 62, veteran U.S. radio deejay (motorcycle accident).
  - George Edwards, 87, American radio host for WQXR.
  - Len "Boom" Goldberg, 74, longtime station voice and DJ for WMMS in Cleveland, Ohio, and the first station voice for New York City's WHTZ "Z100" upon their 1983 launch, heart attack.
  - Dick Johnson, 69, veteran Maine radio broadcaster and news reporter, complications of a heart attack.
  - Don Lunn, 72, Australian breakfast radio DJ.
  - Michael Vestey, 61, former BBC correspondent and radio critic on The Spectator magazine.
  - Neville Willoughby, 69, Jamaican radio broadcaster (car accident).
