= WSNL =

- Flint, Michigan; United States
- Frequency: 600 kHz
- Branding: Christian Talk AM 600 and 106.5 FM

Programming
- Format: Christian radio

Ownership
- Owner: Christian Broadcasting System, Ltd.
- Sister stations: WLCM; WCVX; WGRI; WJMM; WCGW; WLRT; WJIV

History
- First air date: April 26, 1946
- Former call signs: WFLM (1946–1947); WTCB (1947–1948); WTAC (1948–1997)
- Call sign meaning: "Michigan's salt and light"

Technical information
- Licensing authority: FCC
- Facility ID: 42078
- Class: B
- Power: 440 watts (day); 250 watts (night)
- Transmitter coordinates: 42°54′27″N 83°50′07″W
- Translator: 106.5 W293CA (Flint)

Links
- Public license information: Public file; LMS
- Webcast: Listen live
- Website: www.wsnlradio.com

WSNL (600 AM) is a commercial radio station licensed to Flint, Michigan, United States. It is owned by the Christian Broadcasting System and broadcasts a Christian radio format with assorted conservative talk shows and southern gospel, known as "Christian Talk AM 600 and 106.5 FM". The studios and offices are on Saginaw Street in Flint.

The transmitter, which is a directional antenna system (three towers day and two towers at night), from a site on Morrish Road at Grand Blanc Road in Gaines Township, Michigan. Programming is also heard on 250-watt FM translator W293CA at 106.5 MHz in Flint.

== History ==
The station first signed on the air on April 26, 1946. The original call sign was WFLM, standing for Flint, Michigan. The station was purchased in December 1946 by George W. Trendle and H. Allen Campbell, who changed the call letters to WTCB and made the station into Flint's NBC Radio Network affiliate. WTCB carried NBC's dramas, comedies, news, sports, soap operas, game shows and big band broadcasts during the "Golden Age of Radio".

The call sign changed to WTAC October 13, 1948. It was still under Trendle and Campbell's ownership. WTAC popularly stood for "The Auto City", referring to Chevrolet and Buick plants formerly located in Flint, but the call letters actually stood for Trendle and Campbell.

Trendle and Campbell sold WTAC to a Hawaii-based group in 1954. Under the ownership of Radio Hawaii, Inc., WTAC shed its NBC affiliation to become one of Michigan's first Top 40 music stations in 1956. Its original program director was Mike Joseph, who would launch the legendary WKNR "Keener 13" in Detroit in 1963 and later went on to create the Hot Hits format in the early 1970s.

J.P. McCarthy, later an institution in morning drive time radio for decades at WJR in Detroit, was WTAC's original Top 40 nighttime disc jockey in 1956. The station was also owned for a time by the Chess brothers, who owned and operated Chess Records. Chess sold the station in 1961 to a Philadelphia group that included Gene Milner who became manager of the station.

During WTAC run as a Top 40 rock station, WTAC's engineer was Robert "Bob" Garner, who said he hated rock music except for Chuck Berry's "My Ding-a-Ling." In its final years as a Top 40, WTAC helped introduce the Australian heavy metal band AC/DC to American audiences.

"The Big 600" flourished as a Top 40 contemporary station during the 1960s and 1970s. But by the 1980s, most listeners to contemporary music had switched to FM stations. WTAC flipped to a full service, country music format in 1981. The country sound lasted more than a decade, but again, country listeners began to tune to FM stations for their music.

Starting in 1989, through the mid-1990s, WTAC operated as a contemporary Christian music station. The WTAC call letters are now used on Smile FM's 89.7 FM signal in the Flint area. Christian Broadcasting System purchased the station in 1993. Its format was "CCM" for a few more years, with the slogan "Music and Ministry". The call sign change to WSNL, and a move to a spoken word format, would come in 1997. In 2014, WSNL added an FM translator station at 106.5 MHz, for listeners who prefer FM radio.

The station had been based in Grand Blanc Township for much of its early history. Its studios were located near the corner of Hill and Center Roads for decades until moving to South Saginaw Street in 2003.

== Translator ==
Call sign	Frequency	City of license	FID	ERP (W)	HAAT	Class	FCC info
W293CA	(106.5 MHz) FM	Flint, Michigan	139039	0.25 kW	0 m (0 ft)	D	LMS

== Sources ==
- Michiguide.com - WSNL History
