= WCGW =

- Nicholasville, Kentucky; United States
- Broadcast area: Lexington-Fayette
- Frequency: 770 kHz
- Branding: 770 AM 93.3 FM Southern Gospel

Programming
- Format: Southern Gospel / Christian Teaching and Talk

Ownership
- Owner: Christian Broadcasting System, Ltd.
- Sister stations: WJMM, WSNL, WCVX, WGRI, WJIV

History
- First air date: 1986

Technical information
- Licensing authority: FCC
- Facility ID: 43865
- Class: D
- Power: 1,000 watts day only
- Transmitter coordinates: 37°53′7″N 84°31′46″W
- Translator: 93.3 MHz - Lexington-Fayette

Links
- Public license information: Public file; LMS
- Website: http://www.wcgwam.com

WCGW (770 AM) is a Christian radio station licensed to Nicholasville, Kentucky serving all of Central Kentucky.

It broadcasts Southern gospel and country gospel music format.

WCGW leaves the air from sunset to sunrise to protect the nighttime skywave signal of WABC in New York City. WABC is a Class A station and its 770 AM is a United States clear-channel frequency.

== Translators ==
Call sign	Frequency	City of license	FID	ERP (W)	HAAT	Class	FCC info
W227CW	(93.3 MHz) FM	Lexington-Fayette	145363	99	0 m (0 ft)	D	LMS
