= WJMM-FM =

- Keene, Kentucky; United States
- Broadcast area: Lexington-Fayette
- Frequency: 99.1 MHz
- Branding: Life 99.1 FM WJMM

Programming
- Format: Christian talk and teaching

Ownership
- Owner: Christian Broadcasting System, Ltd.
- Sister stations: WCGW, WSNL, WCVX, WGRI, WJIV

History
- First air date: October 1973

Technical information
- Licensing authority: FCC
- Facility ID: 22085
- Class: A
- ERP: 2,100 watts
- HAAT: 170 meters
- Transmitter coordinates: 38°03′56″N 84°29′13″W

Links
- Public license information: Public file; LMS
- Webcast: Listen Live
- Website: wjmm.com

WJMM-FM (99.1 MHz) is a Christian radio station based in Lexington, Kentucky serving all of Central Kentucky.
