= WSWD =

WSWD may refer to:

- WSWD-LP, a low-power radio station (103.9 FM) licensed to serve Tifton, Georgia, United States
- WREW, a radio station (94.9 FM) licensed to serve Fairfield, Ohio, United States, which held the call sign WSWD from 2006 to 2008 and in 2009
