= WCNW =

- Fairfield, Ohio; United States
- Broadcast area: Cincinnati metropolitan area
- Frequency: 1560 kHz

Programming
- Format: Defunct

Ownership
- Owner: Vernon R. Baldwin, Inc.
- Sister stations: WMOH

History
- First air date: February 14, 1964
- Last air date: May 3, 2023
- Call sign meaning: "We're Country N Western"; "Without Christ Nothing Works" (backronym)

Technical information
- Licensing authority: FCC
- Facility ID: 69989
- Class: D
- Power: 5,000 watts days only; 1,000 watts critical hours
- Transmitter coordinates: 39°20′20.2″N 84°31′29.8″W

Links
- Public license information: Public file; LMS
- Website: wcnwradio.com

WCNW (1560 kHz) was an AM radio station broadcasting a Christian radio format, combining instructional religious shows with southern gospel music. Licensed to Fairfield, Ohio, it served the Cincinnati metropolitan area. The station was owned by Vernon R. Baldwin, Inc.

By day, WCNW transmitted with 5,000 watts. As 1560 AM is a clear channel frequency, to protect other stations on the frequency, the station was required to sign off at night. During critical hours, it transmitted with 1,000 watts.

== History ==
On February 14, 1964, WCNW first signed on the air. WCNW's call sign originally meant "We're Country N Western" when the station began broadcasting a country music format. There was previously a WCNW-FM on 94.9 MHz, which signed on in 1962. It has since been sold and is now known as WREW.

On May 3, 2023, WCNW signed off the air.

The Federal Communications Commission cancelled the station's license on May 6, 2024.
