= WOFX =

WOFX may refer to:

- WOFX (AM), a radio station (980 AM) licensed to Troy, New York, United States
- WOFX-FM, a radio station (92.5 FM) licensed to Cincinnati, Ohio, United States
