= WCFN =

WCFN may refer to:

- WOSL, a radio station (100.3 FM) licensed to Norwood, Ohio, United States, which held the call sign WCFN from 2012 to 2013
- WCIX, a television station (channel 13/PSIP 49) licensed to Springfield, Illinois, United States, which used the call sign WCFN from 1985 to 2011
