= 96 Rock =

96 Rock can refer to an American radio station:

- WBBB in Raleigh, North Carolina
- WFTK in Cincinnati, Ohio
- WKZP in Salisbury/Ocean City, Maryland
- WRDG Former longtime 96 Rock station in Atlanta, Georgia.
