= WDBZ =

Radio station in Cincinnati, Ohio

Coordinates: 39°06′50″N 84°29′32″W

- Cincinnati, Ohio; United States
- Broadcast area: Cincinnati metropolitan area
- Frequency: 1230 kHz
- Branding: The Buzz

Programming
- Language: English
- Format: Urban talk
- Affiliations: Premiere Networks

Ownership
- Owner: Urban One; (Blue Chip Broadcasting Licenses, Ltd)
- Sister stations: WIZF; WOSL

History
- First air date: 1924
- Former call signs: WFBE (1924–1935); WCPO (1935–1966); WUBE (1966–1981); WMLX (1981–1985); WDJO (1985–1990); WUBE (1990–2000)
- Former frequencies: 1330 kHz (1924–1926); 1290 kHz (1926–1927); 1220 kHz (1927–1928); 1200 kHz (1928–1941)
- Call sign meaning: The Buzz

Technical information
- Licensing authority: FCC
- Facility ID: 10139
- Class: C
- Power: 1,000 watts

Links
- Public license information: Public file; LMS
- Webcast: Listen live
- Website: thebuzzcincy.com

WDBZ (1230 AM) is a radio station serving Cincinnati, Ohio. The station mostly plays urban talk while also providing urban oldies and urban contemporary gospel music. Owned by Urban One, its studios are located at Centennial Plaza in Downtown Cincinnati and its transmitter site is in Eden Park.

== History ==
WDBZ is one of the oldest Cincinnati radio stations. The station was originally licensed on December 8, 1924, as WFBE, with 20 watts on 1330 kHz to John Van de Walle of the Van De Walle Music & Radio Co. at 208 West Second Street in Seymour, Indiana. The call letters were randomly assigned from a sequential roster of available call signs. In late 1926, the station moved to Cincinnati, now owned by the Garfield Place Hotel Co. (Robert A. Casey).

Following the establishment of the Federal Radio Commission (FRC), stations were initially issued a series of temporary authorizations starting on May 3, 1927. In addition, they were informed that if they wanted to continue operating, they needed to file a formal license application by January 15, 1928, as the first step in determining whether they met the new "public interest, convenience, or necessity" standard. On May 25, 1928, the FRC issued General Order 32, which notified 164 stations, including WFBE, that "From an examination of your application for future license it does not find that public interest, convenience, or necessity would be served by granting it." However, the station successfully convinced the commission that it should remain licensed.

On November 11, 1928, the FRC implemented a major reallocation of station transmitting frequencies, as part of a reorganization resulting from its implementation of General Order 40. WFBE was assigned to 1200 kHz, on a time-sharing basis with WKRC.

Scripps-Howard Newspapers (now the E. W. Scripps Company) purchased the station in October 1935, renaming it WCPO after The Cincinnati Post. (Scripps-Howard Broadcasting would later launch sister stations WCPO-TV and WCPO-FM.) In March 1941, most of the stations on 1200 kHz, including WCPO, moved to 1230 kHz, as part of the implementation of the North American Regional Broadcasting Agreement.

WCPO was Cincinnati's first top 40 station, and was in the format from 1956 until it was sold in 1966. WCPO encountered serious competition from the stronger WSAI when that station entered the Top 40 format in July 1961. WSAI broadcast with 5,000 watts day and night, while WCPO broadcast with 1,000 watts during the day and only 250 watts at night. Some of the DJs on WCPO in the 1960s included Shad O'Shea, Mike Gavin, Bob Keith, Mark Edwards, Gary Allyn, Ron Beach and Gary Cory.

Scripps-Howard sold the station to Kaye-Smith Broadcasting whose principals were entertainer Danny Kaye and business associate Lester Smith, in January 1966. On January 15, 1966, the station call letters were changed to WUBE, and almost the entire air staff was replaced. After another three-year run as a top 40 station under the direction of legendary programmer Bill Drake as "1-2-3-W-B", it became a country music-formatted station in April 1969. They operated the station along with their FM sister (which was renamed WUBE-FM), until the late 1970s, when they sold all their radio properties to Plough Broadcasting, then a part of the pharmaceutical company, Schering-Plough.

After partially simulcasting with its FM sister station for years, the station changed to a big band/nostalgia format in September 1981 using Al Hamm's syndicated "Music of Your Life" service and changed the call letters to WMLX.

In 1984, Schering-Plough divested its radio division and sold the 1230 AM and 105.1 FM frequencies (along with its other seven stations around the country) to DKM Broadcasting headed by former Cox Radio executive, James Wesley, and formed with the backing of investment firm DKM (Dyson Kissner-Moran), for the initial purpose of acquiring the Plough Broadcasting radio properties.

Until December 15, 1984, the 1230 AM frequency broadcast at 1,000 watts during the day and 250 watts at night, which made its nighttime audience reach extremely limited. On this date, the Federal Communications Commission (FCC) granted DKM the ability to broadcast the 1230 frequency at 1,000 watts 24 hours a day. Incidentally, for many years the 1230 frequency broadcast from a tower located on top of a 5-story building on the eastern edge of downtown Cincinnati and was partially inhibited by the hillside of Mount Adams, Ohio which rose right behind and to the east of the building. (The current tower site is in Eden Park on a former Cincinnati Police communications tower.)

On January 1, 1985, the call letters changed to WDJO and the station adopted an oldies format. In 1986, both WDJO and WUBE-FM were sold to American Media Inc.

On January 17, 1990, the station's format changed to a simulcast of sister country station WUBE-FM. The station held on to the WDJO call letters to keep them from going to another broadcaster who may have wanted to do an FM oldies format. (An FM oldies station did emerge that month as WGRR.) The WUBE call letters appeared on 1230 AM for the first time in almost ten years on March 16, 1990. During this time, the station aired a few seasons of Cincinnati Cyclones hockey and some other weekend sports programming separate from the FM. In 1991, American Media sold the stations to National Radio Partners, which eventually changed its name to Chancellor Media and was later known as AMFM Inc. AMFM eventually merged with Clear Channel Communications in 2000.

On December 29, 1994, 1230 AM became all-sports as "The Score". It swapped programming with sister station WKYN on March 25, 1996. (Despite the move, some Cincinnati Bengals play-by-play aired on 1230 at that time, as WUBE and WUBE-FM were the official flagship stations of the Bengals from 1997 to 1999.) After the move, WUBE aired a "modern standards"-based music format called "Retro Radio", but in January 1998, this was dropped in favor of returning to sports, simulcasting some programs with WBOB (the former WKYN) to make up for individual signal deficiencies on both stations. The stronger 1160 AM was known as "BOB", while 1230 AM was known as "BOB 2", in a vein similar to ESPN and ESPN2 cable networks. The station was sold to Blue Chip Broadcasting in 2000 as part of the AMFM/Clear Channel merger, while WBOB was sold to Salem Communications. In addition, sister WUBE-FM was sold to Infinity Broadcasting. Blue Chip then launched the "Buzz" format consisting of urban talk programs on August 23, 2000, and the call letters WDBZ were adopted at the same time. The format was changed to "Community and Inspiration" - a mix of talk and gospel music - in late 2008. The "Buzz" moniker was later dropped in favor of identifying using the WDBZ call letters. After a long local marketing agreement, Radio One took official ownership of WDBZ in 2007.

On December 4, 2015, WDBZ changed its format from talk to gospel, branded as "Praise 1230".

On January 5, 2017, WDBZ adopted sister WOSL's urban oldies format and rebranded as "Soul 101.5" (in reference to translator W268CM (101.5 FM)); concurrently, WOSL shifted to urban AC). With the change, Tom Joyner would move back to WDBZ to host mornings (as WOSL added Russ Parr in that timeslot), while WOSL midday personality Emanuel Livington was added for the same daypart on WDBZ, and Fredd E. Redd was added for afternoon drive.

On May 13, 2019, WDBZ changed its format back to urban talk and returned to the "Buzz" branding.
