= WQRT =

WQRT may refer to:

- WQRT-LP, a low-power radio station (99.1 FM) licensed to serve Indianapolis, Indiana, United States
- WCVX, a radio station (1160 AM) licensed to serve Florence, Kentucky, United States, which held the call sign WQRT from 2009 to 2013
- WQRS, a radio station (98.3 FM) licensed to serve Salamanca, New York, United States, which held the call sign WQRT from 1988 to 2006
