= B105 =

B105 or B-105 may refer to:

- B105 (Australia) (call sign: 4BBB), a Mainstream CHR radio station broadcasting out of Brisbane, Queensland, Australia
- B105, one of the B roads in Zone 1 of the Great Britain numbering scheme
- WUBE, a country music radio station broadcasting out of Cincinnati, Ohio, United States of America
- A model of Berkeley Cars made between 1959 and 1960
