= WIZF =

Radio station in Erlanger, Kentucky, serving Cincinnati, Ohio

Coordinates: 39.105°N 84.557°W

- Erlanger, Kentucky; United States
- Broadcast area: Cincinnati, Ohio
- Frequency: 101.1 MHz (HD Radio)
- Branding: 101.1 The Wiz

Programming
- Format: Mainstream urban
- Subchannels: HD2: Spanish variety "La Mega 101.5"

Ownership
- Owner: Urban One; (Blue Chip Broadcasting Licenses, Ltd.)
- Sister stations: WDBZ, WOSL

History
- First air date: 1965 (as WKKY-FM at 100.9)
- Former call signs: WKKY-FM (1965–1968); WHKK (1968–1985); WSAI-FM (1985–1986)
- Former frequencies: 100.9 MHz (1965–2006)
- Call sign meaning: A tribute to the Black musical and movie The Wiz

Technical information
- Licensing authority: FCC
- Facility ID: 5893
- Class: A
- ERP: 2,500 watts
- HAAT: 155 meters (509 ft)
- Translators: HD2: 101.5 W268CM (Cincinnati, Ohio)

Links
- Public license information: Public file; LMS
- Webcast: Listen Live; Listen Live (HD2)
- Website: wiznation.com cincinnati.lamegamedia.com (HD2)

WIZF (101.1 FM) is a mainstream urban radio station licensed to Erlanger, Kentucky, serving the Cincinnati area. The station is owned and operated by Urban One. It broadcasts with an effective radiated power of 2,500 watts. Its studios are located at Centennial Plaza in downtown Cincinnati, and the transmitter site is west of the downtown area.

== History ==
=== Early years ===
Ken Thomas, Inc., received a construction permit for a new FM radio station on 100.9 MHz in Erlanger, Kentucky, from the Federal Communications Commission on June 1, 1964. WKKY-FM signed on in September 1965, broadcasting a full-service format.

WKKY-FM was bought in late 1968 by the Christian Broadcasting Association, owners of WTOF in Canton; the call letters were changed to WHKK and a new format of religious programs instituted. The Christian Broadcasting Association also converted the station to 24-hour operation. Under its ownership, WHKK became known for its gospel music and its intensive public service programming, including an "unheard-of" four-hour news block in the evenings and local sports coverage. Airing some 160 high school games a year by the early 1980s, WHKK also became the exclusive Cincinnati-market home of Kentucky Wildcats football and the United States Football League.

On October 14, 1985, WHKK became WSAI-FM; the WSAI call letters, long a fixture in Cincinnati, had been abandoned by 1360 AM after that station had used them since 1923. Its owner, Mortenson Broadcasting, had grown to own stations elsewhere in Ohio, Kentucky, West Virginia and Maryland.

=== WIZF ===
1986 brought the biggest change in the history of the frequency when Inter-Urban Broadcasting Partnership Ltd. acquired WSAI-FM for $2 million. It was immediately apparent that WSAI-FM was about to flip to an urban contemporary format, given the other stations owned by Inter Urban, including WYLD-FM New Orleans and WZEN-FM in St. Louis; Cincinnati had two stations already in the format. Prep sports coverage previously heard on WSAI-FM migrated to two other northern Kentucky stations, WIOK and WTSJ.

WSAI-FM went silent on midnight on November 24 as the ownership transfer awaited consummation. The next day, a burglar broke into the studios in Erlanger and stole $8,200 of equipment, though the theft was said to not have an impact on operations by the new owner. After taking a delivery of its own studio equipment, WIZF "The Wiz" finally signed on January 24, 1987. The new station edged out one of its format competitors, WCIN, but was far behind the other, WBLZ (103.5 FM), in the first ratings survey. Despite the performance, it did result in the firing of morning host Allen Guess. Ratings continued to climb for WIZF and fall for the competition.

In August 1988, without authorization from the Federal Communications Commission, WIZF increased its power and antenna height, prompting the FCC to open a formal investigation and warn other broadcasters not to do the same without a construction permit. The move had been announced in an on-air stunt in which the staff started claiming that they would walk out unless they got a 40 percent raise. The station went silent on August 14 at 6 p.m., returning to the air six hours later with a message from Inter-Urban president James Hutchinson, who claimed that the demand had been settled and the jocks got their 40 percent. The next morning, the station promoted that the 40 percent was not a monetary increase, but rather a 40-foot height increase on their tower antennae, which raised suspicions at WBLZ. The station admitted the infraction after the investigation was opened; station manager Reggie Brown was fired.

Inter-Urban filed for bankruptcy in December 1991 after failing to come to a deal with its largest creditor, Barclays. The company continued to operate as a debtor-in-possession, but to satisfy $4 million of the claim by Barclays, a bankruptcy court approved the sale of WIZF in 1994 to Blue Chip Broadcast Company, which was owned by local minority investors including Procter & Gamble executive Ross Love and then-Ohio state treasurer Ken Blackwell. The chairman and president of Inter-Urban—which had hoped to retain the station and revitalize it—unsuccessfully objected to the buyer, claiming that venture capitalist John Wyant had installed an African American chairman to make the company appear to be minority owned, but then set onerous financial terms designed to eventually allow Wyant to buy the station outright. At the time of the sale, WIZF had moved into a tie for third place in the Cincinnati radio ratings.

While WIZF rated well, the new ownership stepped into a lacking situation, even though The Cincinnati Enquirer branded it a "sleeping giant" with a loyal following. The station had no full-time general manager and was lacking in other administrative areas. Blue Chip, which began expanding in 1995 with its purchase of two FM stations in Louisville, Kentucky, grew to 18 stations before Radio One acquired the company and almost all of its stations in 2001 in a $190 million transaction.

On July 14, 2006, WIZF changed frequencies from 100.9 FM to 101.1 FM. The move had been ordered by the FCC in 2005 as part of a proceeding that led to other frequency changes in Indiana, Ohio, and Kentucky. The principal outcome was that WIFE-FM 100.3 in Connersville, Indiana, could move 50 miles (80 km) east to Norwood, Ohio, and into the Cincinnati market; Radio One subsequently purchased the station, which is today WOSL.

WIZF was the Cincinnati affiliate of the Rickey Smiley Morning Show from 2016 to 2020. Previously, the station aired Russ Parr in mornings; Parr in turn replaced Doug Banks after Radio One opted not to renew the Banks contract in favor of its in-house Parr program. WIZF now carries "The Morning Hustle", syndicated from Atlanta sister station WHTA, in morning drive.

== WIZF-HD2 ==
On November 1, 2021, WIZF launched a Regional Mexican format on its HD2 subchannel, branded as "La Grande 101.5" (simulcast on translator 101.5 W268CM).

On October 1, 2024, WIZF-HD2 changed their format from Regional Mexican to Spanish variety, Branded as "La Mega 101.5".
