= WRRM =

Coordinates: 39.122°N 84.548°W

Cincinnati, Ohio; United States
- Broadcast area: Cincinnati metropolitan area
- Frequency: 98.5 MHz (HD Radio)
- Branding: Warm 98.5

Programming
- Format: Adult contemporary
- Affiliations: Compass Media Networks; Westwood One

Ownership
- Owner: Cumulus Media Inc.; (Radio License Holding SRC LLC)
- Sister stations: WFTK, WGRR, WNNF, WOFX-FM

History
- First air date: October 1, 1959 (as WAEF at 104.3)
- Former call signs: WAEF (1959–1972); WLQA (1972–1980)
- Former frequencies: 104.3 MHz (1959–1964)
- Call sign meaning: WaRRM

Technical information
- Licensing authority: FCC
- Facility ID: 3142
- Class: B
- ERP: 18,000 watts
- HAAT: 246 meters (807 ft)

Links
- Public license information: Public file; LMS
- Webcast: Listen Live
- Website: warm98.com

WRRM (98.5 FM) is a commercial radio station in Cincinnati, Ohio. The station is owned by Cumulus Media, broadcasting an adult contemporary radio format. For much of November and December, it switches to Christmas music. The studios and offices are located on Montgomery Road in North Cincinnati.

WRRM has an effective radiated power of 18,000 watts. The transmitter site is on Radcliff Drive in Cincinnati, near Mill Creek.

== History ==
=== Beautiful music ===
On October 1, 1959 the station signed on as WAEF, a beautiful music station at 104.3 FM. It played quarter hour sweeps of instrumental cover songs of pop hits, as well as Broadway and Hollywood show tunes. The station moved to 98.5 in 1964 and increased its power.

In 1972, the station was acquired by Susquehanna Broadcasting and switched its call sign to WLQA, still with "beautiful music". Over time, the station's audience was beginning to age; in response, WLQA increased the soft vocals and eased up on the instrumentals in an effort to attract younger listeners.

=== Soft AC ===
The station changed its call letters to WRRM and has used the identifier "Warm 98" since first switching to a soft adult contemporary format in late 1980. To ease the transition to "Warm 98", the station played many of the same songs as it did before, only now they would be performed by the original vocal artists instead of by "beautiful music" orchestras.

"Warm 98" was not just one of the first "soft hits" stations in the country, but among the few stations of the genre that has kept this format under the same call sign and identifier for more than four decades. "Warm 98" quickly became popular with women and Baby Boomers at a time when many of them wanted soft music but didn't care for instrumental easy listening. WRRM played the softer Top 40 hits of the last 20 years. Its initial playlist featured The Carpenters, Paul McCartney, Stevie Wonder, Fleetwood Mac and Dan Fogelberg. The office-friendly format proved to be a real ratings winner.

=== Move to Mainstream AC ===
In the early 2000s, WRRM dropped the 1970s titles from its playlist and added more current and upbeat songs from the Adult Contemporary chart, playing Maroon 5, Taylor Swift, Katy Perry, Bruno Mars, Rihanna and Ed Sheeran. The playlist also features songs from the 1980s and 90s from artists such as Billy Joel, Michael Jackson, Journey, Elton John, Whitney Houston and Rod Stewart.

The station's former frequency of 104.3 on the FM dial is now home to WNLT, a Contemporary Christian outlet broadcasting the K-Love network.

=== Past programming ===
For ten years, ending in February 2010, WRRM aired five hours of Smooth Jazz on Saturday nights hosted by midday personality Chris Lynn. The last time a Cincinnati FM station ran the Smooth Jazz format on a full-time basis was WVAE ("94.9 The Wave"), which ran from 1995 to 1999; however, the format had returned to the AM dial (albeit satellite-fed) on WCIN, but the station dropped it in May 2009, leaving the Cincinnati radio market without a smooth jazz outlet.

Sunday mornings featured the long-running "Sunday Morning Music Hall" hosted by Cincinnati Ballet Music Director Carmon DeLeone. The show first aired on Easter Sunday in 1991 and ended its 16½ year run on January 6, 2008.
