= WCVX =

Coordinates: 38°58′09″N 84°40′56″W

- Florence, Kentucky; United States
- Broadcast area: Cincinnati metropolitan area
- Frequency: 1160 kHz
- Branding: Christian Talk 1160

Programming
- Format: Christian radio
- Affiliations: Genesis Communications Network

Ownership
- Owner: Christian Broadcasting System Ltd.

History
- First air date: 1984
- Former call signs: WFKB (1984–1987); WMLX (1987–1993); WBND (1993–1995); WKYN (1995–1997); WBOB (1997–2006); WDJO (2006–2009); WQRT (2009–2013)
- Call sign meaning: Cincinnati's Voice for Christ (represented by the "X")

Technical information
- Licensing authority: FCC
- Facility ID: 35065
- Class: B
- Power: 5,000 watts day 990 watts night

Links
- Public license information: Public file; LMS
- Webcast: Listen live
- Website: www.christiantalk1160.com

WCVX (1160 AM) is a radio station licensed to Florence, Kentucky in the Cincinnati metropolitan area. WCVX is owned by the Christian Broadcasting System and it carries a Christian radio format. Its studios and offices are on West Seventh Street in Cincinnati and its transmitter is off Fowler Creek Road in Florence. WCVX broadcasts with a directional antenna with 5,000 watts in the daytime but at night it reduces power to 990 watts to protect KSL in Salt Lake City, the Class A Clear-channel station on 1160 kHz. WYLL in Chicago, Illinois is the only other full-time 50,000-watt station on 1160 AM, although it is a Class B station.

Hosts heard on WCVX include Dr. Charles Stanley, Joyce Meyer and Jim Daly.

== History ==
=== Early years ===
==== At 1180 AM ====
WCVX originally signed on in 1984 as WFKB 1180 AM, a 1,000-watt daytime-only station licensed to Florence, Kentucky. WFKB was required to sign off at sunset to protect WHAM in Rochester, New York which is the clear channel station on that frequency. WFKB was a full-service station which served northern Kentucky, and offered news every hour along with Middle of the Road or MOR music.

WFKB changed to a country music format by 1986, and was simulcast with WIOK-FM in Falmouth, Kentucky as an AM-FM combo. In 1987, WFKB was acquired by Amber Broadcasting. The format was changed to Adult standards or Nostalgia, and the call letters were changed to WMLX to reflect a former station in the media market that had done the same format.

In 1989, WMLX was acquired by Hoker Broadcasting, which also owned then-WOFX-FM at 94.9 MHz. The two stations were affiliated until 1992, when WOFX-FM was sold to Heritage Media. WMLX was then a stand-alone station, and was purchased in 1993 by KLM Communications, which was headed by Dr. Kenneth L. McDowell.

==== Move to 1160 ====
In February 1993, WMLX was granted Special Temporary Authority by the FCC to move to 1160 AM and broadcast 24 hours per day at 1,000 watts daytime power and 500 watts at night. Call letters were changed in March 1993 to WBND, to reflect the station's new identity as "The Blend." This format was an attempt to merge the very popular Nostalgia/Standards format with an Urban adult contemporary format, which had been KLM's original plan for the station.

An early attempt at a Saturday sports talk show was hosted by Cincinnati basketball legend Oscar Robertson. A Sunday jazz show was hosted by local musician Wilbert Longmire. By 1995, WBND had been sold to the owners of WNKR-FM in Dry Ridge, Kentucky and the call letters changed to WKYN to reflect an emphasis towards northern Kentucky news and sports.

The station's signal was eventually upgraded to 5000 watts daytime and 990 watts nighttime, with different directional patterns for day and night. From the station's new transmitter site near Union, Kentucky, WKYN was now directing more than 10,000 watts towards downtown Cincinnati during the day. At night, the power directed at Cincinnati was only 1,629 watts.

The lower power, coupled with typical nighttime AM skywave interference, caused the post-sunset signal to be listenable in limited areas of the market, mainly northern Kentucky and the western side of Cincinnati. (WCVX still uses this transmitter site with the same signal parameters.)

==== New owner, new format ====
Despite the nighttime limitations, the station's new, more powerful signal caught the attention of Chancellor Media, which owned 1230 WUBE, 105.1 WUBE-FM and 96.5 WYGY in Cincinnati. In 1995, WUBE had begun running a sports-talk format known as "1230 The Score."

Programming consisted of nationally syndicated "Imus in the Morning" and "The Fabulous Sports Babe" as well as a local afternoon show, and network programming from One-On-One Sports in the evening and on weekends. Chancellor purchased WKYN in 1996 and moved "The Score" to the more powerful WKYN signal.

While the new "Score" was much more powerful during the day, WKYN's nighttime signal was lacking (as noted above) in areas north of the Ohio River and east of downtown Cincinnati where WUBE had provided a strong signal.

=== WBOB ===
==== The home of the Bengals ====
At the conclusion of the 1996 NFL season, WKYN stunned the local radio and sports communities by winning the rights to be the official home of the Cincinnati Bengals football team for three seasons. The games would also be simulcast on powerhouse sister station WUBE-FM, the city's dominant Country station.

On Cincinnati Reds opening day in 1997, the station changed call letters to WBOB and became known as "1160 BOB." The station eventually dropped syndicated programming during the day, and ran a live and local sports talk format from 6:00 AM to 7:00 PM each weekday. There were also various live weekend shows. During this time, WUBE and WBOB became a sports combo, simulcasting some programs to make up for individual signal deficiencies. The stronger 1160 AM was known as "BOB", while 1230 AM was known as "BOB 2."

In 1999, WBOB's parent company - by then known as AMFM, Inc. - merged with Clear Channel Communications. Because Clear Channel already owned the maximum number of stations allowed in the Cincinnati market, WBOB was spun off to Salem Communications, along with sister station WYGY-FM (now WFTK and owned by Cumulus Media). WUBE (now WDBZ) was sold to Blue Chip Broadcasting, while WUBE-FM was sold to Infinity Broadcasting.

Bengals play-by-play then shifted to competing all-sports station "1360 Homer" WCKY and "92.5 The Fox" WOFX-FM, both of which were owned by Clear Channel. In addition, WLW would also carry the games once the Reds season ended, giving the network three flagship stations. Most of the WBOB hosts also made the transition to WCKY at this time, which is still the arrangement, even though WCKY now broadcasts at 1530 AM. As of September 2008, the FM simulcast for Bengals games was moved to WEBN-FM 102.7. (WOFX-FM has since been sold to Cumulus Media.)

==== The Salem years ====
In August 2000, WBOB was officially acquired by Salem Communications. Salem kept WBOB's sports talk format, but changed the emphasis from local sports to an ESPN Radio format. There was a local show in the afternoon featuring WBOB Program Director Doug Kidd and reporter Gregg Waddell. This show would eventually be cancelled in favor of ESPN programming.

A local midday program was introduced featuring WLWT-TV sportscaster Ken Broo and Waddell, but that show would also be short-lived. Another local program featured Cincinnati Business Courier columnist Andy Hemmer talking about the business of sports during his show, "The SportsTicker with Andy Hemmer."

In late 2003, Salem dropped ESPN from WBOB and flipped it to a talk radio format. It was programmed like most other Salem-owned talk stations, using the Salem Radio Network of talent such as Dennis Prager, Michael Medved, Hugh Hewitt, Bill Bennett and Mike Gallagher. In addition, other syndicated hosts aired on WBOB including Laura Ingraham and Bill O'Reilly.

In February 2006, Salem sold WBOB to Christian Broadcasting System and exited the market altogether in exchange for a station in Detroit. At that time, Alchemy Broadcasting became the lease holder of WBOB and changed the format to Oldies and the call letters to WDJO.

=== WDJO ===
The WDJO call sign was previously used by another oldies station on 1230 AM from 1985 to 1990 in the Cincinnati area which is now urban talker WDBZ. The format was flipped by then owner of the 1230AM frequency, DKM Broadcasting, based in Atlanta, GA, which also owned WUBE-FM and had recently acquired the stations from Plough Broadcasting in October, 1984. Previously the signal had featured a "Music of Your Life" big band format. The station launched WDJO on January 1, 1985. The press release said the station would "feature rock 'n roll oldies spanning the late 50's through the early 70's with heavy emphasis on the "explosive years" of 1964–1969. The 'O' in WDJO stood for 'oldies'. The 'DJ' implies that the format is live and vibrant, and will invite much listener involvement. In fact, the idea is for WDJO to bring back much of the excitement that is associated with rock radio's 'golden era' of the 60s, when it seemed a new 'super group' was born every day." The initial lineup of DJs were all local and at the same time the nighttime 1230 signal was increased from 250 watts to 1000 watts early in 1985.

The first Program Director of WDJO was Chuck Dees, who was hired from WQYX in Baton Rouge, LA and initially anchored the afternoon drive airshift.

The WDJO call sign was also used by 106.5 FM in Greenville, Ohio (Dayton market) when it aired a Jammin' Oldies format. That station is now WTKD.

==== 1160 and 1230 connections ====
The WMLX call letters and nostalgia format were originally on 1230 AM between 1981 and 1985. Those call letters and format would later appear in 1987 on 1180 AM, the predecessor to 1160 AM. The "Score" sports talk format was launched on 1230 AM in 1995, then moved to 1160 in 1996.

The WDJO call letters and Oldies format originally appeared on 1230 AM between 1985 and 1990. Those call letters and format are currently on 1480 AM. Robert Nolan owns and operates WDJO 1480 AM as Mustang Media.

== WDJO moves to AM 1480 ==
On May 18, 2009, WDJO announced a move to 1480 AM, the former WCIN which previously aired a smooth jazz format. As part of the move, both 1160 and 1480 began simulcasting the transition asking listeners by way of on-air promotional announcements by Charlie Van Dyke and the station's website to switch to 1480. On May 23, 2009, WDJO began its new branding "Oldies 1480." Until May 28, messages interrupted oldies music on the 1160 frequency, directing people to the 1480 frequency. Throughout May 28, a 30-minute infomercial for a dietary supplement was run over and over. On May 29, Christian programming and music began.

On May 26, 2009, Christian Broadcasting System, LTD filed a request for the WQRT call letters for their Florence, Kentucky station on 1160 AM.

On June 3, 2009, The Cincinnati Enquirer's John Kiesewetter reported that a conservative talk format featuring Laura Ingraham, Neal Boortz, Dave Ramsey and Dr. Laura Schlessinger would debut on 1160 AM on June 15, 2009. Coincidentally, 1160 AM was the original Cincinnati home of Laura Ingraham and Dave Ramsey when it was News/Talk WBOB in 2003.

== WQRT Real Talk 1160 ==
On June 15, 2009, the station's call letters changed to WQRT and a conservative talk format debuted. The station was briefly known as "Q-1160" and even registered a web address at www.q1160.com. After several hours on the air, the station's management realized that any use of the letter Q in the Cincinnati radio market was service marked by WKRQ 101.9 FM, which has been known as "Q102" for over 40 years. By the afternoon on June 15, the station had edited out the "Q-1160" reference in all imaging and had registered the new web domain www.realtalk1160.com. The station's primary image line was "Cincinnati's Real Talk 1160." The station's lineup was primarily from the 24-hour satellite feed of Talk Radio Network, as part of TRN's initiative to distribute its programming in bulk. It was also the home of former WLW host Andy Furman, who was on in the morning and in late afternoon.

As of December 13, 2010, WQRT cleared Dennis Miller, which replaced Dr. Laura, with the latter's move to Sirius XM Satellite Radio in 2011. WQRT is one of several stations that dropped the show early, before it ended terrestrial radio distribution.

On Wednesday January 2, 2013, WQRT let go its local on-air staff, after Dean Miuccio finished his "Cincinnality" morning show. Syndicated programming replaced the local content, and the station went dark after the Notre Dame football game on Monday January 7. On February 1, the station began its Christian radio format and WCVX call letters from 1050 AM, which is now known as Urban Gospel WGRI.
