= Pye Chamberlayne =

American journalist

Edward Pye Chamberlayne, Jr. (March 7, 1938 – October 21, 2006), known professionally as Pye Chamberlayne, was an American radio journalist who spent most of his career with UPI Audio, later known as the UPI Radio Network.

== Early life ==
Chamberlayne was born in Fredericksburg, Virginia. His father was the New York Herald Tribune bureau chief in Paris.

== Career ==
In 1960, Chamberlayne receiver a bachelor's degree in English from the University of Virginia. His first job in journalism was as a stringer for the Richmond News Leader. After graduating, he moved to Paris and worked for the Agence France-Presse.

Chamberlayne later returned to the United States and worked for The Associated Press in Milwaukee. From 1962 until 1966, he covered the White House for UPI Audio. He returned to the company in 1969 after a short break and worked there until his retirement in 1999.

Chamberlayne covered every American presidential election from 1964 to 1992, with his coverage of the 1972 election being featured in the non-fiction book The Boys on the Bus.

== Personal life ==
Chamberlayne and his wife had at least one son, Edward Pye Chamberlayne III, who served in the United States Army during the Iraq War. Chamberlayne died of a heart attack at his home on October 21, 2006.
