= WFTK =

Rock radio station in Lebanon–Cincinnati, Ohio

- Lebanon, Ohio; United States
- Broadcast area: Cincinnati metropolitan area
- Frequency: 96.5 MHz
- Branding: 96 Rock

Programming
- Format: Active rock

Ownership
- Owner: Cumulus Media Inc.; (Radio License Holding SRC LLC)
- Sister stations: WGRR; WNNF; WOFX-FM; WRRM

History
- First air date: 1958
- Former call signs: WQMS (1958–1974); WLWS (1974–1976); WSKS (1976–1986); WBVE (1986–1990); WZRQ (1990–1991); WZRZ (1991–1993); WYGY (1993–2006); WPRV (2006)
- Call sign meaning: Former "FM Talk" format

Technical information
- Licensing authority: FCC
- Facility ID: 10143
- Class: B
- ERP: 19,500 watts
- HAAT: 247 meters (810 ft)
- Transmitter coordinates: 39.353111°N 84.324944°W

Links
- Public license information: Public file; LMS
- Webcast: Listen live
- Website: purerock96.com

WFTK (96.5 MHz, "96 Rock") is a commercial FM radio station licensed to Lebanon, Ohio, and serving the Cincinnati metropolitan area. It is owned by Cumulus Media and broadcasts an active rock radio format, known as "Cincinnati's Pure Rock." The studios and offices are on Montgomery Road in North Cincinnati.

WFTK has an effective radiated power of 19,500 watts. The transmitter site is off Tylersville Road near U.S. Route 42 in Mason, Ohio.

== History ==
=== Early Years (1958–1977) ===
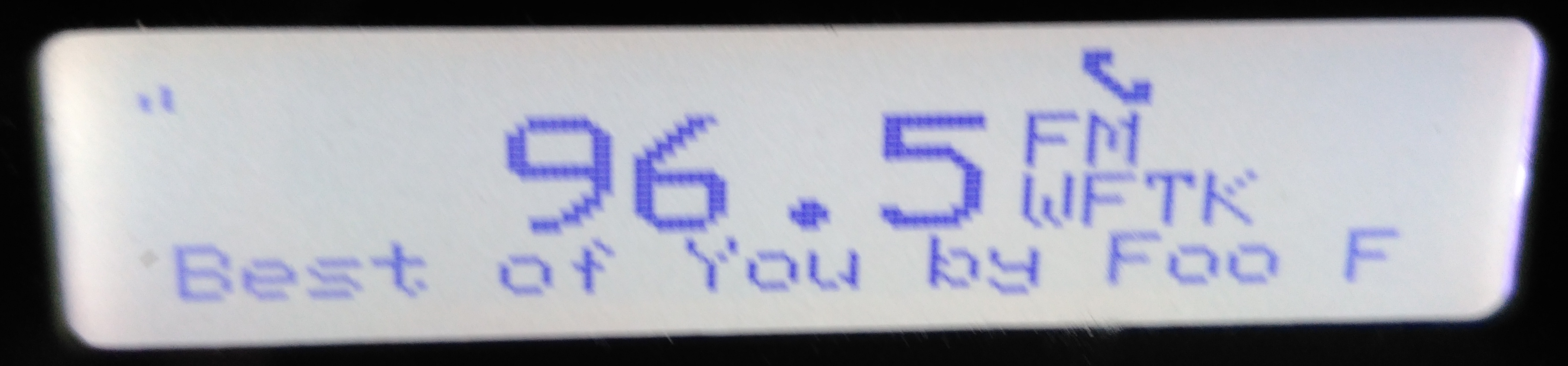
WFTK on a SPARC HD Radio with RDS.

The station began in 1958 as WQMS (which stood for "Quality Music Station"), playing beautiful music. In 1968, the station became a religious station and played contemporary Christian music. The station was originally licensed to Hamilton, Ohio, but the city of license was changed to Lebanon in a deal with Infinity Broadcasting in 2002.

=== Adult Contemporary (1977–1979) ===
After the station was sold in 1977, the station switched to an adult contemporary/Top 40 format under the call letters WLWS.

=== Top 40 (1979–1983) ===
In 1979, the format changed to Top 40 as "Kiss 96", using the call letters WSKS.

=== Rock (1983–1986) ===
By 1983, WSKS was playing a mix of classic rock and modern rock and changed their slogan to "96 Rock".

=== Country (1986–1991) ===
On September 29, 1986, the format switched again, this time to country as WBVE, "The Beaver."

=== Hard Rock (1991–1992) ===
In January 1991, Z Rock made its debut in the market with the WZRQ call letters, which were protested by crosstown CHR WKRQ. The call letters were then changed to WZRZ.

=== Country (1992–2006) ===
The country format returned on August 10, 1992, first as "The River 96.5", and then WYGY, "Young Country Y-96", on Christmas Eve of that year. "Y-96" was used as a flanker station to protect sister station WUBE, the heritage country station in Cincinnati. In 2000, the station was sold and the station's name was changed to "The New 96.5." In 2003, the name changed again to "Eagle 96.5", but due to a conflict with another station called "Eagle 99.3" in nearby Aurora, Indiana, the name was changed yet again to "96.5 The Star."

=== Talk (2006–2007) ===
The call letters WPRV were introduced in September 2006, when Cumulus Media sold the intellectual property and call letters of WMOJ ("Mojo 94.9") to Radio One, who moved the station to 100.3 FM. After the move, Cumulus launched WPRV at 94.9 FM, and temporarily used that frequency to simulcast WYGY. Cumulus would then trade the 94.9 FM frequency to Entercom in exchange for WGRR, so on November 2, 2006, the call letters WPRV were moved to 96.5 and "SuperTalk FM" was launched. The call letters were changed to WFTK on November 9.

WFTK's initial programming consisted solely of syndicated programs from Glenn Beck, Bill O'Reilly, Dave Ramsey, and Dennis Miller, in addition to the overnight feed from Sporting News Radio. Until the switch to 96 Rock, the station added more local, live personalities. Andy Furman (Furball) sports talk and starting October 1, 2007, the Two Angry Guys premiered with Tom Gamble and Richard Skinner. Previous syndicated shows Mancow's Morning Madhouse, Rusty Humphries and Phil Valentine were removed from the programing line up.

=== Rock (2007–present) ===
On December 13, 2007, at 10 a.m., after that day's Two Angry Guys, WFTK began stunting with construction sound effects. The station's website listed seven new format possibilities, each with an accompanying logo. All seven logos could be seen one at a time when the page was refreshed. The possibilities were Y96 ("Today's Best Country"), Rdnx96 ("Old-time mountain music"), WRAS96 ("Rasta and Reggae"), WWJD96 ("Christian"), ES96 ("Spanish"), D96 ("Disco"), G96 ("Alternative Lifestyle"), and WJOC96 ("Strictly Sports"). Also on the station's website, there was a countdown timer set for Noon the next day.

When the countdown timer on the station's website hit zero on December 14, the station flipped to active rock as "96 Rock, Cincinnati's Pure Rock". The first song played was Metallica's "Enter Sandman". The Two Angry Guys Show remained as 96 Rock's morning show. (In fact, 96 Rock's initial tagline of "Angry all morning, pissed all day" is a direct reference to the Two Angry Guys Show). All of the station's other airstaff, including afternoon host Andy Furman, were let go before the change, while all of the syndicated programs were discontinued.

WFTK was the 2007–08 flagship station for Miami University Men's Ice Hockey broadcasts. As well as the official radio station of the minor league hockey team the Cincinnati Cyclones during the 2007–08 season. Neither are part of the station's programming as of August 2008.

96 Rock's logo as an active rock station from 2007 to 2009

The active rock format lasted for only a year. In January 2009, the station segued to modern rock with the addition of artists such as MGMT, Bad Religion and Franz Ferdinand to the playlist. The shift to alternative caused WSWD to change formats on May 21, 2009, as its old "Sound" format was moved to 94.9 HD2 and the 97.3 frequency flipped formats back to country music, leaving WFTK as the only alternative station in Cincinnati. Ratings have since increased since the shift.

In February 2014, the station began adding more classic rock artists to its lineup, in an effort to "invite more people to the party" hoping to increase ratings. Bands such as Led Zeppelin, Van Halen, Whitesnake, AC/DC, and other classic rock artists were mixed in with the currents. The formula didn't work, as ratings did not increase.

The station dropped the classic rock tracks in July 2014, and went back to music from the 1990s to the present. However, the classic rock returned in November, only between the hours of 10:00 a.m. and 7:00 p.m.. In December, the station went back to playing two or three classic rock tracks 24 hours a day as they had done from February–July.

On September 2, 2014, the station dropped its local morning show in favor of the syndicated Free Beer and Hot Wings.

On January 5, 2015, Axel Lowe became the new program director, replacing Michael "Fin" Walter, who had been program director from January 2008 until the end of October 2014.

On January 19, 2015, the station became one of at least 30 Cumulus-owned stations that began airing Loveline in late nights. It did not air live; instead, the station aired the previous night's episode, from midnight until 2:00 a.m.. The show ended in April 2016. On May 2, WFTK replaced Loveline with the new syndicated rock show 2Hours with Matt Pinfield. The show airs from 10 p.m.-midnight Monday-Friday.

On July 1, 2015, WFTK posted an image on its Facebook page saying "You Spoke. We Listened. Monday Morning at 6am." On July 6, Free Beer and Hot Wings was dropped after ten months as the station's morning show. WFTK returned to a local morning show; known as 96ROCK Mornings with JD and Bridget.

More information: 2006 Cincinnati radio station reorganization.
