= Stan Torgerson =

American radio personality (1924–2006)

Stan Torgerson (May 25, 1924 – June 26, 2006) was the announcer of the Ole Miss Rebels for a total of 17 years.
