= WMOH =

- Hamilton, Ohio; United States
- Broadcast area: Cincinnati metropolitan area
- Frequency: 1450 kHz
- Branding: 1450 the Ticket

Programming
- Format: News/Sports Talk
- Affiliations: Westwood One Sports; Salem Radio Network; Townhall News; Columbus Blue Jackets Radio Network

Ownership
- Owner: Vernon R. Baldwin, Inc.

History
- First air date: August 15, 1944 (82 years ago)
- Call sign meaning: Middletown, Oxford, Hamilton

Technical information
- Licensing authority: FCC
- Facility ID: 65955
- Class: C
- Power: 1,000 watts unlimited
- Transmitter coordinates: 39°24′12.00″N 84°31′50.00″W

Links
- Public license information: Public file; LMS
- Webcast: Listen Live
- Website: wmoh.com

WMOH (1450 AM "The Ticket") is a commercial radio station in Hamilton, Ohio, serving the Cincinnati metropolitan area. It broadcasts a mixed news/talk and sports radio format and is owned by Vernon R. Baldwin, Inc.

WMOH broadcasts with 1,000 watts around the clock, using a non-directional antenna. The studios and transmitter are on Fairgrove Avenue in Hamilton.

== Programming ==
Weekdays begin with a local talk and information show with Chris Theiss and Steve Vaughn. That's followed by syndicated conservative talk shows from Hugh Hewitt, Dana Loesch, and Larry Elder, with a break at noon for Jim Rome's sports-oriented program. Late nights and weekends feature CBS Sports Radio programming.

AM 1450 is the flagship station for Miami Redhawks football and basketball, from the Ohio-based Miami University. WMOH is also the Cincinnati affiliate for the Columbus Blue Jackets hockey team and carries Butler County high school football and basketball games as well.

== History ==
On August 15, 1944, WMOH signed on the air. Its founder and original owner/operator was Fort Hamilton Broadcasting. WMOH added an FM station in 1959, now Cumulus Media-owned 103.5 WGRR. Both stations went to separate ownership in the 1970s. In the 1950s and 1960s, WMOH maintained a full service middle of the road format before switching to contemporary hits in the 1970s. Around the mid-1980s, the station moved to a mix of adult contemporary music, talk, and sports, until it eliminated the music in the 1990s, switching to all-sports.

The station had been Cincinnati's affiliate for ESPN Radio until July 2007, when ESPN switched to WSAI. WMOH has since become more of a mixed news and sports talk station, featuring talk shows from Salem Radio Network, Audacy, Inc., and Infinity Sports Network. WMOH serves as the flagship radio station for Miami (Ohio) University athletics and broadcasts local high school baseball, basketball, and football games. Since January 2008, WMOH has featured its own morning news and sports talk show, hosted by Chris Theiss and long-time WMOH employee Steve Vaughn.
