= WREW =

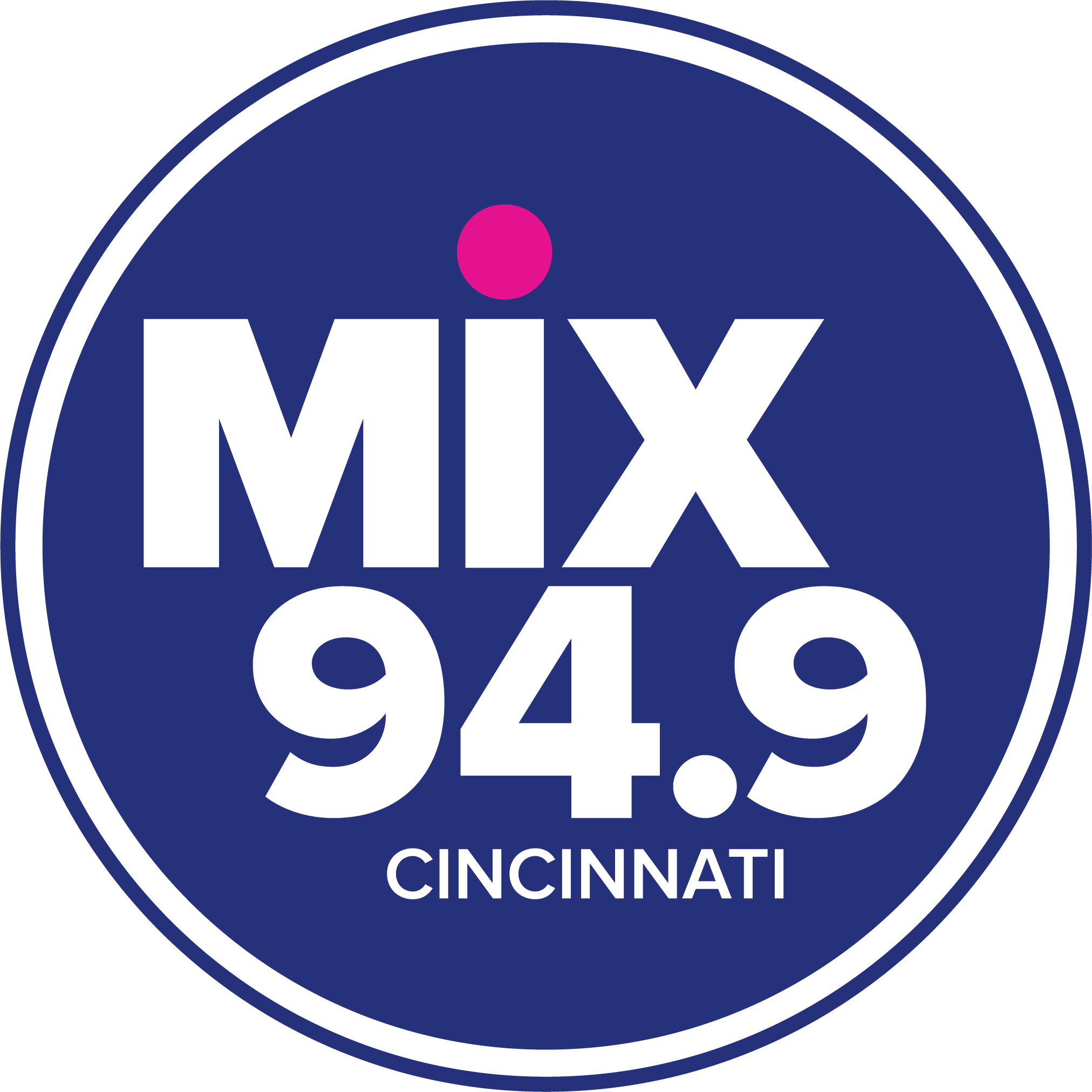
- Fairfield, Ohio; United States
- Broadcast area: Cincinnati metropolitan area
- Frequency: 94.9 MHz (HD Radio)
- Branding: Mix 94.9

Programming
- Format: Adult contemporary
- Subchannels: HD2: Alternative rock

Ownership
- Owner: Hubbard Broadcasting; (Cincinnati FCC License Sub, LLC)
- Sister stations: WKRQ; WUBE-FM; WYGY

History
- First air date: September 20, 1962
- Former call signs: WFOL-FM (1962–1965); WCNW-FM (1965–1975); WLVV-FM (1975–1980); WYYS (1980–1983); WLLT (1983–1988); WOFX (1988–1995); WVAE (1995–1999); WMOJ (1999–2006); WPRV (2006); WYGY (2006); WSWD (2006–2008); WYGY (2008–2009); WSWD (2009)
- Call sign meaning: Former "rewind" branding

Technical information
- Licensing authority: FCC
- Facility ID: 73369
- Class: B
- ERP: 10,500 watts
- HAAT: 322 meters (1,056 ft)
- Transmitter coordinates: 39°12′1″N 84°31′22″W

Links
- Public license information: Public file; LMS
- Webcast: Listen live
- Website: www.949cincinnati.com

WREW (94.9 MHz, "Mix 94.9") is a commercial FM radio station licensed to Fairfield, Ohio, and serving the Cincinnati metropolitan area. The station broadcasts an adult contemporary radio format and is owned by Hubbard Broadcasting. The studios and offices are on Kennedy Avenue, in the Oakley neighborhood of Cincinnati where they have been since August of 2021.

WREW has an effective radiated power (ERP) of 10,500 watts. The transmitter site is on West North Bend Road in Finneytown. WREW broadcasts using HD Radio technology. Its HD2 digital subchannel plays alternative rock music, and is branded as "The Sound."

== History ==
=== Beautiful music/Country (1962–1980) ===
On September 20, 1962, the station first signed on, using the call sign WFOL-FM. It aired a beautiful music format, playing quarter hour sweeps of instrumental cover songs of pop hits, as well as Broadway and Hollywood show tunes.

The call letters were switched to WCNW-FM in 1965, co-owned and simulcast with Country-formatted WCNW 1560 AM. Beautiful music returned to the frequency in the mid 1970s as WLVV-FM "Love 95."

=== Top 40/Soft rock (1980–1988) ===
The station was sold off to Heftel Broadcasting in 1980, becoming WYYS-FM "Yes 95" with a Top 40-Rock format. The format changed within a year to soft rock under the same call letters and handle before becoming WLLT-FM "95 W-Lite" in January 1983.

=== Classic rock (1988–1995) ===
On July 22, 1988, WOFX-FM "The Fox" replaced WLLT-FM, airing Classic rock.

=== Smooth jazz (1995–1999) ===
On September 13, 1995, the WOFX call letters, format and intellectual properties were bought by Jacor and moved to 92.5 FM, with 94.9 flipping to smooth jazz, branded as "The Wave." New WVAE-FM call letters took effect on October 2, 1995.

=== Rhythmic oldies (1999–2006) ===
On April 30, 1999, the station switched to a Rhythmic oldies format as "Mojo 94.9 FM" with the call sign WMOJ. That format remained on 94.9 FM until September 22, 2006, when Radio One acquired the intellectual property and call letters of the station from Cumulus Media, and moved it to 100.3 FM.

Cumulus then temporarily switched the 94.9 frequency to a simulcast of country-formatted WYGY as WPRV. (At the same time, Cumulus traded the station to Entercom in exchange for WGRR.) The simulcast lasted until November 7, when the station began stunting with an electronic countdown to noon on November 9.

=== Alternative (2006–2008) ===
On November 9, 2006, at 12 p.m., 94.9 FM flipped to alternative rock, branded as "The Sound". The first song on "The Sound" was "Welcome to Paradise" by Green Day. Although the station used the WYGY call letters for the first month of the new format, the call letters were moved to 97.3 FM, with the WSWD call letters debuting on November 29. (The country format would move to 97.3 FM at the same time as the flip.)

On January 18, 2007, Entercom announced plans to swap its entire Cincinnati radio cluster, including WSWD, together with three of its radio stations in Seattle, Washington, to Bonneville International in exchange for all three of Bonneville's FM stations in San Francisco, California and $1 million cash. In May 2007, Bonneville officially took over control of the Cincinnati stations through a time brokerage agreement. On March 14, 2008, Bonneville officially closed on the stations.

=== Country (2008–2009) ===
On November 7, 2008, at 11:00 a.m., the formats and call signs of WSWD and WYGY switched frequencies, with the country music format returning to the 94.9 FM frequency, and the alternative format moving to 97.3 FM. All weekday disc jockeys were also let go with the move.

The last song to play on "94.9 The Sound" was "The Only Difference Between Martyrdom and Suicide is Press Coverage" by Panic! at the Disco, which was also the same song that ended WAQZ at 97.3 FM nearly two years prior.

=== Adult hits (2009–2013) ===
Another shakeup occurred at 5 p.m. on May 21, 2009, as Bonneville moved the "Wolf" back to 97.3, discontinuing the "Sound" format altogether ("The Sound" would move to 97.3-HD2, which was later moved to 94.9-HD2). At the same time, 94.9 FM flipped to a hybrid adult hits/rhythmic adult contemporary format, branded as "Rewind 94.9." The first song on "Rewind" was "Hungry Like the Wolf" by Duran Duran. After re-acquiring the WSWD call letters on May 25, 94.9 would adopt new WREW call letters on June 2.

When WREW debuted, the station played a wide range of music from the 1970s, 1980s and 1990s, with a core focus on the 80s, as stated in their slogan, "Feel Good Favorites of the 80s and More". The station experienced huge success after its debut, as it is normally a Top 10 rated station in the Cincinnati Arbitron ratings.

On January 19, 2011, Bonneville International announced the sale of WREW and several other stations in various markets to Hubbard Broadcasting for $505 million. The sale was completed on April 29, 2011.

The station shifted to adult contemporary on September 6, 2011, by re-introducing music from the 2000 until today, while still playing retro hits.

=== Adult contemporary (2013–present) ===
On October 1, 2013, WREW rebranded as "The New 94.9, Cincinnati's Best Mix". On July 6, 2015, WREW rebranded as "Mix 94.9."

On January 18, 2018, WREW re-branded for several days as "Fiona 94.9" as a tribute to celebrate the Cincinnati Zoo and Botanical Garden's baby hippo, Fiona, on her first birthday. On January 21, the station switched back to "Mix" after the celebration wrapped up.

For much of November and December, WREW’s HD2 subchannel flips its alternative rock format to Christmas music, branded as “The Cincinnati Christmas Channel”.

== Former Logos ==
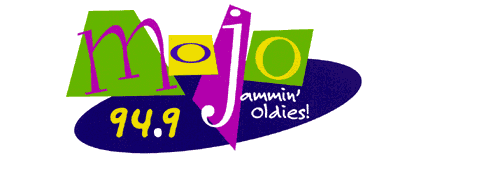
