= WOSL =

Radio station in Norwood-Cincinnati, Ohio

Coordinates: 39.122°N 84.548°W

- Norwood, Ohio; United States
- Broadcast area: Cincinnati, Ohio
- Frequency: 100.3 MHz (HD Radio)
- Branding: 100.3 Cincy's R&B Station

Programming
- Format: Urban oldies-leaning urban adult contemporary

Ownership
- Owner: Urban One; (Blue Chip Broadcasting Licenses, Ltd.)
- Sister stations: WDBZ, WIZF

History
- First air date: 1948 (as WCNB-FM)
- Former call signs: WCNB-FM (1948–1994); WIFE (1994–2006); WIFE-FM (2006); WMOJ-FM (2006–2012); WCFN (2012–2013)
- Call sign meaning: We're Old SchooL! (previous format)

Technical information
- Licensing authority: FCC
- Facility ID: 57353
- Class: A
- ERP: 3,100 watts
- HAAT: 141 meters (463 ft)

Links
- Public license information: Public file; LMS
- Webcast: Listen Live
- Website: rnbcincy.com

WOSL (100.3 FM) is a radio station licensed to Norwood, Ohio. The station is owned by Radio One, and airs an urban oldies-leaning urban adult contemporary format. Its studios are located at Centennial Plaza in Downtown Cincinnati and the transmitter site is west of the downtown area.

== History ==
The station began broadcasting on April 4, 1948, as WCNB-FM in Connersville, Indiana. It was owned by The News-Examiner Company, publisher of the Connersville News-Examiner. Studios were on the second floor of the News-Examiner Building, 406 Central Avenue in Connersville.

=== Mojo (2006–2012) ===
On September 2, 2006, Radio One, Inc. acquired the intellectual property and call letters of WMOJ-FM from Cumulus Media, and moved it from 94.9 FM to 100.3 FM. 100.3 had been moved into the Cincinnati market by Radio One, after it purchased the former WIFE-FM in Connersville, Indiana.

Cumulus retained ownership of the 94.9 FM frequency, and after the 2006 Cincinnati radio station reorganization in which the 94.9 frequency was traded to Entercom Communications, 94.9 FM is now the home of WREW "Mix 94.9", an adult contemporary station. That station is now operated by Hubbard Broadcasting.

While WMOJ was on the 94.9 frequency, it was branded "Mojo 94.9", and aired a rhythmic oldies format that appealed to both the black and white demographics. This station had very high ratings until its demise. After the station's move to 100.3 FM in 2006, the station took an urban adult contemporary format while retaining the "Mojo" branding and WMOJ call letters. WMOJ would also become the Cincinnati affiliate of the Tom Joyner Morning Show, which was simulcasted on WDBZ (who originally aired it by itself). On December 6, 2010, WMOJ shifted its format to rhythmic oldies, still under the "Mojo 100.3" branding. The first song after the relaunch was "Rock with You" by Michael Jackson.

=== The Fan (2012–2013) ===
On November 6, 2012, at 11:49 p.m., WMOJ began stunting with Christmas music as a prelude to a flip to CBS Sports Radio on January 2, 2013, branded as "Holiday 100.3". The final song on "Mojo" was "Caribbean Queen" by Billy Ocean, while the first song on "Holiday" was "Rockin' Around the Christmas Tree" by Brenda Lee. The station's call letters were changed to WCFN on November 14, 2012, to reflect the forthcoming format. The station, as "FM 100 The Fan", launched at 12:01 a.m. on January 2. The final song played on "Holiday" was "I Saw Mommy Kissing Santa Claus" by The Jackson 5. As of January 6, WCFN became the radio affiliate for road games and all playoff games of the Cincinnati Cyclones of the ECHL. WCFN was also the Cincinnati affiliate for Miami RedHawks men's basketball.

=== Old School (2013–2017) ===
Shortly before noon on July 30, 2013, WCFN changed its format to urban oldies, branded as "Old School 100.3". This ended the sports format after seven months due to low ratings—it received a 0.2 rating in its first month, and a 0.1 each month following until its demise. The call letters were changed to WOSL on August 15, 2013.

=== R&B (2017–present) ===
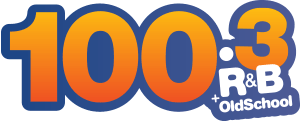
Previous logo

On January 5, 2017, WOSL shifted their format to Urban AC, and rebranded as "100.3 R&B." Concurrently, the urban oldies format moved to sister WDBZ. With the format adjustment, Russ Parr was added to mornings on WOSL, while Tom Joyner moved back to WDBZ to host mornings.
