= WNNF =

Country music radio station in Cincinnati

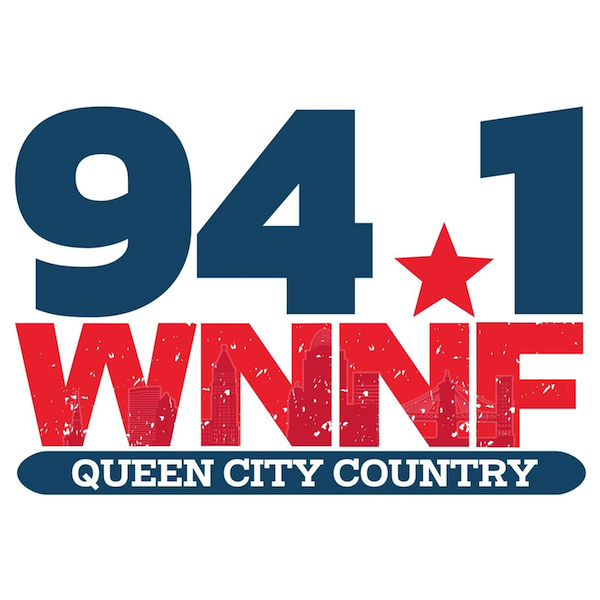
- Cincinnati, Ohio; United States
- Broadcast area: Cincinnati metropolitan area
- Frequency: 94.1 MHz (HD Radio)
- Branding: 94.1 WNNF Queen City Country

Programming
- Format: Country
- Affiliations: Westwood One

Ownership
- Owner: Cumulus Media; (Cumulus Licensing LLC)
- Sister stations: WFTK, WGRR, WOFX-FM, WRRM

History
- First air date: 1955 (as WSAI-FM)
- Former call signs: WSAI-FM (1955–1983); WKXF (1983–1985); WWNK (1985–1997); WVMX (1997–2007)
- Call sign meaning: "Ninety Four-One", from the station's branding as "Radio 94.1" 2007–2009

Technical information
- Licensing authority: FCC
- Facility ID: 59593
- Class: B
- ERP: 16,000 watts
- HAAT: 264 meters (866 ft)
- Transmitter coordinates: 39°6′59.00″N 84°30′7.00″W

Links
- Public license information: Public file; LMS
- Webcast: Listen Live
- Website: www.941wnnf.com

WNNF (94.1 FM, “94.1 WNNF Queen City Country”) is a commercial radio station in Cincinnati, Ohio. The station broadcasts a country music radio format and is owned by Cumulus Media. Its studios and offices are on Montgomery Road in Norwood, Ohio, with a Cincinnati address.

WNNF has an effective radiated power (ERP) of 16,000 watts. The transmitter site is on Highland Avenue at Interstate 71, northeast of Downtown Cincinnati, co-located with the tower used for WKRC-TV.

== History ==
=== Early years (1955-1970s) ===
The station signed on in 1955. In the early 1970s, it switched to a Top 40/Oldies format.

=== Rock (1976–1981) ===
In 1976, the station became WSAI-FM and played Rock n Roll.

=== Country (1981– August 1985) ===
In 1981, the station changed to a country format, and became WKXF ("Kix 94.1").

=== Top 40 (August - September 1985) ===
Briefly in late summer 1985, the station changed to a top 40 format calling itself K-Rock 94.

=== Adult contemporary (September 1985–1997) ===
In September 1985, the station switched to Adult Contemporary WWNK ("Wink 94.1").

=== Hot adult contemporary (1997–2006) ===
On September 19, 1997, WVMX ("Mix 94.1") made its debut with a hot adult contemporary format that was patterned after then-sister station WMVX in Cleveland. In 2006, the station started leaning towards Rhythmic AC after the station had begun carrying Whoopi Goldberg's Wake Up With Whoopi show.

=== Modern adult contemporary (2007–2009) ===
The station became "Radio 94.1" at noon on September 10, 2007, changed call letters to WNNF and dropped Goldberg's show as the station flipped to Modern AC. The first song on "Radio" was "Possession" by Sarah McLachlan. On August 1, 2008, then-owners Clear Channel put WNNF up for sale, along with sister station WOFX, to settle regulatory issues involved with the company's sale to private equity firms. On January 3, 2009, Cumulus Media was chosen as a buyer and swapped five of the company's radio stations in Wisconsin to make this transaction complete.

=== Adult album alternative (2009–2011) ===
On March 8, 2009, the station began calling itself "Renew 94.1", asking listeners' input on what path the station should take on its website. Later that month, it relaunched its format as "Frequency 94.1", but with a slight difference than what it was as "Radio". The station had a slight adult album alternative (AAA) lean, patterned from Cumulus's recently launched AAA stations in Houston and Nashville, which later evolved into a full-fledged AAA in late 2009, dropping most pop acts and leaving competitor WKRQ as the only hot AC station in Cincinnati. It was one of three commercial AAA stations in Ohio, the others being WNWV in Cleveland and WLKR-FM in Norwalk. The station's ratings began falling during this time.

=== Hot adult contemporary (2011–2012) ===
On May 18, 2011, at noon, after playing "Elderly Woman Behind the Counter in a Small Town" by Pearl Jam, WNNF began stunting with a "wheel of formats" that was predominantly classic country, oldies, all Michael Jackson, CHR, smooth jazz, urban oldies and urban AC, as well as playing news and history bits from Cincinnati history. The station promoted a new format that would be launched on May 20 at 9:41 AM. At exactly the promised time, the station flipped back to Hot AC as "Journey 94-1: 90's, 80's, & Now!" with a heavy emphasis on 1980s and 1990s music. The first song aired on "Journey" was "Don't Stop Believin'" by Journey. Throughout its run as "Journey", the station's ratings were not satisfactory, usually peaking below a 2 share (#18).

=== Country (2012–present) ===
On New Year's Day, 2012, at Noon, without warning, WNNF changed its format to country, branded as "Great Country 94.1". The final song on "Journey" was "I Gotta Feeling" by The Black Eyed Peas, while the first song on "Great Country" was "This Is Country Music" by Brad Paisley.

On February 7, 2014, at 5 p.m., after playing "Friday Night" by Eric Paslay, WNNF rebranded as "Nash FM 94.1", following a trend established by other Cumulus-owned country music stations. The first song on "Nash" was "Radio" by Darius Rucker.

On October 1, 2019, WNNF rebranded as "94.1 Cat Country" with no other changes to the schedule. The station's playlist also shifted to a model each hour where commercials play in a seven-minute block, with the remaining 53 minutes consisting of uninterrupted music.

In January 2022, WNNF added the syndicated “Kincaid and Dallas” morning show, and switched to a more gold-based country format under the slogan "Forever Country".

On May 1, 2025, WNNF dropped the "Cat Country 94.1" branding and rebranded as "94.1 WNNF Queen City Country".

== Other logos ==
Logo used from 1997 until September 2007 during the "Mix" era.

Logo used from September 2007 until March 2009.

Logo used from March 2009 until May 2011.

Logo used as "Journey 94.1" from May 2011 to January 2012.

Logo as Nash FM, January 2014 to October 2019.
