= WYGY =

Radio station in Fort Thomas, Kentucky

- Fort Thomas, Kentucky; United States
- Broadcast area: Cincinnati, Ohio
- Frequency: 97.3 MHz (HD Radio)
- Branding: 97.3 The Wolf

Programming
- Format: Country
- Subchannels: HD2: Classic country "The Neon Wolf"

Ownership
- Owner: Hubbard Broadcasting; (Cincinnati FCC License Sub, LLC)
- Sister stations: WKRQ, WUBE-FM, WREW

History
- First air date: 1993 (as WAAR)
- Former call signs: WSWD (2008–2009); WYGY (2006–2008); WAQZ (2000–2006); WYLX (1998–2000); WMMA (1993–1998); WAAR (4/1993-6/1993)

Technical information
- Licensing authority: FCC
- Facility ID: 40915
- Class: A
- ERP: 2,550 watts
- HAAT: 155 meters (509 ft)
- Transmitter coordinates: 39°12′1″N 84°31′22″W
- Repeater: 105.1 WUBE-HD3 (Cincinnati)

Links
- Public license information: Public file; LMS
- Webcast: Listen Live
- Website: theworldwidewolf.com

WYGY (97.3 FM, "The Wolf") is a radio station broadcasting a gold-based country music format. Licensed to the suburb of Fort Thomas, Kentucky, it serves the Cincinnati, Ohio metropolitan area. It first began broadcasting in 1993 under the call sign WAAR. The station is currently owned by Hubbard Broadcasting. Its studios have been located in the Oakley area of Cincinnati since August 2021, and the transmitter site is in Finneytown, Ohio.

== Station history ==
After being issued a construction permit with the initial call sign WAAR, the station changed their call sign to WMMA in June 1993, and would sign on April 18, 1994, with an oldies format. The station then flipped to classic rock as WYLX, "Alex 97.3", on October 16, 1997.

=== WAQZ ===
The WAQZ call sign and Alternative rock format abandoned by owner of 107.1 FM (Jacor Communications) was re-introduced by Infinity Broadcasting on 97.3 FM as "Channel Z" on April 3, 2000. On March 4, 2003, WAQZ was rebranded "New Rock 97.3" with a shift to more current modern rock artists. WAQZ was rebranded again on December 16, 2005 as 97.3 Everything Alternative.

On August 21, 2006, Entercom Communications bought WAQZ, along with several other stations, from CBS Radio (which Infinity was renamed as in December 2005). On October 30, 2006, Entercom abruptly fired the entire on-air staff, signaling the end of WAQZ.

=== "97.3 The Wolf" WYGY ===
On November 9, 2006, at noon, after playing "The Only Difference Between Martyrdom And Suicide Is Press Coverage" by Panic! at the Disco, Entercom moved WYGY's Country format to 97.3 FM and relaunched it as "The Wolf", this time as a top 40-styled country format, in order to appeal to a younger demographic than its other country station, WUBE-FM ("B-105"). (WYGY was formerly "The Star", located at 96.5 FM and owned by Cumulus Media, but was traded to Entercom in exchange for WGRR.) At the same time as the flip, Entercom relaunched the alternative rock format on 94.9 FM as "The Sound". The WAQZ call letters remained on 97.3 for a month until the WYGY calls were finally in place on November 29.

On January 18, 2007, Entercom announced plans to swap its entire Cincinnati radio cluster, including WSWD, together with three of its radio stations in Seattle, Washington, to Bonneville International in exchange for all three of Bonneville's FM stations in San Francisco, California and $1 million cash. In May 2007, Bonneville officially took over control of the Cincinnati stations through a time brokerage agreement. On March 14, 2008, Bonneville officially closed on the stations.

=== "97.3 The Sound" WSWD ===
On November 7, 2008, at 11 a.m., WSWD and WYGY switched frequencies, returning an alternative rock format to the 97.3 FM frequency, while the country format would move back to 94.9 FM. (The call letters between the two stations would switch four days later.)

=== "97.3 The Wolf" Returns ===
On May 21, 2009, at 5 p.m., Bonneville discontinued the "Sound" format altogether, with 97.3 FM re-adopting the country format and the "Wolf" moniker (at the same time, 94.9 FM flipped to 80s-leaning adult hits as "Rewind 94.9"). The last song on "The Sound" was No You Girls by Franz Ferdinand. (The Sound was moved to 94.9-HD2 and on the internet at thesoundcincinnati.com.)

On January 19, 2011, it was announced that Bonneville International would sell WYGY along with 16 other stations to Hubbard Broadcasting for $505 million. The sale was completed on April 29, 2011.

On December 6, 2018, Hubbard eliminated all the DJs on the station and began running jockless.
