= WGRR =

Radio station in Hamilton–Cincinnati, Ohio

Coordinates: 39.200°N 84.523°W

- Hamilton, Ohio; United States
- Broadcast area: Cincinnati metropolitan area
- Frequency: 103.5 MHz
- Branding: 103.5 WGRR

Programming
- Format: Classic hits
- Affiliations: Compass Media Networks; Premiere Networks

Ownership
- Owner: Cumulus Media; (Radio License Holding SRC LLC)
- Sister stations: WFTK, WNNF, WOFX, WRRM

History
- First air date: February 9, 1959; 67 years ago (as WHOH)
- Former call signs: WHOH (1959–1973); WYCH (1973–1978); WOKV (1978–1981); WBLZ (1981–1990)
- Call sign meaning: We're Great Rock and Roll!

Technical information
- Facility ID: 72126
- Class: B
- ERP: 11,000 watts
- HAAT: 316 meters (1,037 ft)

Links
- Webcast: Listen live; Listen live; Listen live (via iHeartRadio)
- Website: wgrr.com

WGRR (103.5 MHz) is a commercial FM radio station licensed to Hamilton, Ohio, and serving the Cincinnati metropolitan area. It broadcasts a classic hits radio format and is owned by Cumulus Media. Its studios and offices are on Montgomery Road in Norwood, Ohio, using a Cincinnati address.

WGRR has an effective radiated power (ERP) of 11,000 watts. Its transmitter is off West North Bend Road at Winton Road in Cincinnati.

== History ==
=== WHOH (1959–1973) ===
On February 9, 1959, the station signed on as WHOH, representing Hamilton, OHio. It was the FM sister station to WMOH 1450 AM, and was owned by Fort Hamilton Broadcasting. WHOH aired a blend of middle of the road and beautiful music through the 1960s and 70s.

=== Adult contemporary (1973–1979) ===
In 1973, the call sign was changed to WYCH and in 1978 to WOKV playing soft adult contemporary music.

=== Disco (1979–1981) ===
There was a format switch to all disco music in 1979. During this time, it was known as "The Chicken" in reference to its mascot, a giant whole broiled chicken dressed in seasonal clothing.

=== Rock/Rhythmic (1981–1990) ===
As disco lost steam in the 1980s, it switched briefly to a rock format as “Rock 104” in early 1981, only to switch again to Rhythmic Contemporary or "CHUrban" as WBLZ. WBLZ had a conservative playlist for a CHUrban formatted station.

WBLZ encountered competition when WSAI (previously WHKK), then on 100.9 FM, switched from a Christian radio format and went urban contemporary as WIZF in January 1987, known as "The Wiz." Despite WIZF's lower effective radiated power, WBLZ was unable to compete.

=== Oldies (1990–2007) ===
On January 4, 1990, the station became Cincinnati's first FM oldies station under the original moniker "Oldies 103.5."

WGRR was formerly owned by CBS Radio, and was sold to Entercom Communications on August 21, 2006, along with CBS Radio's other Cincinnati stations. Entercom (which later exited the market) then traded the station to Cumulus Media in exchange for the frequency 94.9 FM and WYGY.

=== Classic hits (2007–present) ===
With the new Cumulus ownership, station management updated WGRR's format. In early 2007, WGRR adopted a new logo to reflect its revised format, which shifted from "Oldies" of the 1960s and 1970s, to "Classic Hits", centering on the 1970s and 80s. In recent years, the playlist has shifted to mostly 1980s hits with some 1970s and 1990s titles.

== Past personalities ==
The original WGRR lineup was Kenny Matthews (morning drive), Tony Michaels and Gina Ruffin Moore (news), Antonia "Mighty Toni" Mason (traffic) Steven Allan (program director and middays), Johnny Hall (production director and afternoons), Martin "Marty With The Party" Thompson (assistant program director and evenings), with Ronnie "Rockin' Ron" Schumacher (nights), and Kimberly "Slim Kim" Carson (overnights).

For weekends WGRR adopted the Hot Wax Weekend concept by adding legendary WSAI disc jockeys from the 1960s: Dusty Rhodes, Ted McAllister and Jack Stahl. Also in the original WGRR lineup was Daniel "Dangerous Dan" Allen (Saturday Night Dial-A-Hit), with Tommy "Super Tom" Schroeder who worked overnight weekends like Saturday mornings and Sunday afternoons, and longtime "Oldies" jock himself J.D. Hughes who stayed at WGRR after its transformation from CHUrban WBLZ.

WGRR had been home to Jim "The Music Professor" Labarbara, voted by his peers as one of the Top 40 radio personalities of all time. Jim is also a member of the Rock Jock Hall of Fame and was inducted into the Ohio Radio/Television Broadcasters Hall of Fame. He was replaced in early 2007 by program director Keith Mitchell, formerly PD of WMOJ-FM (Mojo 94.9).
