= WGRI =

Radio station in Cincinnati, Ohio

- Cincinnati, Ohio; United States
- Broadcast area: Cincinnati metro area
- Frequency: 1050 kHz
- Branding: Inspiration 1050

Programming
- Format: Urban gospel

Ownership
- Owner: Christian Broadcasting System, Ltd.
- Sister stations: WCVX

History
- First air date: October 5, 1947
- Former call signs: WZIP (1947–1981); WTSJ (1981–2006); WCVX (2006–2013)

Technical information
- Licensing authority: FCC
- Facility ID: 25525
- Class: B
- Power: 1,000 watts (day); 279 watts (night)
- Transmitter coordinates: 39°04′50″N 84°31′18″W
- Translator: 103.1 W276DD (Cincinnati)

Links
- Public license information: Public file; LMS
- Webcast: Listen live
- Website: inspiration1050.com

WGRI (1050 AM) is a commercial radio station licensed to Cincinnati, Ohio, United States, featuring an urban gospel format known as "Inspiration 1050". Currently owned by Christian Broadcasting System, Ltd., the station's studios are located in Cincinnati, while the transmitter resides in Covington, Kentucky. In addition to a standard analog transmission, WGRI is relayed on Cincinnati translator W276DD (103.1 FM) and is available online.

The station was originally established as WZIP and broadcast until 1960 in Covington proper. Shortly after relocating to Cincinnati, the station was sold to Carl Lindner Jr. and his two brothers; under Linder ownership, WZIP carried country music through the late 1960s and featured gospel music through the 1970s. WZIP was the first station to be purchased and owned by the nascent radio conglomerate Jacor in 1981, upon which it was renamed WTSJ after one of Jacor's principal founders. Becoming WCVX in 2006, the current WGRI call sign and urban gospel format were adopted in 2013.

== History ==
=== WZIP in Covington ===
Northern Kentucky Airwaves Corporation filed on February 4, 1946, for a new radio station on 1050 kHz to be operated at Covington, Kentucky, and was granted a construction permit on May 29, 1947. In being granted the application, Northern Kentucky Airwaves, headed by Arthur Eilerman, prevailed over Northern Kentucky Radio, led by Arthur's brother, B.J. Eilerman; one witness at the hearing said the services proposed by both were "as like as peas in a pod". Taking the call letters WZIP, the station proceeded with construction; before signing on, however, it lost its planned general manager. Charles H. Topmiller had been the chief engineer of WCKY and planned to resign from that station to head up the new WZIP, but he was instead offered the post of manager at WCKY.

WZIP began broadcasting October 5, 1947. It was the first radio station to operate from northern Kentucky since WCKY had moved across the Ohio River to Cincinnati in 1939; it operated from studios on the fourth floor of the former Peoples Savings Bank Building in downtown Covington, where WCKY's first broadcasts had been made in 1929. The full-service station was the first in the Cincinnati market to employ a Black disc jockey, Ernie Waites.

At the end of 1957, WZIP, Incorporated, successor to Northern Kentucky Airwaves, filed to sell the station to a corporation controlled by Len Goorian, a longtime television personality in the area, and attorney Alfred B. Katz for $150,000. WZIP, by this point airing a "good music" format, scored a coup when it became the Mutual Broadcasting System affiliate for the Cincinnati area on July 21, 1958, replacing longtime Mutual outlet and network founder WLW. Goorian and Katz filed to increase the station's power to 1,000 watts and relocated executive offices to the Hotel Vernon Manor, across the river in Cincinnati.

=== Move to Cincinnati ===
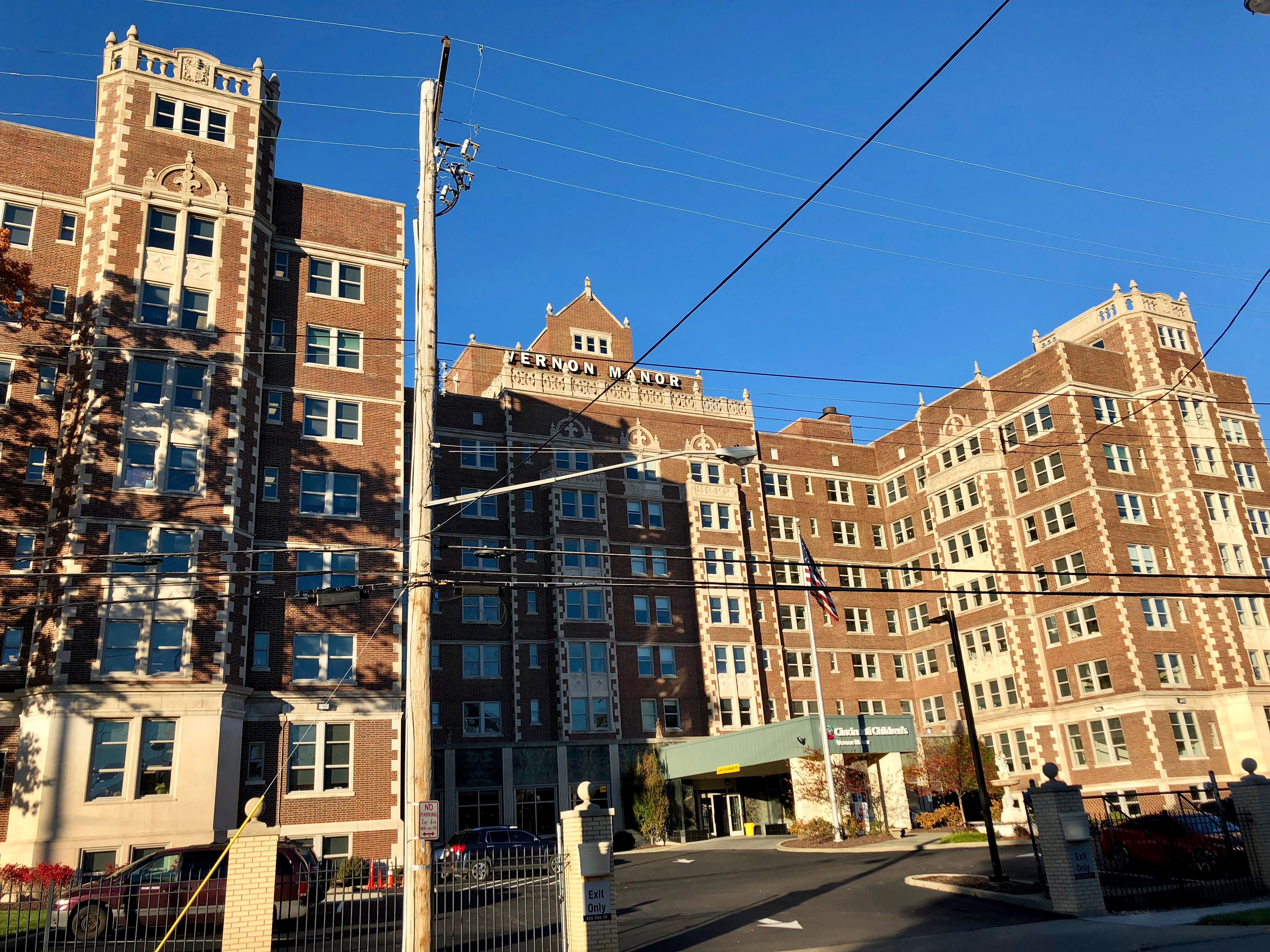
The Vernon Manor housed WZIP offices beginning in 1958 and studios beginning in 1960

At the end of 1958, Goorian and Katz sold WZIP to a new corporation headed by Ed Skotch, Dan Balsamo, and Monte Fassnacht, known as Greater Cincinnati Radio. Major changes followed the approval of the purchase in early 1959. The station was approved to increase power to 1,000 watts, a filing made by the previous ownership, Following the example of the executive offices, Greater Cincinnati Radio filed to move WZIP's city of license and studios from Covington to Cincinnati, citing a desire to increase its identification with the Ohio city. The FCC approved the change on April 13, 1960.

Just two months after the FCC approved the station's relocation to Cincinnati, Greater Cincinnati Radio was sold to the Lindner brothers—Carl, Robert and Richard—for $500,000. The Lindner brothers also owned the United Dairy Farmers convenience store chain and Thriftway Super Markets in the Cincinnati area. The Lindners also received a construction permit to build a new FM radio station, WZIP-FM 92.5, but it would not sign on the air under their ownership, as WZIP-AM-FM was purchased by the Waukegan News-Sun newspaper in Illinois for $450,000 in 1961. That same year, Mutual moved from WZIP to WCKY.

The News-Sun built WZIP-FM, which began broadcasting on August 17, 1964, and simulcast WZIP's programming during daylight hours. The next year, WZIP was sold to another out-of-town publishing interest: the Zanesville Publishing Company, publisher of the Zanesville Times-Recorder and owner of radio and television properties in Ohio and West Virginia, for $367,500. Unlike the last several sales of WZIP, this one brought a format change. At the start of 1966, WZIP flipped to country, becoming the Cincinnati area's third station in the format.

WZIP changed hands yet again in 1970, when Margareta Sudbrink purchased the stations for $750,000. In February 1971, WZIP-FM became easy listening WWEZ; it moved to separate studios in Highland Towers, leaving WZIP in Vernon Manor. The country format on AM lasted until October 1, 1971, when the station flipped to gospel; the new format, the only religious station on the AM band in the area, propelled the station to higher revenue than it had achieved in any prior point in history.

Sudbrink sold off WZIP and identically formatted WTOW in Towson, Maryland, to its executive vice president, Hal Gore, at the end of 1974; WZIP cost $375,000. The purchase kickstarted a chain of gospel radio stations that had grown to six outlets by 1978. That year, Gore moved WZIP out of the Vernon Manor after a 20-year stay and into new quarters in a former post office building.

=== WTSJ ===
Hal Gore sold three of his stations—WZIP, WTOW and Toledo's WGOR—to Jaco Broadcasting, a company majority-owned by Jacor, Inc., for $1.5 million in 1980. The principal of Jacor, making its first station purchases, was Terry S. Jacobs, senior vice president of Great American Insurance Company. The call sign changed to WTSJ on April 8, 1981. Four years after the purchase, and after the company had begun to buy stations in major markets, Jacor sold WTSJ and WTOW to American Sunrise Communications, a private company specializing in the operation of religious radio stations, for more than $2.4 million. As early as 1986, WTSJ was recognized as having been "the beginning of a major broadcast entity".

American Sunrise sold five of its stations to Guardian Communications, which was owned by two employees of sister station KTSJ in Pomona, California, for $5.6 million in 1990. Guardian was one of the largest contributors to a successful 1993 voter-approved amendment to Cincinnati's city charter that removed discrimination protections for gays and lesbians.

Guardian, with its nine stations in Albuquerque, Baltimore, Cincinnati, Cleveland and Pueblo, Colorado, was put up for auction in 1996 in an event precipitated by one of the 1050 frequency's former owners. Carl Lindner, through Great American Insurance, owned 50 percent of the company at that time, and after cashing out its stake in Citicasters, it opted to sell its stake in Guardian, prompting co-owners Mark McNeil and Richard David to follow suit. Salem Communications filed to purchase the Baltimore, Cleveland and Cincinnati stations for $3 million. Under Salem ownership, WTSJ adopted a Christian radio format.

=== WCVX and WGRI ===
Logo before FM translator sign-on.

Salem retained ownership of WTSJ until 2005, when it traded it and WBOB (1160 AM) to Christian Broadcasting System in exchange for WLQV in Detroit. Christian Broadcasting System retained the Christian talk format on 1050 but assigned new WCVX call letters.

The WCVX call letters and Christian format moved to the stronger 1160 AM signal on February 1, 2013. At that time, 1050 AM flipped to its present urban gospel format and changed call letters to WGRI.

== Translator ==
WGRI is additionally relayed over the following low-power FM translator:

Broadcast translator for WGRI
Call sign	Frequency	City of license	FID	ERP (W)	HAAT	Class	Transmitter coordinates	FCC info
W276DD	103.1 FM	Cincinnati	147546	75	−212 m (−696 ft)	D	39°6′59.2″N 84°30′6.8″W	LMS
