= WKRQ =

Hot adult contemporary radio station in Cincinnati

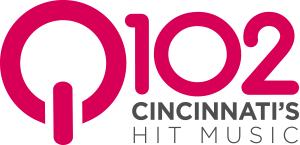
- Cincinnati, Ohio; United States
- Broadcast area: Cincinnati metropolitan area
- Frequency: 101.9 MHz (HD Radio)
- Branding: Q102

Programming
- Language: English
- Format: Top 40
- Subchannels: HD2: Yacht rock "Smoothinati 101.9 HD2"

Ownership
- Owner: Hubbard Broadcasting; (Cincinnati FCC License Sub, LLC)
- Sister stations: WREW; WUBE-FM; WYGY

History
- First air date: March 17, 1947
- Former call signs: WCTS (1947–1950); WKRC-FM (1950–1972)
- Call sign meaning: derived from former sister station WKRC, substituted with a "Q"

Technical information
- Licensing authority: FCC
- Facility ID: 11276
- Class: B
- ERP: 16,000 watts
- HAAT: 264 meters (866 ft)

Links
- Public license information: Public file; LMS
- Webcast: Listen live
- Website: www.wkrq.com

WKRQ (101.9 MHz, Q102) is a commercial radio station located in the Cincinnati metropolitan area. The station is licensed to Cincinnati and broadcasts from the WKRQ Tower. It airs a Top 40 format and is owned by Hubbard Broadcasting. The station's studios have been located on Kennedy Avenue in the Oakley neighborhood of Cincinnati with co-owned WREW, WUBE-FM and WYGY since August 2021.

== History ==
WKRQ signed on the air in 1947 as WCTS, which aired a classical music format. After WCTS was bought by Radio Cincinnati, Inc. (which became Taft Broadcasting in 1959), the station would change its call letters to WKRC-FM in 1950, while retaining the classical format. In 1970, WKRC-FM would become a Top 40 station as "Stereo 102", and was an automated Drake-Chenault station. In 1972, WKRC-FM became WKRQ, and became a live and local Top 40 station using "102 KRQ" as its primary identity and "Q102" and "the Q" as secondary monikers, with "Q102" being adopted as its primary moniker in 1975. With the exception of a brief switch to an album-oriented rock format between June and December 1973, WKRQ's CHR format has been in place since 1970, making Q102 one of the longest-running currently broadcasting Top 40 stations in the United States, despite its shift towards an adult top 40 format in the mid-1990s, leaving Top 40/CHR rival WKFS to take the younger audience by default.

The late 1970s sitcom WKRP in Cincinnati is often said to be based on either WKRQ or WKRC, with the final letter being the only difference. In reality, though, the show was based on creator Hugh Wilson's experience with WQXI in Atlanta.

In 1980, 16-year-old Mary Buchanan won the first one-million-dollar prize ever awarded by any radio or TV station in the United States in a joint contest with sister station WKRC. The feat earned her and the station a place in the Guinness Book of World Records.

Taft Broadcasting would be reorganized as Great American Broadcasting in 1987. However, the company would declare bankruptcy in 1993, and was reorganized as Citicasters, Inc. (their sister AM station would be sold to another locally-based company, Jacor). In 1996, Citicasters itself merged with Jacor (which was subsequently acquired by Clear Channel, now known as iHeartRadio); as part of the merger, WKRQ was sold to Boston-based American Radio Systems (ARS) on March 7, 1997 (this separated WKRQ from their long-time TV sister station). In September 1997, Infinity Broadcasting (which was renamed CBS Radio in December 2005) would acquire ARS as part of a group deal; the merger was completed the following June. CBS owned WKRQ until November 2006, when it was sold to Entercom. Entercom, in turn, announced in January 2007 that it would be swapping its entire Cincinnati cluster, including WKRQ, to Bonneville International together with three radio stations in Seattle, Washington, for all three of Bonneville's FM radio stations in San Francisco, California, and $1 million cash. In May 2007, the station launched an online stream from its website at www.wkrq.com. Also that month, Bonneville officially took over the operations of Entercom's former Cincinnati radio cluster through a local marketing agreement. Entercom officially closed on its acquisition of the stations on November 30. The sale of the Cincinnati cluster to Bonneville was conditionally approved in November 2007, with the remainder of the deal finally approved in March 2008. The official transfer of the Cincinnati stations to Bonneville took place on March 14.

WKRQ became the only hot adult contemporary station in Cincinnati since the flip of WNNF to adult album alternative in 2009. WNNF returned to hot AC in 2011, only to dump it again the following year.

On January 19, 2011, it was announced that Bonneville International would sell WKRQ and several other stations to Hubbard Broadcasting for $505 million. The sale was completed on April 29, 2011.
