= WOFX-FM =

- Cincinnati, Ohio; United States
- Broadcast area: Greater Cincinnati
- Frequency: 92.5 MHz
- Branding: 92.5 The Fox

Programming
- Format: Classic rock
- Affiliations: Westwood One

Ownership
- Owner: Cumulus Media; (Cumulus Licensing LLC)
- Sister stations: WGRR; WRRM; WNNF; WFTK

History
- First air date: August 19, 1964
- Former call signs: WZIP-FM (1964–1971); WWEZ (1971–1992); WIMJ (1992–1994); WPPT (1994–1995)
- Call sign meaning: "Fox"

Technical information
- Licensing authority: FCC
- Facility ID: 51725
- Class: B
- ERP: 16,000 watts
- HAAT: 264 meters (866 ft)
- Transmitter coordinates: 39°6′59.2″N 84°30′6.8″W

Links
- Public license information: Public file; LMS
- Webcast: Listen live
- Website: foxcincinnati.com

WOFX-FM (92.5 MHz) is a commercial radio station in Cincinnati, Ohio. It broadcasts a classic rock radio format and is owned by Cumulus Media. It is the Cincinnati affiliate for the Bob and Tom morning radio show. The studios are on Montgomery Road in Norwood, Ohio, using a Cincinnati address.

WOFX-FM has an effective radiated power (ERP) of 16,000 watts. The transmitter site is on Highland Avenue at Interstate 71, northeast of Downtown Cincinnati, co-located with the tower used for WKRC-TV.

== History ==
=== Jazz, beautiful music and AC ===
On August 19, 1964, the station signed on as WZIP-FM. The format was jazz, and carried hourly reports from CBS Radio News. The format changed to country music in 1966. In 1971, the station was sold to Woody Sudbrink, and its call sign changed to WWEZ, with the format flipping to beautiful music. WWEZ played quarter hour sweeps of instrumental cover versions of pop songs, along with Broadway and Hollywood show tunes. The station became popular for workplace and office listening.

Over time, to reach a younger audience, WWEZ added more soft vocals and decreased the instrumentals. While the ratings were good, the audience continued to age past the demographic sought by advertisers. In the summer of 1990, WWEZ made the transition from easy listening to soft adult contemporary. On January 1, 1992, WWEZ rebranded as "Majic 92", and changed call letters to WIMJ on February 2.

=== Classic rock "The Fox" ===
WOFX-FM, "The Fox" began broadcasting on 94.9 FM on July 22, 1988, replacing soft AC station WLLT. The Fox was a rival to the radio station on 92.5, WIMJ. On April 7, 1994, WIMJ switched to a rock-leaning 1970s hits format dubbed "The Point," with the call sign of WPPT.

In 1994, Jacor Communications (later acquired by Clear Channel Communications), purchased WPPT from Pathfinder Communications. Jacor later purchased the intellectual property and call sign of WOFX, moving "The Fox" to the 92.5 dial position at noon on September 13, 1995. On August 1, 2008, Clear Channel put the station, along with sister station WNNF, up for sale. Clear Channel needed to spin the stations off to settle regulatory issues involved in the company's sale to private equity firms.

On January 3, 2009, Cumulus Media was chosen as a buyer and was willing to swap five of its radio stations in Wisconsin to make the transaction complete. Cumulus continued the classic rock format and Fox moniker. WOFX-FM was the FM flagship station of the Cincinnati Bengals through the 2008 preseason. WEBN is the current FM flagship station for the Cincinnati Bengals Radio Network.
