= WUBE-FM =

Country music radio station in Cincinnati

- Cincinnati, Ohio; United States
- Broadcast area: Cincinnati metropolitan area
- Frequency: 105.1 MHz (HD Radio)
- Branding: B-105

Programming
- Format: Country
- Subchannels: HD2: Country top 30 "The Bull"; HD3: WYGY simulcast

Ownership
- Owner: Hubbard Broadcasting; (Cincinnati FCC License Sub, LLC)
- Sister stations: WKRQ; WREW; WYGY

History
- First air date: July 8, 1949
- Former call signs: WCPO-FM (1949–1966); WCXL-FM (1966–1971)

Technical information
- Licensing authority: FCC
- Facility ID: 10140
- Class: B
- ERP: 14,500 watts
- HAAT: 280 meters (920 ft)
- Transmitter coordinates: 39°7′30″N 84°29′56″W

Links
- Public license information: Public file; LMS
- Webcast: Listen live
- Website: www.b105.com

WUBE-FM (105.1 MHz) is a radio station broadcasting a country music radio format. Licensed to Cincinnati, Ohio, it is owned by Hubbard Broadcasting.

WUBE-FM has an effective radiated power (ERP) of 14,500 watts. It broadcasts using HD Radio technology. It airs an alternate country music format on its HD2 digital subchannel. The studios are located on Kennedy Avenue, in the Oakley neighborhood of Cincinnati where they have been since August 2021, while the transmitter remains closer to Downtown Cincinnati, in the Walnut Hills neighborhood.

== History ==
The station was originally known as WCPO-FM, owned by the E. W. Scripps Company, signed on July 8, 1949. One of the WCPO-FM announcers identified the frequency in the legal ID as 10-51 (ten-fifty-one) which was unique at the time. In January 1966, shortly after Scripps sold WCPO-AM-FM to Kaye-Smith Broadcasting, both stations changed their call signs to WUBE and WCXL-FM. WUBE switched to its long-running country format in April 1969. In October 1971, WCXL-FM dropped its good time automated music format to become a country format station, changing its call letters to WUBE-FM with the FM partially simulcasting the AM throughout the early 1970s. Then in 1975, the FM became the dominant signal. The mornings and afternoons were usually simulcast with middays and evenings split into separate air shifts. WUBE AM switched to Music of Your Life as WMLX in September 1981, and oldies as WDJO in 1985; the country format remained on WUBE-FM.

Kaye-Smith Broadcasting sold WUBE-AM-FM to Plough Broadcasting in the late 1970s, with Plough selling the stations to DKM Broadcasting in 1984 (Approved by the FCC October 10, 1984). Two years later, both WUBE-FM and WDJO were sold to American Media. In 1991, American Media sold the stations to National Radio Partners, which later changed its name to Chancellor Media, and then to AMFM, Inc. in 1999. The following year, due to AMFM's merger with Clear Channel Communications, WUBE-FM was sold to Infinity Broadcasting (which became CBS Radio in December 2005), while the AM station was sold to Blue Chip Broadcasting. CBS sold WUBE to Entercom on August 21, 2006, along with CBS Radio's other Cincinnati stations.

On January 18, 2007, almost as soon as it entered the Cincinnati radio market, Entercom announced its exit from the market by trading its entire Cincinnati cluster, including WUBE, to Bonneville International. Also included in the sale were three radio stations in Seattle, in exchange for all three of Bonneville's FM radio stations in San Francisco, and $1 million cash. In May 2007, Bonneville officially took over control of the Cincinnati radio cluster through a local marketing agreement (LMA), with Bonneville acquiring Entercom's remaining interest in the stations outright on March 14, 2008.

WUBE was one of the winners in the 2008 NAB Crystal Radio Awards.

On January 19, 2011, Bonneville International announced it would sell WUBE and several other stations to Hubbard Broadcasting for $505 million. The sale was completed on April 29, 2011.

== See also ==
- List of radio stations in Ohio
