= Heiligenstock transmitter =

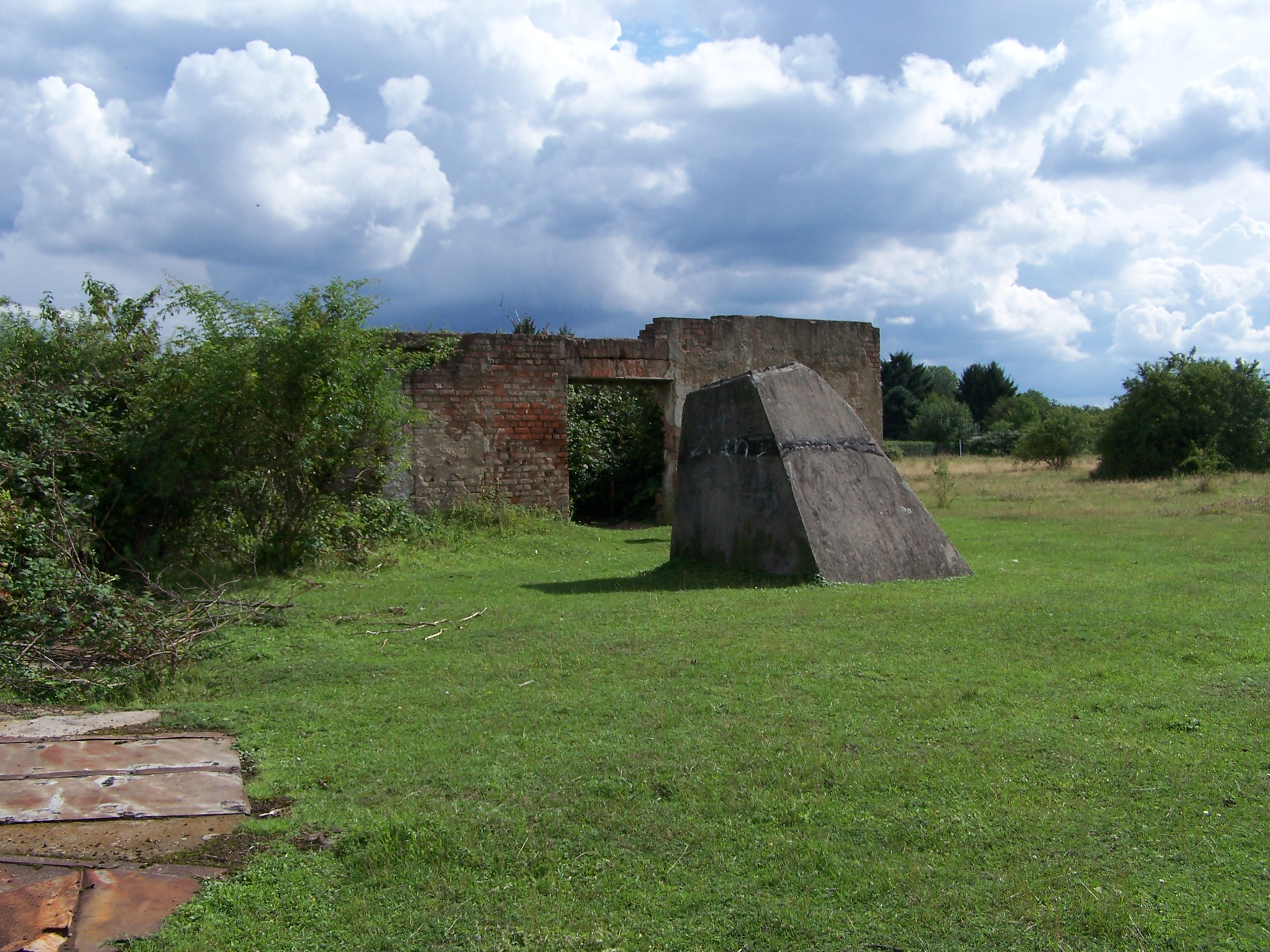

- Location within Hesse
- Location: Frankfurt
- Mast height: 107 m (351 ft)
- Coordinates: 50.1546832°N 8.711112°E
- Built: 1934
- Demolished: March 25, 1945

Heiligenstock Transmitter, also known as the Heiligenstock Radio Tower, was a wooden German lattice transmitter that was used for mediumwave broadcasting. The tower was built in the year 1934 but was dismantled four years later because of its bad state. The tower was then rebuilt the same year it was dismantled in the city of Frankfurt. The newly rebuilt radio tower was then demolished on March 25, 1945 during the Second World War by the retreating German troops using explosives. It was 107 metres tall.

== See also ==
- Utbremen Radio Tower
- Stettin Radio Tower
- Gustav-Vietor-Tower
- Schomberg Observation Tower
- Gillerberg Observation Tower
- Gross Reken Melchenberg Radio Tower
- Poppenberg Observation Tower
