= Torre de Herveo =

Coordinates: 5°3′21.45″N 75°29′9.33″W

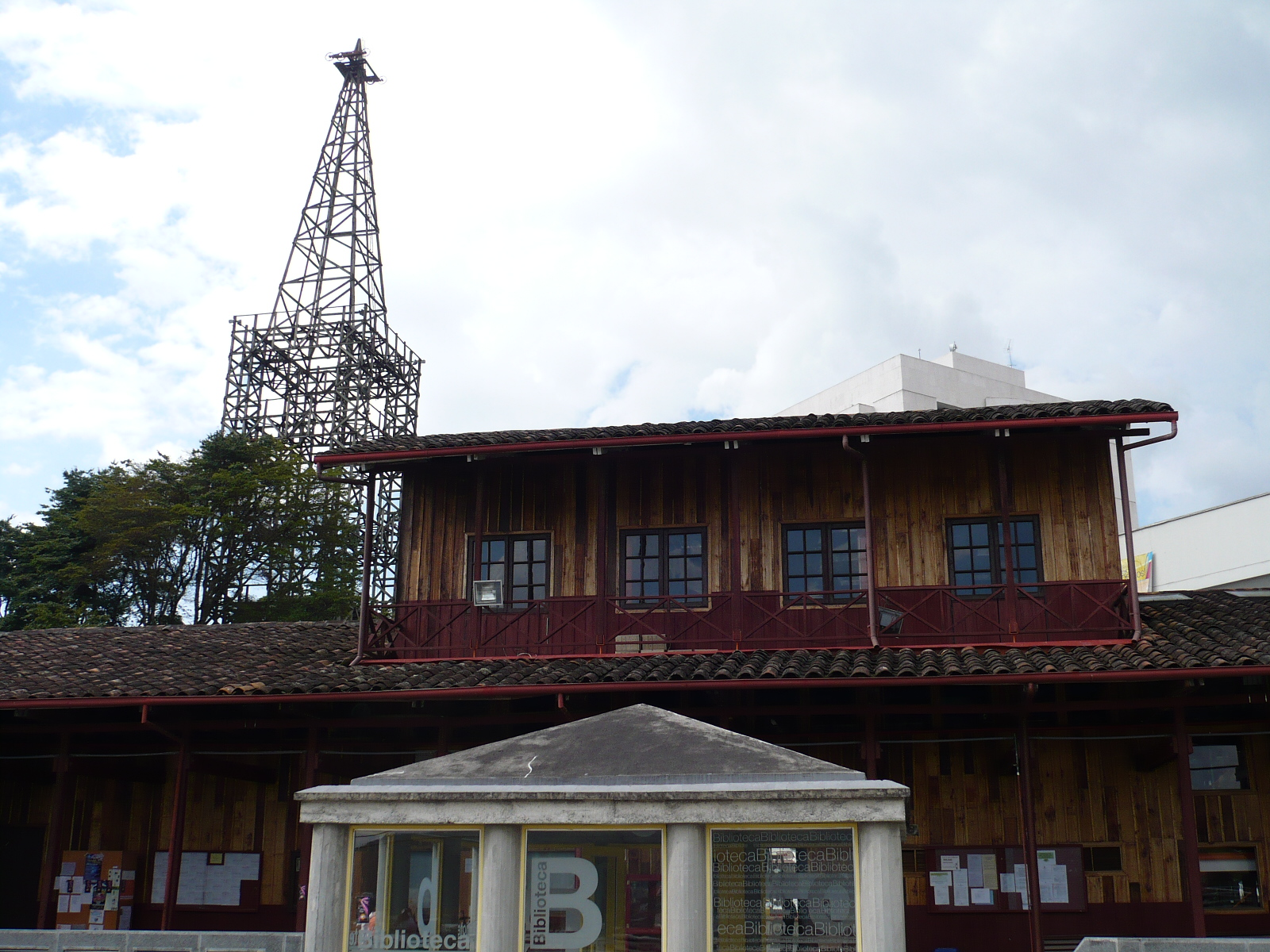
Torre de Herveo (left) and the cable station (Spanish: Estación del Cable "Cable Station") (center).

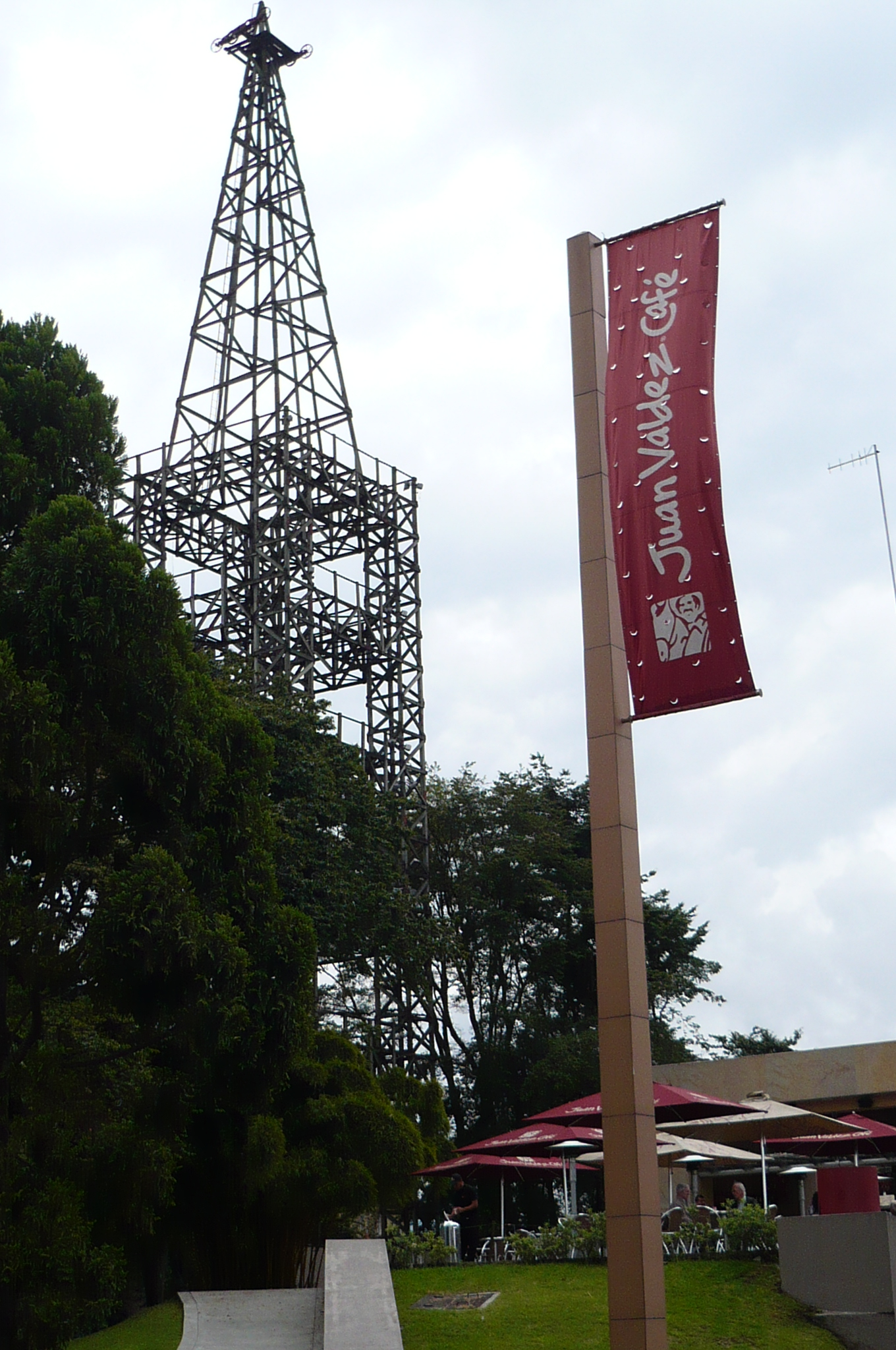
Torre de Herveo and a "Juan Valdez Cafe" flag in front.

Torre de Herveo (English: Tower of Herveo), also known as Torre del Cable (English: Cable Tower), is a wooden Colombian lattice tower which was the tallest of the support towers of the Manizales - Mariquita Cableway. The Torre de Herveo was in service from 1922 to 1961. It only serves as a monument and as transportation today. The engineer who built the tower was James Lindsay. Wood was chosen as the building material for the tower and was built with approximately 1,470 blocks of timber from the wood of Guaiac, Mahogany, Bay and Comino trees.

== History ==
Engineer James Lindsay designed the Torre de Herveo in 1922. His plan was put to work afterwards. When its construction was finished, the tower became a tall support tower since then until 1961. It became a monument since the shutdown of the cableway.

== See also ==
- Lattice tower
- Gliwice Radio Tower
- Madona Radio Towers
- Gross Reken Melchenberg Radio Tower
- Gustav-Vietor-Tower
- Schomberg Observation Tower
- Mariquita
- Manizales
- Herveo
