= Poppenberg Observation Tower =

Coordinates: 51°35′05″N 10°48′12″E

- Aussichtsturm Poppenberg
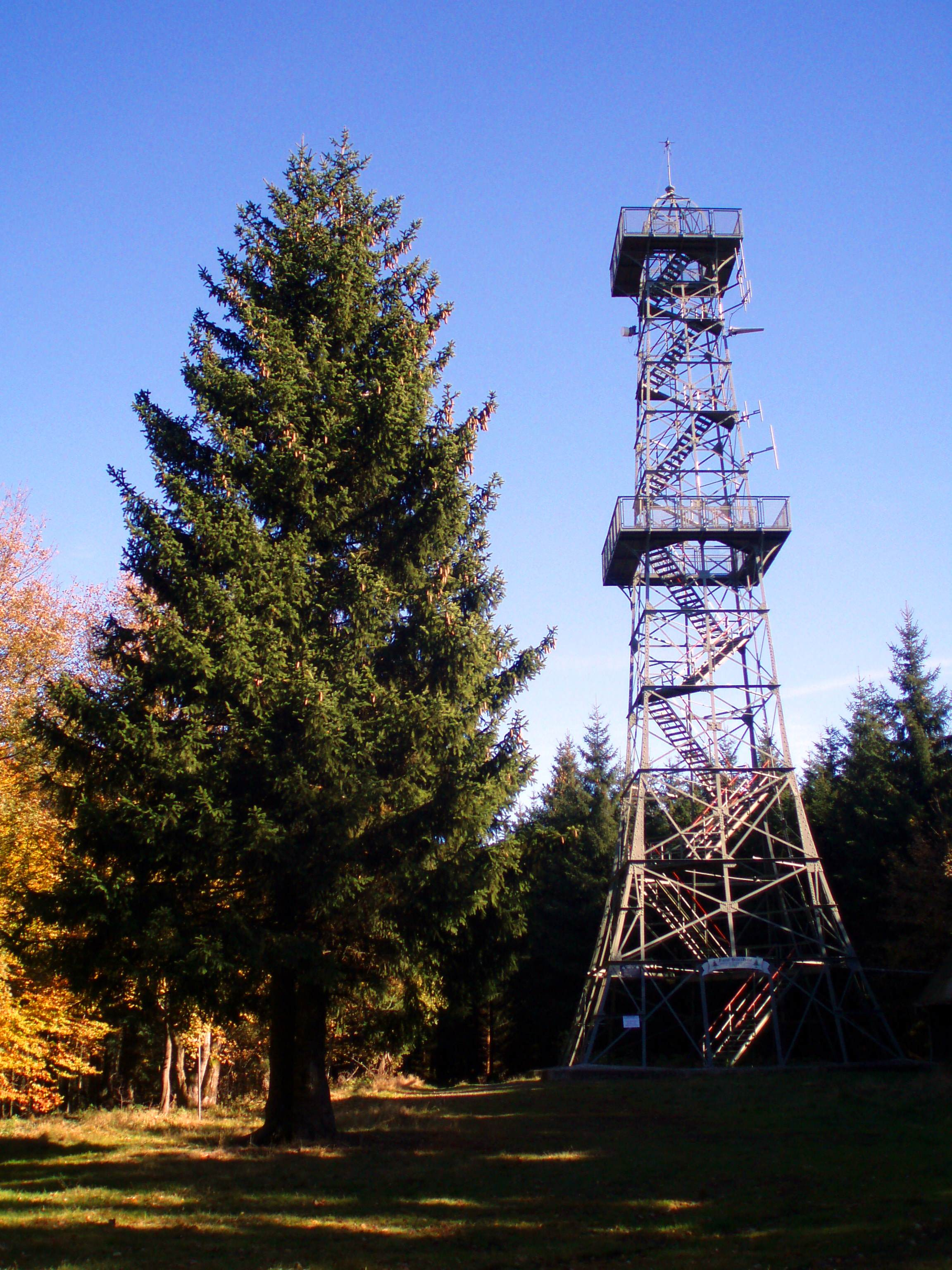

General information
- Town or city: Poppenberg (Harz)
- Country: Germany
- Year(s) built: 1897
- Renovated: 1994

Poppenberg Observation Tower (German: Aussichtsturm Poppenberg "Poppenberg Observation Tower") is a steel German lattice observation tower that is used for observation, at the same time, for communication. It is a truss tower located in the summit of Poppenberg. It is one of the oldest steel lattice towers in Germany and was built in the year 1897. It was later on refurbished in 1994. The tower was built by the Nordhausen branch of the Harz Club. The tower was also named after Otto, Prince of Stolberg-Wernigerode. It has an antenna that is 33 metres long.

== Geography ==
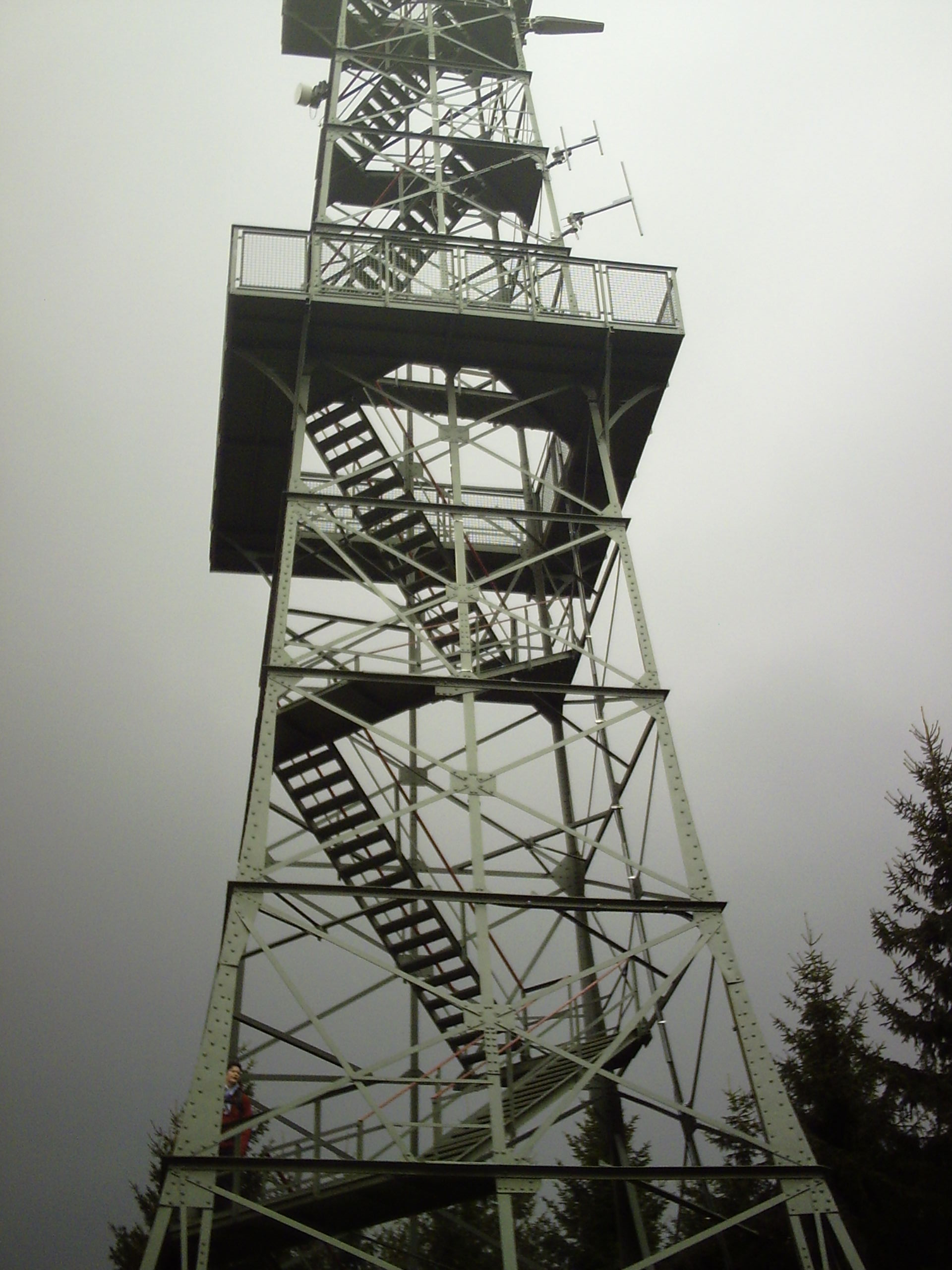
Poppenberg Observation Tower during a rainy day.

The Poppenberg Observation Tower is situated on the 601-metre-high (1,972 ft) mountain, Poppenberg, east of the village of Ilfeld, found in the free state of Thuringia. Its postal code is 99768.

== See also ==
- Poppenberg (Harz)
- Gross Reken Melchenberg Radio Tower
- Schomberg Observation Tower
- Gillerberg Observation Tower
- Madona Radio Towers
