= Poppenberg (Harz) =

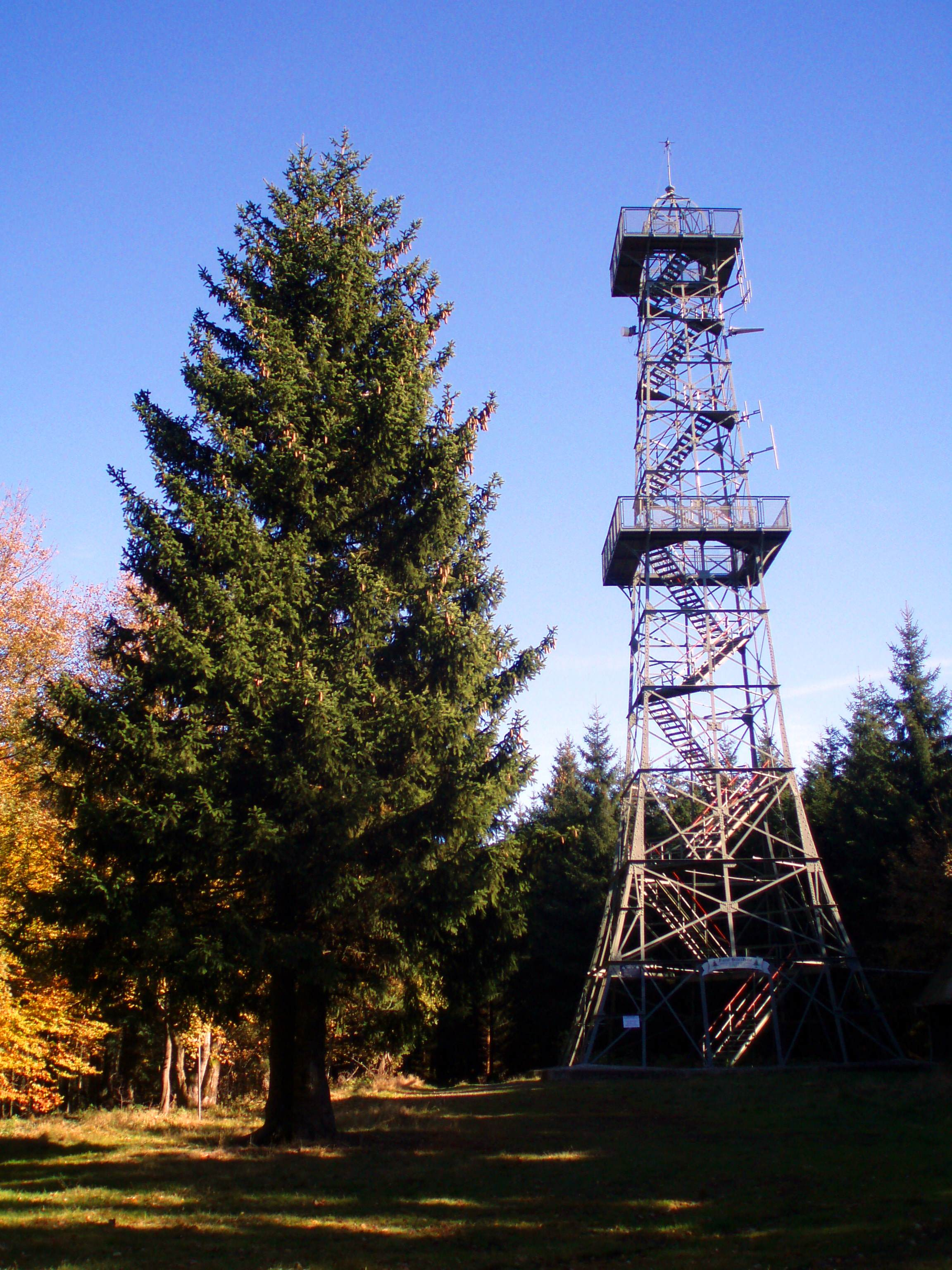
- Observation tower on the Poppenberg

Highest point
- Elevation: 600.8 m above sea level (HN) (1,971 ft)
- Coordinates: 51°35′05″N 10°48′12″E

Geography
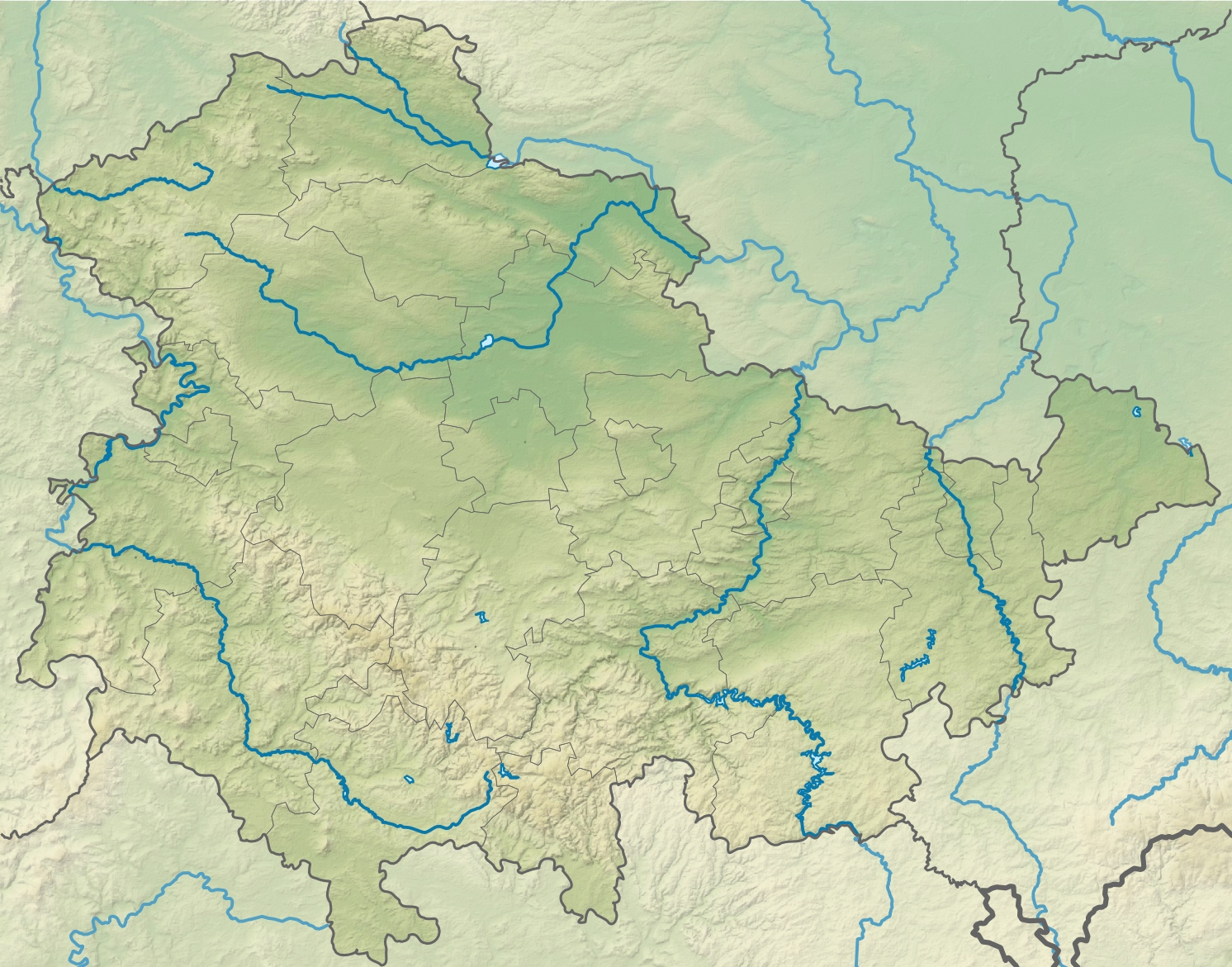
- Location within Thuringia
- Location: Thüringen, Germany
- Parent range: Harz Mountains

The Poppenberg is a tree-covered hill east of Ilfeld in the Harz mountains of Germany, at an elevation of 601 metres. Since 1897, there has been a 33-metre-high (108 ft) steel lattice observation tower on the summit. The tower was built by the Nordhausen branch of the Harz Club and was named after Otto, Prince of Stolberg-Wernigerode. In good weather, it has an extensive view over the South Harz, the Goldene Aue and the Kyffhäuser.

The Poppenberg is no. 92 in the system of check points in the Harzer Wandernadel network of walking trails.

== History ==
Until 1932, the hill belonged to the Prussian Province of Hanover, but was then transferred to the Province of Saxony. Today, it lies in the free state of Thuringia and is the highest elevation in the Thuringian part of the Harz. In 1994, the Poppenberg Observation Tower, the hill's lattice observation tower, was refurbished.

== Geography ==
The Poppenberg is situated east of Ilfeld, in the Harz mountains, in the state of Thuringia.

== See also ==
- Poppenberg Observation Tower
- Gillerberg Observation Tower
- Schomberg Observation Tower
