= MZL (disambiguation) =

MZL may refer to:

- Marginal zone lymphoma, a type of blood cancer.
- The IATA code for La Nubia Airport
  - Coffee Airport, an under construction airport meant to replace La Nubia Airport
- The ISO 639 language code for Isthmus Mixe
