= Masters M70 pole vault world record progression =

This is the progression of world record improvements of the pole vault M70 division of Masters athletics.

Key

Incomplete information Pending

Height	Athlete	Nationality	Birthdate	Age	Location	Date	Ref
3.53 m	Wolfgang Ritte	Germany	7 January 1953	70 years, 261 days	Pescara	25 September 2023	
3.52 m	Wolfgang Ritte	Germany	7 January 1953	70 years, 130 days	Reken	17 May 2023	
3.51 m	Wolfgang Ritte	Germany	7 January 1953	70 years, 119 days	Dortmund	6 May 2023	
3.50 m	Wolfgang Ritte	Germany	7 January 1953	70 years, 114 days	Wipperfürth	1 May 2023	
3.56 m i	Wolfgang Ritte	Germany	7 January 1953	70 years, 83 days	Toruń	31 March 2023	
3.55 m i	Wolfgang Ritte	Germany	7 January 1953	70 years, 7 days	Horn-Bad Meinberg	14 January 2023	
3.49 m	John Altendorf	United States	12 March 1946	70 years, 21 days	McMinnville	2 April 2016	
3.40 m	Robert "Bob" Fulton	United States	29 January 1940	70 years, 141 days	Joplin	19 June 2010	
3.31 m	Robert Brown	Great Britain	9 April 1932	70 years, 135 days	Potsdam	22 August 2002	
3.30 m	Herbert Schmidt	Germany	11 January 1910	70 years, 189 days	Duisburg	18 July 1980	
