= Utbremen Radio Tower =

1930s era radio tower in Bremen, Germany

- Utbremen Funkturm
- Alternative names: Utbremen Transmission Tower, Utbremen Broadcast Tower, Mooris Transmission Tower

General information
- Type: Lattice radio tower
- Location: Bremen, Bremen, Germany, Germany, Nazi Germany
- Construction started: 1933
- Completed: 1933
- Destroyed: 1939

Height
- Antenna spire: 90 m (295 ft)

Utbremen Radio Tower, also known as Utbremen Transmission Tower or Utbremen Broadcast Tower, (German: Utbremen Funkturm "Utbremen Radio Tower") was a wooden German lattice radio tower that was mainly built for mediumwave broadcasting. The tower was built in 1933 but was destroyed six years later, in 1939, by lightning. It had an antenna that was 90 metres long.

== History ==
The Utbremen Radio Tower was built in the city of Bremen, in the year 1933. It was then destroyed, six years after the tower was built, by lightning.

== Geography ==
The Utbremen Radio Tower was located in the Hanseatic city municipality of Bremen, which is the capital city of the free Hanseatic state of Bremen, the smallest of Germany's 16 states.

== See also ==
- Lattice tower
- Gustav-Vietor-Tower
- Gross Reken Melchenberg Radio Tower
- Gillerberg Observation Tower
- Schomberg Observation Tower
- Bremen
