= Manizales - Mariquita Cableway =

Coordinates: 5°3′21.45″N 75°29′9.33″W

The Manizales - Mariquita Cableway was a cableway used for transporting coffee, that connected Mariquita (Tolima) with the city of Manizales (Caldas), both in central Colombia. It was one of the most important engineering works carried out in Colombia in response to the difficult topography of the region, that hindered the construction of a railroad.

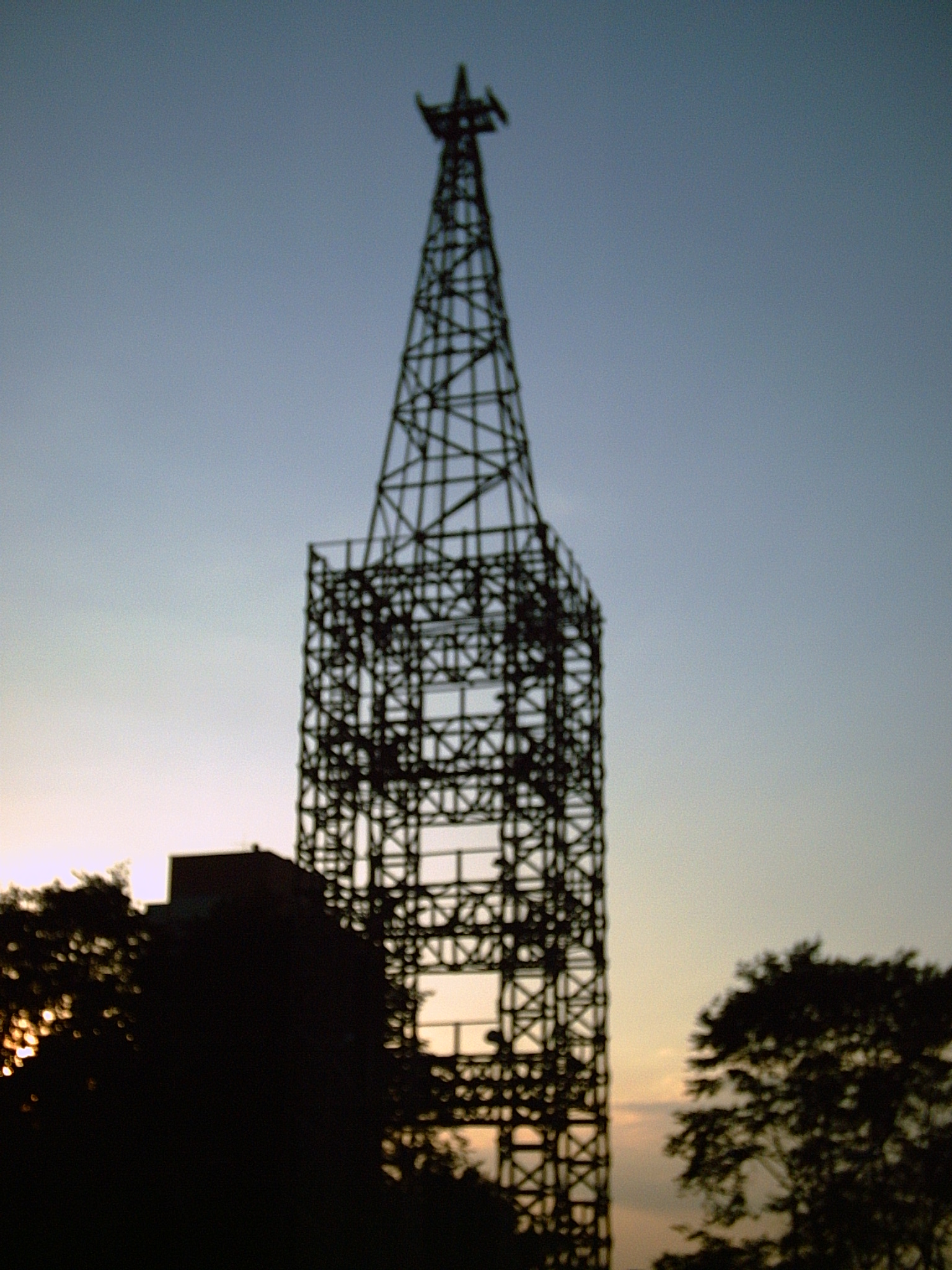
Torre de Herveo, the only tower that remains, now restored and moved to Manizales.

== History ==
In the first decade of the twentieth century, an English company called The Ropeway Extension, obtained a concession from the Colombian government to build a ropeway (at the time, the longest one in the world), which cover a distance of approximately 72 kilometers between Mariquita, in Tolima and Manizales in Caldas. This would enable a link between the Colombian coffee growing axis and the ports on the Magdalena River. So far, the only roads that could have been used, were dirt roads. And railroad construction was thought to be impossible due to the difficult terrain (even though one was built later).

Exploration work began around 1912 and construction started in 1914, under guidance from James F. Lindsay, a New Zealand-born civil engineer. Construction would begin in 1914, coinciding with the start of the First World War. All machinery, tools, materials and supplies needed for the work were transported from England by boat over the Atlantic Ocean, with a smaller boat over the Magdalena River until Honda, and then by mule and ox. The first track Mariquita - Soledad (today Herveo), was inaugurated in March 1914.

Tower number 20 (Torre de Herveo), pictured above, was exceptional as it needed to be constructed in a depression between two hills. Requests were sent to England to design a special high tower, like what you see in the photo. But the ship that was carrying it to Colombia was sunk by a German submarine, which caused the construction work to be suspended almost entirely. However local engineers were able to construct a copy of the design entirely in wood.

The rest of the work resumed in 1916 and were successfully completed six years later in the Station Camelia in Manizales (January 22, 1922).

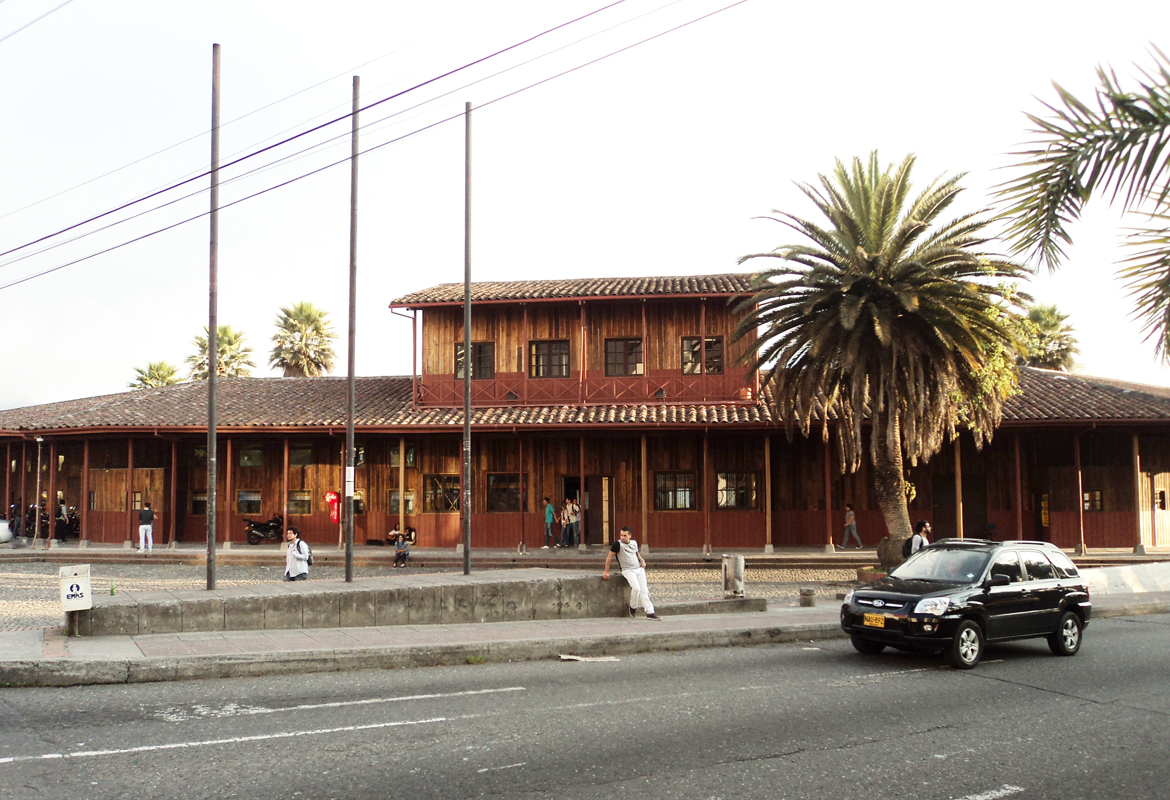
Former end station of the line (Station Camelia), in the El Cable district of Manizales.

After nearly 45 years of operation, the competition of regular road transport became too high, and the cableway ceased working on October 20, 1967. Torre de Herveo was declared a national monument, was restored and moved to Manizales.

== Data ==
- 73 km long
- 376 steel towers (exception: Torre de Herveo was partially in wood), between 4 and 55 meter high, in 15 sections
- 8 engines of 140 hp each
- 22 stations, constructed in wood
