= Nirmala Joshi =

Indian Religious sister and former Superior (1934–2015)

Sister Maria Nirmala Joshi MC
- Sister Nirmala in Witness, the Salt + Light Television programme
- Title: Superior General of the Missionaries of Charity

Personal life
- Born: 23 July 1934 Ranchi, Bihar and Orissa Province, British India
- Died: 23 June 2015 (aged 80) Kolkata, West Bengal, India
- Education: University of Calcutta (Doctor Juris)

Religious life
- Religion: Christianity (Catholicism)
- Institute: Missionaries of Charity

Senior posting
- Predecessor: Mary Teresa Bojaxhiu
- Successor: Mary Prema Pierick MC

Maria Nirmala Joshi (23 July 1934 – 23 June 2015) was an Indian religious sister who succeeded Mother Teresa as the head of the Missionaries of Charity and expanded the movement overseas. After taking over the charity following Mother Teresa's death in 1997, Nirmala expanded the organisation's reach to 134 countries by opening centres in nations such as Afghanistan and Thailand.

== Early life and education ==
Joshi, née Kusum, was born on 23 July 1934 in a Brahmin family as the eldest of the ten children at in Ranchi, Bihar and Orissa Province in the British Indian Empire (now the capital of the Indian State of Jharkhand). Her parents were from Nepal and her father was an officer of the British Indian Army until the nation's independence in 1947. Although the family was Hindu, she was educated by Christian missionaries in Mount Carmel, Hazaribagh, India. At that time, she learned of Mother Teresa's work and wanted to share in that service. She soon converted to Catholicism and joined the Missionaries of Charity, founded by Mother Teresa. Joshi completed a master's degree in political science and then went on to secure a doctorate degree in law from the University of Calcutta. She was one of the first Sisters of the institute to head a foreign mission when she went to Panama.

== Charity work ==
In 1976, Joshi started the contemplative branch of the Missionaries of Charity and remained at its head until 1997, when she was elected to succeed Mother Teresa as Superior General of the institute. Her term as Superior General ended on 25 March 2009, and she was succeeded by German born Sister Mary Prema Pierick.

== Awards ==
The government of India bestowed the Padma Vibhushan, the second highest civilian award, on Sister Joshi on Republic Day (26 January) 2009 for her services to the nation.

== Death ==
Joshi died on 25 June 2015 in Kolkata from a heart ailment. Many leaders of India expressed their condolences in media, including Prime Minister Narendra Modi and West Bengal Chief Minister Mamata Banerjee.

Catholic Church titles
Preceded by Saint Teresa	Superior General of the Missionaries of Charity; 1997–2009	Succeeded by Sister Mary Prema Pierick
