= Mary Prema Pierick =

German religious sister

Sister Mary Prema Pierick MC
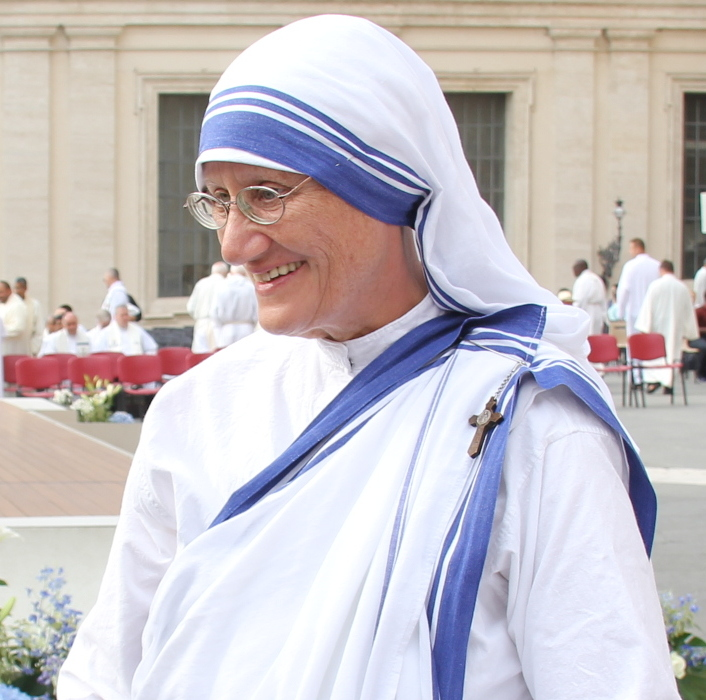
- Sr Mary in 2016
- Title: Superior General of the Missionaries of Charity

Personal life
- Born: Mechthild Pierick; 13 May 1953 (age 73) Reken, North Rhine-Westphalia, Germany

Religious life
- Religion: Roman Catholicism

Senior posting
- Period in office: 2009–2022
- Predecessor: Nirmala Joshi
- Successor: Mary Joseph Michael

Mary Prema Pierick, MC (born 13 May 1953), is a German religious sister and the former Superior General of the Missionaries of Charity of Calcutta, India, the religious institute founded by the Saint Mother Teresa of Calcutta.

== Biography ==
Pierick was born Mechthild Pierick in a farming community in Reken, Germany. In 1980, after reading the biography of the foundress, Something Beautiful for God by Malcolm Muggeridge, she went to meet Mother Teresa in Berlin. She felt called to join her work and moved to India to join the Missionaries of Charity.

Pierick eventually became the Regional Superior of the institute for the sisters in Europe. She returned to India to supervise the tertianship program of the institute, the last stage of training before the perpetual vows. She succeeded Sister Nirmala Joshi as Superior General on 24 March 2009, heading an organisation which had over 5,000 members worldwide at that time.

Catholic Church titles
Preceded by Sister Nirmala Joshi, MC	Superior General of the Missionaries of Charity; 2009–2022	Succeeded by Sister Mary Joseph Michael, MC
