= Coffee Airport =

Airport under construction in Colombia

Coffee Airport Aeropuerto del Café
- IATA: MZL; ICAO: none

Summary
- Airport type: Public
- Owner/Operator: Department of Caldas
- Serves: Manizales, Caldas, Colombia
- Location: Palestina, Caldas
- Opened: 2023 (expected), 2024 (scheduled)
- Elevation AMSL: 1,526 m (5,007 ft)
- Coordinates: 05°02′10.15″N 75°36′56.31″W
- Website: aeropuertodelcafe.com.co
- Interactive map of Coffee Airport

The Coffee Airport (Spanish: Aeropuerto del Café or AeroCafé) is an under construction international airport in the town of Palestina, Caldas, Colombia. It is planned to replace La Nubia Airport, that currently serves the city of Manizales and the Colombian coffee growing axis region at large.

== History ==
In March 9, 2021, the National Council of Political and Social Economy ("CONPES" for its acronym in Spanish) authorized the construction of the first phase of the airport declaring it as strategically important for the nation.

Luis Carlos Velásquez Cardona, the Governor of the Department of Caldas, expects the construction of the first phase of the airport to be completed by the end of the 2023 calendar year.

== Name ==
Due to its location in the heart of the Colombian coffee growing axis, the airport has been christened as the Aeropuerto del Café, or AeroCafé, in homage to the production of fine coffee of the region.

== Airlines and destinations ==
In addition to replacing La Nubia Airport and acquiring its currently served destinations, the airport's better-suited location will allow it to serve international and trans-Atlantic destinations on wide-body aircraft.

== See also ==
- La Nubia Airport
- List of airports in Colombia
