= Gustav Vietor Tower =

Coordinates: 50°6′30″N 8°8′7″E

The Gustav Vietor Tower was one of the earliest steel lattice observation towers to be built in Germany. Constructed of stone and steel in 1882–3 on the Hohe Wurzel mountain near Wiesbaden in Hesse, the 23-metre-tall tower was demolished in 2006, having been closed to visitors 20 years earlier, although it remained in use by radio amateurs.

== Location ==
The tower was situated on the territory of the town of Taunusstein, which is part of the Kreis (district) of Rheingau-Taunus in the Regierungsbezirk (administrative region) of Darmstadt in Hesse, central west Germany.

== See also ==
- Gillerberg Observation Tower
- Gross Reken Melchenberg Radio Tower
- Schomberg Observation Tower
- Utbremen Radio Tower
