= Palestina, Caldas =

- Municipality and town
- Flag

- Location of the municipality and town of Palestina, Caldas in the Caldas Department of Colombia.

- Location in Colombia
- Coordinates: 5°1′13.91″N 75°37′20.7″W
- Country: Colombia
- Department: Caldas Department

Area
  - Total: 118 km^{2} (46 sq mi)
- Elevation: 1,630 m (5,350 ft)

Population (Census 2018)
  - Total: 13,560
  - Density: 115/km^{2} (298/sq mi)
- Time zone: UTC-5 (Colombia Standard Time)

Palestina is a town in the south central region of the state of Caldas, Colombia. Located in the Triangle of Coffee Area, with a culture and tradition related to the colonization of Antioquia and the coffee growing. Because of this, the historic center of the town and surrounding rural areas were named part of the "Coffee Cultural Landscape" UNESCO World Heritage Site in 2011.

Palestina's airport "Aeropuerto del Café", enables export cargo especially given the proximity to the city of Manizales (important industrial center), the diversity of agriculture and agribusiness in its area of influence – municipalities comprising the departments of Risaralda, Caldas, Quindio and the north of Valle del Cauca.

This town has very different climatic zones, because its territory is from the banks of the Cauca River, to the county seat located at the top of the mountain.

== Climate ==
Climate data for Palestina (Santagueda), elevation 1,010 m (3,310 ft), (1971–2000)
Month	Jan	Feb	Mar	Apr	May	Jun	Jul	Aug	Sep	Oct	Nov	Dec	Year
Mean daily maximum °C (°F)	30.1 (86.2)	30.3 (86.5)	30.4 (86.7)	29.7 (85.5)	29.1 (84.4)	29.1 (84.4)	29.7 (85.5)	29.9 (85.8)	29.4 (84.9)	28.6 (83.5)	28.7 (83.7)	29.3 (84.7)	29.5 (85.1)
Daily mean °C (°F)	22.8 (73.0)	23.1 (73.6)	23.4 (74.1)	23.2 (73.8)	22.8 (73.0)	22.8 (73.0)	22.9 (73.2)	23.0 (73.4)	22.7 (72.9)	22.3 (72.1)	22.3 (72.1)	22.5 (72.5)	22.8 (73.0)
Mean daily minimum °C (°F)	17.2 (63.0)	17.5 (63.5)	17.8 (64.0)	18.0 (64.4)	18.0 (64.4)	17.7 (63.9)	17.0 (62.6)	17.3 (63.1)	17.4 (63.3)	17.5 (63.5)	17.7 (63.9)	17.5 (63.5)	17.5 (63.5)
Average precipitation mm (inches)	110.3 (4.34)	125.7 (4.95)	160.1 (6.30)	223.2 (8.79)	268.7 (10.58)	182.7 (7.19)	143.6 (5.65)	164.2 (6.46)	203.4 (8.01)	238.8 (9.40)	224.7 (8.85)	124.3 (4.89)	2,169.7 (85.42)
Average precipitation days	13	14	17	20	22	19	16	17	19	21	20	16	214
Average relative humidity (%)	74	73	73	76	77	77	74	74	75	77	77	76	75
Mean monthly sunshine hours	198.4	161.1	164.3	144.0	142.6	144.0	189.1	179.8	156.0	142.6	156.0	176.7	1,954.6
Mean daily sunshine hours	6.4	5.7	5.3	4.8	4.6	4.8	6.1	5.8	5.2	4.6	5.2	5.7	5.4
Source: Instituto de Hidrologia Meteorologia y Estudios Ambientales
