= Manizales =

- Municipality and city
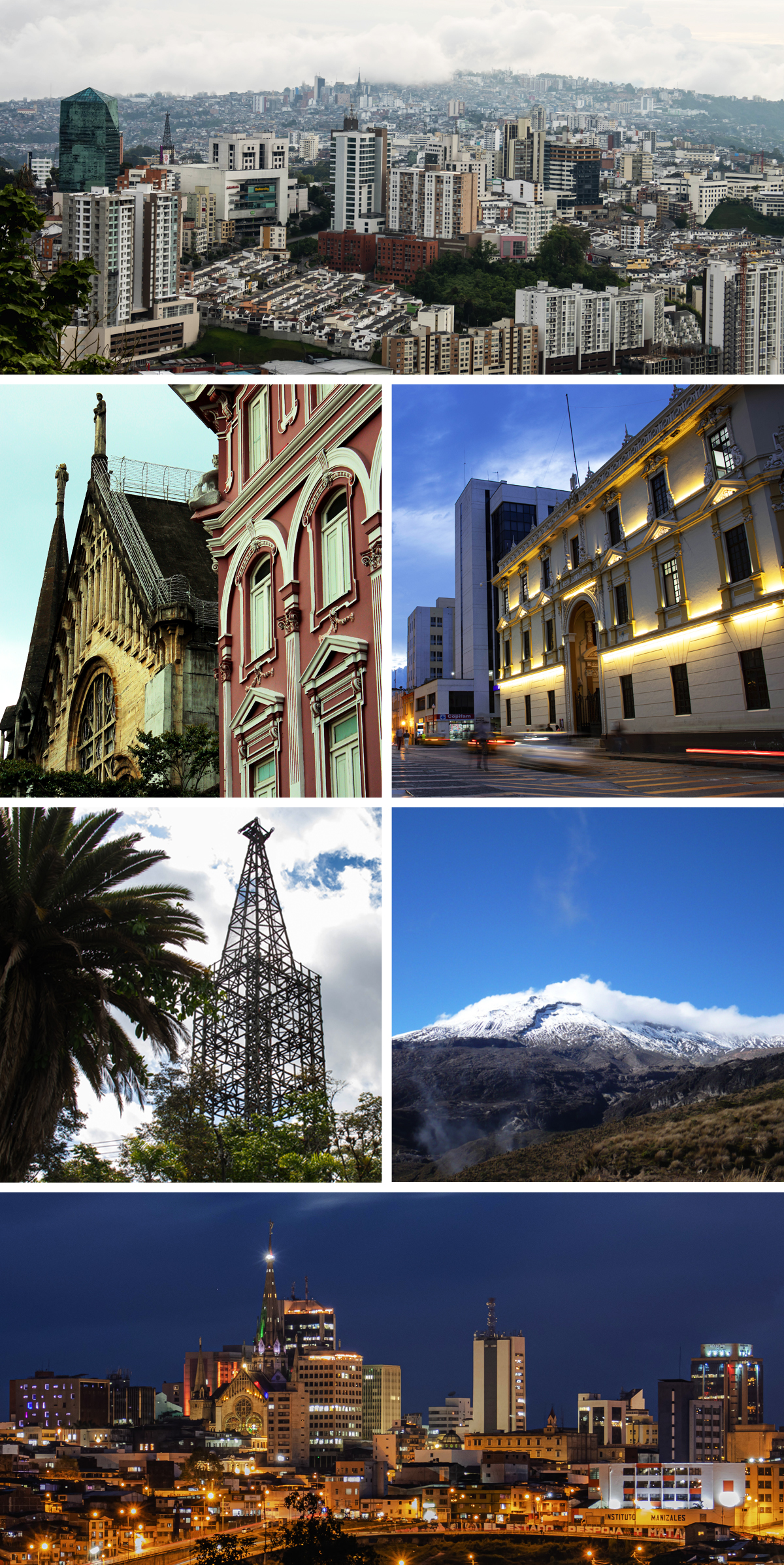
- From top to bottom and from left to right: Manizales from the Cerro de Oro, western side of the Manizales Cathedral and Sanz Building, Yellow Palace of the Government of Caldas, Herveo Tower, Nevado del Ruiz and Manizales Center.

- Flag Coat of arms
- Nickname: "Capital Mundial del café"
- Motto(s): La ciudad de las puertas abiertas (The city of open doors); Capital mundial del café (World capital of coffee)
- Location of the city and municipality of Manizales in the Department of Caldas

- Location in Colombia
- Coordinates: 5°04′03″N 75°30′36″W
- Country: Colombia
- Region: Andean Region
- Department: Caldas
- Foundation: October 12, 1849

Government
  - Mayor: Jorge Eduardo Rojas Giraldo

Area
  - Municipality and city: 571.84 km^{2} (220.79 sq mi)
  - Urban: 37.43 km^{2} (14.45 sq mi)
- Elevation: 2,160 m (7,090 ft)

Population (2018)
  - Municipality and city: 434,403
  - Density: 759.66/km^{2} (1,967.5/sq mi)
  - Urban: 405,234
  - Urban density: 10,830/km^{2} (28,040/sq mi)
  - Metro: 552,155
- Demonym: Manizaleño/Manizalita
- Time zone: UTC-05 (Eastern Time Zone)
- Postal code: 170001-17
- Area code: 57 + 6
- Website: Official website (in Spanish)

Manizales (Spanish pronunciation: [maniˈsales]) is a city in central Colombia. It is the capital of the Department of Caldas, and lies near the Nevado del Ruiz volcano.

Currently, the city is the main center for the production of Colombian coffee and an important hub for higher educational institutions.

== History ==
Manizales was founded on October 12, 1849. The city was founded by a group of twenty Antioquians (The Expedition of the 20), who came from Neira and Salamina.

== Geography ==
Manizales is the capital city of one of the smallest Colombian departments. The city is described as having an "abrupt topography", and lies on the Colombian Central Mountain Range (part of the longest continental mountain range, the Andes), with a great deal of ridgelines and steep slopes, which, combined with the seismic instability of the area, has required architectural adaptations and public works to make the city safer. Even though Manizales has this very difficult topography, there are many coffee plantations in its fertile lands. The city is located in the northern part of the Colombian Coffee-Growers Axis ("Eje Cafetero"), near the volcano Nevado del Ruiz, which has an altitude of 5,321 meters (17,457.3 ft).

It is in the basin of the Chinchiná River and sub-basin of the Guacaica River. Its natural threats are earthquakes, mudslides, and volcanic eruptions.

== Climate ==
Under the Köppen climate classification, Manizales is Cfb, a subtropical highland climate but ever moist. Lower elevations approach an equatorial climate (Af) as found in the plains. Despite being located in the tropics, the city seldom gets very hot, featuring spring-like temperatures throughout the year owing to its high altitude. There are only two seasons in the city: the wet and dry seasons that alternate throughout the year, with each lasting about three months. Monthly averages are quite uniform. Manizales receives about 1,500 millimetres (59 in) of precipitation a year, with October being wettest.

Climate data for Manizales (La Nubia Airport), elevation 2,058 m (6,752 ft), (1981–2010)
Month	Jan	Feb	Mar	Apr	May	Jun	Jul	Aug	Sep	Oct	Nov	Dec	Year
Record high °C (°F)	27.0 (80.6)	28.5 (83.3)	27.0 (80.6)	27.4 (81.3)	32.0 (89.6)	26.0 (78.8)	26.2 (79.2)	28.0 (82.4)	26.4 (79.5)	26.0 (78.8)	27.0 (80.6)	27.4 (81.3)	32.0 (89.6)
Mean daily maximum °C (°F)	21.5 (70.7)	22.0 (71.6)	21.8 (71.2)	21.4 (70.5)	21.3 (70.3)	21.3 (70.3)	21.5 (70.7)	21.7 (71.1)	21.2 (70.2)	20.6 (69.1)	20.6 (69.1)	21.1 (70.0)	21.3 (70.3)
Daily mean °C (°F)	16.9 (62.4)	17.2 (63.0)	17.2 (63.0)	17.2 (63.0)	17.2 (63.0)	17.1 (62.8)	17.2 (63.0)	17.2 (63.0)	16.9 (62.4)	16.6 (61.9)	16.6 (61.9)	16.8 (62.2)	17.0 (62.6)
Mean daily minimum °C (°F)	11.8 (53.2)	12.1 (53.8)	12.5 (54.5)	12.8 (55.0)	12.8 (55.0)	12.8 (55.0)	12.5 (54.5)	12.6 (54.7)	12.5 (54.5)	12.4 (54.3)	12.3 (54.1)	12.2 (54.0)	12.4 (54.3)
Record low °C (°F)	6.0 (42.8)	7.0 (44.6)	8.2 (46.8)	6.3 (43.3)	8.2 (46.8)	8.6 (47.5)	7.4 (45.3)	7.0 (44.6)	8.6 (47.5)	1.3 (34.3)	7.0 (44.6)	7.6 (45.7)	1.3 (34.3)
Average precipitation mm (inches)	103.5 (4.07)	94.0 (3.70)	133.9 (5.27)	176.2 (6.94)	161.9 (6.37)	108.9 (4.29)	74.2 (2.92)	74.2 (2.92)	139.8 (5.50)	209.0 (8.23)	176.5 (6.95)	131.5 (5.18)	1,583.7 (62.35)
Average precipitation days	14	15	20	23	24	20	18	17	21	24	21	17	229
Average relative humidity (%)	83	81	83	84	84	84	81	81	84	86	86	84	83
Mean monthly sunshine hours	167.4	138.4	124.0	102.0	108.5	120.0	148.8	139.5	114.0	105.4	117.0	142.6	1,527.6
Mean daily sunshine hours	5.4	4.9	4.0	3.4	3.5	4.0	4.8	4.5	3.8	3.4	3.9	4.6	4.2
Source: Instituto de Hidrologia Meteorologia y Estudios Ambientales

== Economy ==
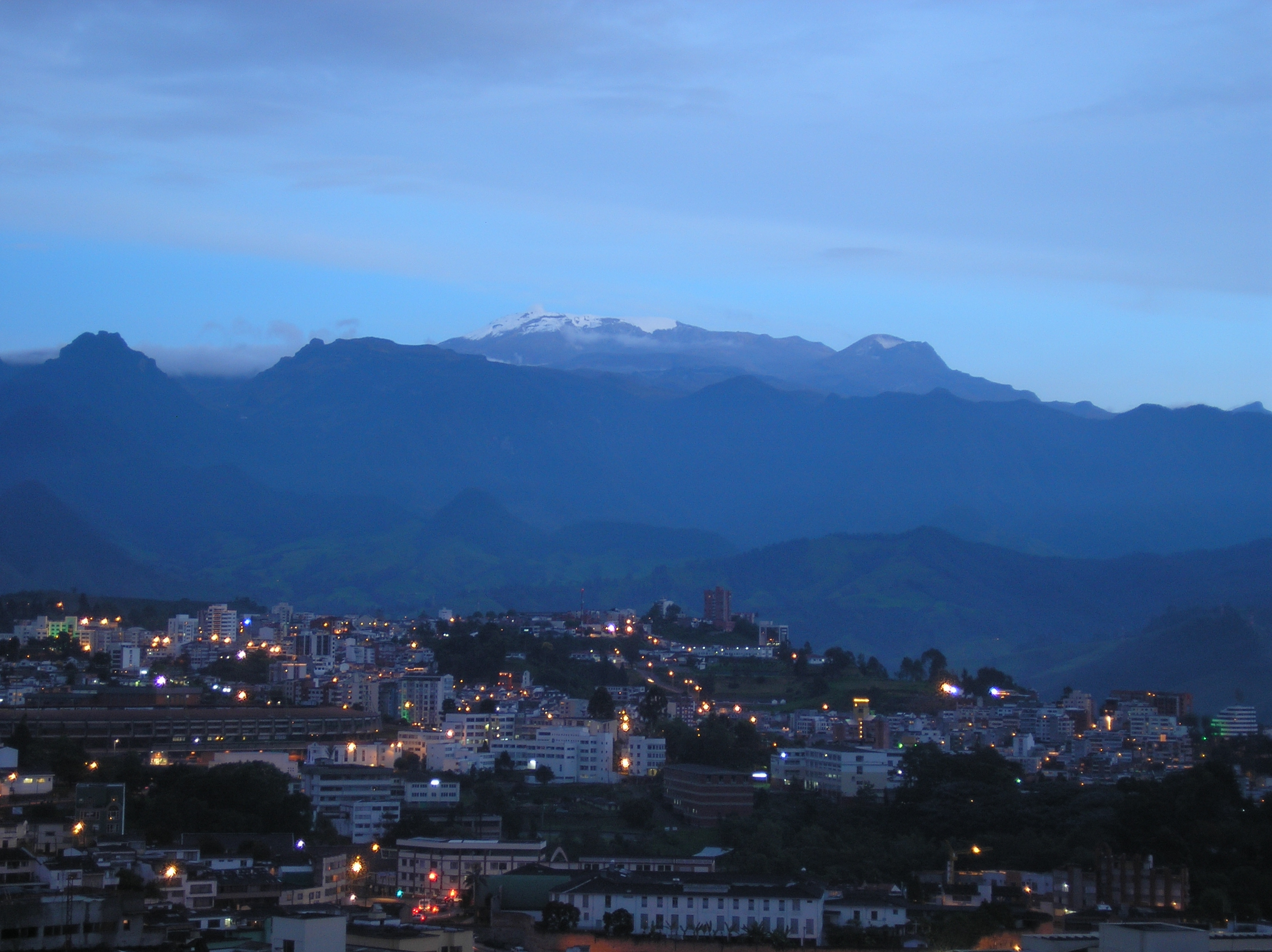
The Nevado del Ruiz of Los Nevados National Park seen from the city

Its core economy has traditionally been the cultivation and production of coffee. This fomented the creation of new types of employment and several factories, some of which remain in the metropolitan area while others have reduced their operations or moved to other cities aggravating the unemployment problem. These companies manufacture products such as liquor, shoes, rubber, chocolate, banks, detergents and soaps, threshing and packaged coffee, software, and metallurgy, among others. In addition, there are institutions and companies involved in the coffee sector as the Departmental Committee of Coffee Growers of Caldas, Almacafé, Cenicafé, and a number of other industries involved in the process of coffee (threshers, cooperatives, exporters).

During the latter half of the twentieth century, many universities were founded in the city to the point that some studies regard Manizales as the second largest University city in the country. The universities are attended by students from various regions of the country such as Tolima, Risaralda, Valle, Quindio, Antioquia, Nariño and Huila, among others.

The service sector has thrived, mostly in the form of call centers, and this has become one of the city's primary economic activities.

Manizales won first place in the special category of business promotion in the V Iberoamerican Digital Cities Award, organized by the Latin American Association of Research Centers and Telecommunication Enterprises (AHCIET). In a 2010 study conducted by the World Bank, Manizales was ranked as the best and easiest Colombian city to do business.

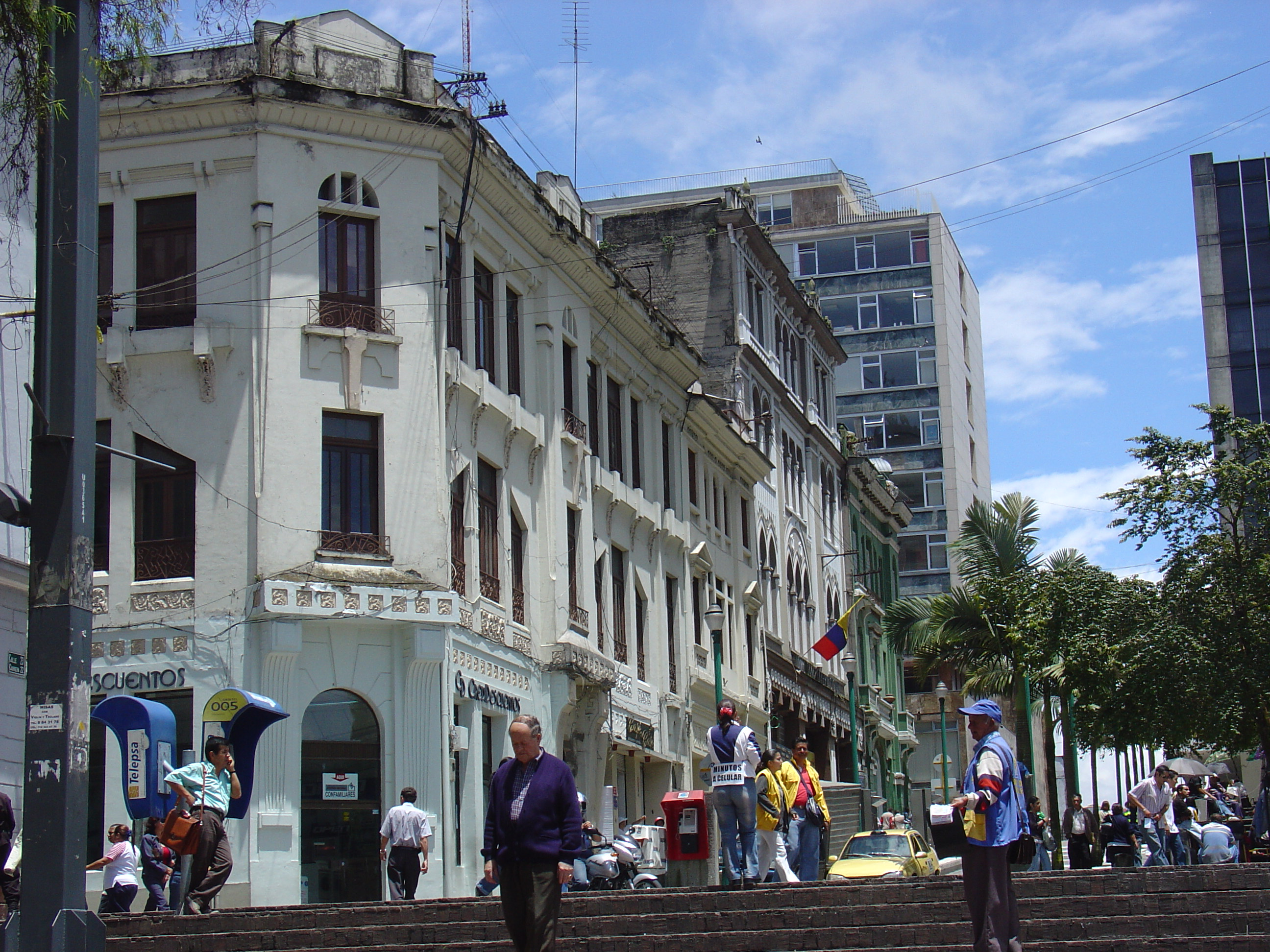
Street of Manizales near the major square

== Infrastructure ==
=== Main roads ===
The city's mountainous topography causes journeying in an east–west direction and vice versa to be flatter and faster than going north–south or south–north; therefore the main parallel thoroughfares are the Santander, Paralela, and Kevin Ángel, and are arranged longitudinally most of the city's length. The few avenues with a north–south or south–north are the Avenida Centenario and Avenida 12 de Octubre; the former is more important, for it connects downtown with the main transport hub where major access routes merge towards the city.

- Avenida Santander was the first main road of the city, formerly called Cervantes, and remains the most important motorway of the city. Its four lanes travel in the east–west–east direction. This roadway spans the entire Carrera-23 in the downtown area all the way to Calle 71 in the Battalion sector. Surrounding it are some of the most important landmarks of the city such as: Founders Theatre, Plaza 51, The Triangle, Panorama Towers, University of Caldas, Catholic University, Cervantes Building, Park Antonio Nariño, Instituto Universitario de Caldas, Herbeo Tower, General Cable Plaza and the Zona Rosa.
- Avenida Paralela was the city's second main road. It also has four lanes moving between west and east, and as its name attests, it runs parallel to Avenida Santander. This road spans from downtown to Calle 71 in the Palermo neighborhood. It passes by some iconic places such as San Estéban Cemetery, University of Caldas, Palogrande Stadium.
- Avenida Alberto Mendoza Hoyos
- Avenida Kevin Ángel
- Avenida Panamericana

=== Manizales Aerial Tramway ===
Manizales Gondola Lift was inaugurated on October 30, 2009. It connects downtown Manizales with the regional bus station, with a length of 2.1 km (1.3 mi). Each gondola has a seating capacity of ten passengers, the whole system can carry 2,100 persons per hour. Owing to its success, the gondola lift was extended in 2013, and now connects also the suburb of Villamaria.

The entire Aerial Tramway was built by the Italian manufacturer Leitner ropeways. Currently it has four stations on its route: Downtown Manizales, La Fuente, Manizales Los Cambulos Bus Terminal, and Villamaria.

=== Air transportation ===
Manizales has a domestic airport called La Nubia Airport which has a runway of about 1,400 meters and provides services from 6 am to 6 pm. Due to foggy weather conditions, it is often closed due to low visibility. Meanwhile, the existence of buildings over two stories close to the landing head make it topographically unfeasible to expand the airport, which in turn has become an obstacle to regional development; For these reasons, the International Coffee Airport is being built within the metropolitan area, in the town of Palestina, 25 minutes from Manizales. At an altitude of 1,525 m, the airport will have a runway of 2,800 meters which could be extended to 3,500 meters in order to receive long-range aircraft. It is expected that the new airport will function 24/7. It is currently being studied for its adequacy in terms of ground motion.

== Arts and culture ==
The most important cultural events held in the city are the Manizales International Theater Festival, which is one of the major theater events in Latin America created in 1968 by initiative of Carlos Ariel Betancur, and the Manizales Jazz Festival, which gathers jazz musicians from all over the world; both are held annually.

The Manizales Fair was created in 1951 on the first centenary of the city. It began with bullfights and the typical "Manolas" parade (Spanish procession). Due to its hospitality, more shows and presentations have been brought into the fair, such as the International Coffee Beauty Pageant which together with the bullfighting season are the main events of the fair. Currently the fair includes activities such as horseback riding parades, artisanal fairs, "trova" concerts, other parades, sports, national and international musicians and bands, horse and livestock contests, and cultural shows. It is an important celebration in Colombia, as is the Barranquilla Carnival.

=== Coffee International Beauty Pageant ===
Coffee International Beauty Pageant (from Spanish: Reinado Internacional del Café) is an international beauty pageant held annually in Manizales as part of the Feria de Manizales, a feast promoting the region known for its flagship product, coffee.

The current winner is Aleksandra Klepaczka, from Poland.

The international beauty contest originally began in 1957 and was held every two years (1957, 1959, 1961, 1963) under the name of Continental Queen of Coffee. However, to give a wider scope, in 1972 its name was changed to Miss International Queen of Coffee Pageant, thereby increasing the participation of coffee-producing countries from other continents. Manizales is the permanent home since its inception.

=== Other events ===
- Annual Fair of Manizales (Feria de Manizales) [January]
- Bullfighting Season of Manizales [January]
- International Coffee Beauty Pageant [January]
- Image Festival [April]
- International Theater Festival [September/October]
- Manizales Jazz Festival [September/October]
- Manizales Grita Rock Fest [October]

== Attractions ==
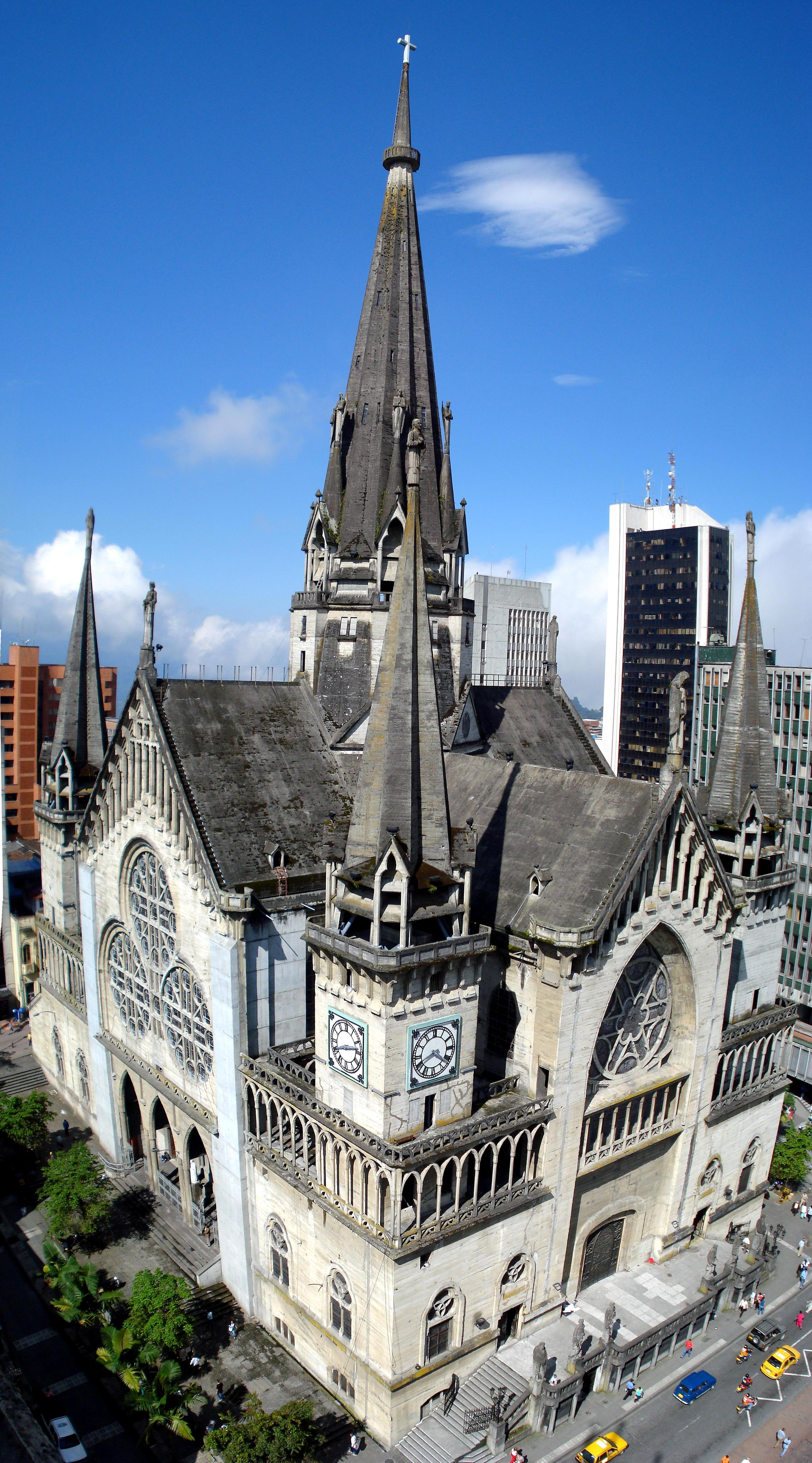
The Cathedral of Manizales, a neo-Gothic church

- Gold museum of the Banco de la Republica
- Museum of Natural History Universidad de Caldas
- Museum of Art Universidad de Caldas
- Archaeological Museum Universidad de Caldas
- Botanical Garden Universidad de Caldas
- Natural Museum of Histories CC
- Museum of Science and Games Universidad Nacional de Colombia

=== Tourism ===
- Cathedral of Manizales, the third tallest in Latin America, at 113 meters
- Nevado del Ruiz Natural Park (with caves and snow)
- Manizales - Mariquita Cableway
- Thoughts Recinct Park (El Recinto del Pensamiento)
- Los Yarumos Ecological Park
- Ruiz Hot Springs ("Thermal Waters")
- Otoño Hot Springs ("Thermal Waters")
- La Rochela Resort
- Santagueda Resort
- Simon Bolivar square
- Bosque Popular park
- (Francisco Jose de) Caldas Park
- Manizales Country Club of Golf
- Hacienda Venecia - Coffee Plantation tour, accommodation, swimming pool

== Sports ==
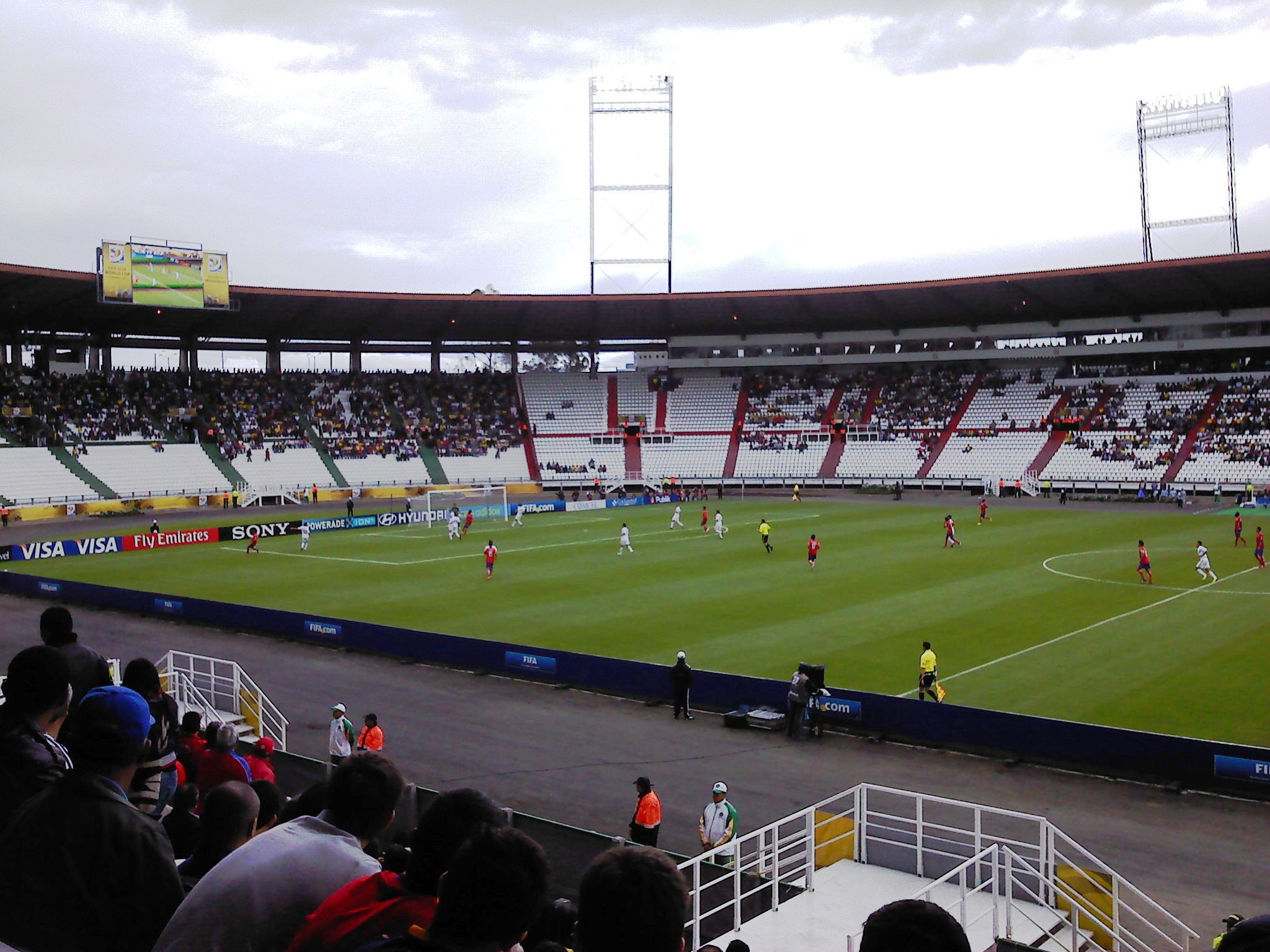
CRC Palogrande Stadium – ESP 2011

Manizales has several sports centers, the main one being in the area of the Palogrande Stadium. The city has a professional football team, Once Caldas, which is housed in the Palogrande Stadium, winner of the prestigious South American Copa Libertadores 2004, and 4-time champion of Category First A of Colombia, ranking eighth in the tournament's history. Manizales has also had two professional basketball teams Caldas Bancafetero Aces and Wise Caldas which were champions of the Colombian Professional Basketball tournament in 1989 and 2000 respectively, both played in the Coliseo Mayor Jorge Arango Uribe. The city also has indoor soccer presence through the futsal cup microfútbol in both male with Real Caldas FS and female with Real Caldas, and the FIFA Futsal League in Club Deportivo Linear which won the 2011-II championship, all these are played in the Coliseo Menor Vargas Ramón Marín venue.

Manizales has also been home to sporting events such as the Fourth National Games in 1936, South American Football U-20 in 1987, the Copa America 2001, the South American U-20 2005 and most importantly World Cup 2011 U-20.

== Education ==
Manizales is an important regional cultural and educational center. It has more universities per capita than any other city in Colombia. The city has a student population of some 30,000 that attend 7 colleges and universities:

- Universidad Nacional de Colombia
- Universidad de Manizales
- Corporación Universitaria Remington
- Universidad Autónoma de Manizales
- Universidad Católica de Manizales
- Universidad Luis Amigó
- Universidad de Caldas

== Twin towns – sister cities ==
Manizales is twinned with:

- Bayamón, Puerto Rico
- Benidorm, Spain
- (Republic of Ireland) Cork, Ireland
- Miami, United States
- Rosario, Argentina
- San Luis Potosí, Mexico
- Soyapango, El Salvador
- Liberland

== See also ==
- 1999 Armenia earthquake
