= La Nubia Airport =

La Nubia Airport Aeropuerto La Nubia
- IATA: MZL; ICAO: SKMZ

Summary
- Airport type: Public
- Owner/Operator: InfiCaldas
- Serves: Manizales, Colombia
- Location: La Nubia
- Elevation AMSL: 6,768 ft / 2,063 m
- Coordinates: 5°01′48″N 75°27′50″W

Map
- Location of airport in Colombia

Runways
Direction	Length		Surface
Direction	m	ft	Surface
10/28	1,475	4,839	Asphalt
- Source: GCM

La Nubia Airport (IATA: MZL, ICAO: SKMZ) is an airport serving Manizales, Colombia, 8 kilometres (5 mi) southeast of the city's downtown.

Due to its short runway and limited ramp space, the only aircraft that can use the airport are turbopropeller aircraft such as the Fokker 50, ATR 72, and Dash 8. The main problem of La Nubia airport is weather. Sometimes shut down due to fog, rain, or winds, it is difficult for airlines to offer a reliable schedule for the passengers wishing to visit Manizales and Caldas. Combined with its daylight-only hours of operation and limited runway length, La Nubia has been seen as an obstacle to the region's development.

== Airlines and destinations ==
Airlines	Destinations
Clic	Bogotá, Cartagena, Medellín–Olaya Herrera

== See also ==
- Coffee Airport
- List of airports in Colombia
