= Reken =

- Municipality
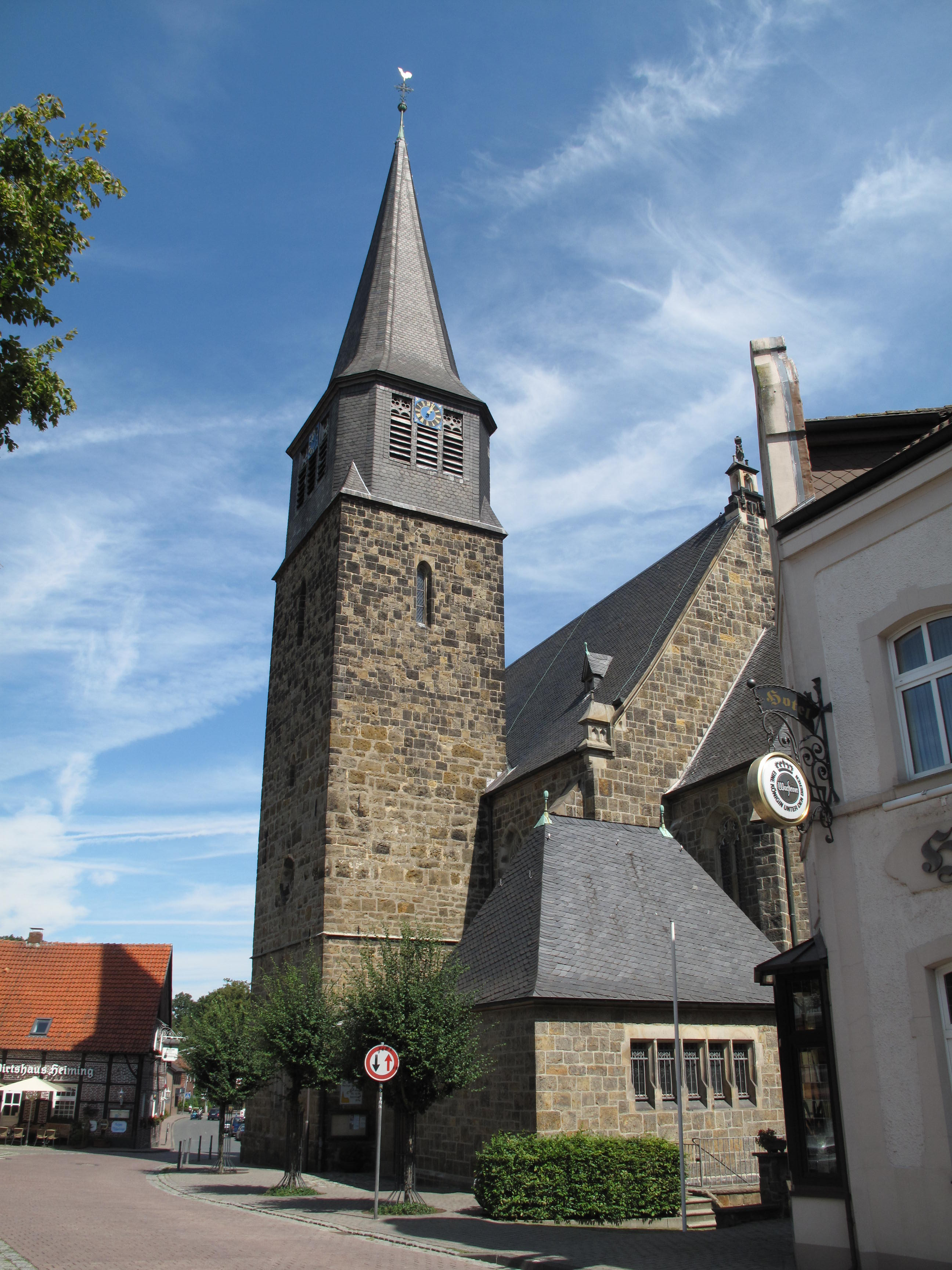
- Church of Saint Anthony in Klein Reken

- Coat of arms

- Location of Reken within Borken district
- Interactive map of Reken
- Location within Germany Location within North Rhine-Westphalia
- Coordinates: 51°50′0″N 7°2′40″E
- Country: Germany
- State: North Rhine-Westphalia
- Admin. region: Münster
- District: Borken
- Subdivisions: 5

Government
  - Mayor (2020–25): Manuel Deitert (CDU)

Area
  - Total: 77 km^{2} (30 sq mi)
- Elevation: 60–133 m (197–436 ft)

Population (2025-12-31)
  - Total: 14,937
  - Density: 190/km^{2} (500/sq mi)
- Time zone: UTC+01:00 (CET)
  - Summer (DST): UTC+02:00 (CEST)
- Postal codes: 48734
- Dialling codes: 0 28 64
- Vehicle registration: BOR
- Website: www.reken.de

Reken is a municipality in the district of Borken, in North Rhine-Westphalia, Germany. It is located approximately 15 km east of Borken.

Sister Mary Prema hails from this municipality.

== Population ==
Historical population

Year	Pop.	±% p.a.
1965	9,503	—
1970	9,592	+0.19%
1975	10,481	+1.79%
1980	11,489	+1.85%
1985	11,712	+0.39%
1990	11,689	−0.04%
1995	12,754	+1.76%

Year	Pop.	±% p.a.
2000	13,838	+1.64%
2005	14,315	+0.68%
2010	14,094	−0.31%
2015	14,532	+0.61%
2020	14,965	+0.59%
2025	14,937	−0.04%

Source: Landesdatabank Nordrhein-Westfalen
