= Gross Reken Melchenberg Radio Tower =

- Funkturm Melchenberg
- Location within Germany

General information
- Type: Lattice radio tower
- Location: Reken, North Rhine-Westphalia, Germany, Germany
- Coordinates: 51°50′20″N 7°2′21″E

Height
- Antenna spire: 70 m (230 ft)

Gross Reken Melchenberg Radio Tower (German: Funkturm Melchenberg "Melchenberg Radio Tower"), or simply the Melchenberg Radio Tower, is a German concrete radio tower that is located in the municipality of Reken, in the state of North Rhine-Westphalia. Like the Melchenberg Observation Tower, it is a lattice tower that is currently being used as means of communication. Although its construction date is unknown, it was formerly used by the military. Its antenna's height is 70 metres long.

== Geography ==
The Melchenberg Radio Tower is situated alongside the Melchenberg Observation Tower in the municipality of Reken, which is located in the populous state of North Rhine-Westphalia. Its postal code is 48734.

== See also ==
- Lattice tower
- Schomberg Observation Tower
- Gillerberg Observation Tower
- Gustav-Vietor-Tower
- Madona Radio Towers
- Reken
- North Rhine-Westphalia
