= Herveo =

Coordinates: 5°5′N 75°10′W

- Municipality and town
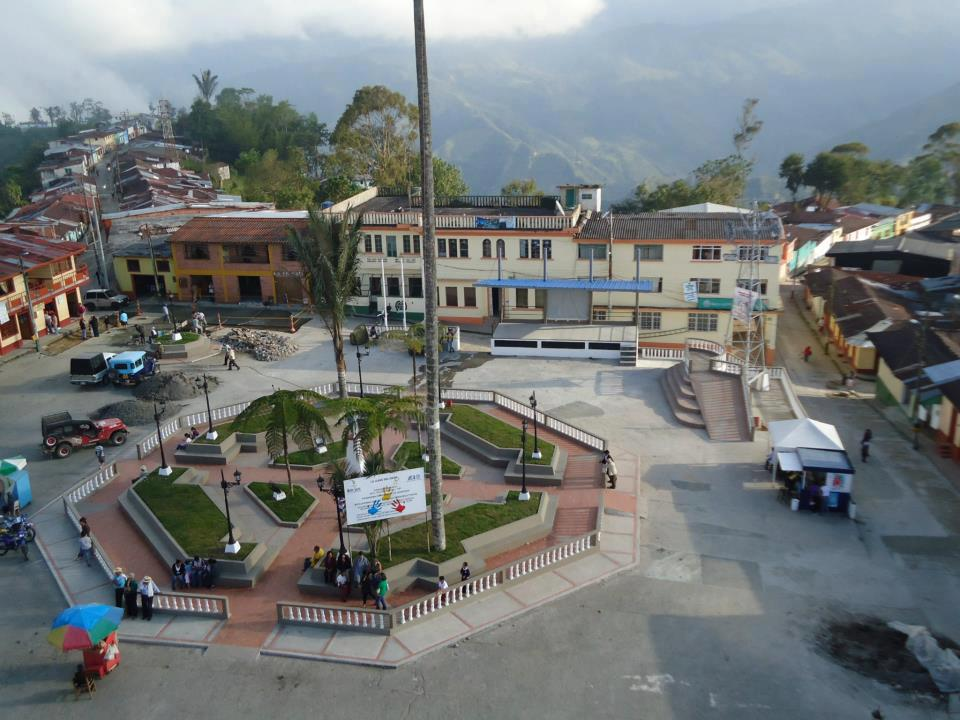

- Flag Coat of arms

- Location of the municipality and town of Herveo in the Tolima Department of Colombia.
- Country: Colombia
- Department: Tolima Department

Area
  - Total: 342 km^{2} (132 sq mi)
- Elevation: 2,250 m (7,380 ft)

Population (2017)
  - Total: 7,893
- Time zone: UTC-5 (Colombia Standard Time)

Herveo (Spanish pronunciation: [eɾˈβeo]) is a town and municipality in the Tolima department of Colombia. The population of the municipality was 10,292 as of the 1993 census.
