= Schomberg Observation Tower =

Coordinates: 51°14′17″N 8°0′15″E

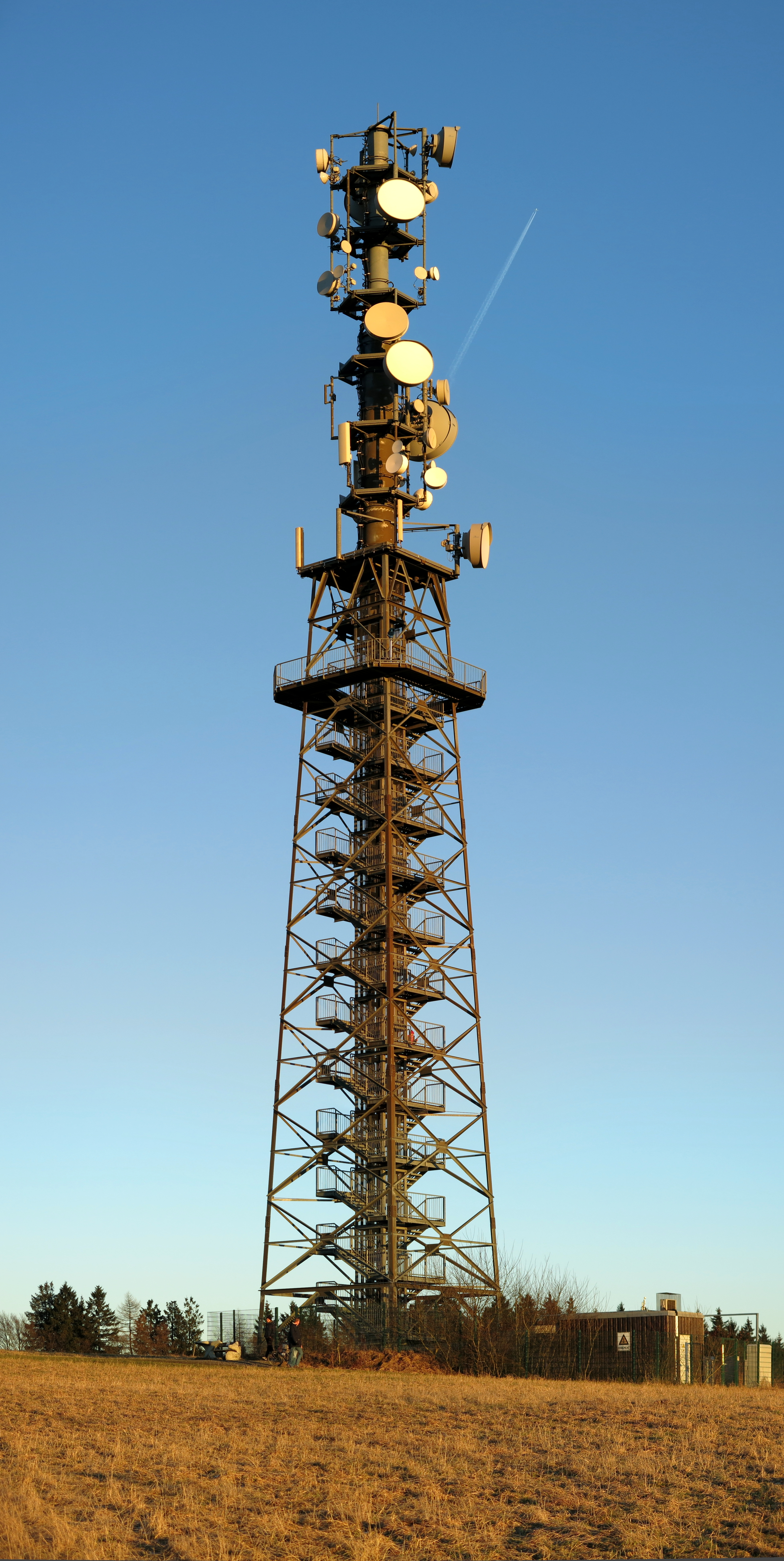

Schomberg Observation Tower is a German observation tower that was constructed in 2005 and was finished in 2006. It is a steel truss tower that is used for observation, at the same time, used for mobile phone services. The tower is 60 meters high, including the antenna. It has an observation deck in 30 meters height.

== History ==
The Schomberg Observation Tower is a German steel lattice observation tower that was built in 2005 and was finished in 2006. Used for observation and mobile phone communication, the tower can be visited daily during the summer months and also in winter, depending on the weather. Visitors can view the surrounding Sauerland region.

== Geography ==
The Schomberg Observation Tower is located in the town of Sundern, in the kreis (district) of Hochsauerland, in the state of North Rhine-Westphalia. Its postal code is 59846.

== See also ==
- Lattice tower
- Utbremen Radio Tower
- Gross Reken Melchenberg Radio Tower
- Gillerberg Observation Tower
- Madona Radio Towers
