= Madona Radio Towers =

Buildings in Latvia

- Madonas Radio Torņi
- Location within Latvia

General information
- Type: Lattice radio towers
- Location: Madona, Vidzeme, Latvia, Latvia
- Coordinates: 56.8553°N 26.2205°E
- Construction started: 1932
- Completed: 1932
- Demolished: 1944

Height
- Antenna spire: 116 m (381 ft)

Design and construction
- Engineer: Remberts Martinsons
- Structural engineer: Jānis Linters

The Madona Radio Towers (Latvian: Madonas Radio Torņi "Madona Radio Towers") were two wooden Latvian radio towers in the town of Madona that were constructed and finished in the year 1932. The Madona radio towers were used as means of communication from 1932, the year the towers were constructed, until 1944, when it was destroyed by the invading German occupants during World War II. These two towers were also the tallest structures ever built of wood in Latvia and also the tallest wooden towers ever built with triangular cross section. The towers' antenna measured 116 metres above sea level. In addition, the tower had neither a roof nor floors.

== History ==
The Madona Radio Towers were built in 1932 to serve as radio towers in Madona. The towers were built along with the other transmitters and the radio station or centre. The construction of the radio centre and the cable way as a whole was proposed by engineer Jānis Linters. When the construction of the whole cable way was finally commenced in 1932, 10 Latvian men were assigned to the Madona Radio Towers, with radio engineer Remberts Martinsons preparing the plans for the construction. In the same year, the cable way finally finished its half-a-year wide construction, with the Madona Radio Towers being the tallest. The towers were later on dismantled in July 1944 by the invading Nazi German soldiers during the Second World War in 1944.

== Geography ==
The Madona Radio Towers were constructed in the town of Madona, which is located in the municipality of Madona, in Latvia. When the towers were still on service, they were located near the radio station or centre beside the Aiviekste River.

== See also ==
- List of tallest towers in the world
