= Gillerberg Observation Tower =

Coordinates: 50°58′13.6″N 8°9′35.4″E

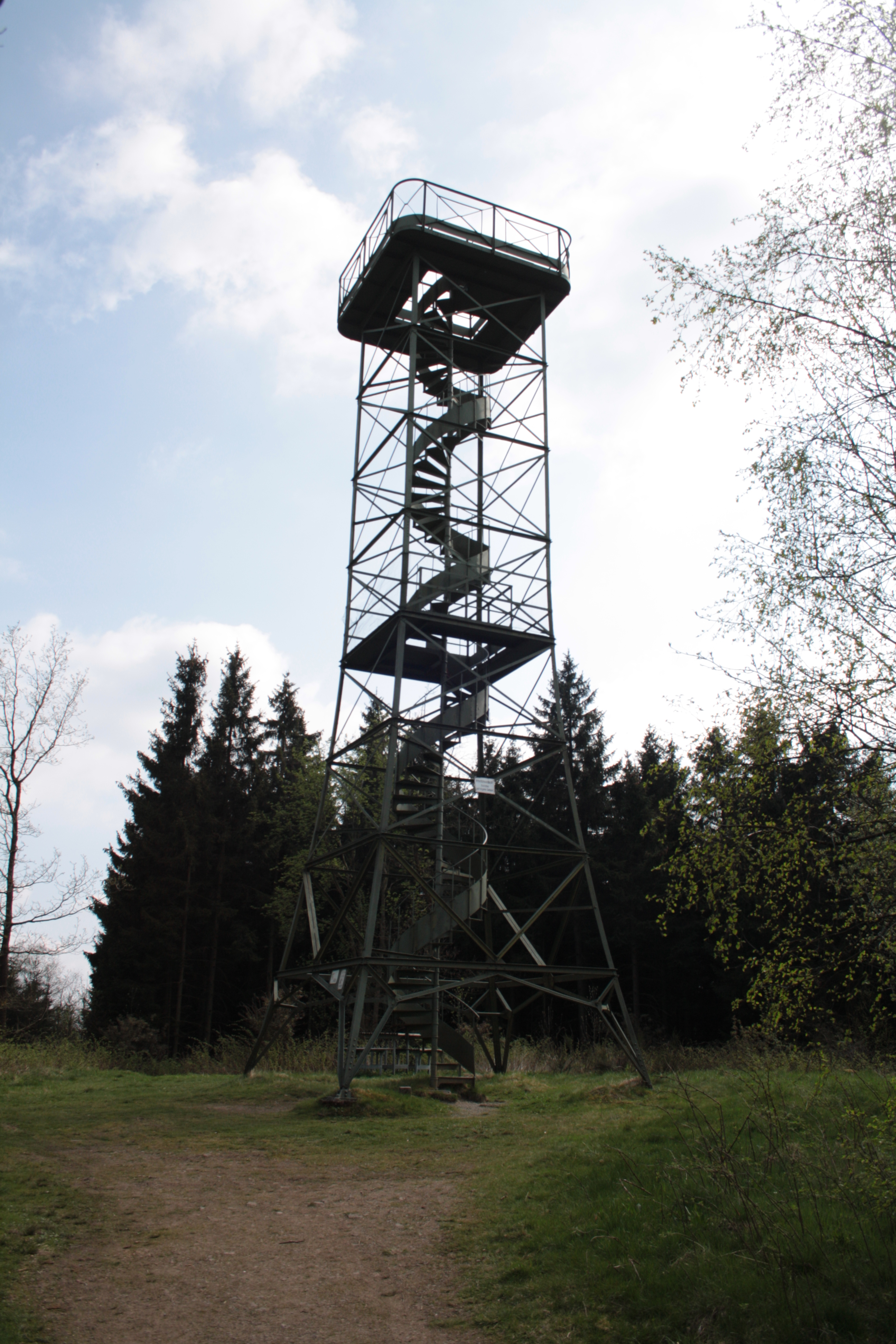
Gillerberg Observation Tower

The Gillerberg Observation Tower (German: Aussichtsturm Gillerberg or Gillerturm) is a German steel lattice observation tower that was built in 1892. The Gillerberg Observation Tower is one of the oldest lattice towers in Germany and was renovated in 2004. The height of its observation deck is 15 metres above the ground.

== History ==
The Gillerberg Observation Tower was built in the town of Hilchenbach in 1892. In 2004, it was renovated and new features were added, such as a new observation deck.

== Geography ==
The Gillerberg is located in the town of Hilchenbach, in the district of Siegen-Wittgenstein, in the state of North Rhine-Westphalia, the most populous state of Germany. Its postal code is 57271.

== See also ==
- Lattice Tower
- Observation deck
- Gross Reken Melchenberg Radio Tower
- Schomberg Observation Tower
- Hilchenbach
