= Alan Cox (radio personality) =

American radio/TV personality

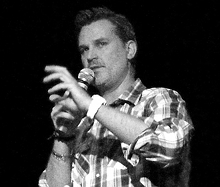
- Occupation: Radio personality
- Years active: 1992–present
- Employer: WMMS in Cleveland
- Website: alancoxshow.com

Alan Cox (born June 23, 1971) is an American radio and television personality. Cox is currently the afternoon-drive host at WMMS (100.7 FM) in Cleveland, Ohio. Prior to Cleveland and Detroit, Cox worked at WKQX in Chicago, and WXDX-FM in Pittsburgh. Cox began his career on stations in Rockford, Illinois, and Kalamazoo, Michigan.

== Early career ==
Alan Cox did stand-up in college and then started his radio career on the Jonathon Brandmeier show at WLUP/Chicago. He moved to Pittsburgh in 1999, starting as an afternoon drive host. In June 2004, The Alan Cox Radio Show was moved to mornings after WXDX's parent company, Clear Channel, dropped The Howard Stern Show. In Pittsburgh, he was noted for his "sharp wit and attitude." He also regularly appeared on WQED-TV's talk show, Off Q. In 2006, he was replaced by a sports-focused show hosted by Tim Benz as part of a shift in direction at the studio.

== Q101 Chicago ==
In August 2006, Cox was hired to return to Chicago for a new morning show at alternative rock station WKQX "Q101", replacing the outgoing Mancow Muller. His co-anchors were James Engel and Ginger Jordan. The show's writers included Michael McCarthy and Aemelia Scott. The show ran Mondays through Fridays from 5:30 to 10 am, beginning on September 18, 2006.

== WMMS ==
In December 2009, Cox began working at WMMS-FM, hosting an comedic afternoon talk show targeted to men 18–34.

On December 16, 2009, The Alan Cox Show premiered in the afternoon slot on WMMS in Cleveland, replacing Maxwell (Ben Bornstein) of The Maxwell Show after contract negotiations fell through between Bornstein and the station. (Coincidentally, Cox and Bornstein nearly worked alongside each other at WXDX-FM in Pittsburgh ten years earlier.) The show aired weekdays from 2-6p EST and was heard live online at www.alancoxshow.com.

Early in the show, Cox's co-hosts were Chad Zumock and Erika Lauren, both new to radio. Erika Lauren started in 2010 after her appearance on MTV's The Real World. "Parma State of Mind", a 2010 parody of the Jay-Z and Alicia Keys song "Empire State of Mind", was criticized for continuing the ethnic jokes aimed at the suburb. The show also drew national attention after holding a book burning party for Fifty Shades of Grey on July 8, 2012. During a 2012 interview with Aerosmith frontman Steven Tyler, the show broke news of the delayed release for Music from Another Dimension!, the band's first studio album in eight years.

On December 3, 2012, it was announced that Zumock was no longer with WMMS after crashing his car, leading to an arrest for driving while intoxicated which violated his contract. On May 3, 2013, Cleveland Scene reported that Zumock had been acquitted of the charge.

Later, he was joined by Bill Squire and Mary Santora. However, they were both laid off in November 2024 due to company-wide layoffs at IHeartRadio.

While at WMMS, Alan was featured in both Talkers and as a cover story for the June 2011 issue of Cleveland Magazine. Scene readers named Alan Cox the best Cleveland radio personality for four straight years, from 2010 to 2014.

== 106.7 WDTW Detroit ==
On November 5, 2012, Cox announced an agreement between him and WMMS owner iHeartMedia to host mornings at classic rock station WDTW-FM/Detroit. Cox hosted the Detroit show from WMMS through voice-tracking, but also said he would occasionally host both shows from WDTW-FM.

Cox was under contract with WDTW & WMMS through 2017. He also served as fill-in host for the nationally syndicated America Now show.
