= Album-oriented rock =

American FM radio format

Album-oriented rock (AOR, originally album-oriented radio) is a radio format created in the United States in the late 1960s that focuses on the full repertoire of rock albums and is currently associated with classic rock.

The format arose when American FM radio stations decided to play tracks by hard rock and progressive rock artists. In the mid-1970s, AOR was characterized by a layered, mellifluous sound and sophisticated production with considerable dependence on melodic hooks. By the early 1980s, research and formal programming had honed the format's commercial appeal, leading to tremendous popularity. In the early 1980s, the abbreviation AOR shifted to "album-oriented rock", meaning music in the classic rock genre recorded in the late 1960s and 1970s.

The term is also commonly conflated with "adult-oriented rock", a radio format that also uses the initialism "AOR" and covers not only album-oriented rock but also album tracks and "deep cuts" from other rock genres, such as soft rock and pop rock.

== History ==
=== Freeform and progressive ===
The album-oriented rock radio format started with programming concepts in the 1960s. The freeform and progressive formats developed the tone for AOR playlists for much of its heyday.

In July 1964, the U.S. Federal Communications Commission (FCC) adopted a non-duplication rule prohibiting FM radio stations from running a simulcast of the programming from their AM counterparts. AM/FM affiliate station owners fought these new regulations, delaying enactment until January 1, 1967.

The freeform format in commercial radio was created to program the FM airwaves inexpensively. Programmers like Tom Donahue at KMPX in San Francisco developed stations where DJs had the freedom to play long sets of music, often covering a variety of genres. Not limited to hits or singles, DJs often played obscure or longer tracks by newer or more adventurous artists rather than those heard on Top 40 stations of the day. This new format caused albums, instead of singles, to be rock's main artistic vehicle in the 1960s and 1970s.

With a few exceptions, commercial freeform had a relatively brief life. With more listeners acquiring FM radios, it became more important for stations to attract larger market share to sell more advertising. By 1970, many of the stations were instituting programming rules with a "clock" and system of "rotation". With this shift, stations' formats in the early 1970s were now billed as progressive. However, DJs still had input over the music they played. The selection was deep and eclectic, with a range of genres.

=== 1970s ===
In October 1971, WPLJ in New York began to shift its freeform progressive rock format into a tighter, hit-oriented rock format similar to what would later become known as AOR. WPLJ's parent company, ABC, installed similar formats on all of its FM stations, including KLOS in Los Angeles and WRIF in Detroit. Gordon McLendon followed suit on his stations, most infamously at WPHD in Buffalo, New York, where McLendon cut over 90% of the station's album library and pushed popular evening jock Jim Santella—whom McLendon did not like—to publicly resign. In 1973, Lee Abrams, formerly at WRIF, successfully installed a similar format, later known as SuperStars, at WQDR in Raleigh, North Carolina.

In 1972, Ron Jacobs, program director at KGB-FM in San Diego, began using detailed listener research and expanded playlists in shifting the Top 40 station toward a progressive rock format. Meanwhile, at competing station KPRI, program director Mike Harrison was similarly applying Top 40 concepts to the progressive format, which he dubbed "album-oriented rock."

In the mid-1970s, as program directors began to exert more control over what songs played on air, progressive stations evolved into the album-oriented rock format. Stations still played longer songs and deep album tracks (rather than just singles). However, program directors and consultants took on a more significant role in song selection, generally limiting airplay to just a few "focus tracks" from a particular album and concentrating on artists with a more "commercial" sound than those featured a few years earlier. Noted DJ "Kid Leo" Travagliante of the station WMMS in Cleveland observed the changes in a 1975 interview: "I think the '60s are ending about now. Now we are really starting the '70s. The emphasis is shifting back to entertainment instead of being 'relevant.' In fact, I wouldn't call our station progressive radio. That's outdated. I call it radio. But I heard a good word in the trades, AOR. That's Album-Oriented Rock. That's a name for the '70s."

Radio consultants Kent Burkhart and Lee Abrams significantly affected AOR programming. The two consultants created Kent Burkhart/Lee Abrams & Associates, which became one of the most prominent AOR consulting firms during the mid to late 1970s. Abrams' SuperStars format, previously developed at WQDR, was based on extensive research, focused on the most popular artists, such as Fleetwood Mac and the Eagles, and included older material from those artists. While his format was not quite as constricted as Top 40 radio, it was considerably more restricted than freeform or progressive radio. Their firm advised program directors for a substantial segment of AOR stations all over the U.S.

By the late 1970s, AOR radio stations began to focus on a more narrowly defined rock sound. Stations began reducing the number of folk, jazz, and blues artists played and effectively eliminated most black artists from airplay. While AOR had once championed soul, funk, and R&B artists like Stevie Wonder, War, and Sly Stone, the format no longer represented these styles and took a stance against disco. In 1979, Steve Dahl of WLUP in Chicago destroyed disco records on his radio show, culminating in the notorious Disco Demolition Night at Comiskey Park.

The continuity of rock artists and songs carried through each phase links the freeform, progressive, and AOR formats. Programmers and DJs of the freeform and progressive phases continued to cultivate a repertoire of rock music and style of delivery that became the foundations of AOR and classic rock radio. Those AOR stations, which decided to stay demographically rooted, became classic rock stations by eschewing newer bands and styles for which their older listeners might have tuned out.

== Programming ==
Most radio formats are based on a select, tight rotation of hit singles. The best example is Top 40, though other formats, like country, smooth jazz, and urban, all utilize the same basic principles, with the most popular songs repeating every two to six hours, depending on their rank in the rotation. Generally, there is a strict order or list to follow, and the DJ does not decide playlist selections.

While still based on the rotation concept, AOR focused on the album as a whole rather than singles. In the early 1970s, many DJs were free to choose which track(s) to play off a given album and had the latitude to decide the playlist order. Consequently, AOR radio gave mainstream exposure to album tracks that never became hits on the record charts limited to singles; Billboard, for instance, did not establish an airplay chart for album tracks until 1981.

Later in the 1970s, AOR stations shifted song selection to a program director or music director rather than the DJ. Still, when an AOR station added an album to rotation, they often focused on numerous tracks simultaneously rather than playing the singles as they were individually released.

== Criticism ==
In the early 1980s, Black Music Association, a trade association, and other industry observers criticized AOR radio for lacking black artists in their programming. AOR programmers responded that the lack of diversity was the result of increased specialization of radio formats driven by ratings and audience demographics. In 1983, the success of Michael Jackson's album Thriller led to the album's track "Beat It", which featured Eddie Van Halen, being added to the playlists of many AOR stations. At the same time, other black artists also made inroads into AOR radio: Prince ("Little Red Corvette") and Eddy Grant ("Electric Avenue") debuted on Billboard's Top Tracks chart during the same week in April 1983. Through the remainder of the 1980s, Jon Butcher, Tracy Chapman, Living Colour, and Lenny Kravitz also received AOR airplay.

== See also ==
- Album era
