= WMMS =

Rock radio station in Cleveland

- Cleveland, Ohio; United States
- Broadcast area: Greater Cleveland
- Frequency: 100.7 MHz (HD Radio)
- Branding: 100.7 WMMS: The Buzzard

Programming
- Language: English
- Format: Active rock and hot talk
- Subchannels: HD2: Sports radio; HD3: Black Information Network
- Affiliations: Cavaliers AudioVerse; Cleveland Guardians

Ownership
- Owner: iHeartMedia; (iHM Licenses, LLC)
- Sister stations: WAKS; WARF; WGAR-FM; WHLK; WMJI; WTAM

History
- First air date: March 30, 1946
- Former call signs: W8XUB (1946–1947); WHKX (1947–1948); WHK-FM (1948–1968)
- Former frequencies: 107.1 MHz (1946–1947)
- Call sign meaning: "Metromedia Stereo"

Technical information
- Licensing authority: FCC
- Facility ID: 73273
- Class: B
- ERP: 34,000 watts
- HAAT: 183 meters (600 ft)
- Transmitter coordinates: 41°21′30″N 81°40′03″W
- Translators: HD2: 99.1 W256BT (Cleveland); HD3: 101.1 W266CJ (Beachwood)

Links
- Public license information: Public file; LMS
- Webcast: Listen live (via iHeartRadio); Listen live (HD2); Listen live (HD3)
- Website: wmms.iheart.com; sportsradio991cleveland.iheart.com (HD2); cleveland.binnews.com (HD3)

WMMS (100.7 FM, "The Buzzard") is a commercial radio station licensed to Cleveland, Ohio, United States, serving Greater Cleveland and much of Northeast Ohio. Owned by iHeartMedia, WMMS features a mix of active rock and hot talk with Rover's Morning Glory and Alan Cox, is the FM flagship for the Cavaliers AudioVerse and the Cleveland Guardians Radio Network, and also carries The House of Hair with Dee Snider. WMMS's studios are located at the Six Six Eight Building in downtown Cleveland's Gateway District; the transmitter is sited in Seven Hills.

This station has been widely regarded throughout its history as one of the most influential rock outlets in American radio. (Note: The following local and national media outlets have attributed WMMS with this distinction:) (Note: The following books have attributed WMMS with this distinction:) Signing on in 1946 as the FM adjunct to WHK, the first radio station in Ohio, it was also the first commercial FM station in Cleveland. The WMMS call sign was affixed in 1968 under Metromedia ownership ("Metromedia Stereo") and was adopted after the station switched to a progressive rock format. Unlike Metromedia's other entries into FM rock radio, WMMS dropped it the following year due to low ratings and revenue, and went with automated music, but reinstated a rock format by 1970. Metromedia sold WHK and WMMS in 1972 to Malrite Communications, which intended to flip WMMS to a more conservative music format but reversed course after significant community protests. John Gorman was hired in 1973 as program director, a title he held until 1986. Under Gorman's leadership, WMMS had a stable of personalities that remained fundamentally unchanged—in particular morning hosts Jeff Kinzbach and Ed "Flash" Ferenc, afternoon host Kid Leo and evening host Denny Sanders—and attained a dominant market share in local ratings. Debuting in April 1974, WMMS's promotional mascot has been an anthropomorphic "Buzzard" cartoon character, initially as a tongue-in-cheek reference to Cleveland's Rust Belt stigma and later becoming one of the most recognizable symbols in the city.

WMMS played a key role in breaking several major acts in the United States, including David Bowie, Rush, and Bruce Springsteen, the latter's rise attributed heavily to Leo's support. Springsteen's 1978 concert at the Agora Ballroom celebrating WMMS' 10th anniversary was critically acclaimed, regionally syndicated and heavily bootlegged. Station employees went on to take director and executive-level positions in the recording industry, namely with labels RCA, Mercury, and Columbia. Noted filmmakers, including Cameron Crowe (Almost Famous) and Paul Schrader (Light of Day), have called on WMMS personnel for assistance. WMMS was a major driving force behind the successful campaign to bring the Rock and Roll Hall of Fame to Cleveland. The station competed aggressively against WWWM for listeners in the 1970s, and then with WGCL in the 1980s. By 1983, WMMS began playing increasing amounts of contemporary hit radio and adult contemporary songs alongside the standard rock playlist in what was dubbed "rock forty". Facing a deteriorating environment with upper management, Gorman, Sanders and nine other staffers jointly resigned on August 1986 to flip WGCL to WNCX.

Rolling Stone named WMMS its "Best Radio Station" for a large market from 1979 to 1988 as part of their annual Readers' Poll, but the station admitted to stuffing the ballot box following a February 1988 front-page story in The Plain Dealer that drew local and national criticism. Amid subsequent years of management and airstaff turnover, the station's ratings, and those of Kinzbach and Ferenc, began to decline significantly in 1992 following WNCX's addition of The Howard Stern Show. Facing significant debt issues, Malrite sold their radio division to Shamrock Broadcasting, who promptly resold WHK and WMMS to former Malrite executive and WMJI owner Carl Hirsch. Hirsch's April 1994 takeover induced the departure of Kinzbach and Ferenc but returned Gorman to the program director role alongside a relaunch as "Buzzard Radio: The Next Generation", eventually adopting an alternative rock focus. During a June 10, 1994, live remote broadcast of Stern's show intended as a mock "funeral" for the Buzzard, a WMMS engineer severed a transmission line for the show; several staffers pled guilty in court to the federal offense, and WMMS's license faced scrutiny.

Hirsch sold WMMS and WMJI to WGAR-FM owner Nationwide Communications in 1996, resulting in Gorman's second departure. WMMS was refocused to an active rock presentation with shock jock Liz Wilde, who sued the station after being fired over low ratings. Nationwide sold its radio division to Jacor the following year; after the sale closed, WMMS underwent a month-long "retirement" of the Buzzard publicity stunt implying a format switch that was cancelled at the last minute. Clear Channel (now iHeartMedia) bought Jacor in 1999. WMMS became notorious between 1994 and 2008 for an inability to find a successful morning show, a problem that was ultimately resolved with the addition of Rover. The station also began emphasizing talk in the afternoons, first with Maxwell from 2004 to 2009, and with Alan Cox from 2010 onward. Co-flagship of the Cleveland Browns Radio Network from 1991 to 1993 and again from 2001 to 2012, WMMS has been co-flagship of the Guardians since 2012 and the Cavaliers since 2014.

In addition to a standard analog transmission, WMMS broadcasts over three HD Radio channels and is available online via iHeartRadio. WMMS-HD2 is relayed over translator W256BT (99.1 FM) and has a sports format as "Sports Radio 99.1". WMMS-HD3, relayed over translator W266CJ (101.1 FM), is the Cleveland affiliate for the Black Information Network.

== History ==
=== Origins and early years as WHK-FM ===
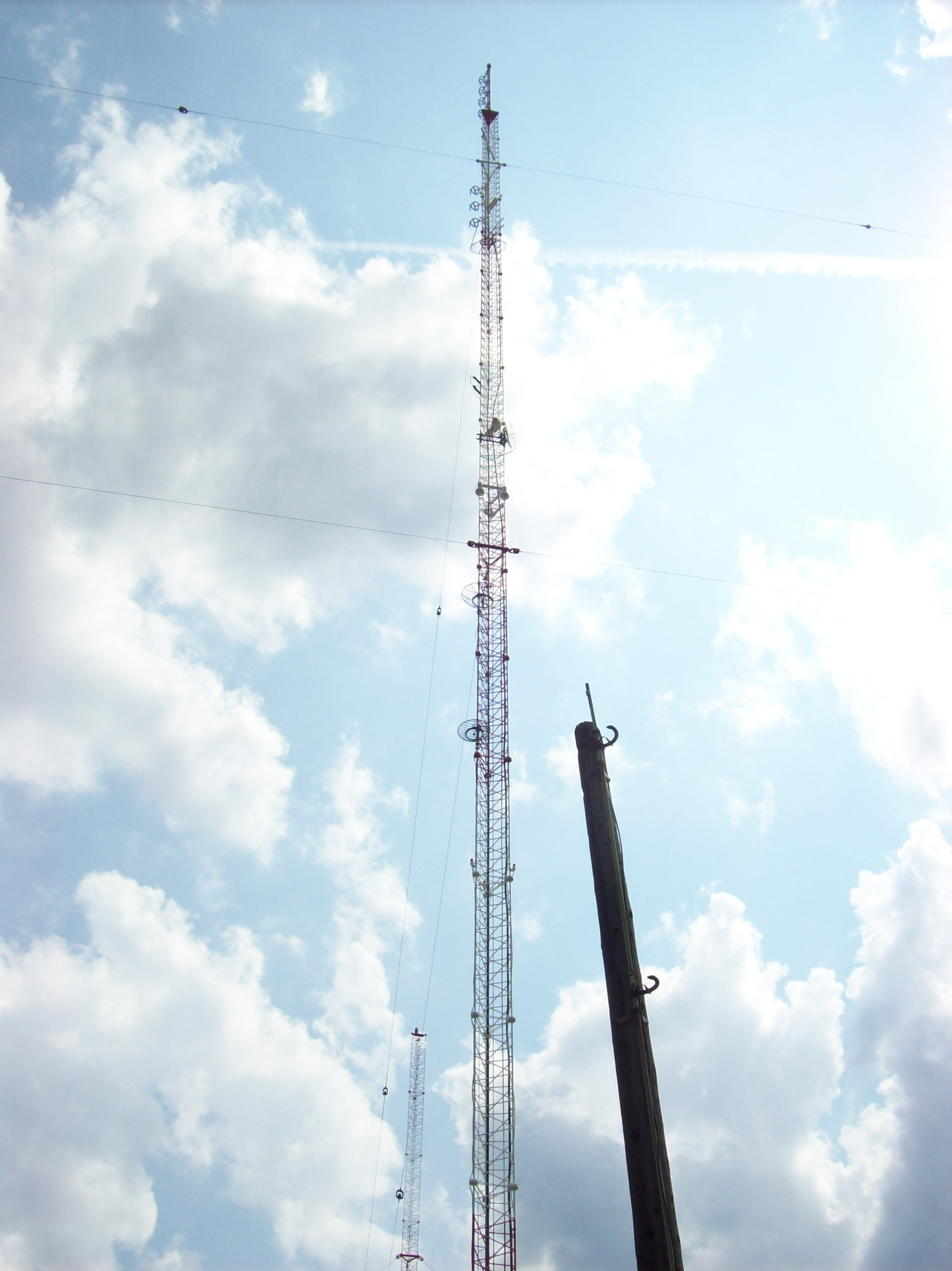
WMMS's transmitter in Seven Hills, part of WHK's tower array

The Agora Theatre and Ballroom, c. 2011, known as the WHK Auditorium from 1951 to 1978

The United Broadcasting Company (UBC), owners of stations WHK and WCLE (Note: WCLE moved to Akron in February 24, 1945, and was renamed WHKK.) and controlled by The Plain Dealer, filed paperwork with the Federal Communications Commission (FCC) in late January 1941 to construct an FM station at 48.5 MHz, with studios at the Higbee Building. At the time, only one FM station was in operation in Cleveland: WBOE, the station of the Cleveland Public Schools. While the FCC dismissed the application without prejudice on June 16, 1942, it was reinstated by the commission on March 30, 1943; by May 1945, UBC filed to move the transmitter to WHK's Seven Hills site.

UBC launched W8XUB, an experimental FM station at 107.1 MHz, on March 30, 1946, with talks delivered by WHK general manager H. K. Carpenter, chief engineer Carl Smith, and Plain Dealer writer Robert S. Stephan. Only two FM receivers were reported as having picked up W8XUB: one at the WHK transmitter site and another in a downtown store. The FCC issued a construction permit for W8XUB on August 11, 1946. W8XUB was moved to 100.7 MHz on July 31, 1947, and transitioned from experimental to commercial status on November 13, 1947, adopting the WHKX call sign and undergoing a power increase. It was one of eleven FM permits to be granted simultaneously by the FCC in Cleveland, Akron and Elyria. While simulcasting much of WHK's programming, WHKX also originated shows independent of WHK with an emphasis on recorded music and short news bulletins and occasionally broadcast live music concerts. By November 1948, WHKX was renamed WHK-FM. (Note: No exact date for the change is recorded in the FCC history cards, but is attributed as November 11, 1948, in the 1961-62 Broadcasting Yearbook. As early as December 1947, The Plain Dealer referred to the station simultaneously as "WHKX" and "WHK-FM".) Both stations moved in February 1951 to the "WHK Auditorium", a complex also intended for television as UBC held a UHF permit for a station on channel 19.

In early January 1954, WHK morning host Bill Gordon solicited on-air for listener interest in a nightly program of high fidelity recordings on WHK-FM, believing hi-fi on FM could help mitigate television's impact on radio. Despite this, WHK-FM continued to simulcast WHK, even as other stations like WDOK-FM, WERE-FM, WGAR-FM and KYW-FM began originating programming of their own. UBC sold WHK and WHK-FM to DuMont Broadcasting, recently spun off from the Allen B. DuMont Laboratories, on February 26, 1958, for $750,000 (equivalent to $8.37 million in 2025). The WHK Auditorium was sold separately and included a lease agreement. After the sale, John Kluge purchased majority control of DuMont after failing to purchase WSRS and WSRS-FM, and the company was renamed Metropolitan Broadcasting. By 1961, Metropolitan was renamed again to Metromedia.

WHK-FM broke from simulcasting WHK to carry the 1960 Democratic and Republican National Conventions in their entirety, and by October 2, 1961, began a separate music schedule from 4 p.m. until midnight daily; the change was tied to WHK-FM's three-year license renewal. Additional programming was added to WHK-FM on March 12, 1962, including David Susskind's interview show and taped music shows hosted by Big Wilson, formerly of KYW. By 1966, WHK-FM broadcast in stereo and increased programming from 6 a.m. to midnight, the latter change followed the FCC's enactment of the FM Non-Duplication Rule. Plans were made to relaunch WHK-FM in September 1967 with an all-female airstaff after Metromedia's WNEW-FM in New York City did a similar experiment. WHK-FM's plans were delayed; Cleveland Press critic Bill Barrett mused, "... must be easier to find nice-looking ladies than it is to find nice-sounding ones". Despite over 200 applicants, the all-female airstaff never debuted, and WHK-FM continued featuring a middle of the road (MOR) format.

=== Becoming WMMS: "The new groove", dropping and restoring rock ===
January 1969 print ad for WMMS's "New Groove" progressive rock format

In July 1968, Metromedia announced WHK-FM would switch to progressive rock on August 15, along with a future call sign change. Metromedia implemented this format at WNEW-FM and KMET in Los Angeles, both of which would contribute to WHK-FM. Concert promoter Pat McCoy, previously WHK's music director, pitched the format to the station and noted the successes at WNEW and KMET; Metromedia agreed to the pitch and hired him as operations manager. While WHK-FM was the first station in Cleveland to adopt progressive rock full-time, it had been represented through Martin Perlich's The Perlich Project on WCLV and Doc Nemo's overnight shows on WZAK and WIXY, the latter the market's dominant Top 40 station. Both Nemo and Perlich joined WHK-FM, Nemo for late nights while Perlich hosted weekends alongside his WCLV work. Billy Bass, a former record store manager who specialized in the genre, hosted evenings.

Dubbed "The New Groove", WHK-FM was renamed WMMS on September 28, 1968, standing for "Metromedia Stereo". Press writer Nelson Moore said of the new format, "It's like sitting down all day with a ten foot stack of albums and letting someone else do all the work of playing them for you while you just sit back and listen". Airstaff initially ran into culture clashes with the older engineers tasked with playing the music, some of which refused to play the music cued up. WMMS hosted a series of concerts at the WHK Auditorium, with one set by The Moody Blues described by Plain Dealer writer Karl Burkhardt as "ear shattering" and "plaster... falling from the ceiling". As 1968 ended, the playlist was altered to include select Top 40 hits and post-1963 songs alongside the rock music in a bid to increase listeners.

Unlike in other markets where Metromedia succeeded with FM progressive rock, WMMS flipped back to automated MOR on May 27, 1969. WHK/WMMS general manager Ken Gaines cited a lack of listener support and told the Plain Dealer, "popular standards are our forte". Former morning host Victor Boc later claimed the format never had a chance among management and sales personnel desirous of an immediate bottom line impact. Billboard criticized the switch as "like throwing away an FM signal... if you can't use it properly, for God's sake give it away to someone who can!" On November 7, 1969, WMMS flipped again to carry the Drake-Chenault Hit Parade '69, preceded with a marathon airing of The History of Rock and Roll. This coincided with Metromedia appointing a separate general manager for WMMS, in line with the rest of the group.

It was the hardest transition in my life. No more hollerin,' no more bubblegum. No tight play list. At first I couldn't believe myself. But now I can really relax and play music.

— Dick "Wilde Childe" Kemp, March 1971

Hit Parade lasted until September 11, 1970, when WMMS switched to a contemporary rock format with live announcers. The change was led by new general manager L. David Moorhead, who previously held the same position at KMET, and followed WGAR-FM's relaunch as WNCR in July with a progressive rock format. This new format was centered around two former WIXY hosts, Lou "King" Kirby and Dick "Wilde Childe" Kemp, but their debuts were negotiated until the last minute with WMMS and WIXY's legal counsel as they were three months into six-month non-compete clauses triggered after leaving WIXY. The Plain Dealer's Jane Scott described WMMS in March 1971 as "relaxed, progressive contemporary rock" with an emphasis on environmentalism and community involvement. Kirby left WMMS by April 1971 and Kemp by January 1972. Fred Imus, brother of WGAR morning host Don Imus, briefly hosted mornings on WMMS in August 1971.

Following Bass' public resignation from WNCR in September 1971, Moorhead hired him as program director, and Perlich and David Spero both left WNCR for WMMS shortly thereafter. Denny Sanders joined WMMS in October as evening host, coming over from WBCN in Boston. Rock club manager and former advertising salesman Len Goldberg joined WMMS in May 1972, despite no previous on-air experience, and became known for a deep, sonorous voice nicknamed "Boom". Sounds retrospectively described WMMS in this period as "totally off-the-wall in its choice of records, playing anything it liked. It is most famous for heavily plugging the MC5, The Velvets and The Dolls on one hand and science-art groups like Soft Machine and King Crimson on the other." An early proponent of music television, Bass oversaw the first radio-TV simulcast of a Glass Harp concert on WMMS and WVIZ, originating from WVIZ's studios.

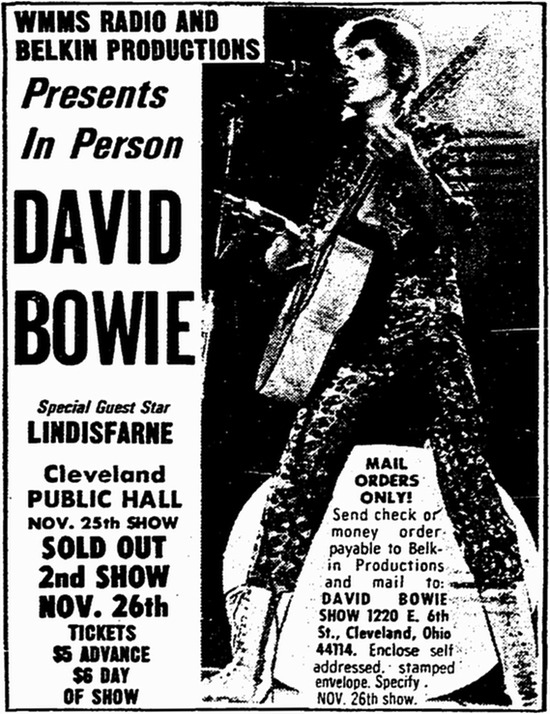
Newspaper ad for David Bowie's November 1972 concerts at Cleveland Public Hall

Under Bass and Sanders, WMMS championed David Bowie on-air, becoming one of the first American radio stations (alongside WBCN) to play the Hunky Dory album. Bass saw Bowie as a needed break from a glut of southern rock like The Allman Brothers Band and Wet Willie, and began extensively playing Bowie's previous albums, which were to that point commercial failures. WMMS sponsored Bowie's first U.S. concert at the 3,200-seat Cleveland Music Hall on September 22, 1972, kicking off the U.S. portion of the Ziggy Stardust Tour, with Bowie in his Ziggy Stardust persona alongside The Spiders from Mars. Following this concert, Bowie's albums experienced a substantial uptick in sales, with some Cleveland record stores unable to keep them in stock. Bass and Belkin Productions arranged a second Bowie concert on November 25, 1972, at the 10,000-seat Cleveland Public Hall; tickets sold out immediately, prompting a third concert to be booked the following night.

=== Malrite takeover and a community protest to keep progressive rock ===
On November 23, 1971, the Plain Dealer and Press reported Malrite Broadcasting was in talks to purchase both WHK and WMMS for $3.5 million (equivalent to $27.8 million in 2025). The sale was announced one week later and followed Malrite's failed bid to buy WKYC and WKYC-FM, which owner NBC rejected for being too low. Malrite chairman Milton Maltz previously applied for a job at WHK in 1958 while awaiting approval with associate Robert G. Wright to build WTTF in Tiffin. Maltz said of both stations, "the existing personnel are of outstanding quality and we are looking forward to picking up where Metromedia will be leaving off and provide an outstanding broadcasting service to Cleveland". Maltz planned to launch a community survey to determine future plans for WHK and WMMS, although he considered WHK to be "in good health". Bass later told Radio & Records that he, Perlich and Spero were unaware of the sale at the time when Moorhead hired them. Metromedia transferred Moorhead back to KMET by April 1973 and Bass was named as general manager; Perlich also left for KMET the following month and Sanders became program director.

Paperwork filed with the FCC on January 24, 1972, revealed Malrite planned to switch WMMS to a more conservative-style contemporary format similar to WHK, and applied to change WMMS's call sign to WHEZ. The uncertainty over the station led community activist Henry Speeth to create "The Committee to Retain the Community Service Format of WMMS", (Note: Speeth also called the organization, "The Committee to Deny the Transfer of WHK and WMMS to Malrite Media".) which filed a petition to deny for both stations on April 3, 1972. The Committee gathered over 900 signatures by March; by July, the number grew to 900 signatures in what the FCC called a "significant" response. Ultimately, 80 different letters and 7,100 signatures were gathered in support of the progressive rock format. At a mediation session between the Committee and Malrite executives, Speeth proposed to Maltz that WMMS could maintain the format for a year and only switch if the station could not turn a profit, which Maltz agreed to.

"The Mushroom": WMMS's logo used after the purchase by Malrite, designed by Judy Tiburski

On September 11, 1972, Malrite asked to rescind the WHEZ call request; three days later, Maltz told the Plain Dealer WMMS would not be changed. The Committee withdrew their petition, and the FCC approved the sale on October 31. After the deal closed on December 4, Hal Fisher was named vice president of both stations. Bass, public relations director Joyce Halasa and operations manager Patricia Nealis jointly resigned on December 28, 1972. Their departures were followed two days later by Jeff Gelb, who had left WNCR two weeks earlier to join WMMS; Gelb rejoined WNCR shortly thereafter. All the resignations were policy-related. Bass resigned despite getting a raise, claiming Malrite "took away our engineers and my salesman" and criticized a combined advertising rate now in place for both stations. Halasa noted the station was beginning to cut corners "in other ways" despite staff raises. Both Bass and Halasa lobbied for other staff to resign rather than conform to the new ownership. Sanders assured the format would be unchanged, while Bass joined RCA Records as a regional R&B promotion manager.

Facing burnout by July 1973, Sanders urged Malrite to hire John Gorman as music director. Gorman and Sanders became close friends in Boston in 1970 working at WNTN, a small daytime-only AM station that briefly featured a progressive rock format. By September, Gorman was promoted to program director, allowing Sanders to focus on his on-air shift, a move Sanders willingly took. WMMS's ratings doubled in the Fall 1973 Arbitron book, while WHK, which installed an all-cover song format, dropped significantly. On April 7, 1974, Malrite flipped WHK to country, competing against WNCR, which flipped to country weeks earlier.

=== Evolving from "Find Me" ===
The departures of Bass, Perlich, Halasa and Gelb left WMMS short-staffed, prompting Sanders to recruit from "WCSU", a carrier current station at Cleveland State University (CSU) limited to the PA system in Stillwell Hall's cafeteria. Lawrence Travagliante was hired first and referred Matthew Lapczynski to Sanders. An engineering and business student at CSU, Travagliante learned involvement at WCSU did not require a communications major. A "fervent fan" of WMMS, Travagliante sent audition tapes to the station multiple times before being hired in February 1973, shortly before he was to graduate; he and Lapczynski also pitched running progressive rock in the evenings on WLYT. Travagliante nicknamed himself "Kid Leo" after British disc jockey Kid Jensen and because it made him sound like a boxer. Lapczynski joined the following month and worked nearly every daypart in his first month; after Gorman's arrival, Lapczynski was nicknamed "Matt the Cat".

Ed Ferenc was also hired from WCSU to join WHK's news staff for $2 an hour, and quickly began editing "rip-and-read" wire stories for WMMS's air talent. Ferenc was nicknamed "Flash" by Debbie Ullman after she became morning host and preferred he present the newscasts. Betty Korvan, a CSU philosophy student who did news on WCSU, was hired in May 1974 on referral from Ferenc: her first day on-air, filling in for Leo, included an in-studio interview with Paul Kantner and Marty Balin from Jefferson Starship. Larry Bole, another WCSU alum, joined in November 1974 for part-time work and WCSU and CSU were now recognized as a "farm team" for WMMS. When Spero left in March 1974 to manage Michael Stanley, Matt the Cat replaced him in afternoon drive; by May, Matt moved to middays replacing Goldberg (who moved to weekends) and Leo hosted afternoons. Jeff Kinzbach joined WMMS in March 1973 as production director, but his career began in 1969 as a teenage gofer at WIXY, and briefly worked at a Saginaw, Michigan, station.

Donna Halper, 2006

Ullman, along with Donna Halper, were recruited from Boston in late October 1973: Ullman took Sanders' morning slot, allowing him to move to evenings, and Halper took over as music director with a weekend shift. Ullman was at the time one of a few female announcers in Cleveland radio, and the only one in morning drive, but her WMMS career ended abruptly in January 1975 after a head-on collision that required her jaw to be wired shut. Halper is now widely recognized for discovering Rush and introducing the Canadian band to the U.S., and for being the first disc jockey to play "Working Man". (Note: The following sources credit Halper with this distinction:) Presented the record by promoter Bob Roper, Halper immediately saw the song as "a Cleveland record" playing up to the city's working class and blue-collar status. Geddy Lee's vocal similarities to Led Zeppelin's Jimmy Page were played up by Halper and Sanders, further driving interest at record stores; Roper told Halper to contact Rush's management team directly about the new demand. Rush played alongside ZZ Top at the Allen Theatre on June 28, 1974, and with Halper's assistance, signed with Mercury Records as Cliff Burnstein "really understood the band". Halper and WMMS were thanked in the liner notes of the re-issue of Rush on the Mercury label.

The station continued to suffer from engineering neglect, a pattern that began with Metromedia. WMMS's studios and record library were inadequate in size, the air conditioning system occasionally broke down, and the air signal suffered from sibilance. When Gorman floated an idea to chief engineer Tom Bracnovich of WMMS switching studios with WHK, Bracnovich laughed and said, "you know what FM stands for? Find Me!" A September 1974 phone interview Sanders conducted with John Lennon only took place after the engineering department located a tube Magnacord tape recorder, with patch cords between studios held up by alligator clips, rubber bands and tape. It is considered by Gorman to be the best interview in the station's history.

=== The Coffee Break Concerts ===
WMMS aired a weekly music-interview series dubbed the Coffee Break Concerts that debuted on March 22, 1972; Billy Bass conceived the program after Carol Hall's label, Elektra Records, offered a live concert to promote her Beads and Feathers album. Initially presented at the WMMS studios, by 1979, it was moved to Bobby McGee's in Playhouse Square and again to the Agora Ballroom, the latter allowing for a live in-studio audience. Performers included Warren Zevon, John Mellencamp, John Bassette, Alex Bevan, Lou Reed, Tim Buckley and Peter Frampton, among others. Marc Cohn's first performance occurred on a Coffee Break Concert in 1977, days after his 18th birthday. Gorman learned years later that MTV Unplugged was largely inspired by the Coffee Break Concerts from an MTV staffer who had ties to Cleveland. The program had a rotation of hosts before Matt the Cat was named permanent host in 1975, and Sanders handled the booking of all acts.

The series was put on hiatus after the Agora Ballroom suffered heavy fire damage on October 24, 1984. While it resumed the following February at Peabody's DownUnder, the series had become overshadowed by a multitude of WMMS-hosted free concerts. Coffee Break Concerts aired on an intermittent basis through the 1980s, was put on hiatus again in 1994, revived in 1997 with Metallica as the first guest performer and ran through the early 2000s.

=== The WMMS Buzzard ===
The origins of the WMMS Buzzard had nothing to do with Buzzard Day, the annual "folksy event" held in Hinckley Township that Gorman was unaware of until 1975. In mid-1973, WMMS adopted a logo featuring an imp toking underneath a mushroom; the logo was designed by Judy Tiburski, sister of WMMS sales manager Walt Tiburski. While the logo was at that point sufficient as the station had no marketing budget, it felt dated to Gorman because the mushroom was static and could not be animated. The mushroom logo also led listeners to derive alternate slogans for WMMS, including "Weed Makes Me Smile" and "Magic Mushrooms". Gorman and Sanders debated the station having a mascot-type logo, inspired both by sports teams and Shawmut Bank's distinctive logo with Chief Obbatinewat, at the time the most recognizable in Boston.

One evening, Gorman listened to Sanders play "Desolation Row" while driving back to his East Cleveland home, and connected the winged-creature's classification as a scavenger to people's perceptions of Cleveland as a dying city. Gorman loosely sketched out a buzzard on top of a "WIXY" gravestone in a mushroom-populated cemetery (a second sketch had the buzzard sitting on a mushroom with Arbitron diaries in his mouth). Gorman and Sanders recruited David Helton, an American Greetings artist, to draw the advertisement. A native of Chattanooga, Tennessee, Helton became a fan of WMMS after moving to Cleveland, and mailed to the station a comic protesting The National Lampoon Radio Hour being shortened from an hour-long show to 30 minutes, which National Lampoon jokingly blamed on the affiliates. It took Gorman and Sanders considerable investigative efforts to locate Helton, who signed the comic "Dave" with a "W. Blvd." return address.

The "Wrath of the Buzzard" ad drawn by Helton, and the WMMS Buzzard, debuted on April 15, 1974, in Zeppelin, a local alternative biweekly. Helton was paid in concert tickets, albums and $20 out-of-pocket from Gorman. As Malrite was recalcitrant on the Buzzard becoming WMMS's logo, Gorman, Sanders and Helton turned to guerrilla marketing through t-shirts, bumper stickers and a large mural on the side of the Music Grotto, a record store near the Cleveland State University campus. Within weeks, the sales department, along with national program director John Chafee and general manager Carl Hirsch, warmed up to the logo change. Gorman later said, "we [myself, Sanders and Helton] joked about the Buzzard becoming Cleveland's Mickey Mouse... a "Buzzard Land" amusement park filled with sex, drugs and rock and roll." The Buzzard was never depicted by someone in a costume; promotions director Dan Garfinkel argued, "David's such a great artist that it would be very difficult to create a costume and then find a person who could fulfill the imaginary character who's been established", while Gorman felt the personalities should represent the station, allowing the Buzzard to have a level of "theatre of the mind" mystique.

Evolution of the WMMS Buzzard, 1975–1979

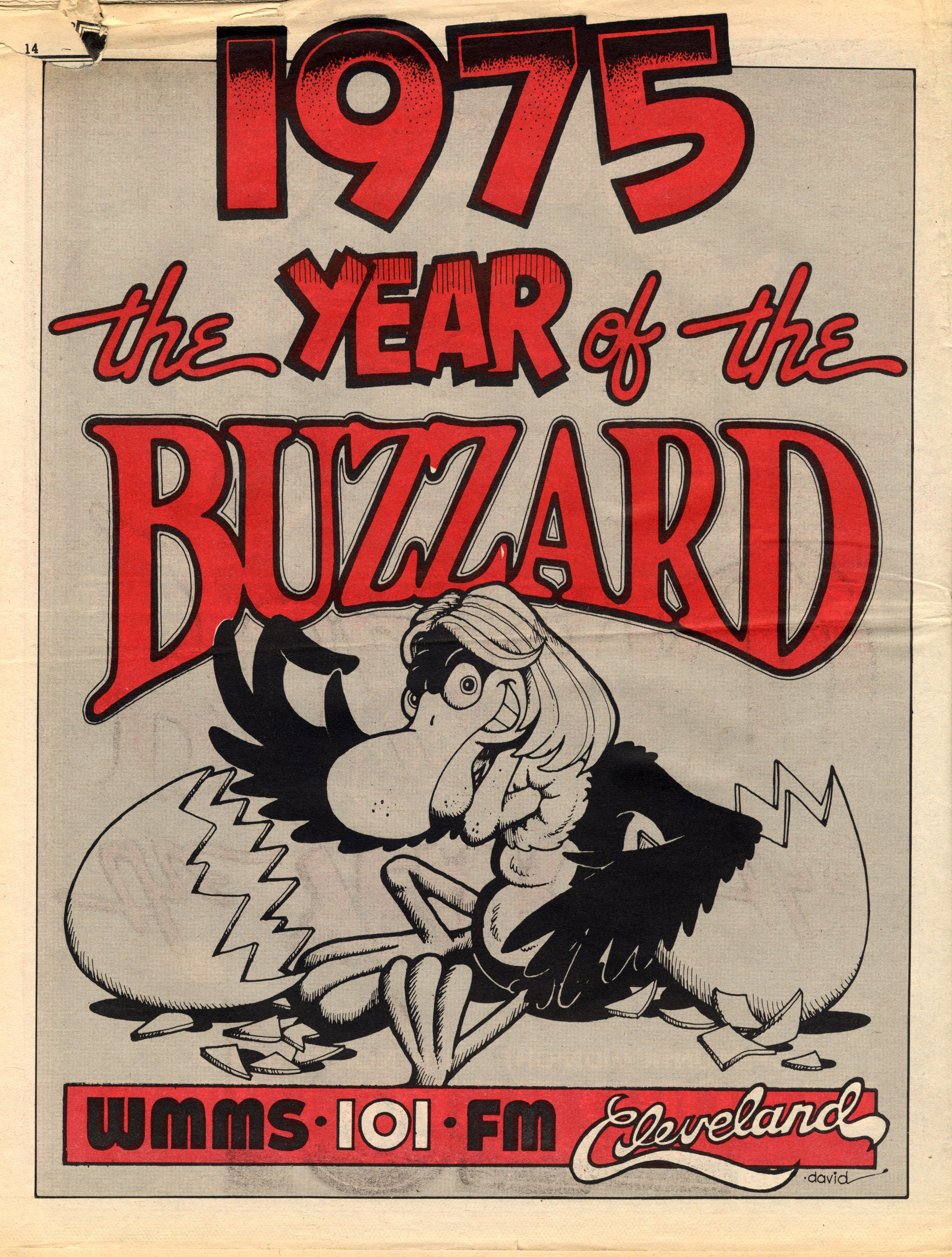
January 9, 1975

March 10, 1975

January 7, 1977

April 22, 1977

January 27, 1978

October 13, 1978

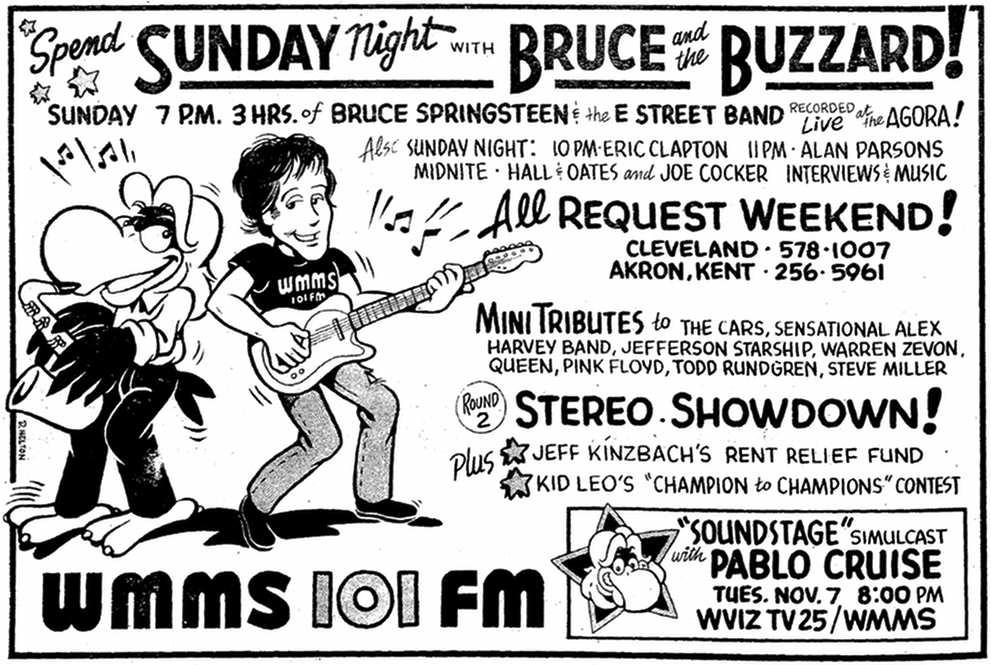
November 3, 1978

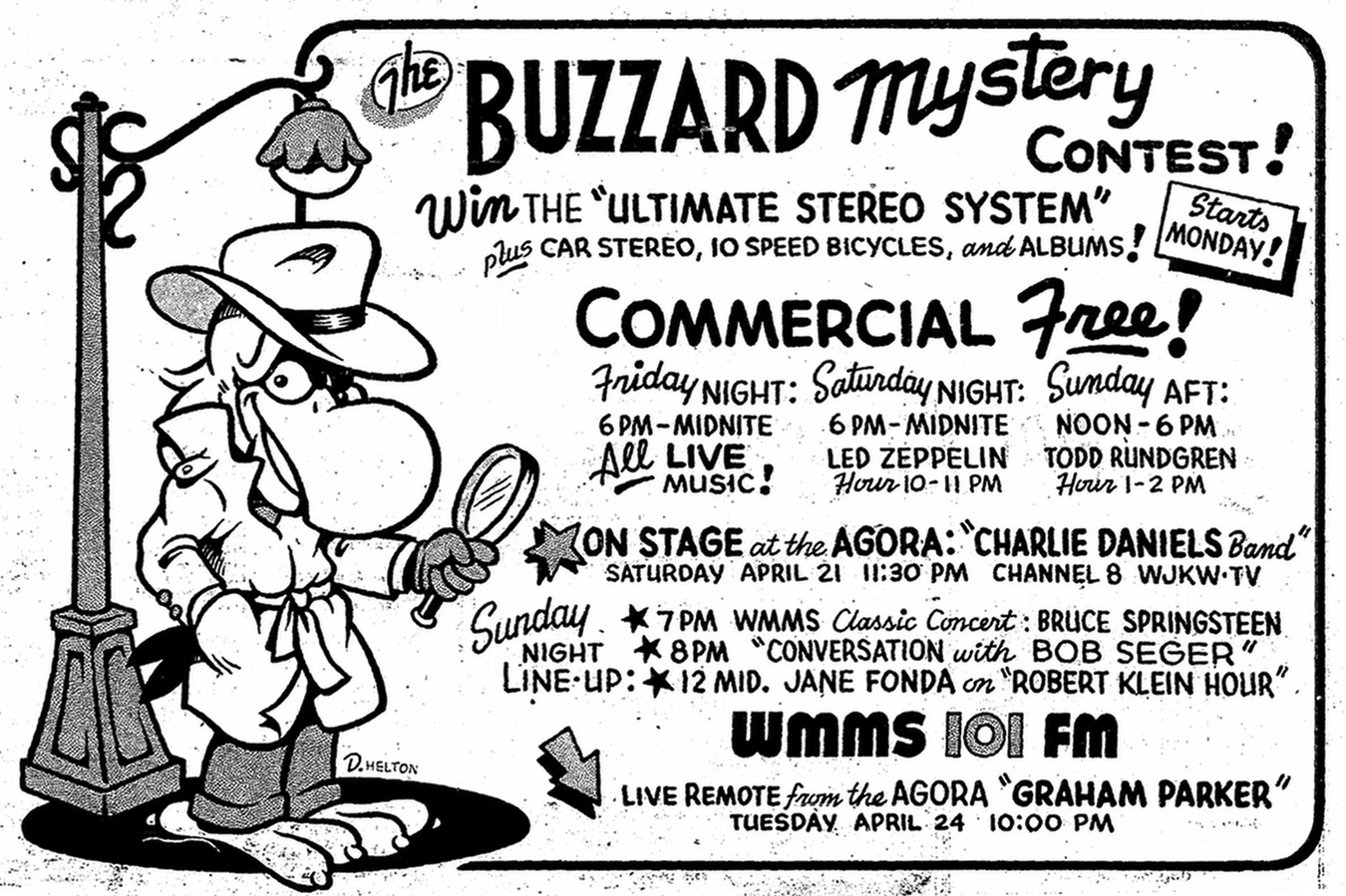
April 20, 1979

April 27, 1979

According to Garfinkel, a 1975 study conducted by MBA students at Case Western Reserve University found the WMMS Buzzard was more recognizable to those living in Greater Cleveland than both Chief Wahoo of the Cleveland Indians and even Coca-Cola. By 1978, the WMMS Buzzard was seen and utilized in all types of paraphernalia, appearing on and in billboards, newspaper advertisements, t-shirts, buses, movie theater trailers, belt buckles, lighters and a Malley's candy bar. Helton left American Greetings in 1976 to work full-time for WMMS's in-house creative team, and drew a "cartoon to the editor" replying to former colleague Tom Wilson, who name-dropped WMMS in a Ziggy comic. In 1981, Radio & Records named "the malevolent feathered figure" as "the best-known station symbol in the country." Helton remained the primary artist for the Buzzard and for other Malrite stations until 1990, when assistant Brian Chalmers took over.

=== World Series of Rock ===
The World Series of Rock was a recurring, day-long and usually multi-act summer rock concert held outdoors at Cleveland Municipal Stadium from 1974 through 1980. Staged by Belkin Productions and sponsored by WMMS, the concerts attracted popular hard rock bands and boasted as many as 88,000 fans; attendance was by general admission. Concertgoers occasionally fell, or jumped, off the steep stadium upper deck onto the concrete seating area far below, causing serious injury. The Cleveland Free clinic staffed aid stations in the stadium with physicians, nurses and other volunteers, and through 1977, made its treatment statistics public. From 1978 on, Belkin Productions conditioned its funding of the Free Clinic on the nondisclosure of the number of Clinic staff on duty at the concerts, the nature of conditions treated and the number of patients treated.

=== "Born to Run": Bruce Springsteen, Kid Leo and the 1978 Agora concert ===
"Born to Run" was the essence of everything I loved about rock 'n' roll. Bruce held on to the innocence and the romance. At the same time, the music communicates frustration and a constant longing to escape.

— Kid Leo

Kid Leo is frequently credited with helping boost Bruce Springsteen's career outside of New Jersey and the Delaware Valley to the point where Leo, Springsteen and WMMS are intertwined. (Note: As attributed by the following books and sources:) Leo was introduced to Springsteen through Spero, who was introduced through Michael Stanley; Spero, Sanders and Matt the Cat played tracks from his first two albums (Greetings from Asbury Park, N.J. and The Wild, the Innocent & the E Street Shuffle) but on a sporadic basis. Leo focused more on glam rock acts and was dismissive of Springsteen being called "the new Dylan", but was impressed with a demo track of "Born to Run", in particular the "Wall of Sound" effect. Presented the demo in November 1974, Leo began playing the song frequently, including every Friday night at 5:55 p.m. By Thanksgiving, it enjoyed heavy airplay and caused Springsteen's label, Columbia Records, to rush release of the single.

WMMS co-sponsored a Springsteen concert at John Carroll University on February 18, 1975, which Leo called, "extraordinary... the most important thing America has to offer right now". Tim Russert, then the president of John Carroll's University Club, booked the event for $2,500 and remained a Springsteen fan for the rest of his life. WMMS began playing tracks from Springsteen's prior albums, augmented with live concert material supplied by WMMR's Ed Sciaky, one of Springsteen's earliest boosters; creating sales increases. Gorman later said, "I had to hand it to Columbia. If their plan was to establish Springsteen's first two albums only months before his third, it worked." When Springsteen played to a sell-out crowd at the Akron Civic Theatre in August 1975, the Born to Run album had heavy advance orders. Leo hailed him as "the best actor since James Dean... he feels stories and he tells stories. I hope he lasts".

As part of Springsteen's Darkness Tour for his Darkness on the Edge of Town album, a series of free live concerts were arranged to be carried on ad hoc networks. Steve Popovich, then a Columbia executive, insisted WMMS originate one of the concerts and pitched having it at the Agora. Gorman also cited Leo's friendship with Springsteen as a factor and Springsteen credited Cleveland for supporting him from the start. Taking place on August 9, 1978, the concert served as a tie-in for WMMS's "10th anniversary". Tickets were selected at random from self-addressed stamped envelopes; 375 envelopes were drawn in a lottery. Over three million people in seven cities heard the concert, which lasted for over three hours and multiple encores. Springsteen's manager Jon Landau and audio engineer Jimmy Iovine supervised the broadcast, accounting for its high audio quality; because of this, the concert was heavily bootlegged and not given an official release until 2014 with The Agora, Cleveland 1978.

Journalist Eric Weisbard has regarded the concert as "the classic WMMS moment" which secured Springsteen's role in rock radio. Gorman saw the concert as a sole bright spot for Cleveland in 1978, which was plagued by political turmoil, high crime and an impending default. (Note: See History of Cleveland § Turbulent era, 1962–1979.) Tony Tilford, who programmed WMMS from 1999 to 2003, later said, "There were other really good rock stations around, but those other stations opted in to carry the live broadcast of the 'MMS birthday show. That's how big 'MMS was. Other stations carried their birthday show. Cincinnati, Pittsburgh, Detroit, St. Louis... they ran another station's birthday party."

=== An AOR powerhouse ===
During this time, with Denny Sanders as Gorman's creative services director and Rhonda Kiefer as programming assistant, WMMS broke all Cleveland ratings and revenue records. WMMS was the first radio station to employ full-time promotion and marketing directors: Dan Garfinkel and his successor, Jim Marchyshyn.

In time, the station adopted new slogans reflecting the callsign: "We're your Modern Music Station" and "your Music Marathon Station."

WMMS during this period would play a key role in breaking several major acts in the US, including: Rush, Roxy Music, Bruce Springsteen, Southside Johnny, Fleetwood Mac, Meat Loaf, The Pretenders, the New York Dolls, Lou Reed, Mott the Hoople, Boston, and The Sensational Alex Harvey Band. A major contributor to the ratings success was an airstaff—Jeff and Flash, Matt the Cat, Leo, Sanders, Korvan and BLF Bash (Bill Freeman)—that remained fundamentally unchanged between 1976 and 1983.

Leo was chosen for Rolling Stone's "Heavy Hundred: The High and Mighty of the Music Industry" (1980) and named "The Best Disc Jockey in the Country" in a special 1987 issue of Playboy.

=== "Rock forty" and the Rock Hall ===
1984 advertisement for Jeff and Flash, now featuring an ensemble cast and soon renamed the Buzzard Morning Zoo

In June 1983, Malrite purchased WVNJ-FM in Newark, New Jersey, for $8.5 million (Note: The deal was arranged as a three-party exchange where Malrite sold WCTI-TV to Heritage Media for $9 million, then purchased WVNJ-FM at the same time.) after Hirsch, by then company president, learned WVNJ's transmitter could be moved to the Empire State Building. Renamed "Z-100" with a contemporary hit radio (CHR) format, WHTZ went from last place to first in New York City ratings within the first 74 days. WMMS's "serving the universe" slogan was appropriated for WHTZ, Helton designed the station logo and Goldberg was used for station identifications. Kinzbach and WHTZ morning host Scott Shannon were friends prior to WHTZ's launch, and Jeff and Flash served as a partial inspiration for Shannon's Z-100 Morning Zoo, while Jeff and Flash was renamed to the Buzzard Morning Zoo. Kinzbach and Shannon exchanged show ideas between each other, but Gorman and Kinzbach denied Shannon's show was copied over to Jeff and Flash, which already had sidekicks "Spaceman Scott" Hughes, "Captain" Kenny Clean and sportscaster Casey Coleman. Ratings for the Buzzard Morning Zoo further increased after John Lanigan left WGAR for a Tampa station in January 1984. Clean left the station in early 1986 and was replaced by John Rio—already a sidekick on Shannon's show—with his "Mr. Leonard" character.

We didn't throw the dinosaur bands off the air. We just expanded our attitude, and while we heard some chatter on the streets, the ratings showed no real deterioration... You're still going to run into people who think we should have kept doing Foreigner, Journey and Moody Blues block parties. Ridiculous! We couldn't have possibly done that!

— Denny Sanders, on WMMS adding pop music artists in 1983

WMMS also began a substantial change in musical focus. While the station already added new wave artists like Eurythmics, Culture Club and Cyndi Lauper, pop artists like Michael Jackson, Prince and Madonna started to be inserted. Gorman announced the change in a memo to Leo that said "we are playing Black music". While this was said to be influenced by WHTZ, the staff meeting agreeing to it occurred in March 1983, and "Beat It" debuted on WMMS the following month. The change was gradual so as to not alienate existing listeners while welcoming older listeners and females, and other pop acts like Wham! and The Pointer Sisters soon found airplay. The station was defined in Radio & Records as "formatless". Gorman argued to Billboard that AOR was now too complacent and structured, stripped of the "broad-based, no-holds barred format" it had been. By April 1985, WMMS reported to industry trades as CHR, a move meant more as a statement against the record industry's biases towards AOR stations, but Gorman defined the format internally as a hybrid of AOR, CHR and adult contemporary. Uncommon for most CHR stations, WMMS maintained a regular playlist of 60 songs per week and, while now utilizing reverb, did not use on-air jingles. Staff called the format "rock forty", and a Saturday night classic rock program was also launched.

Both Gorman and Sanders defended the changes as necessary in order to maintain WMMS's ratings and reputation as a leader in new music, owing to the overall decline in AOR and rise in classic rock. Heightened competition also played a role: WRQC switched from modern rock to CHR in December 1983, a decision largely influenced by WHTZ, while WGCL revamped their morning show to The G Team, drawing criticism from Gorman, who considered it "a blatant ripoff" of WMMS and WHTZ. WGCL emerged as a main competitor for WMMS, and drew industry notice when it ranked number one in the Summer 1983 Arbitron book, unseating WMMS. The broad-based format WMMS had was in part a hindrance as they accepted beer advertising, who did not want to encourage teen drinking. WMMS took their rivalry with WGCL into a public one, referring to it as "the baboon station" and their air staff as "baboons", and targeted Beau Coup and Slade, who associated with WGCL. Ultimately, WGCL's first place finish was never replicated; along with programming instability and ownership allocating more money toward sister WERE, later management argued "G-98" faltered after trying to imitate WMMS too much.

In May 1985, former Cleveland ad agency executive Edgar S. Spizel approached Gorman, Leo, Sanders and WMMS general manager Bill Smith if the station could lobby for a museum devoted to rock music after he learned Bill Graham wanted to establish one in San Francisco. The concept of such a museum was not new: in 1981, Agora Ballroom owner/founder Hank LoConti led a prior effort for a venue in Cleveland that failed due to a lack of money. After Gorman contacted Tunc Erim, assistant to Atlantic Records president Ahmet Ertegun, he learned the Rock and Roll Hall of Fame (RRHOF) had already been established as a nonprofit organization in early 1984, and Ertegun secured a building in Manhattan to house it, boosted by a tax break from New York City mayor Ed Koch. Norm N. Nite, a former WGAR host and rock historian, suggested that Cleveland be the host city instead, and a presentation was led primarily by Hirsch and Cleveland mayor George Voinovich to the RRHOF board.

Results of the USA Today telephone poll for Rock and Roll Hall of Fame finalist host cities, taken January 20–21, 1986
City	Total phone calls
Cleveland	110,315
Memphis	7,268
San Francisco	4,006
Nashville	2,886
New Orleans	2,500
New York City	2,159
Philadelphia	1,044
Chicago	1,030

After the RRHOF was formally announced with plans to have a physical museum, WMMS began and oversaw a petition drive in collaboration with other stations and civic groups, and collected over 660,000 signatures. The attention created by Cleveland's lobbying led Chicago, Memphis, Nashville, New Orleans, Philadelphia and San Francisco to set up their own RRHOF campaigns: on January 20, 1986, USA Today launched a telephone poll to gauge support for the cities, with each city assigned a 900 number. Kinzbach and Ferenc, along with multiple area radio and television stations, heavily promoted the phone number for Cleveland. WMMS set up a phone bank at the Statler so people could call the number free of charge. The poll response was so lopsided in Cleveland's favor that USA Today extended it for fifteen hours; Leo told the paper, "the hall of fame has united the grandmothers and the grandchildren of this city". By the time the poll ended, Cleveland had fifteen times as many responses as second-place Memphis.

WMMS staged a "Moondog Coronation Ball II" headlined by Chuck Berry on March 21, 1986, commemorating the 34th anniversary of the Moondog Coronation Ball, widely regarded as the first rock concert. (Note: WMMS later sponsored a "Moondog III" concert on March 21, 1987.) Eric Carmen recorded "The Rock Stops Here" as a promotional single with profits going to the Cleveland Growth Association's RRHOF fund, and enjoyed heavy WMMS airplay. Led largely by WMMS's petition drive and the phone poll results, the RRHOF agreed on May 1, 1986, to be located in Cleveland. Ohio governor Dick Celeste—who was part of the RRHOF press conference alongside Ertegun, Voinovich and congresswoman Mary Rose Oakar—sat in as a Buzzard Morning Zoo guest co-host on May 23, 1986, alongside Kinzbach and Ferenc.

=== Losing Gorman and Sanders and the Rolling Stone Readers' Poll scandal ===
On August 15, 1986, Gorman and Sanders jointly resigned; Gorman told the Plain Dealer "I didn't have the same passion anymore" at WMMS and sought to build up his radio consultancy business, which his Malrite duties prevented. Gorman later asserted morale deteriorated following the departure of Hirsch, who had a falling out with Maltz after WMMS lost money sponsoring the Victory Tour locally; Hirsch's successor, Gil Rosenwald, led what became a "toxic" work environment. After Gorman and Sanders learned WGCL's new ownership, Metropolis Broadcasting, planned to make them an offer to switch stations, coupled with rumors Malrite was putting WHK and WMMS for sale, both opted to leave. Gorman and Sanders, along with nine other former WHK-WMMS staffers, joined Metropolis and by October flipped WGCL to WNCX, with a broad-based rock format designated as CHR.

Gorman was replaced with Brian Philips, formerly of WSSX-FM in Charleston, South Carolina. Under Philips, WMMS further leaned into CHR, playing Michael Jackson's "Bad" and George Michael's "I Want Your Sex", along with the Beastie Boys. WMMS continued to enjoy high ratings, posting a 15.7 overall share and a 20.4 share in morning drive in the Winter 1986 Arbitron book; the Winter 1987 book had WMMS with a 12.5 overall share and a 17.3 share in mornings. Marketing tie-ins extended to "Buzzard Morning Zoo Corn Flakes" (re-packaged generic brand corn flakes) sold by Finast and Pick-N-Pay and a "WMMS Mastercard" credit card with Ameritrust. Plain Dealer columnist Michael Heaton criticized the station for focusing its creativity solely onto marketing, saying, "WMMS has proven how important promotion can be to a radio station. But the music got lost in the razzle dazzle. They're selling sizzle, not steak." Philips left WMMS after one year, citing both the cold weather and the desire of "creating a legendary station, not just maintaining one". His replacement was Jeff McCartney, who came over from KSD-FM in St. Louis.

I was in the middle of this damned thing, and I should have just said, 'Screw all you idiots! This is the way we're going to handle it', and gone on the air and told what really happened. They tried to put a spin on it. The station had already been playing Michael Jackson and Madonna, and now this!

— Jeff Kinzbach, on WMMS's damage control efforts after the 1988 Rolling Stone "Station of the Year" ballot-stuffing scandal

The March 10, 1988, issue of Rolling Stone awarded WMMS "Radio Station of the Year" for the tenth straight year, narrowly beating WNEW-FM. Two days after the issue hit newsstands, on February 25, 1988, the Plain Dealer revealed station employees stuffed the ballot box, with an internal memo calling for the purchase of 800 copies of the magazine to be distributed amongst employees, family and friends. The memo was leaked to the Plain Dealer by Walt Tiburski, at that point owner of WQAL. Said 800 votes comprised the majority of the 1,000 votes WMMS received in the poll. According to Gorman, Rosenwald oversaw the ballot stuffing under concern the station's ratings were beginning to decline, and thus would risk commanding lower ad rates. General manager Lonnie Gronek verified the memo and said it was a practice WMMS had done "for years" and that "if we didn't buy the copies, some other city would".

Rosenwald and Gronek directed WMMS to suspend regular programming the morning the Plain Dealer story broke. Gronek appeared as a guest on the Morning Zoo defending the station as only being guilty of overzealousness on Cleveland's behalf, a move Kinzbach later regretted. The next day, WMMS took out a full-page newspaper ad, saying "WMMS has always urged its own employees to participate in the balloting—all at the station's expense" and "Jealous competitors often take desperate steps to 'knock off #1.' WMMS will not be intimidated." WNEW-FM program director Mark Chernoff insisted that Rolling Stone present the award to WNEW instead. Rolling Stone removed the award from all future polls, mostly because of Gronek's remarks, which editor Jim Henke said "certainly goes against the spirit of the Reader's Poll". By November, the magazine reversed course and reinstated the award, while WMMS declined to participate.

Plain Dealer editor Brett Larkin said WMMS's eagerness to earn the city national exposure backfired with the station now a subject of mockery nationwide. Heaton, one of the Plain Dealer reporters to break the ballot-stuffing story, lamented in his column over how WMMS had lost its rock roots and now "buys the right to be called 'the best radio station' in the nation." Bob Dyer of the Akron Beacon Journal compared the station's response to that of Spiro Agnew. Two staffers in the promotions department—including Maureen Duffy, who wrote the memo—were ultimately fired several weeks later, but the station denied the dismissals had to do with what Plain Dealer writer David Sowd called "Buzzardgate". The City Club of Cleveland satirized the scandal in their annual "Anvil Revue" broadcast over WCLV, upsetting Maltz. Gronek was transferred to a sales position in Malrite by September. Gorman later called the incident the moment "when WMMS was 'over'", ending the station's golden age.

=== Kid Leo departs, on-air turnover and changing times ===
Kid Leo, c. 1980

The Spring 1988 Arbitron book showed WMMS still at number one overall, but declining to a 10 share; while leading in mornings and afternoons, WMMS finished at fourth place in middays and third place in evenings. The decline in middays resulted in Matt the Cat and evening host Renzy swapping airshifts by that August. Kid Leo left the station on December 16, 1988, for a role at Columbia Records, his final show included call-ins from Springsteen, Huey Lewis, John Cougar Mellencamp and Cyndi Lauper, and ended with Springsteen's "Born to Run". Leo was replaced by Ruby Cheeks, who had replaced Sanders in evenings; Cheeks left in mid-September and was replaced by Lisa Dillon, who, like Cheeks, was previously a Morning Zoo sidekick. Cheeks joined WAAF in Worcester, Massachusetts, a station Gorman had as a client. Turnover extended to upper management: Rosenwald was promoted to Malrite president and COO by December and was succeeded by Dean Thacker; Thacker left the company by November 1989 and Rosenwald by June 1990.

WMMS had been Malrite's most profitable property, the star of the company... And suddenly, with the unbelievably quick success of Z-100 in New York, Cleveland and WMMS became second-class citizens. And that was Malrite's mistake: to continually shove Z-100 and Scott Shannon in the face of the kids who had knocked themselves out and got paid slave wages to make WMMS. It caused so much resentment and hostility you could almost cut it with a knife.

— Walt Tiburski, former WMMS general manager

The changes were precipitated by continuing ratings declines, which in turn, led to a lack of musical focus. While WMMS had long been Malrite's most profitable station, WHTZ was now considered the model for the group. McCartney resigned at the end of January 1989, with operations manager Rich Piombino, who previously headed promotions, assuming his duties. Ric Bennett, an engineer by trade, began doing fill-in work as "Rocco the Rock Dog", and by September, hosted evenings. The station even revived the pre-Buzzard slogan "Where Music Means Something" on-air. Owing to further declines and competition from WNCX, which moved to classic rock, WMMS dropped all remaining CHR product in later November 1989, effectively changing format back to AOR. The Beacon Journal's Bob Dyer noted this took away WMMS's reputation of risk-taking, saying, "about 75 percent of the time, it's rocking in the past... and most of those older songs are safe, well-known tunes, the first or second cuts from an album". Along with now being programmed by out-of-towners, the station, which prided itself as the voice of the anti-establishment, was now being seen as the establishment. Dyer argued adding pop songs in 1983 eventually led to longtime listeners tuning out, as "trying to be all things to all people eventually blew up in the Buzzard mascot's beak". Kinzbach claimed playing Michael Jackson and Madonna "totally compromised ourselves... it was just pure greediness and ego on management's part, and believe me, it made me sick!"

Michael Luczak was hired as program director in July 1990, and Piombino resigned as operations manager ten days later. A Cleveland native, Luczak grew up listening to WMMS and frequently contacted Kid Leo, only to be told no job openings existed; Luczak worked on-air at WEBN in Cincinnati before moving to programming work. Luczak's first moves included reinstating Matt the Cat in middays and truncating a Sunday night new music show produced with Cleveland Scene from four hours to one. Ratings initially improved, with the station rebounding to first place in the Winter 1991 Arbitrons, aided by the station's emphasis on news updates during the Gulf War. While tying for fifth in the Spring 1991 book, WMMS returned to number one for the Summer 1991 book. WMMS and WHK became co-flagships for the Cleveland Browns Radio Network in 1991 through a three-year contract, with the team choosing the stations based on WMMS' promotional savvy. Luczak also overhauled the WMMS Buzzard's design, giving it a flat-top and mullet; Gorman later said it "looked like a cross between a skateboarder and the cuckoo for Cocoa Puffs bird".

WHK and WMMS moved to the Skylight Office Tower portion of Tower City Center on June 28, 1992. As Malrite did not sign any authorization for additional storage space, much of the station's tape and vinyl archives were moved over to the Seven Hills transmitter site in what turned out to be an insufficient, leaky and damp room, with a large portion now considered lost. Gorman later said after making a 1994 visit to the transmitter, "if the floods didn't get 'em [the tapes], the raccoons did".

=== From Malrite to Shamrock to OmniAmerica ===
The guys on WMMS, Flash and Frizzbone! Those are who I'm going to beat in Cleveland. They're going to be the quickest to go down. They have absolutely no talent! Doug [Podell, WNCX program director] sent me a tape of theirs. I don't know how people can listen to that garbage.

— Howard Stern, on his debut day on WNCX, August 31, 1992

The Spring 1992 Arbitron book, released in July, showed WMMS at second place among all age groups (behind WGAR-FM) and at first in morning drive and in the core 18–34 and 25–54 demographics. One month later, WNCX announced it signed up as an affiliate for The Howard Stern Show beginning on August 31, 1992, a substantial investment for the station. Through management directives, Kinzbach and Ferenc refused to mention Stern on the air and positioned themselves as community activists, while Stern ridiculed them as "Flash and Frizzbone"; John Lanigan at WMJI, however, actively traded on-air insults against Stern. The Summer 1992 book, completed two weeks after Stern's arrival, showed WMMS leading in 25–54 and at fourth overall, but WMJI's Lanigan, Webster and Malone leading in mornings. The Plain Dealer's Roberto Santiago called the Morning Zoo's "Operation: Payroll" intended to help lure a Navy payroll center to Cleveland, as having "almost killed the [show's] timing and wit". By May 1993, Santiago said the "wilting fast" Morning Zoo "...quickly became dated".

Matt the Cat was dismissed on December 11, 1992, over what the station called "budget problems." Matt's firing came one year before he was eligible for his pension and reportedly devastated morale, setting off speculation of additional talent leaving. It was symptomatic of a major financial crunch Malrite was in: the company was taken private in March 1989 through a $180 million leveraged buyout but due to "depressed ad demand" caused by the early 1990s recession, along with declining cash flow, Standard & Poors put Malrite's $115 million in junk bonds for downgrading, leaving the company unable to service its debt. Sinclair Broadcast Group was rumored to purchase WOIO in August 1992 after Malrite banker Shearson Lehman Brothers opened the station up for sale offers. Malrite opted to sell off its radio division; after months of rumors, Roy Disney–owned Shamrock Broadcasting agreed to acquire it for $300 million. Tiburski returned as WMMS-WHK general manager at Maltz' invitation to oversee the ownership changeover. The Malrite-Shamrock deal was completed on August 2, 1993, but prior to the close, Carl Hirsch, who bought WMJI in 1991, created a new holding company to purchase another Cleveland radio station.

WMMS's ratings, and that of the Morning Zoo, continued to decline substantially throughout 1993. WMMS ranked behind WMJI and WGAR-FM in the Winter 1992 Arbitron; the May 1993 Arbitrends placed WMMS at fourth in mornings, with Stern at number one. By August, the Zoo remained at fourth but the station fell to eighth place overall and at sixth place in the 25–54 demo; by October, the Zoo fell to sixth place overall but at third place in the 25–54. OmniAmerica, Hirsch's holding company, purchased WMMS and WHK from Shamrock on November 2, 1993, for $12 million (equivalent to $26.7 million in 2025), creating the first in-market FM duopoly. (Note: The deal was arranged where all stations owned by Hirsch's other company Legacy Broadcasting, which owned WMJI, were transferred to OmniAmerica.) OmniAmerica's other partners included Thacker and Tony Ocepik, and Gorman, WMJI's program director since 1991, was named WMMS operations manager. Luczak was dismissed as 1994 began. Staff were told to reapply for jobs with OmniAmerica, with several retained, including Ferenc but not Kinzbach; while Gorman preferred to retain Kinzbach and Ferenc as a team, their inability to compete against Stern made it sound like "they put a leash on Jeff ... they had a muzzle on him!"

The deal closed at 4 p.m. on April 15, 1994, following a celebrity-laden final edition of the Morning Zoo and on-air goodbyes from Dillon and Bennett. Off-air, the transition was problematic: former employees were accused of looting WMMS's album library, forcing Gorman to purchase $1,500 worth of compact discs at the last minute; several gold records and artwork were also reportedly stolen but later returned.

=== Buzzard Radio: The Next Generation ===
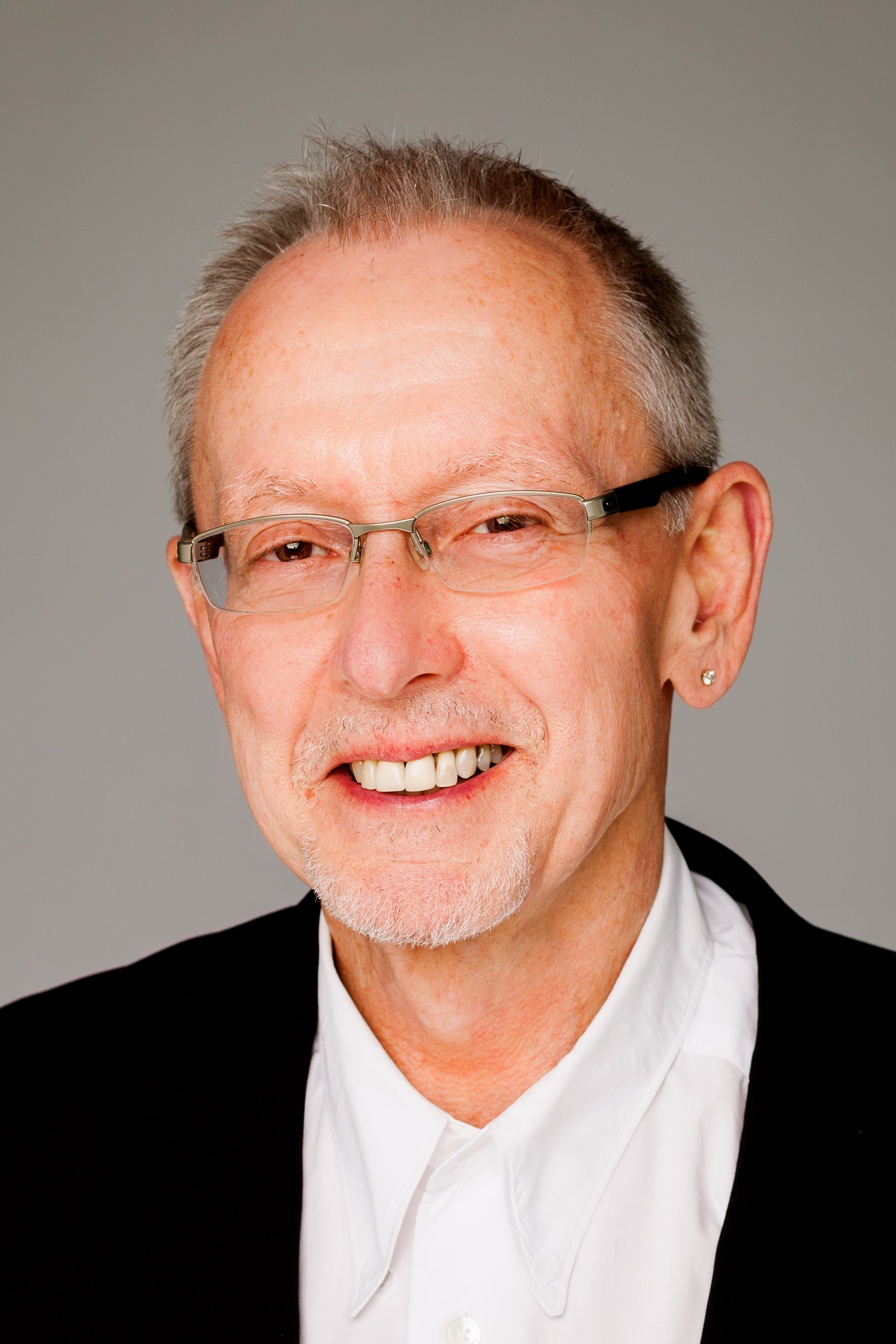
John Gorman

Upon taking over WMMS, Hirsch vowed the station would "stop living on its heritage" and bring back the attitude and cutting edge that defined it. Hirsch also dismissed rumors WMMS would steal Stern away from WNCX, promising WMMS would be "indigenous" to Cleveland. Gorman admitted it would take time for WMMS to re-establish itself, but suggested a possible adult album alternative format in-between WNCX's classic rock and WENZ's modern rock; Gorman said, "we're putting it together faster than the Rock and Roll Hall of Fame, but not as fast as Gateway". Branded "Buzzard Radio: The Next Generation", a reference to Star Trek: The Next Generation, Gorman also revived the original Buzzard design alongside artist Brian Chalmers. Ross Brittain co-hosted an interim morning show alongside Ferenc, Goldberg and "Spaceman Scott" Hughes. For Brittain, it was a chance to work during his non-compete clause after leaving WHTZ earlier in the year.

On June 3, 1994, WMMS hired WENZ morning duo Brian Fowler and Joe Cronauer to host the Zoo and sent out a publicity photo with Fowler and Cronauer wearing "B" and "J" sweaters and Buzzard-branded hoods covering their faces. The Brian and Joe Radio Show on the Buzzard Morning Zoo debuted in July after WENZ agreed to waive their non-competes. WMMS staged its first rock festival, Buzzard-Palooza, on July 23, 1994, at the Nautica Stage, but was cut short due to overcrowding and rowdy behavior. Cleveland Police wearing riot gear were called in as headliner Green Day took the stage, and 12 people were arrested amidst various minor injuries. WMMS staged a second Green Day performance two months later at Blossom Music Center at a near-record-low cost of $5 per ticket. Gorman later called Buzzard-Palooza "a turning point... that was really our coming out part to let Cleveland know we were now a different format... we realized something was really happening here".

Gorman originally intended to evolve WMMS to alternative rock from an AOR/alternative mix over a 12-month period, but listener reaction proved so strong that the transition only took four months. The change to alternative was made "official" on October 27, 1994. WENZ's iteration of the format was more broad-based with older music and new wave; Gorman likened WMMS to KROQ-FM and WENZ to WDRE in Long Island. While the change alienated many longtime listeners, many of whom switched to WNCX, WMMS boosted its ratings for the first time in years with a new, younger audience. Subsequent festivals, titled BuzzardFest, took place at Blossom in May 1995, September 1995 and again in May 1996. Billboard and Airplay Monitor magazines together named WMMS Rock Station of the Year (Medium Market) in 1995, and Modern Rock Station of the Year (Medium Market) in 1996. John Gorman was named Program Director of the Year (Rock) in 1995.

=== The Cleveland Funeral ===
When Stern reached number one in the May 1993 Arbitrends, WNCX program director Doug Podell promised "to throw the biggest funeral street party Cleveland has ever seen. We will publicly hang John Lanigan, Jeff Kinzbach and Ed (Flash) Ferenc (in effigy)". A native of Detroit, Podell frequently vacationed in Cleveland "just to listen to WMMS" and vowed to overtake WMMS in the ratings when he joined WNCX in 1990. After the Morning Zoo overtook Stern for second place in the June 1993 Arbitrends, a WMMS spokesperson vowed to "rain on Stern's parade" but it was WMJI and John Lanigan that remained competitive against Stern, preventing him from a number one Arbitron ranking throughout 1993. Stern again reached the top spot in the January 1994 Arbitrends and, with the Winter 1994 Arbitron, ranked number one for the first time, completing an 18-month turnaround for WNCX, which ranked 13th in mornings when he debuted.

On May 27, 1994, WNCX announced the funeral street party would be held on June 10, with dummies of Lanigan and the WMMS Buzzard destroyed by Stern at a strip club parking lot in The Flats. The festival was to also include a remote at the construction site for the Rock Hall and an appeance on WEWS-TV's The Morning Exchange. Prior to the funeral, Cleveland Scene featured Stern on their cover, prompting WMJI and WMMS to solicit for listeners to confiscate copies of Scene and deliver them to the station, and awarded $500 and ZZ Top concert tickets to the person who could deliver the most copies. The stunt forced Scene to spend $4,000 to print 6,000 replacement copies and cost both stations their business relationship with the magazine. Gorman called the Scene incident "just a funny little thing" and "these are the fun and games that go into competition". WMMS and Gorman operated with a bunker mentality in the days leading up to the event.

During the broadcast, Stern was dressed in an army uniform, declaring himself the "conquering general" of local morning ratings. While at the Rock Hall site, the satellite was jammed with an obscenity-laden recording—which Tiburski, now general manager for WNCX, claimed to have come from another radio station—resulting in Stern broadcasting on cellular phone and cancelling the WEWS interview. Back at the strip club, WMMS engineer William Alford, who used the credentials of a former WMMS engineer who did not attend, used wire cutters to sever a transmission line used for the remote, forcing it off the air for five minutes. Proclaiming to the audience "we are under attack! This is radio D-Day", Stern continued the show over the phone while Alford was arrested. As the wire cutting constituted a federal offense, an FCC official told the Plain Dealer WMMS's license could be revoked if it was revealed to have been involved directly with the incident. WMMS denied direct knowledge of the wire-cutting, but Thacker wrote in a memo, "it may be possible the reported action was nothing more than a publicity stunt engineered by our competitors", which Tiburski called "both laughable and ignorant".

Alford pled guilty to the wire-cutting by September, but Common Pleas Judge Timothy McGinty delayed sentencing so Cuyahoga County assistant prosecutor Craig Weintrab could further investigate any involvement by station executives in the wire-cutting. Management initially claimed Alford acted alone and denied any knowledge of the signal jamming. On May 13, 1995, a grand jury indicted WMMS promotions director Heidi Kramer (Klosterman) and associate Greg Smith on felony charges of attempted disruption of a public service and a misdemeanor of receiving stolen property via the Scene copies. Kramer was also cited for jamming on both the Stern remote and a Pink Floyd concert WNCX carried a few weeks earlier. An FCC spokesman said the agency was monitoring the indictments as two of the five charges pertained to broadcasting.

Kramer pled guilty to two of the charges and Smith pled guilty to a misdemeanor of breaking and entering. Judge Patricia Cleary, who oversaw the case, declined to incarcerate either. Judge McGinty sentenced Alford to ten days in jail and a $1,000 fine, and admonished him for violating Stern's first amendment rights and nearly inciting a riot; McGinty also criticized Stern as "a crude and obscene rabble-rouser". Stern blasted McGinty on-air and vowed to have him voted out of office, and endorsed his Democratic opponent in the May 1998 primary election, but McGinty was re-elected by a comfortable margin. Music director Doug Kubinski later argued the incident hurt the station in the long term, saying, "it absolutely killed the immediate momentum of WMMS. It cut the legs out".

=== Deregulation and "burying" the Buzzard ===
Despite signs of success, the stations were sold again: on April 22, 1996, WMMS and WMJI went to Nationwide Communications for $43.5 million (equivalent to $89.3 million in 2025) and WOMX-FM in Orlando. WHK was sold to Salem Communications two days later. The two deals came almost immediately after passage of the Telecommunications Act of 1996, creating "a fever pitch" among the industry to make deals, and followed a failed merger between OmniAmerica and Citicasters. Hirsch said, "make no mistake: after this sale, Nationwide is going to own radio in Cleveland". Nationwide, who took over on July 1 via a local marketing agreement, appointed separate general managers for WMMS and WMJI, intending to run them autonomously. Gorman resigned after being notified he needed to choose between one station or the other, and joined CBS Radio's alternative station in Detroit, which coincidentally was also a Stern affiliate. Gorman has since openly criticized the industry's current state and advocated for the viability of internet radio.

Under new general manager Bob Bellin, Nationwide conducted a two-month long nationwide search for Gorman's replacement, which ended in September 1996 with Bob Neumann, who previously programmed WNCX and WENZ. Neumann's hiring sparked over four months of speculation on a format change for WMMS, potentially to active rock, blending newer alternative hits and hard rock with classic rock tracks. This format flip took place on February 17, 1997: Neumann said "the one thing this station has lacked for a long time is a sense of fun, a party atmosphere", and "I'm glad to be out of the self-indulgent, whiny alternative world". The station now promoted itself as "The Real Buzzard is Back!" The changes also included moving Fowler and Cronauer to afternoon drive. Neumann later defended the format flip as the right thing to have done, noting how alternative rock eventually faded as a format several years later.

Spurred on by further industry consolidation, Nationwide was put up for sale and Jacor purchased it on October 27, 1997, for $620 million (equivalent to $1.24 billion in 2025). The sale came as WMMS's ratings started to improve following the format switch, and Jacor president David Crowl noted it was "definitely a station in transition... but it's going in the right direction". By July 1998, rumors surfaced that WMMS could move towards a classic rock orientation, dropping almost all newer songs, and be reliant on "frat boy humor". The deal closed on August 10, 1998, resulting in Neuman's departure. Greg Ausham took over as program director and dismissed multiple staffers including much of the morning show, intending to focus on music and positioning the station as mainstream rock. BLF Bash left after Jacor sought to automate overnight shifts across the station group and said by 2001, "they've got a machine in there now". Station liners and promos were now double entendre-laden, which according to Plain Dealer radio critic Roger Brown, was now "the closest you get to attitude from WMMS".

Our market research indicated the station was dead. The call letters have been tainted, the station was burnt, the staff had left. It's been changed and jilted so many times that there was no way to resurrect it. We looked for a heartbeat. It wasn't there.

— Greg Ausham, WMMS program director, October 1998

On October 2, 1998, Goldberg announced on-air the WMMS Buzzard would be given "a fond farewell" on November 1, along with an implied format change; Goldberg's message ended with a "thirty days 'til we bury the Buzzard" promo. General manager Jim Meltzer said the move came after management determined the station "needed to be blown up and given a fresh start". During the month-long "salute", Denny Sanders—then the program director for WMJI—returned to host an airshift and programmed the music at his discretion. Kid Leo also hosted an airshift and said on-air, "I don't know if the Buzzard is actually going away!" Brown was skeptical in his Plain Dealer column about the legitimacy of Jacor's motives and openly called it a publicity stunt intended to get listeners and attention. The Beacon Journal's Bob Dyer argued "the WMMS of legend died a long, long ago" and that the station's 1980s peak of popularity was in reality when it "was a bastion of money and power with no conscience".

WNCX disputed on-air that the Buzzard would be retired, citing public FCC records that saw no call sign change had been reserved and offered $5,000 to WMMS to prove their intentions. Two days before the supposed changes, on October 30, Goldberg announced that management—surprised at the volume of e-mails, faxes and phone calls from listeners—opted to keep the call letters and Buzzard in place. This reversal, according to management, cancelled a format change to CHR as "KISS 100.7". Brown pilloried the move in his Plain Dealer column, calling it a scam "from beginning to end" and writing, "it still has the nose-stinging scent of something management cooked up to breathe new life into a dying station". The Fall 1998 Arbitron showed WMMS with a substantial increase in listeners, leading Brown to conclude "the scam worked". During the campaign, Jacor agreed to be purchased by Clear Channel Communications for $3.5 billion (equivalent to $6.72 billion in 2025). (Note: Clear Channel was renamed iHeartMedia in 2014.)

The moves and cancelled format change decimated the airstaff. While Tim "Slats" Guinane was hired for afternoon drive at the end of 1998, Meltzer conceded, "we're taking as much time as we need to put together a solid lineup". Cousin Deke noted how "shocked at how small the staff was" when he joined WMMS, "it seemed like they’d pared things down going into that format flip that never happened and never got around to re-staffing the place." By June 1999, Plain Dealer writer Tom Feran openly floated the idea of WMMS swapping call signs and formats with WZLE, a station in Lorain that Jacor purchased and flipped to CHR as "KISS 104.9" weeks earlier. Clear Channel announced in August 2000 that their stations, including WMMS, would move to a combined facility at the former Centerior Energy headquarters in Independence: the moves were completed in 2001. Goldberg, largely relegated to a Sunday morning shift, left in October 2004.

WMMS again became the flagship for the Cleveland Browns Radio Network in 2001 after Clear Channel transferred the broadcast rights from WMJI, which became the flagship for the team's 1999 relaunch; the move was made largely to boost WMMS' ratings. The Browns remained on WMMS until 2013, when the team moved to WNCX and competing sports stations WKNR and WKRK-FM.

=== Morning drive troubles ===
A morning show is the cornerstone of just about every radio station. Continuity is the first mark of a champion. Look at John Lanigan [on WMJI], look at Howard Stern [on WNCX]. They've been on forever. If you keep changing players on a morning show, you can't develop an identity for a radio station.

— John Gorman

When WMMS switched to active rock in February 1997, The Brian and Joe Radio Show was moved to afternoon drive. Fowler later said the move came after management wanted "... a spicier, dirtier morning show; they said, 'Get more locker room talk'. We said, 'That's not us, we're not going to do that.'" Following the takeover by Jacor, Fowler and Cronauer were transferred to co-owned WMVX in what was termed a "hardball, make-up-your-minds soon" offer.

In an eleven-year period between February 1997 and April 2008, the following shows aired in morning drive on WMMS:

- February 1997–September 1997: Liz Wilde, Cory Lingus (Gallant), Sal the Mailman and D.C. (Wilde, who according to Fowler, was hired to be "Howard Stern with breasts", is fired and successfully sues the station over wrongful termination; Neumann later said, "I can't comment on our first morning attempt.")
- September 1997–October 1997: Lingus, Sal the Mailman and D.C.
- October 1997–August 1998: Danny Czekalinski, Darla Jaya and Lingus (Jaye and Lingus are fired after the Jacor takeover.)
- August 1998–January 1999: Danny Czekalinski
- January 1999–October 1999: Matt Harris
- October 1999–August 2000: Dick Dale with Rick Eberhart (Despite a controversial "You Don't Know Dick" billboard campaign, this show was cancelled after Dale relocates back to Jacksonville.)
- August 2000–January 2001: Bob Wolf and John Mulrooney (Wolf and Mulrooney was simulcast with WPYX in Albany, New York, where the show originated from prior. Wolf left WMMS to work at WPYX and Mulrooney acrimoniously breaks up and feuds with him.)
- January 2001–November 2001: John Mulrooney
- December 2001–September 2003: Cousin Deke; after April 2002, a rotation including "Rocko", Eberhart and Tom Megalis, with Eberhart and Megalis as lead hosts by September 2002
- September 2003–January 2004: Eberhart and Megalis (Eberhart said in October 2003, "They've basically told us, 'It's you guys forever; the audience is sick of all the changes.' We'll see." They are fired three months later.)
- January 2004–September 2004: Various interim hosts and music
- September 2004–June 2006: Sean Kelly, Cristi Cantle and Hunter Scott (Cantle later called the show's failure "a real team effort" and compared herself unfavorably to Johnny Manziel: "too young, too overconfident and too drunk to handle the responsibility... however I have no intentions of playing Canadian football".)
- June 2006–April 2008: The Bob & Tom Show, as an affiliate

When WMMS switched to The Bob & Tom Show, Plain Dealer reporter Julie E. Washington noted it was WMMS's thirteenth different morning show since Kinzbach and Ferenc left in 1994. Mark "Munch" Bishop, sports director for WMMS and WMJI, anchored sports updates on most of these shows from 1998 until 2007. WTAM afternoon host Mike Trivisonno, who by 1998 desired to move to mornings for the purpose of competing against Stern, filled in for Matt Harris on April Fools' Day 1999 as part of a cluster-wide stunt. Comedian Chuck Booms, who was in the running to host the Morning Zoo in 1996 but lost out to Wilde, publicly lobbied for the gig; Booms hosted a fill-in show on WTAM with sportscaster Chuck Galeti in early January 2004 which was rumored to be a trial run for a WMMS morning show.

The instability became notorious alongside what the Plain Dealer's Clint O'Connor called WMMS's "fluctuating... ill-defined mix of classic rock/hard rock/alt rock" and fed perceptions Clear Channel did not want the station to be competitive, a charge Fowler and Cronauer disputed. Kevin Metheny, operations manager for Clear Channel's Cleveland cluster, said in September 2002, "...people want WMMS to be relevant again. I don't think we can blow it up and reinvent it too many more times." Gorman said of WMMS in September 2003, "I don't know who their audience is anymore" and later referred to Bob & Tom as a cost-cutting move that could benefit WNCX's newer, local morning-drive show.

=== Hot talk evolution with Maxwell, Rover and Alan Cox ===
Bo Matthews became WMMS program director in April 2004; a Youngstown native, Matthews had desired to work in the Cleveland market for years. After Slats left the station to join WXTM, Matthews hired Maxwell (Benjamin Bornstein) to replace him, hoping to "create a content destination in the afternoon". The Maxwell Show gradually evolved from airing mostly music to all-talk in the afternoon. Metheny called Maxwell's improving ratings in 2007 "a project that's working". In September 2007, WMMS re-branded to "100.7" with the Buzzard removed completely from the station's website; Matthews said, "nobody's killing anything... Chief Wahoo is not on every piece of Indians promotional material... Ronald McDonald is not in every McDonald's commercial... We're not losing the letters. All we're doing is shifting an image." Brian Chalmers, who left WMMS in 1999 to join WKYC's art department, sent Buzzard artwork to the station pro bono but never heard back despite multiple inquires. A 2007 NPR story on the station noted, "today, WMMS is owned by Clear Channel and The Buzzard has been grounded".

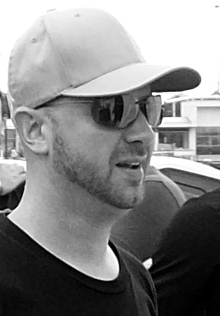
Rover (Shane French)

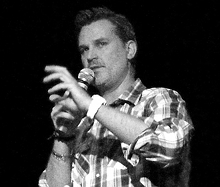
Alan Cox

The station picked up Rover's Morning Glory on April 1, 2008: Gorman compared signing the show, and host Shane "Rover" French, to a "coup". Rover was CBS Radio's Midwest replacement for Howard Stern in 2006 under their Free FM concept, and the show moved from WXTM to Chicago. After the Chicago station cancelled Rover, CBS transferred him back to Cleveland but kept him under a prior affiliate contract and not a talent contract; thus, Rover was not subject to a non-compete clause. Coinciding with Rover's arrival, WMMS re-branded back to "The Buzzard" with a U.S. Route shield-inspired logo. Rover's show has been called "testosterone-fueled" by The Plain Dealer, a "juggernaut" by Cleveland Magazine, and by the station as "a once-in-a-generation talent who... saved the legendary Buzzard from extinction".

Despite high ratings, relations between Maxwell and management were strained after an on-air prank claiming Metallica would play a free show in the WMMS parking lot, and he left the station in November 2009. Alan Cox took over in afternoons the following month; Talkers described Cox's show in 2012 as "a bold anomaly worthy of industry attention". WMMS's program director role has changed multiple times in recent years: Chris Tyler replaced Matthews in the role on February 17, 2014, then was replaced in December 2017 by Keith Abrams, senior vice president of programming for iHeartMedia's North Ohio region. Former Lex and Terry producer Jason Carr became assistant program director on February 1, 2018, and took over for Abrams in 2020. Rob Anthony (Kopec), executive producer for iHeartMedia's classic rock format center, replaced Carr in July 2022.

As part of a five-year contract extension between the Cleveland Indians (Note: Renamed the Cleveland Guardians at the start of the 2022 season.) and WTAM, the team's flagship since 1998, WMMS was announced as co-flagship, simulcasting a majority of games per season. WMMS also became co-flagship for the Cleveland Cavaliers Radio Network in 2014 (rebranded the Cavaliers AudioVerse in 2022) alongside WTAM, which had been the team's flagship since 1990. The Cavaliers' contract with iHeartMedia and WTAM-WMMS has been extended in 2017, 2020, and again in 2026.

iHeartMedia announced on March 21, 2021, that WMMS and the other iHeart Cleveland stations would move to a combined studio/office facility at the Six Six Eight building in downtown Cleveland, using cloud storage technology. The relocation process was completed in July 2022.

== Current programming ==
WMMS features Rover's Morning Glory in mornings, Corey Rotic middays and Alan Cox in afternoons, while other talent is voice-tracked internally. John Clay Wolfe is heard on Saturday mornings and The House of Hair with Dee Snider airs on Sunday evenings.

The station serves as the FM flagship for both the Cavaliers AudioVerse and the Cleveland Guardians Radio Network.

== HD Radio ==
WMMS has broadcast in HD Radio since April 25, 2006. Launched c. March 2007, WMMS-HD2 carried classic alternative in October 2007, active rock in 2008 and classic alternative again in 2011. By July 2011, WMMS-HD2 featured alternative rock, and on May 23, 2012, was relayed over low-power translator W256BT (99.1 FM) as "99X". WMMS-HD2/W256BT rebranded as "ALT 99.1" in December 2017, then became a charter affiliate of Black Information Network on June 30, 2020.

A realignment of HD subchannels on July 12, 2024, had Black Information Network moved to WMMS-HD3, relayed over Beachwood, Ohio, translator W266CJ (101.1 FM); WMMS-HD2/W256BT relaunched as "Throwback 99.1", with a classic hip-hop format. WMMS-HD2/W256BT flipped again to sports radio on September 2, 2025, featuring Fox Sports Radio and a content partnership with Rock Entertainment Sports Network.

Broadcast translators for WMMS
Call sign	Frequency	City of license	FID	ERP (W)	HAAT	Class	Transmitter coordinates	FCC info	Notes
W256BT	99.1 FM	Cleveland, Ohio	154527	250	256 m (840 ft)	D	41°26′32.20″N 81°29′28.40″W	LMS	WMMS-HD2 relay
W266CJ	101.1 FM	Beachwood, Ohio	144180	250	−297 m (−974 ft)	D	41°26′32.2″N 81°29′28.4″W	LMS	WMMS-HD3 relay

== Bibliography ==
- Adams, Deanna R. (2010). Images in America: Cleveland's Rock and Roll Roots. Mount Pleasant, South Carolina: Arcadia Publishing. ISBN 9780738577869.
- Berti, Jim; Bowman, Durrell (2011). Rush and Philosophy: Heart and Mind United. Chicago: Open Court Publishing. ISBN 9780812697162.
- Carr, Daphne (2007). 33⅓: Nine Inch Nails' Pretty Hate Machine. London: Continuum. ISBN 9780826427892.
- Chapman, Marshall (2003). Goodbye, Little Rock and Roller. New York: St. Martin's Press. ISBN 9780312315689.
- Denisoff, R. Serge (1988). Inside MTV. New Brunswick, New Jersey: Transaction Publishers. ISBN 9780887388644.
- Denisoff, R. Serge (1986). Tarnished Gold: The Record Industry Revisited. New Brunswick, New Jersey: Transaction Publishers. ISBN 9780887386183.
- Dolan, Marc (2012). Bruce Springsteen and the Promise of Rock 'n' Roll. New York City: W. W. Norton & Company. ISBN 978-0-39308-135-0.
- Edwardson, Ryan (2009). Canuck Rock: A History of Canadian Popular Music. Toronto: University of Toronto Press. ISBN 9780802099891.
- Goldberg, Danny (2009). Bumping Into Geniuses: My Life Inside the Rock and Roll Business. New York: Gotham Books. ISBN 9781592404834.
- Harris, Larry; Gooch, Curt; Suhs, Jeff (2009). And Party Every Day: The Inside Story of Casablanca Records. New York: Backbeat Books. ISBN 9780879309824.
- Hoskyns, Barney (2010). Lowside of the Road: A Life of Tom Waits. New York: Broadway Books. ISBN 9780767927093.
- Keith, Michael C. (1997). Voices in the Purple Haze: Underground Radio and the Sixties. Westport, Connecticut: Praeger. ISBN 9780275952662.
- Marsh, Dave (2004). Bruce Springsteen: Two Hearts: The Definitive Biography, 1972–2003. New York: Routledge. ISBN 9780415969284.
- Masur, Louis P. (2009). Runaway Dream: Born to Run and Bruce Springsteen's American Vision. New York: Bloomsbury Press. ISBN 9781608191017.
- Nicks, Joan; Sloniowski, Jeannette (2003). Slippery Pastimes: Reading the Popular in Canadian Culture. Waterloo, Ontario: Laurier University Press. ISBN 9780889203884.
- Neer, Richard (2001). FM: The Rise and Fall of Rock Radio. New York: Villard Books. ISBN 9780679462958.
- Pegg, Nicholas (2011). The Complete David Bowie. London: Titan Books. ISBN 9780857682901.
- Popoff, Martin (2004). Contents Under Pressure: 30 Years of Rush at Home and Away. New York: ECW Press. ISBN 9781550226782.
- Reynolds, Simon (2006). Rip It Up and Start Again: Postpunk 1978–1984. New York: Penguin Books. ISBN 9780143036722.
- Spitz, Marc (2009). Bowie: A Biography. New York: Crown Publishing. ISBN 9780307716996.
- Wolff, Carlo (2006). Cleveland Rock and Roll Memories. Cleveland: Gray & Co. ISBN 9781886228993.

== Documentaries ==
- Cummings, Tom (2008). Radio Daze: Cleveland's FM Air Wars (Film). Dave Rogant, Mike Olszewski (Producers). Cleveland: Harvard 131 Films.
- Harrington, Ashley (2009). Hello, Cleveland! (Film). Syracuse, New York: Syracuse University.
- Heydt, David (2009). The History of Howard Stern: Act III (Radio). New York City: Howard Stern Productions.
- McFadyen, Scot (2010). Rush: Beyond the Lighted Stage (Film). Sam Dunn (Producer). Toronto: Banger Films.
