= Beau Coup =

American rock band

- Origin: Cleveland, Ohio
- Genres: Pop, rock
- Years active: 1983–1990s; 2015–present
- Labels: Agora, Rock 'n Roll, Scotti Brothers, Amherst
- Website: beaucoupband.com

"Born & Raised on Rock & Roll"

Dennis Lewin, Bill March, Frank Amato, Tommy Amato

Beau Coup is an American rock band from Cleveland, Ohio, primarily active during the mid- to late-1980s. Although they sustained a mostly local/Midwestern following, they did experience some minor national mainstream success with their 1987 Billboard charting single, "Sweet Rachel" and its accompanying album.

== History ==
Beau Coup began in 1983 as a recording project, performing as Pop Opera, before changing their name to Beau Coup at the end of 1984. The project was started by vocalist Tommy Amato (not to be confused with the prolific session drummer of the same name, also from Cleveland), guitarist Mike McGill, and future Kiss drummer Eric Singer. Eventually, Amato invited keyboardist and songwriter Dennis Lewin to join the project while Lewin was still playing in a band with former Michael Stanley Band lead guitarist Jonah Koslen called Jonah Koslen and the Heroes.

After the Heroes disbanded later in 1984, Lewin, along with Tommy Amato's older brother (and fellow singer) Frank and bassist Bill March, joined the project. With help from Agora Theatre and Ballroom proprietors Henry LoConti Sr. and Henry LoConti Jr. and the Agora Record Label, the band released their self-titled 6-song EP, known informally as their White Album, featuring mostly Lewin's songs. The first single released from that EP was "Still In My Heart" which was authorized for airplay by 98.5 WGCL's WNCX General Manager and Program Directors. The song became a top 10 record on the station. Subsequently, Rock 'n Roll Records, a subsidiary of Scotti Brothers Records signed the band and the song was distributed by CBS Records in 1984. Program Director John Gorman (radio) at WMMS also took great interest in Beau Coup, giving them extensive airplay and inviting them to participate in many station events as well.

=== Mainstream Success ===
After having struggled with Scotti Brothers Records and ultimately being released by the label, Beau Coup's debut full-length album, Born & Raised on Rock & Roll was finally released in 1987 in LP, CD, and cassette format on the Amherst record label in the USA and on A&M Records of Canada and Europe. By this point, only four official band members - Tommy Amato, Frank Amato, Dennis Lewin, and Bill March - were pictured on the back cover (as displayed in the image to the right). However, long-time members guitarist Mike McGill and drummer Don Krueger are among the contributors listed as "studio musicians".

While Born & Raised on Rock & Roll included several of the tracks originally featured on the 1984 EP, it was a new song on the full-length album that ultimately brought them exposure on the charts. The song “Sweet Rachel” written by Dennis Lewin, reached #80 on the Billboard Hot 100 singles chart and received substantial radio airplay internationally. The video for "Sweet Rachel" also featured on video shows in the US and abroad, including MTV and USA Video Hits. Other Lewin songs from the album, including two singles originally from the EP (“Still in My Heart” and “Somewhere Out in the Night”, the latter actually a re-recording of the original EP version), along with the title track “Born & Raised on Rock & Roll”, were all picked by Billboard as “Hot Picks”.

=== Subsequent Activities ===
Although Beau Coup disbanded in the early 1990s, they reunite occasionally to perform for several special events.

Another Beau Coup song from the Born & Raised on Rock & Roll album, the Lewin-penned "Jane" is about the legendary rock music critic Jane Scott, and for this reason, the group were invited to perform at her memorial service which was held at the Rock & Roll Hall of Fame in Cleveland, Ohio in 2011.

In 2017, the band reunited and released a live album to celebrate the 30-year anniversary of the Born & Raised on Rock & Roll album. This live performance featured the classic lineup of Tommy Amato, Frank Amato, Lewin, March, McGill, and Krueger, along with additional guitarist Paul Sidoti and backing vocalists Debi Lewin and Jennifer Lee. Guitarist Neil Zaza also performs on one track.

== Band members ==
=== Constant members ===
- Tommy Amato ~ Lead Vocals / Background Vocals
- Frank Amato ~ Lead Vocals / Background Vocals
- Dennis Lewin ~ Keyboards / Background Vocals / Percussion
- Bill March ~ Bass Guitar / Background Vocals
- Donald Krueger ~ Drums

=== Notable members ===
- Tim Pierce – Guitar (1984 and on "Sweet Rachel")
- Eric Singer – Drummer
- Mike McGill ~ Guitars
- John Franks ~ Drums
- Jimmy Clark ~ Drums
- Billy Sullivan ~ Guitar / Background Vocals
- Danny Powers ~ Guitar
- Paul Sidoti – Guitar / Background Vocals
- Paul Wolf Christensen ~ Sax / Keyboards / Background Vocals
- Debi Lewin ~ Background Vocals
- Jennifer Lee ~ Background Vocals
- Rodney Psyka ~ Percussion and Background Vocals
- Michael P. Tyler ~ Background Vocals / Background Keyboards / Keyboard Tech

== Discography ==
=== EP (Extended Play) release ===
Beau Coup ("White Album") (Agora Records) – NR 15514 (1984) (out of print)

Side One

1. Still In My Heart
2. You Made Me Believe (In Miracles)
3. Someday We'll Be Together

Side Two

1. Don't You Believe It
2. Desperation Blvd
3. Somewhere Out In The Night

All music and lyrics composed by Dennis Lewin except for "Desperation Blvd" written by Frank Amato, Mike McGill, Bruce and Cliff Norton.

=== Full-length album ===
Born & Raised On Rock & Roll (Amherst Records) – AMH 93316 (1987)

Side One

1. Born & Raised On Rock & Roll
2. Somewhere Out In The Night (re-recording of version featured on original EP)
3. Find The Way
4. Jane

Side Two

1. Sweet Rachel
2. Uptown L.A.
3. Still In My Heart
4. Never Stop
5. Hold On Me

All music and lyrics composed by Dennis Lewin except for "Never Stop" written by Tommy Amato, Mike McGill, and Dennis Lewin, and "The Hold On Me" written by Frank Amato and Mike McGill.

=== Live album ===
- 30th Anniversary Live (2017)

=== Compilation ===
- Then and Now (2006)

=== Singles ===
- "Still In My Heart" (Agora Records) – AG 82734-1 (1984) (out of print)
- "Still In My Heart" (Rock 'n' Roll Records/Scotti Brothers, Entertainment/CBS, Inc.) – ZS4 04632-3 (1984) (out of print)
- "Somewhere Out In The Night" (Rock 'n' Roll Records/Scotti Brothers, Entertainment/CBS, Inc.) – ZS4 04768-3 (1985) (out of print)
- "Sweet Rachel" (Amherst Records) - AM 318 (1987)
- "Born & Raised on Rock-N-Roll" (Amherst Records) - AM 322 (1987)
