= Rover's Morning Glory =

Hot talk radio show

- Genre: Hot talk
- Running time: 4 hrs. (weekdays, 6–10 a.m.)
- Country of origin: United States
- Language: English
- Home station: WMMS in Cleveland
- Hosted by: Rover (Shane French); Duji (Susan Catanese)
- Starring: Chocolate Charlie (Mike Toomey); Jeffrey LaRocque; Anthony Snitzer; Krystle Elyse
- Original release: March 24, 2003
- Opening theme: "Antichrist Superstar" by Marilyn Manson
- Website: roverradio.com

Rover's Morning Glory is a nationally syndicated hot talk morning drive time radio show originating from Cleveland rock station WMMS (100.7 FM). Hosted by radio personality Rover (Shane French), the show first began at cross-town rival WXTM (92.3 FM) in 2003, quickly becoming one of the top-rated shows in the Cleveland radio market.

The show briefly moved to Chicago in 2006 to serve as a regional replacement for The Howard Stern Show, mostly in Midwestern markets, following Stern's move to Sirius Satellite Radio. Since the move to WMMS in 2008, the show has been syndicated by iHeartMedia through its subsidiary Premiere Networks.

== History ==
=== CBS Radio (2003–08) ===
In March 2003, radio personality Rover (Shane French) joined Cleveland modern rock station WXTM (92.3 FM). It was here that Rover created Rover’s Morning Glory. The name itself was thought of just days before the show's premiere and is a double entendre for morning wood. In March 2005, the show began to syndicate, airing on rock station WAZU in Columbus.

In October 2005, WXTM owner CBS Radio announced the selection of Rover's Morning Glory to fill morning show vacancies on several of its FM stations resulting from Howard Stern's move to Sirius Satellite Radio; Rover was tabbed for former Stern affiliates in Midwestern markets. As part of the arrangement, production for Rover's Morning Glory moved to Chicago rock station WCKG in early January 2006, and affiliates in Cincinnati, Detroit, Memphis, Rochester and St. Louis were added. WCKG cancelled Rover in late July following negative critical reception and conflicts with management, and the show was moved back to Cleveland.

Memphis and Rochester were the only stations to remain affiliates following the return to Cleveland. Rochester continued carrying the show until 2020.

=== iHeartMedia (2008–present) ===
In February 2008, Rover reportedly informed CBS management that he had signed a contract with cross-town rival WMMS Cleveland. Rover's Morning Glory was subsequently barred from airing during the remainder of the contract with CBS. The next month, Rover formally announced he would move the show to WMMS, launching on April 1, 2008. WMMS management discovered Rover was not subject to a non-compete clause as CBS Radio carried the show in Cleveland under an affiliate contract and not a talent contract, expediting his debut.

Rover's Morning Glory began broadcasting from WMMS on April 1, 2008. WMFS, the show's Memphis affiliate since January 2006, abruptly flipped its format and dropped the show in May 2009. In January 2010, Rover's Morning Glory returned to the airwaves in Columbus, Ohio, at WRXS after negotiating with the station for more than a year. The show's stint in Columbus proved to be unsuccessful as WRXS changed to a 1990s format that June, canceling Rover's Morning Glory in the process. Cleveland Police briefly detained Ky-Mani Marley after the singer threatened Rover for comments made during an April 20, 2010, in-studio interview. On October 26, 2010, Rover hired a witch doctor to curse LeBron James after the NBA star left the Cleveland Cavaliers. Rover has been voted best radio host by Cleveland Scene readers in 2009, 2014, and 2015.

In June 2013, Rover's Morning Glory began airing a tape delay version on satellite radio over the Extreme Talk channel (XM 243). After XM's merger with Sirius, the service stopped carrying Rover's Morning Glory. The show can now be accessed on the iHeartRadio platform.

In September 2013, Rover's Morning Glory has added six new affiliates: WAMX Huntington, West Virginia, WKGB-FM Binghamton, New York, WNDE Indianapolis, WRKK Williamsport, Pennsylvania, WTFX-FM Louisville, WXEG Dayton, WZZR West Palm Beach and WCZR Vero Beach. In February 2015, the show was dropped from WAMX. In August 2015, the show was dropped from WXEG. However, as of May 2017, the show is airing on the station once again.

In 2015, the show launched a premium subscription service called RMG Plus. This feature enables listeners to not only watch a live video stream of the entire show each morning, but to access full-show archives dating back to 2012, as well as being able to watch or listen to the "Aftermath," which airs Monday-Thursday from 11:05 am to noon ET and features cast members Charlie, Jeffrey LaRocque, and Anthony Snitzer recapping the day's episode and taking calls from listeners, completely uncensored. Fridays from 11:05 am to noon ET is a continuation of show that's exclusive to RMG Plus as well and features an uncensored recap of the day's show, as well as various videos and other topics that they weren't able to discuss on the air, due to time constraints or FCC rules.

On January 23, 2017, the show added its first new affiliate in over a year with WBFX, "101.3 the Brew", in Grand Rapids, Michigan.

In March 2017, Rover launched Rolling Glory One, a $2.6 million, 45-foot 2017 Prevost X3-45 touring bus previously used by Ariana Grande. The bus features a fully functioning mobile studio equipped with video and audio equipment. The show uses the bus to travel to affiliate cities, festivals, and other popular events. On January 6, 2018, Rolling Glory One led the Perfect Season 2.0 Parade, protesting the Cleveland Browns 0–16 season. Rolling Glory One is sponsored by Travel America and PETRO Stopping Centers.

== Stunts ==
Rover purportedly tied helium balloons to various objects to see how many it would take to lift them off the ground. One was supposedly a kitten, "Jinxy the Cat", which escaped on a 45-minute flight, followed closely by Cleveland television stations and prompting 911 calls from concerned listeners. The stunt was copied by radio stations in Philadelphia, Denver and in New York by Nick Cannon. Rover later said "No, there was no cat out there. It was all theater of the minds."

== Dare Dieter ==
Dominic Dieter began work on the show as a phone-screener. When a full-time on-air position became available, he volunteered to start a segment called Dare Dieter, in which he would do any stunt or dare submitted by listeners every Friday. Dieter said if he ever turned down a dare he would go back to phone-screening, a promise that was often held over his head during the segment by listeners. The feature was ended by Rover and CBS Radio management after Dieter suffered a serious injury and temporary paralysis during a stunt involving a barrel roll in July 2007. Although it is not certain whether the segment will return, an on-air conversation between Dieter and Rover on April 1, 2008, suggested that Dieter may attempt to bring it back.

== Events and special projects ==
=== RoverFest ===
An annual beer-drinking festival and concert to celebrate all-things-Rover.

The first RoverFest was held June 20, 2008. West 6th Street in the Warehouse District of downtown Cleveland was closed, a large stage was built, and food and beer vendors were present. A competition for girls to be in Rover's annual Miss Morning Glory Calendar was conducted as well. Approximately 10,000 people made their way through the festival, surpassing expectations.

RoverFest 2009 was held July 24, 2009, at Voinovich Park in downtown Cleveland. The event again featured a search for girls to be in the 2010 Miss Morning Glory Calendar, along with comedian Jim Florentine, Darryl "D.M.C." McDaniels from Run-D.M.C. and the band Saliva. A television special was taped to air on MavTV in October 2009. The event sold out with over 10,000 people attending.

RoverFest 2011 was held August 13, 2011, in Eastlake, Ohio at Classic Park. Sick Puppies, Saving Abel, and Coolio performed as main acts. As well as local bands, including "BEST ORIGINAL BAND" contest winner, Pirates of the Burning River. Comedian Jim Florentine co-hosted the event along with DJ E-V. As usual, the calendar search was held, as well as skits related to the show.

=== RMG Golf Outing ===
An annual golf outing event held to celebrate end of the summer in Rochester, New York, a long time affiliate with the show.

=== Miss Morning Glory Calendar ===
In 2003, Rover produced his first Miss Morning Glory Calendar (for the 2004 calendar year). The show conducts a search for local, non-professional girls to be in the calendar and offers cash and other prizes to the girl who is crowned Miss Morning Glory, who gets to be featured on the calendar's cover. A large party is held for the release of the calendar (usually in November or December), which usually has all 12 girls in the calendar and everyone from the show on hand to autograph copies of the calendar.

=== War on the Shore ===
In July 2005, Dieter fought professional boxer Eric “Butterbean” Esch in a bout billed as “War on the Shore”. Months earlier, Dieter called Esch a fat slob on the air, and the two got into a fight in the studio. Over the next couple of months Dieter trained with a professional fight instructor for his first boxing match. Rover worked with the City of Cleveland to shut down a street in the downtown area, had a ring erected in the middle of the road and brought in beer-vending trucks. Rover told the city he wasn't sure how many people would attend, but guessed 750. Police estimated over 12,000 people came out to see the three-round fight, forcing the fight to start almost an hour early because of crowd control concerns. Esch knocked Dieter down a number of times during the fight, but each time Dieter was able to get up before the ten-count. It ended in a unanimous decision for Esch on all judges’ scorecards, while Dieter suffered a broken rib. Afterwards, Esch expressed a great respect for Dieter's ability to withstand the punishment given by a professional fighter, and the two became friends. Esch has since been in-studio and participated in other events with the show.

=== The League of Extraordinary Morons ===
The League of Extraordinary Morons consists of "Jackass"-style stunts where cast member compete to win money or a new car. The segment airs on a weekly basis, typically on Friday, consisting of physical and eating challenges.

Season 1 pitted Chocolate Charlie (Mike Toomey), Dieter, Rob Garguilo, and Dumb (Shaun Street) competing to win a 2011 Kia Soul. The challenges were as follows:

- Week 1 - Drinking a blender concoction of disgusting items including chewed bubble gum, live earth worms, tobacco juice, clam juice, anchovies, sardines, wet dog food, dry dog food, live crickets, apple cider vinegar, poached fish testicles, hot sauce, curdled milk, raw eggs, cigarette butts, and tomato juice strained through used panties. Who ever could drink the concoction quickest without puking, won.
- Week 2 - Targets were painted on the bare chest of each competitor. The opponent would then shoot paintballs at the target of the opponent to garner points. Highest point total won.
- Week 3 - Only two competitors competed in barefoot cactus soccer. The winner was determined by who scored the most goals in a finite time period.
- Finals Week 1 - Dieter and Dumb competed in a tackle football game, where the ground was littered with thumb tacks. The competition was named "The Field of Screams."

== Controversies ==
=== 2006 “Weird Al” interview ===
An incident on the September 21, 2006, broadcast sparked controversy when, during an interview with "Weird Al" Yankovic, the crew asked about the death of Yankovic's parents, causing him to become audibly upset. At the end of the interview, Yankovic hung up abruptly. This was followed by numerous angry calls from both concerned listeners and Al's publicist, during which Rover defended his line of questioning.

=== SuccessTech suicide photo leak ===
After the 2007 SuccessTech Academy shooting, the "Rover's Morning Glory" website leaked a crime scene photo taken of the gunman after his suicide. A Cleveland policeman, Walter Emerick, was later found to have taken the picture using his personal cell phone camera. Rover stated on the air it was his intent to show kids the real final result of a school-shooting (the perpetrator lying dead). Steve Loomis, president of the Cleveland police union, claimed the picture could have been taken for legitimate evidentiary purposes. Notably, the gunman was wearing a Marilyn Manson shirt when he died, the same band that made the show's opening theme.

=== Homophobic comments ===
In April 2012, during a "best of" (a replay from a previously aired show) segment, Dieter replied to a listener's email on air. The email was from a father who had recently seen his teenage daughter kissing another girl. Dieter stated, "You should get one of your friends to screw your daughter straight." GLAAD characterized Dieter's statement as advocating corrective rape and called for his immediate suspension. The following Monday, April 30, The Plain Dealer reported that Clear Channel Cleveland Operations Manager Keith Abrams had disciplined Dieter. Although Abrams did not reveal the extent of the disciplinary action, Dieter was not on air for that morning's show. However, the show did air a prerecorded apology from Dieter: "I want to genuinely apologize to anyone who may have been offended by what I said. I regret what I did say. My comments were inappropriate. They were inexcusable, and just downright stupid. And I want to make it clear – there was absolutely no intention to promote physical or sexual violence." According to Aaron McQuade, director of news and field media for GLAAD, WMMS will air several public-service announcements stressing parental acceptance of a child's sexual orientation. The station has also invited Equality Ohio to become part of the WMMS Community Advisory Board.

== Television projects ==
- Rover was a Cleveland Browns pregame reporter for CBS affiliate WOIO-TV Cleveland for two seasons. He would roam the stadium parking lots partying with fans prior to the game.
- Rover was a commentator on Rover's Fightfest TV, a mixed-martial-arts fighting program that aired on the SportsTime Ohio network.
- A pilot for a reality-TV program based on Rover's Morning Glory has been filmed and produced. It was shown at the Miss Morning Glory Calendar Release Party in 2009.

== Awards and recognition ==
- Nominated Radio & Records Morning Show of the Year, 2005
- Winner Best Morning Radio Show Cleveland Scene 2004, 2005, 2007, 2014, 2015
- Winner Best Morning Radio Show in 2007 Cleveland Free Times Reader's Poll
- Rover named one of Cleveland's Most Interesting People by Cleveland Magazine, January 2007

== Affiliates ==
List of Rover's Morning Glory affiliates
Media market	State	Station	Ref(s)
Vero Beach	Florida	WCZR	
West Palm Beach	Florida	WZZR	
Binghamton	New York	WKGB-FM	
Rochester	New York	WAIO	
Akron–Canton	Ohio	WRQK-FM	
Cleveland	Ohio	WMMS	
Mansfield	Ohio	WFXN-FM	
Youngstown	Ohio	WNCD	
Allentown	Pennsylvania	WZZO	
Erie	Pennsylvania	WRKT	
Williamsport	Pennsylvania	WRKK	
