= John Michael (broadcaster) =

American sports broadcaster (born 1972)

- Born: John Michael; 1972 (age 53–54); Aliquippa, Pennsylvania, U.S.
- Sports commentary career
- Team: Cleveland Cavaliers
- Genre: Play-by-play
- Sport: National Basketball Association

John Michael (born 1972) is an American sports broadcaster who is currently the TV play by play announcer for the Cleveland Cavaliers of the National Basketball Association (NBA). From the 2011–12 to 2018–19 seasons, he served as the team's radio play by play announcer.

== Early life and education ==
Michael attended high school at Sewickley Academy. He graduated from the University of Notre Dame with degrees in mechanical engineering, law, and business administration. After earning his J.D. degree, Michael worked as a trial lawyer for five years in construction law for K&L Gates.

== Career ==
Inspired by hearing radio broadcasts of high school football games, Michael began broadcasting high school and college sports part-time in Western Pennsylvania in 2000, while continuing to work full-time as a trial lawyer. In 2003, he was hired as the play-by-play broadcaster for the Hagerstown Suns, then the Class-A affiliate of the San Francisco Giants. Michael went on to broadcast for several minor league ice hockey teams, including two seasons each with the Johnstown Chiefs, the Springfield Falcons, and the Lake Erie Monsters. In the 2004-05 ECHL season, while working for the Chiefs, he was named the ECHL Broadcaster of the Year, and was selected to call the 2005 ECHL All-Star Game on NHL Radio.

In 2009, Michael was hired by the Columbus Blue Jackets to host pregame and postgame shows, serve as a rinkside reporter, and conduct interviews. Before starting the job, Cleveland Cavaliers director of broadcasting Dave Dombrowski (not to be confused with the baseball executive of the same name) had Michael record several demo tapes of Cavaliers games, which the organization kept. On October 6, 2011, the Cavaliers announced that they had hired Michael as the play-by-play announcer for game broadcasts on the Cavaliers AudioVerse.

On September 23, 2019, the Cavaliers announced that Michael had been named the play-by-play broadcaster for Cavaliers television broadcasts on Fox Sports Ohio (now FanDuel Sports Network Ohio). He replaced former broadcaster Fred McLeod, who had died two weeks prior.

== Personal life ==
Michael is married to Julie Maund. They met while attending college at Notre Dame.
