= Kid Leo =

American radio executive and DJ

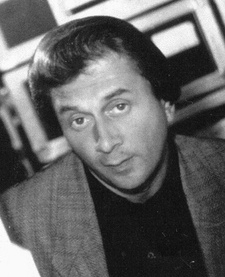
- Kid Leo in 1980
- Born: Lawrence James Travagliante; October 20, 1950 (age 76); Cleveland, Ohio, U.S.
- Education: Cleveland State University
- Occupations: Radio personality; record company executive; media consultant
- Spouse: Jackie Travagliante
- Children: Valeri, Dion

Lawrence James Travagliante (born October 20, 1950), better known by his on-air moniker Kid Leo, is a radio station and record company professional. He is especially known for his work as a radio personality and disc jockey. He began working in radio in 1973 at noted Cleveland, Ohio, rock station WMMS (100.7 FM, "The Buzzard"). During his 16-year tenure, WMMS was consistently one of the highest-rated radio stations in the country.

From 1988 to 2002, he changed professions to work as an executive at Columbia Records. Since 2004, he has worked for on Sirius XM Radio. He serves as both general manager and afternoon DJ on Little Steven's Underground Garage (channel 21). Travagliante also operates his own consultancy, LJT Entertainment.

== Early life, family and education ==
Travagliante was born and raised in Cleveland, Ohio. He graduated from Our Lady of Lourdes Central High School then attended Cleveland State University for 12 quarters, carrying different majors. Over 50 years later, the school awarded him an honorary doctorate.

== WMMS ==
Kid Leo started at WMMS in Cleveland, Ohio, in February 1973. He became the afternoon drive DJ in 1974, holding that time slot until he left the station in December 1988. In 1977, he was promoted to music director, then in 1986 became operations manager. “To many, Kid Leo was WMMS. For sixteen years he was the pulse of the station, pumping music and life into the veins of listeners.” He was known for embracing new acts and was credited with introducing many artists in the Cleveland market and giving them more advantage with greater national exposure. Some of those artists were Bruce Springsteen, John Mellencamp, Pat Benatar, Roxy Music, Cyndi Lauper, The Pretenders, New York Dolls, and Southside Johnny. Kid Leo played a biographical role in the music video of "Make Me Lose Control," a 1988 Billboard Hot 100 No. 3 hit single by Eric Carmen.

While at WMMS, Kid Leo became involved in the campaign to bring the Rock and Roll Hall of Fame to Cleveland. His on-air work is represented as part of the permanent radio exhibit in the Rock and Roll Hall of Fame.

== Columbia Records ==
Kid Leo joined Columbia Records in 1989 as Vice President of Artist Development. His first responsibilities were to oversee the Alternative, Jazz, Metal and Dance departments, and strengthen their presence within the company. He was named the label liaison for The Rolling Stones' “Steel Wheels” tour and collaborated with the band and their management on behalf of Columbia. He instituted the first promotion department at a major label that was solely dedicated to the Adult Album Alternative (AAA) format. Kid Leo was directly involved with the campaigns that introduced Alice In Chains, Shawn Colvin and Train. In 2002, he left Columbia Records but remained a consultant for it through 2004.

== LJT Entertainment ==
In 2002, Kid Leo formed LJT Entertainment LLC. The company is a music- and media-focused consultancy whose clients have included Columbia Records, the Rock and Roll Hall of Fame, and Renegade Nation. LJT Entertainment's offices are located in Southport, North Carolina.

== Underground Garage ==
Since 2004 Kid Leo has been Program Director for Little Steven's Underground Garage, a channel on Sirius XM Radio that was developed by Little Steven Van Zandt. In 2021 he was promoted to General Manager. He worked closely with Van Zandt in applying 24/7 format rules to the concepts that Little Steven uses on his own terrestrial-radio syndicated program. Kid Leo is also on the air in the Underground Garage (Sirius XM channel 21). His show airs Wednesday through Friday from 4 p.m. ET until 7 p.m. ET. As General Manager he guides an on-air staff that includes Michael Des Barres, Lenny Kaye, Slim Jim Phantom, Kelly Ogden, and Palmyra Delran.

== Charitable work and public service ==
Kid Leo sat on the Board of Directors of the T.J. Martell Foundation for 35 years. It is a music industry-based charity which raises funds for research in the areas of cancer, leukemia and AIDS.

== Honors and awards ==
Kid Leo received many industry awards. In 1980, he was named one of the Heavy Hundred: The High and Mighty of the Music Industry in Rolling Stone magazine. He was also named Best Disc Jockey by Playboy magazine in their January 1987 issue. For his efforts in helping secure the Rock Hall, former Cleveland mayor, US senator and then-Ohio governor George Voinovich presented him with the key to the city in 1990. His radio gravitas was also referenced in the director's cut of Cameron Crowe's 2000 motion picture Almost Famous. Cleveland Magazine designated in 2002 that Kid Leo was among the 30 people who defined Cleveland. In 2003 he was inducted into the Radio and Television Broadcasters' Hall of Fame of Ohio. In 2013, CNN named Kid Leo one of the ten All-Time Great DJs.

In 2022, Cleveland State University conferred him with the honorary degree Doctor of Humane Letters.

== Personal life ==
Travagliante and his wife Jackie reside in North Carolina. They have a son Dion and a daughter Valeri.
