= The Maxwell Show =

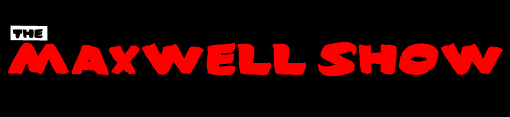
- Original show logo
- Genre: Hot talk
- Running time: 4 hrs. (weekdays, 3–7 pm)
- Country of origin: United States
- Language: English
- Home station: WMMS/Cleveland
- Starring: Maxwell (Pawley Bornstein); Dan Stansbury; Chunk (Tiffany Peck); Krackerman (Dana Smith); Captain Showbiz (Bo Matthews)
- Original release: April 19, 2004 – November 20, 2009
- Website: maxwellshow.com (archive)

The Maxwell Show was a hot talk radio show which aired weekday afternoons on Cleveland rock station WMMS (100.7 FM). The show began in April 2004, and over the next five years, grew to become the Cleveland radio market's #1 afternoon program in several key demographics. However, relations between show host Maxwell (Pawley Bornstein) and WMMS owner Clear Channel steadily grew strained, and in November 2009 the show was cancelled.

== History ==
Ohio native Maxwell (Pawley Bornstein) was hired on for the WMMS afternoon drive in April 2004 following the departure of Slats (Tim Guinane) for rival station WXTM. An experienced on-air personality, Maxwell (a.k.a. Max Logan) had already worked for a number of rock stations before joining WMMS: WEBN/Cincinnati; WDVE/ and WXDX-FM/Pittsburgh; WXTB/Tampa; and WIYY/Baltimore. Joining Maxwell were: WMMS music director Dan Stansbury, representing the younger male audience; Krackerman (Dana Smith), who, until his firing in 2007, provided the show's black perspective; Chunk (Tiffany Peck), a young female phone screener whose role grew significantly following Krackerman's exit; WMMS program director Bo Matthews (Alex Gutierrez), known on the show as Captain Showbiz; Chuck Galeti (then of the local CBS affiliate WOIO) who phoned in daily sports updates until 2008 when a heated on air confrontation with Maxwell drove him to quit; Andre Knott of WMMS sister station WTAM, serving as Galeti's replacement for the duration of the show's run; and local comedian Ryan Dalton, a frequent guest.

The Maxwell Show began as a rock/talk hybrid, but gradually became all talk. The show usually began with conversations regarding the day-to-day lives of the cast, and later moved on to more topical stories in the news and pop culture. Maxwell would occasionally interview guests over the phone and, to a lesser extent, in the studio. Humor was always a major component of the show; jokes about Maxwell being Jewish were known to generate controversy in the Cleveland Jewish community. The cast also delved into serious issues, occasionally recounting some of the darker episodes from each of their personal histories. As children, both Maxwell and Stansbury were victims of sexual abuse, and Maxwell struggled with an addiction to heroin before entering rehab in 2007.

=== Feuds ===
Often referred to by co-host Dan Stansbury as "the never ending powder keg of anger," Maxwell was known for having a number of feuds with other radio personalities over the years: Rover (Shane French) of Rover's Morning Glory until his (Rover's) move from rival WKRK-FM to WMMS in mid-March 2008 (Maxwell maintained he was "in the Rover business" during their mutual time at the station, though there were indications otherwise, such as Maxwell repeatedly voicing hopes that an F5 tornado would rip through RoverFest 2009); Opie and Anthony and comedian Jim Norton and fellow Clear Channel host Mike Trivisonno, airing directly opposite The Maxwell Show on WTAM.

=== Metallica prank ===
On April 3, 2009, The Maxwell Show went on the air claiming (falsely) that Metallica – in Cleveland for the 2009 Rock and Roll Hall of Fame induction ceremony the very next day – was playing a free show in the WMMS parking lot that evening. Citing legal concerns, management immediately directed Maxwell to tell listeners that it was only a prank, and later placed him on probation for 90 days. Mutual discontent grew during contract renewal negotiations, and in November of that year, the show was cancelled.

== After WMMS ==
On Wednesday, October 27, 2010, WNCX (98.5 FM) announced it had picked up The Maxwell Show for the station's morning shift. The move replaced former morning co-hosts Scott Miller and comedian Jeff Blanchard, and show producer Dave Jockers. Regarding their dismissal, Program Director Bill Louis commented that "sadly, this a bottom-line business." The Maxwell Show was the fourth program in five years to air weekday mornings on WNCX following Howard Stern's move to satellite radio.

The show began airing on WNCX the following Monday, November 1, 2010; officially, the show did not begin until 7:30 AM, though as a kind-of stunt, the station played the Beatles' song "Maxwell's Silver Hammer" on a constant loop in the hours leading up to the show's debut. Joining host Maxwell at WNCX were: Stansbury and Chunk, both from the show's initial run on WMMS; and a new addition, Ribz (Micah Manus), who began several months into the show's second run. Cleveland Scene described Maxwell's first week on the air as a "scorched-earth campaign" against his former station and its owner, Clear Channel. Early metrics were "through the roof": visitors to the WNCX website increased tenfold, and online streaming tripled. WNCX cancelled The Maxwell Show on August 25, 2011, less than ten months after the show's arrival at the station. Cleveland Scene speculated that, in addition to "flagging ratings," WNCX cancelled the show to make room for a new morning show at sister station WKRK-FM as that station transitioned to a new sports format.

Following the show's cancellation at WNCX, Maxwell began work under the name Slater at alternative rock station WKQX-LP/Chicago. On July 30, 2012, Maxwell took over as the morning host on Chicago classic rock station WLUP-FM; the station website describes the Chicago version of The Maxwell Show (also known as The Maxwell Morning Show) as "a mix of news, sports, entertainment, everyday life and the best music ever made." Maxwell was joined by co-hosts Rob Hart and John Czahor. On September 12, 2014, Maxwell and Czahor were released from WLUP-FM, as part of a station-wide revamping effort.

In November 2013, Maxwell Show cohost Dan Stansbury returned to Cleveland radio as the afternoon host at alternative rock station WLFM-LP, remaining until January 1, 2014 when the station changed to a Spanish music format. In June 2014, he became the morning host at active rock station WRQK-FM/Canton with co-host Matt Fantone.
