= Cavaliers AudioVerse =

Regional play-by-play radio network

- Type: Radio network
- Country: United States
- Headquarters: Cleveland, Ohio
- Broadcast area: Ohio; West Virginia (limited); Pennsylvania (limited)
- Owner: Cleveland Cavaliers and iHeartMedia
- Affiliation: NBA
- Affiliates: 17 (including 2 flagships)
- Official website: nba.com/cavaliers/broadcast

The Cavaliers AudioVerse is a regional radio network that carries English-language coverage of the Cleveland Cavaliers, a professional basketball team in the National Basketball Association (NBA). Cleveland stations WTAM (1100 AM, 106.9 FM) and WMMS (100.7 FM) are the network's flagships. The network also includes fifteen affiliates in the U.S. states of Ohio, Pennsylvania and West Virginia, all owned by iHeartMedia: eleven AM stations, one of which is relayed over a low-power FM translator; three full-power FM stations; and one HD Radio digital subchannel relayed over a low-power FM translator.

Tim Alcorn is the current play-by-play announcer. In addition to traditional over-the-air AM and FM broadcasts, network programming airs on SiriusXM satellite radio; and streams online via SiriusXM Internet Radio, TuneIn Premium, and NBA League Pass Audio.

== History ==
In 2008, longtime flagship WTAM signed a five-year contract extension with the Cavaliers through the 2013–14 season; in 2011, a Cavs spokesman stated there were "multiple years" remaining on the team's contract with WTAM, without specifying an end date. In 2014, WTAM owner iHeartMedia (formerly Clear Channel) announced a new "multi-year" contract with the team; this new arrangement also established simulcasts on WTAM sister station WMMS. Additional affiliates were added in the Columbus, Dayton and Cincinnati markets, coinciding with LeBron James' heavily publicized return to the team.

John Michael took over as the team's lead play-by-play announcer starting in the 2011–12 season following the retirement of longtime radio voice Joe Tait. Michael was teamed with color analyst and former Cavs player Jim Chones. After the death of lead TV play-by-play announcer Fred McLeod prior to the start of the 2019–20 season, Michael was reassigned to that position, with Tim Alcorn—lead sports announcer and station manager at Cavaliers radio affiliate WEOL in Elyria—being hired as Michael's successor. The radio network was rebranded as the "Cavaliers AudioVerse" beginning with the 2022–23 season. Chones retired after the 2025–26 season.

As part of a rights renewal deal between the team and iHeartMedia, the network was restructured to consist of affiliates owned solely by iHeartMedia.

== Announcers ==
Play-by-play	Pregame/Postgame
Tim Alcorn	Mike Snyder, Brad Sellers

== Station list ==
Network stations as of the 2026–27 Cavaliers season
City/media market	State	Station	Frequency	Network status
Akron–Canton	Ohio	WHLO	640 AM	Affiliate (select games)
Akron–Canton	Ohio	WRQK-FM	106.9 FM	Affiliate
Ashland	Ohio	WNCO	1340 AM	Affiliate
Chillicothe	Ohio	WCHI	1350 AM	Affiliate
Cleveland	Ohio	WTAM	1100 AM	Flagship
Cleveland	Ohio	WMMS	100.7 FM	Flagship
Cleveland	Ohio	W295DE	106.9 FM	WTAM relay
Columbus	Ohio	W287CP	105.3 FM	WZCB-HD2 relay
Columbus	Ohio	WZCB-HD2	106.7-2 FM	Affiliate
Dayton	Ohio	WONE	980 AM	Affiliate
Defiance	Ohio	WONW	1280 AM	Affiliate
Lima	Ohio	WIMA	1150 AM	Affiliate
Mansfield	Ohio	WFXN-FM	102.3 FM	Affiliate
Marion	Ohio	WMRN	1490 AM	Affiliate
Toledo	Ohio	WCWA	1230 AM	Affiliate (select games)
Youngstown	Ohio	WNIO	1390 AM	Affiliate (select games)
Youngstown	Ohio	WNCD	93.3 FM	Affiliate
Erie	Pennsylvania	WJET	1400 AM	Affiliate
Erie	Pennsylvania	W244DX	96.7 FM	WJET relay
Parkersburg	West Virginia	WLTP	910 AM	Affiliate

=== Network map ===
Cavaliers AudioVerse stations. Click on each marker to reveal details.; Flagship stations; Affiliates (including translators)
