= Jane Scott (rock critic) =

American journalist (1919–2011)

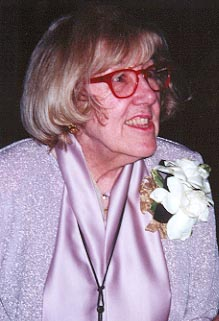
- Scott in 2000
- Born: May 3, 1919; Cleveland, Ohio, United States
- Died: July 4, 2011 (aged 92); Lakewood, Ohio
- Occupations: Music critic; journalist

Jane Scott (May 3, 1919 – July 4, 2011) was an American music journalist and critic. She was an influential rock critic for The Plain Dealer in Cleveland, Ohio. During her career she covered every major rock concert in Cleveland and was on a first name basis with many stars. Scott was the first major female rock critic, and then the oldest in a field that was mostly dominated by men. Until her retirement from the newspaper in April 2002 she was known as "The World's Oldest Rock Critic." She was also influential in bringing the Rock and Roll Hall of Fame to Cleveland.

Scott was born at Mt. Sinai Hospital in Cleveland, Ohio in 1919. She is a 1937 graduate of Lakewood High School in Lakewood, Ohio, and a 1941 graduate of the University of Michigan, where she earned a Bachelor of Arts degree, majoring in English, Speech and Drama and she also earned a teachers certificate. Scott had one brother, Will (also deceased); she had no children and never married.

== Career history ==
Scott's first experience with journalism was as a staff member of the school newspaper, the Michigan Daily, while she attended the University of Michigan. In 1942, the Cleveland Press newspaper hired Scott as a secretary in their advertising department. Later that year, she enlisted in women's branch of the Navy, the WAVES (Women Accepted for Volunteer Emergency Service), rising to the rank of Lieutenant. After leaving the Navy, she took some additional classes at the Wilcox College of Communication in Cleveland to learn typing and shorthand. Around this time, she also began working for a suburban newspaper, the Chagrin Valley Herald, as the Women's Editor. This also opened doors for her as a stringer reporter for The Plain Dealer. As such, she was not a member of The Plain Dealer staff, but she reported on events in the Cleveland suburbs of Chagrin Falls, Russell, Bentleyville and Pepper Pike.

On March 21, 1952, Cleveland disc jockey Alan Freed promoted The Moondog Coronation Ball at the Cleveland Arena which is recognized as the first rock and roll concert, but Scott was not in attendance at this historic show. Three days later, on March 24, 1952, at age 33, Scott was hired as an assistant society reporter at The Plain Dealer, covering the local social scene of A-List weddings and Debutante Balls. After two years as a general reporter, Scott got her own column called "Senior Class," covering topics of interest to senior citizens, which she wrote for almost twenty years.

In 1958, she inherited the "Boy & Girl" column; at the time, it was a full page in the newspaper each Saturday. Aimed at seven- and eight-year-olds, it was the beginning of the present day rock coverage in The Plain Dealer. The column name became "Young Ohio" and eventually was called "Teen Time." Scott described her reporting beat as "covering everything from pimples to pensions." Scott covered the Beatles' first Cleveland performance at Public Hall on September 15, 1964, and traveled to England in 1966 to cover their tour. She also interviewed the Beatles before their August 14, 1966, show at Cleveland Stadium. "When the Beatles appeared on Ed Sullivan's show, I knew what the kids really wanted to read. Once I found rock, I was never interested in anything else." At the time, The Plain Dealer was the only major American newspaper to have a full-time music critic on staff, thus Scott is considered to be the world's first rock critic. In the 1960s, in preparation for her eventual work as The Plain Dealer's Rock Editor, she spent every Saturday night for six straight years at the WEWS television station for the tapings of the "Upbeat" show.

By May 1966, Scott's "Teen Time" column became a five-page cornerstone for a new idea in The Plain Dealer, a tab format entertainment section called "Go With The Plain Dealer." Published every Friday, the "Go" name lasted only four weeks and was renamed "The Action Tab." That name changed again to the present "Friday Magazine" on June 4, 1976. Throughout the 1970s, 1980s and 1990s she wrote the weekly "What's Happening" column in The Plain Dealer's Friday Magazine, along with regular artist interviews, album reviews and concert reviews. She appreciated all forms of rock and made friends of many musicians. Lou Reed said she was one of the only people to treat him with respect in his early years as a performer; Lyle Lovett called her a "true friend"; she herself often told the story of accompanying Jimi Hendrix to buy a blue Corvette.

In 1987, The Plain Dealer attempted to replace Scott but was met with strong public outcry and backlash, including feature stories in People Magazine, MTV News and The Wall Street Journal, resulting in the newspaper's editors backing down from their plans. Scott was inducted in 1991 into the Cleveland Press Club Hall Of Fame. Scott retired in April 2002, after 50 years at The Plain Dealer. Scott estimated that she had attended over 10,000 concerts and music events during her career. Jane's signature interview question was: 'What was the name of your high school?'

Scott died on July 4, 2011, of complications of Alzheimer's disease.

== Favorites and hobbies ==
The first record that she ever purchased was "Sent For You Yesterday (And Here You Come Today)" by Jimmy Rushing of Count Basie's orchestra. Scott listed her favorite rock artists: from the 1960s, The Beatles; 1970s, Bruce Springsteen, her favorite rock star of all time; 1980s U2; and 1990s, Lyle Lovett. Her favorite rock song was "Black Water" by the Doobie Brothers. Her favorite rock album was Springsteen's Born to Run. In August 1975, a review of hers stated "His name is Bruce Springsteen. He will be the next superstar." She wrote about that review later: "Springsteen's 1975 show at the Allen Theatre was memorable. He stood like a pirate, with a cap over his eye and a ring in his left ear, pulling us all into fascinating stories of his youth. I reviewed this show and over the objections of skeptical editors, predicted Springsteen would be a superstar. Lucky for me, Bruce came through."

Scott was an early supporter who campaigned to bring the Rock and Roll Hall of Fame and Museum to Cleveland, and was interviewed on ABC's Good Morning America television show during the grand opening of the Museum in September 1995. She had even made a cameo appearance on The Drew Carey Show. Besides music, Scott's hobbies included handwriting analysis and being an avid deltiologist, with a collection primarily of Cleveland landmarks, and she was a member of the Western Reserve Post Card Society. Scott also was a chirologist, once causing the Who to be late going on stage for a Cleveland concert because she was reading their palms backstage.

== Memorial at the Rock and Roll Hall of Fame ==
On August 28, 2011, a memorial service was held for Jane Scott at the Rock and Roll Hall of Fame and Museum, which was attended by over 900 people, and included speakers from local Cleveland music industry, family and friends. On July 5, 2012, the Rock Hall unveiled a lifesize bronze memorial statue, which has been permanently installed in the Reading Room of the Rock Hall's Library & Archives. The statue was created by Cleveland area sculptor and past president of the Cleveland Institute of Art, David Deming. The Rock Hall also announced the completion of an agreement with the Scott family for the Rock Hall's Library & Archives to acquire Scott's papers, notebooks, and photos relating to her music journalism career in Cleveland.

During a concert performance on July 1, 2017, at Cleveland Stadium, U2 included an image of Jane Scott on the video screen accompaniment for their encore performance of Ultraviolet.

Currently a documentary and limited series entitled Hello Cleveland! is in production by Director/Producer Kate Perotti and Edendale Pictures.
