= Cleveland Magazine =

American monthly magazine

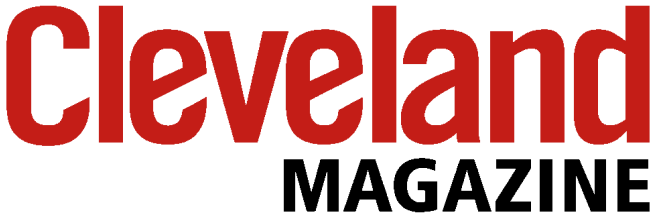
- Editor: Dillon Stewart
- Categories: City magazine
- Frequency: monthly
- Circulation: 282,000
- Publisher: Denise Polverine
- Founder: Lute Harmon Sr.
- First issue: April 1972
- Company: Great Lakes Publishing Company
- Country: United States
- Based in: Cleveland, Ohio
- Language: English
- Website: clevelandmagazine.com
- ISSN: 0160-8533

Cleveland Magazine is a monthly magazine focused on Northeastern Ohio, USA. It was founded in 1972. The inaugural April 1972 issue featured a young Dennis Kucinich, a frequent profile subject of the magazine. Published monthly by the Great Lakes Publishing Company, it features articles on dining, travel & leisure and arts & entertainment in Northeast Ohio. Its editor is Dillon Stewart, and its publisher is Denise Polverine. It is a member of the City and Regional Magazine Association (CRMA).

== Rating the suburbs ==
Its most popular issue is the annual "Rating the Suburbs," which examines which communities in Greater Cleveland are best suited to live in based on values such as quality of schools, proximity to hospitals, crime rankings and home values. Critics say the rankings are biased towards newer, outer ring suburbs. Neighborhoods in the city of Cleveland proper are not ranked at all, which critics suggest perpetuates the stereotype that Cleveland is not livable. The top-ranked suburb for 2017 was Richfield Village, Ohio.
