= 100.9 FM =

FM radio frequency

The following radio stations broadcast on FM frequency 100.9 MHz:

== Argentina ==
- Activa in Vera, Santa Fe
- Comunal de Nelson in Nelson, Santa Fe
- LRS768 Contacto in Las Parejas, Santa Fe
- del Sol in Mendoza
- La Voz Rafaela in Rafaela, Santa Fe
- Metropolis in Villa María, Cordoba
- Nuevo Día in Santa Cruz
- Life in San Carlos de Bariloche, Bariloche
- Adrenalina in Corrientes
- Dinamo in Salta
- La Matera in Quilmes, Buenos Aires
- Urbana in San Francisco, Córdoba
- Laberinto in Las Toninas, Buenos Aires
- Frecuencia Río in Neuquén
- Libertad in Caleta Olivia, Santa Cruz
- Urbana in Frontera, Santa Fe
- Top Pilar in Pilar, Córdoba
- Mega in Tandil, Buenos Aires
- Provincia in Santiago del Estero
- Líder in San Martín, Buenos Aires

== Australia ==
- CONNECT FM 100.9 in Bankstown, New South Wales
- 2MRR in Gloucester, New South Wales
- 6NME in Perth, Western Australia
- Port Stephens FM in Port Stephens
- Radio National in Bega, New South Wales
- Radio National in Bundaberg, Queensland
- SBS Radio in Darwin, Northern Territory
- 7TTT in Hobart, Tasmania
- Vision Radio Network in Warrnambool, Victoria

== Brazil ==
- Rádio 100 (ZYC 418) in Fortaleza, Ceará

== Canada (Channel 265) ==
- CBAF-FM-8 in Weymouth, Nova Scotia
- CBJX-FM in Chicoutimi, Quebec
- CBLA-FM-3 in Wingham, Ontario
- CBQH-FM in Dryden, Ontario
- CBWK-FM in Thompson, Manitoba
- CHXX-FM in Donnacona, Quebec
- CIPM-FM in Peguis, Manitoba
- CIYM-FM in Brighton, Ontario
- CKAP-FM in Kapuskasing, Ontario
- CKHA-FM in Haliburton, Ontario
- CKTO-FM in Truro, Nova Scotia
- CKUA-FM-4 in Grande Prairie, Alberta
- CKUV-FM in High River/Okotoks, Alberta
- CKUY-FM in Maple Creek, Saskatchewan
- VF2048 in Stewart Crossing, Yukon
- VF2095 in David Inlet, Newfoundland and Labrador
- VF2573 in Brochet, Manitoba
- VF2586 in Gadsby, Alberta

== China ==
- CNR Music Radio in Harbin
- Radio Sihui in Sihui, Zhaoqing

== Malaysia ==
- Bernama Radio in Kuching, Sarawak
- Minnal FM in Central Kelantan
- Selangor FM in Selangor
- Sinar in Langkawi, Kedah

== Mexico ==
- XHCAA-FM in Aguascalientes, Aguascalientes
- XHCHE-FM in Chetumal, Quintana Roo
- XHDOM-FM in Iguala, Guerrero
- XHEJD-FM in Poza Rica, Veracruz
- XHERN-FM in Montemorelos, Nuevo León
- XHI-FM in Morelia, Michoacán
- XHKC-FM in Oaxaca, Oaxaca
- XHLAB-FM in Lagunas/Barrio de la Soledad, Oaxaca
- XHLO-FM in Chihuahua, Chihuahua
- XHMAJ-FM in Mariscala de Juárez, Oaxaca
- XHMTV-FM in Minatitlán, Veracruz
- XHONG-FM in Ojinaga, Chihuahua
- XHPALV-FM in Alto Lucero-Xalapa, Veracruz
- XHPAPM-FM in Apatzingán, Michoacán
- XHS-FM in Tampico, Tamaulipas
- XHSA-FM in Saltillo, Coahuila
- XHSBH-FM in Sabinas Hidalgo, Nuevo León
- XHSM-FM in Ciudad Obregón, Sonora
- XHSON-FM in Mexico City
- XHVM-FM in Piedras Negras, Coahuila

== Philippines ==
- DYHG in Roxas City, Capiz

== United Kingdom ==
- Classic FM at Wrotham, Kent

== United States (Channel 265) ==
- KAEH in Beaumont, California
- KAKN in Naknek, Alaska
- KARY in Grandview, Washington
- KAUJ in Grafton, North Dakota
- KAXZ-LP in Wichita, Kansas
- KAYO (FM) in Wasilla, Alaska
- KBAR-FM in Victoria, Texas
- KBOQ in Lima, Montana
- KBUG in Big Spring, Texas
- KCDV in Cordova, Alaska
- KCKP in Laurel, Missouri
- KCLY in Clay Center, Kansas
- KDEL-FM in Arkadelphia, Arkansas
- KDVW-LP in Montrose, Colorado
- KESA (FM) in Eureka Springs, Arkansas
- KFSK in Petersburg, Alaska
- KGBL in Lakin, Kansas
- KGLC in Miami, Oklahoma
- KHLL in Richwood, Louisiana
- KHMU in Buttonwillow, California
- KHMV-LP in Half Moon Bay, California
- KHOM in Salem, Arkansas
- KJXP-LP in Nacogdoches, Texas
- KKFJ-LP in Kailua-Kona, Hawaii
- KMIX in Tracy, California
- KNEC in Yuma, Colorado
- KNEY-LP in Kearney, Nebraska
- KNHP-LP in Corpus Christi, Texas
- KNMJ in Eunice, New Mexico
- KOWZ in Blooming Prairie, Minnesota
- KPEG-LP in Lompoc, California
- KQSR in Yuma, Arizona
- KWDJ in Johannesburg, California
- KRFN in Sparks, Nevada
- KRRY in Canton, Missouri
- KSKR-FM in Sutherlin, Oregon
- KSMJ-LP in Edmond, Oklahoma
- KSXY in Forestville, California
- KTSO in Sapulpa, Oklahoma
- KVCB-LP in Vacaville, California
- KVMK in Wheelock, Texas
- KWFB (FM) in Holliday, Texas
- KWIA in Newell, Iowa
- KWKK in Russellville, Arkansas
- KWLP in Peach Springs, Arizona
- KWTN in Allen, Nebraska
- KXGL in Amarillo, Texas
- KXIN in Wagner, South Dakota
- KZMK in Sierra Vista, Arizona
- KZNM in Towaoc, Colorado
- WAAI in Hurlock, Maryland
- WAKB in Waynesboro, Georgia
- WALX in Selma, Alabama
- WANY-FM in Albany, Kentucky
- WAYA-FM in Ridgeville, South Carolina
- WAYC in Bedford, Pennsylvania
- WBDC in Huntingburg, Indiana
- WBFY-LP in Belfast, Maine
- WBNO in Bryan, Ohio
- WBZG in Peru, Illinois
- WCDO in Sidney, New York
- WCJM in West Point, Georgia
- WCMP in Pine City, Minnesota
- WDYD-LP in Merrill, Wisconsin
- WEIO in Huntingdon, Tennessee
- WFFR-LP in Roosevelt Park, Michigan
- WFMI in Southern Shores, North Carolina
- WHHH in Speedway, Indiana
- WHPO in Hoopeston, Illinois
- WHSP-LP in Black Mountain, North Carolina
- WIFM in Elkin, North Carolina
- WIQO-FM in Forest, Virginia
- WJAQ in Marianna, Florida
- WJAW in Mcconnelsville, Ohio
- WJES in Maysville, Georgia
- WJSR in Lakeside, Virginia
- WJXN in Utica, Mississippi
- WKBB in Mantee, Mississippi
- WKLI in Albany, New York
- WKNL in New London, Connecticut
- WKOY in Princeton, West Virginia
- WKRL in North Syracuse, New York
- WLSK in Lebanon, Kentucky
- WLUN in Pinconning, Michigan
- WLYU in Lyons, Georgia
- WMJK in Clyde, Ohio
- WMXE in South Charleston, West Virginia
- WNEX-FM in Perry, Georgia
- WPGW in Portland, Indiana
- WQFL (FM) in Rockford, Illinois
- WQHN in East Jordan, Michigan
- WQXC in Allegan, Michigan
- WRCO-FM in Richland Center, Wisconsin
- WRNX in Amherst, Massachusetts
- WSTS in Fairmont, North Carolina
- WTGT-LP in Donnellson, Illinois
- WVLY-FM in Milton, Pennsylvania
- WWBR in Big Rapids, Michigan
- WWFY in Berlin, Vermont
- WXIR-LP in Rochester, New York
- WXIZ in Waverly, Ohio
- WXJZ in Gainesville, Florida
- WXND-LP in Louisville, Kentucky
- WYFQ-FM in Indian Trail, North Carolina
- WYNZ in Westbrook, Maine
- WZST in Westover, West Virginia
- WZUS in Macon, Illinois

== Venezuela ==
- La Mega in Puerto la cruz, Anz
