= WMON =

Former simulcast of WJYP St. Albans
- Montgomery, West Virginia; United States
- Broadcast area: Eastern Kanawha County, West Virginia; Western Fayette County, West Virginia
- Frequency: 1340 kHz
- Branding: The Jock

Programming
- Format: Sports
- Affiliations: Fox Sports Radio; Infinity Sports Network; Cincinnati Bengals Radio Network

Ownership
- Owner: WKLC, Inc.
- Sister stations: WJYP, WKLC-FM, WMXE, WSCW, WWQB

History
- First air date: 1946
- Last air date: 2026
- Call sign meaning: Montgomery

Technical information
- Licensing authority: FCC
- Facility ID: 54371
- Class: C
- Power: 1,000 watts unlimited
- Transmitter coordinates: 38°09′56″N 81°18′57″W
- Translator: 98.3 W252DT (Montgomery)

Links
- Public license information: Public file; LMS
- Webcast: Listen Live
- Website: wjypam.com

WMON (1340 AM) was a sports-formatted broadcast radio station licensed to Montgomery, West Virginia, United States, serving eastern Kanawha County, West Virginia and western Fayette County, West Virginia. WMON was owned and operated by WKLC, Inc.

The Federal Communications Commission cancelled the station's license on October 1, 2026.
