= WRVC =

WRVC may refer to:

- WRVC (AM), a radio station (930 AM) licensed to serve Huntington, West Virginia, United States
- WCMI-FM, a radio station (92.7 FM) licensed to serve Catlettsburg, Kentucky, United States, which held the call sign WRVC-FM from 1995 to 2009
- WDGG, a radio station (93.7 FM) licensed to serve Ashland, Kentucky, which held the call sign WRVC-FM from 1988 to 1995
