= WTCR =

WTCR may refer to:

- WTCR-FM, a radio station (103.3 FM) licensed to Huntington, Virginia, United States
- WZWB, a radio station (1420 AM) licensed to Kenova, West Virginia, United States, which held the call sign WTCR from 1955 to 1983 and from 1985 to 2018
- World Touring Car Cup, an international touring car championship result of the adoption of TCR regulations by Eurosport Events following the end of the WTCC
