= 89 FM =

89 FM (ZYC 428)

Aquiraz, Ceará; Brazil
- Broadcast area: Fortaleza, Ceará
- Frequency: 89.9 MHz

Programming
- Language: Portuguese
- Format: Music

Ownership
- Owner: Rádio Capital de Fortaleza Ltda.
- Operator: Grupo Cidade de Comunicação
- Sister stations: Atlântico Sul FM; AM Cidade; Cidade 99; Jovem Pan FM Fortaleza; Jovem Pan News Fortaleza; Vintage FM; TV Cidade Fortaleza

History
- Founded: 1996
- Former names: Capital FM; Rádio Liderança

Technical information
- Licensing authority: ANATEL
- Class: A3
- ERP: 58.4 kW

Links
- Public license information: Profile
- Website: gcmais.com.br/radio/radio89/

89 FM (ZYC 428) is a Brazilian radio station based in Fortaleza, Ceará, and licensed to Aquiraz. It is part of the group of companies called Grupo Cidade de Comunicação, and is a music radio station with a regional format.

== History ==
The 89.9 MHz frequency was launched in Fortaleza by Grupo Cidade de Comunicação in 1996, broadcasting as Capital FM. The station was launched as a popular music radio station, with an emphasis on romantic songs, and its slogan was "A capital do amor" ("The capital of love"). The format lasted for a year, until the station was leased by businessman Emanuel Gurgel, who launched Rede SomZoom Sat on the frequency on June 1, 1997. The new network was launched with announcers brought in from Casablanca FM.

In 2004, the lease to SomZoom Sat was terminated, making way for a new lease, now to Grupo 101, creating a radio network with stations throughout Ceará and the Brazilian Northeast. Rádio Liderança was inaugurated on December 22, 2004. With the reformulation, Rádio Liderança managed, in one year, to leave 12th place and reach 2nd place among the most listened to radio stations in Fortaleza, according to Ibope measurements. The station began to compete with FM 93 and Rádio 100, respectively the audience leader and vice-leader. In 2006, Rádio Liderança de Fortaleza became the network head of Rede Liderança Sat, with the inauguration of stations in the state of Bahia.

On April 28, 2017, the frequency stopped broadcasting Rádio Liderança programming and started playing music selections. From that moment on, the new station was identified as 89 FM. In a clarification note published on May 4, 2017, Rede Liderança de Rádios stated that the signal had been intercepted "without any prior warning or communication" and that they were committed to finding a solution to re-establish the signal. The note also mentions that the affiliation contract had been renewed with Grupo Cidade de Comunicação in 2014 for another 5 years. Grupo Cidade, on the other hand, said that the radio station "did not meet the necessary requirements" to maintain the agreement. From Liderança, Evaldo Costa and Juliana Ferraz returned to the morning slot of the new 89 FM. On June 19, 2017, the radio station started having Luciana Ribeiro in the 8 a.m. to noon time slot.

In May 2018, as part of the new features on Grupo Cidade's radio stations, 89 FM opened up space for programming with a Catholic profile. The new programming includes its own productions and a partnership with Canção Nova to repeat programs from Rádio Canção Nova. The premiere of the new programming took place on May 13, the feast day of Our Lady of Fatima, marked by the broadcast of a mass at the Church of Fatima in Fortaleza. The occasion also marks the birthday of Miguel Dias de Souza, one of the founders of Grupo Cidade and a devotee of Our Lady of Fatima, who was idealizing a radio station with a Catholic segment before his death in March 2018. This programming format remains on the air for only a few months.

== Programs ==
- A Hora do Rei (Evaldo Costa)
- Bom Dia 89 (Evaldo Costa)
- As Mais Pedidas da 89 FM
- A Hora do Mução
- Sucesso 89 (Mayara Lorenna)
- Super Manhã 89 (Luciana Ribeiro)

== Bibliography ==
- Canalito, Jorge; Leme, Paulinho (2007). Rádio FM: Em Fortaleza é outra história. Fortaleza, Ceará: Premius Editora. ISBN 9788590732907.
