= WCMI =

WCMI may refer to:

- WCMI (AM), a radio station (1340 AM) licensed to Ashland, Kentucky, United States
- WCMI-FM, a radio station (92.7 FM) licensed to Catlettsburg, Kentucky, United States
