= KVCB =

KVCB may refer to:

- KVCB-LP, a low-power radio station (100.9 FM) licensed to serve Vacaville, California, United States
- Nut Tree Airport (ICAO code KVCB)
