= Atlântico Sul FM =

Atlântico Sul FM (ZYC 415)

Fortaleza, Ceará; Brazil
- Frequency: 105.7 MHz

Programming
- Language: Portuguese
- Format: Music; Adult contemporary

Ownership
- Owner: Rádio Atlântico Sul Ltda.
- Operator: Grupo Cidade de Comunicação
- Sister stations: 89 FM; AM Cidade; Cidade 99; Jovem Pan FM Fortaleza; Jovem Pan News Fortaleza; Vintage FM; TV Cidade Fortaleza

History
- First air date: January 26, 1989

Technical information
- Licensing authority: ANATEL
- Class: A2
- Power: 96,8 kW

Links
- Public license information: Profile
- Website: gcmais.com.br/radio/atlanticosul/

Atlântico Sul FM (ZYC 415) is a radio station licensed to Fortaleza, Ceará, serving the respective metropolitan area. It is part of the group of companies called Grupo Cidade de Comunicação, and is a music radio station with an adult contemporary format.

== History ==
Founded in 1989 by the Grupo Cidade de Comunicação, Atlântico Sul FM's main focus was the A and B class audience that listened to Casablanca FM, a highlight in Fortaleza's adult contemporary segment, which at that time had switched its focus to young people (CHR) in order to gain a larger audience. To this end, the station's former artistic coordinator, Américo de Souza, was hired. As a result, the radio station adopted a more segmented style, focusing on musical genres that were rarely covered on other commercial radio stations. The station's journalism prioritized economic, fashion, health and current affairs issues, also giving way to the social columnism of print journalism.

In 1999, the station was integrated into the D&E Entretenimento group, as were the radio stations Cidade 99 and the Jovem Pan FM affiliate. This partnership was broken up in 2017, when D&E remained responsible only for artistic management. In January 2018, Grupo Cidade took full control of the station.

== Bibliography ==
- Canalito, Jorge; Leme, Paulinho (2007). Rádio FM: Em Fortaleza é outra história. Fortaleza, Ceará: Premius Editora. ISBN 9788590732907.
