= Rock 105 =

Rock 105 may refer to:

- WOKV-FM, formerly "Rock 105", a radio station in Jacksonville, Florida
- WKLC-FM or "ROCK 105", a radio station in St. Albans, West Virginia
