= WBGS =

WBGS may refer to:

- Watford Grammar School for Boys, Watford, UK
- WBGS-LD, a low-power television station (channel 34) licensed to serve Bowling Green, Kentucky, United States
- WBGS, former callsign for radio station WTHQ (AM), serving Point Pleasant, West Virginia, United States
- WBGS, former callsign for radio station WSLA, serving Slidell, Louisiana, United States
- Sibu Airport, Sarawak in Malaysia, by ICAO code
