= WVHU =

Coordinates: 38°23′35″N 82°28′24″W

- Huntington, West Virginia; United States
- Broadcast area: Huntington, West Virginia
- Frequency: 800 kHz
- Branding: News Radio 800

Programming
- Format: News/talk
- Affiliations: Fox News Radio; Compass Media Networks; Premiere Networks

Ownership
- Owner: iHeartMedia, Inc.; (iHM Licenses, LLC)
- Sister stations: WAMX, WBVB, WKEE-FM, WTCR-FM, WZWB

History
- First air date: July 1947
- Former call signs: WHTN (1947–1959); WKEE (1959–1979); WHTN (1979–1983)
- Call sign meaning: "West Virginia Huntington"

Technical information
- Licensing authority: FCC
- Facility ID: 505
- Class: D
- Power: 5,000 watts day 185 watts night

Links
- Public license information: Public file; LMS
- Webcast: Listen Live
- Website: 800wvhu.iheart.com

WVHU (800 AM) is a news/talk radio station in the Huntington, West Virginia market. Its offerings are similar to other news talk stations owned by iHeartMedia, Inc., as it is the home for Glenn Beck, The Clay Travis and Buck Sexton Show, and Sean Hannity. The station also carries live play-by-play of the Cincinnati Reds.

Previously, rival station WRVC, carried the Reds and Rush Limbaugh, until Clear Channel acquired the station and moved the programming. Previously it was also simulcast on WIRO located to the west, but this station was dropped on April 6, 2009, and WZZW, which was dropped in April 2021.

In recent years the station has led the market in AM radio listenership.

Prior to adapting a news-talk format, WVHU used the call sign WKEE (which is used by an FM station in Huntington) and featured a Top 40 music format. With its daytime signal extending beyond the Tri-State region centered on Huntington-Ashland-Ironton, the former WKEE was the major Top 40 station for Eastern Kentucky, Southern Ohio, and Northern West Virginia. During that era, WKEE used the slogan "The Tri-State's Friendly Giant." Before becoming WKEE, the station was known as WHTN and it was under those call signs that comedian Soupy Sales began his career as a writer and disc jockey.

WHTN began broadcasting in July 1947 as a daytime station on 800 kHz with 1 KW power, licensed to the Greater Huntington Radio Corp.
