= Cidade 99 =

Cidade 99 (ZYC 411)
Fortaleza, Ceará; Brazil
- Frequency: 99.1 MHz

Programming
- Language: Portuguese
- Format: Music; CHR

Ownership
- Owner: TV Cidade de Fortaleza Ltda.
- Operator: Grupo Cidade de Comunicação
- Sister stations: 89 FM; AM Cidade; Atlântico Sul FM; Jovem Pan FM Fortaleza; Jovem Pan News Fortaleza; Vintage FM; TV Cidade Fortaleza

History
- First air date: May 30, 1986

Technical information
- Licensing authority: ANATEL
- Class: A1
- ERP: 51.56 kW

Links
- Public license information: Profile
- Website: gcmais.com.br/radio/cidade99/

Cidade 99 (ZYC 411), also known as Cidade, is a Brazilian radio station licensed to Fortaleza, Ceará, serving the respective metropolitan area. It is part of the group of companies called Grupo Cidade de Comunicação, and is a music radio station with an CHR format.

== History ==
Founded on May 30, 1986, the radio station focuses on CHR audiences, with 80% of its music programming focused on the pop music. The group invested heavily in technology, acquiring a 35 kW transmitter that carried the radio signal to the entire city of Fortaleza and part of the metropolitan area. It also hired important names of the time, such as Dantes Lima, Gleriston Oliveira, Loy Filho and Paulinho Leme. Months after the inauguration, it held its first events at the newly opened shopping center Iguatemi Fortaleza. It also promoted international concerts at the Ginásio Paulo Sarasate, such as those by the bands A-Ha and Information Society.

Between 1989 and 1992, with the great popularization of dances in the periphery promoted by FM do Povo, Cidade also decided to invest in its own dances.The announcer Gleriston Oliveira commanded "Turma do Circuito", which was later called "Circuito Cidade". In 1991, it was sued by Sistema Jornal do Brasil for using the Cidade brand, where it maintained a network CHR/rock radio stations with the same name based in Rio de Janeiro. Grupo Cidade de Comunicação was banned from using the brand, but through an appeal it managed to recover the name, with the exception of using the acronym "FM" before the name "Cidade". As a result, between 1992 and 2001, it shared the Cidade brand with Grupo de Comunicação O Povo, which was affiliated with the Rio de Janeiro network until its end, keeping the brand as an independent radio station.

In March 2017, Cidade FM terminated its lease with Arte Produções and D&E Entretenimento, as part of a process to centralize the operations of Grupo Cidade's radio stations.

== Bibliography ==
- Canalito, Jorge; Leme, Paulinho (2007). Rádio FM: Em Fortaleza é outra história. Fortaleza, Ceará: Premius Editora. ISBN 9788590732907.
