= WBFY =

WBFY may refer to:

- WBFY-LP, a low-power radio station (100.9 FM) licensed to serve Belfast, Maine, United States
- WLXZ, a radio station (90.3 FM) licensed to serve Pinehurst, North Carolina, United States, which held the call sign WBFY from 1998 to 2016
