= Cincinnati Bengals Radio Network =

Official broadcaster of the football team

- Type: Radio network
- Country: United States
- Headquarters: Cincinnati, Ohio
- Broadcast area: Ohio; Kentucky; Indiana (limited); West Virginia (limited)
- Owner: Cincinnati Bengals
- Affiliation: NFL
- Affiliates: 36 (including 3 flagships)
- Official website: Bengals Radio Network

The Cincinnati Bengals Radio Network is an American radio network consisting of 37 radio stations which carry coverage of the Cincinnati Bengals, a professional football team in the NFL. Three Cincinnati radio stations—WCKY (1530 AM), WEBN (102.7 FM), and WLW (700 AM)—serve as the network's flagship stations; WLW also simulcasts over a low-power FM translator. The network also includes 39 affiliates in the U.S. states of Ohio, Kentucky, Indiana, and West Virginia: 27 AM stations, 18 of which extend their signals with one or more low-power FM translators; and 12 full-power FM stations. Dan Hoard is the current play-by-play announcer, while Dave Lapham serves as color commentator. In addition to traditional over-the-air AM and FM broadcasts, the Bengals are available on SiriusXM satellite radio, and online with NFL Audio Pass.

== History ==
Following the 1996 Bengals season, the team ended its radio partnership with Jacor Broadcasting. Jacor had also been responsible for overseeing a network of 35 stations for the team, which had been fronted by WLW (the flagship station from 1968 to 1981 and from 1993 to 1996). Citing a desire to "control content... outside the parameters of gameday broadcasts", the Bengals opted for a new three-year agreement with Chancellor Media. Cincinnati sports talk WKYN and country station WUBE-FM took over as flagship stations for a new network also run by Chancellor. Soon, however, both Chancellor and Jacor would be acquired by Clear Channel, and in 1999, the team itself signed a six-year contract with the radio giant. The team renewed this agreement with Clear Channel in 2005; Cincinnati stations WSAI (which was WCKY (1360 AM) prior to 2005; WSAI's programming and co-flagship rights were transferred to WCKY (1530 AM) in July 2006) and WOFX-FM continued to share flagship duties for the Bengals Radio Network, which by this time included 23 stations in Ohio, Kentucky, and West Virginia. Former network flagship WLW served as a co-flagship station when it did not conflict with game broadcasts over the Cincinnati Reds Radio Network, a practice which continues to the present day. As WLW and WCKY are both 50,000-watt clear-channel stations, their combined footprints allow Bengals night games to be heard across almost all of North America.

Rock station WEBN became the network's new FM flagship in 2008, a change resulting from Clear Channel's sale of WOFX-FM to Cumulus Media (the U. S. Department of Justice had required the sale of WOFX-FM and WNNF to approve a leveraged buyout of Clear Channel itself). The team subsequently renewed its agreement with Clear Channel (now iHeartMedia) again in 2011 and 2014.

== Station list ==
Callsign	Frequency	Band	City	State	Network status
WLW	700	AM	Cincinnati	Ohio	Flagship
W233BG	94.5	FM	Cincinnati	Ohio	WLW relay
WCKY	1530	AM	Cincinnati	Ohio	Flagship
WEBN	102.7	FM	Cincinnati	Ohio	Flagship
WCMI	1340	AM	Ashland	Kentucky	Affiliate
W227CI	93.3	FM	Ashland	Kentucky	WCMI relay
WATH	970	AM	Athens	Ohio	Affiliate
W247DR	97.3	FM	Athens	Ohio	WATH relay
WKXO	1500	AM	Berea	Kentucky	Affiliate
W278CC	103.5	FM	Berea	Kentucky	WATH relay
WDNS	93.3	FM	Bowling Green	Kentucky	Affiliate
WCSM-FM	96.7	FM	Celina	Ohio	Affiliate
WZCB	105.3	FM	Columbus	Ohio	Affiliate
WTUE	104.7	FM	Dayton	Ohio	Affiliate
WBVI	96.7	FM	Findlay	Ohio	Affiliate
WRVC	930	AM	Huntington	West Virginia	Affiliate
W231BS	94.1	FM	Huntington	West Virginia	WRVC relay
WKTN	95.3	FM	Kenton	Ohio	Affiliate
WLOH	1320	AM	Lancaster	Ohio	Affiliate
W283BO	104.3	FM	Lancaster	Ohio	WLOH relay
WBVX	92.1	FM	Lexington	Kentucky	Affiliate
WIMA	1150	AM	Lima	Ohio	Affiliate
WLGN	1510	AM	Logan	Ohio	Affiliate
W257EQ	99.3	FM	Logan	Ohio	WLOH relay
W277CX	103.3	FM	Logan	Ohio	WLGN relay
WKRD	790	AM	Louisville	Kentucky	Affiliate
WWXL	1450	AM	Manchester	Kentucky	Affiliate
WMOA	1490	AM	Marietta	Ohio	Affiliate
W267CQ	101.3	FM	Marietta	Ohio	WMOA relay
WDLR	1270	AM	Marysville	Ohio	Affiliate
W244DV	96.7	FM	Marysville	Ohio	WDLR relay
WTIG	990	AM	Massillon	Ohio	Affiliate
WYRO	98.7	FM	McArthur	Ohio	Affiliate
WMPO	1390	AM	Middleport	Ohio	Affiliate
W279CE	103.7	FM	Middleport	Ohio	WMPO relay
W265DJ	100.9	FM	Mount Vernon	Ohio	WQIO-HD2 relay
WMON	1340	AM	Montgomery	West Virginia	Affiliate
WCLT	1430	AM	Newark	Ohio	Affiliate
W254CT	98.7	FM	Newark	Ohio	WCLT relay
WIOI	1010	AM	New Boston	Ohio	Affiliate
W294CN	106.7	FM	New Boston	Ohio	WIOI relay
WKYH	600	AM	Paintsville	Kentucky	Affiliate
WPTW	1570	AM	Piqua	Ohio	Affiliate
W251BC	98.1	FM	Piqua	Ohio	WPTW relay
WMOV	1360	AM	Ravenswood	West Virginia	Affiliate
W228DJ	93.5	FM	Ravenswood	West Virginia	WMOV relay
W295DM	106.9	FM	Point Pleasant	West Virginia	WMOV relay
WTLO	1480	AM	Somerset	Kentucky	Affiliate
W249DF	97.7	FM	Somerset	Kentucky	WTLO relay
W275CT	102.9	FM	Somerset	Ohio	WLOH relay
WJYP	1300	AM	St. Albans	West Virginia	Affiliate
WCHO-FM	105.5	FM	Washington Court House	Ohio	Affiliate
WHIZ	1240	AM	Zanesville	Ohio	Affiliate
W272EE	102.3	FM	Zanesville	Ohio	WHIZ relay

Blue background indicates low-power FM translator.

=== Network maps ===
Map of network stations in Ohio
Map of network stations in Kentucky

Network stations in West Virginia
