= WKQX (disambiguation) =

WKQX is a Chicago, Illinois, radio station (101.1 FM) that held the call sign WKQX from 1977 to 2011, and again since 2014.

WKQX may also refer to:

- WIQI, a radio station (95.9 FM) licensed to serve Watseka, Illinois, that held the WKQX call sign from 2011 to 2014
- WRME-LD, a low-power analog television station (channel 6) that held the WKQX-LP call sign from 2012 to 2014
- Q101 Chicago, an internet radio platform that existed from 2011 to 2022, when the Q101 branding reverted to terrestrial radio.
