= WBBT =

WBBT may refer to:

- WBBT (AM), a radio station (1340 AM) licensed to Lyons, Georgia, United States
- WBBT-FM, a radio station (107.3 FM) licensed to Powhatan, Virginia, United States
