= Radijas 9 =

Coordinates: 55.698°N 21.147°E

Klaipėda; Lithuania
- Broadcast area: Klaipėda, Lithuania
- Frequency: 91,4 (MHz)
- Branding: "Radijas 9"

Programming
- Format: Music Radio

Ownership
- Owner: Radijas 9

History
- First air date: 29 June 2004

Radijas 9 was a music radio station that was licensed to Klaipėda, Lithuania. The station began broadcasting on 29 June 2004. The radio station is no longer broadcast and has been replaced by XFM, a Christian radio station.

== Programs ==
- Labas rytas, Klaipėda
- Savas Braižas
- Ekomisija
- Svečias Studijoje
- Ant a lot of others
