= KHMV =

KHMV may refer to:

- KHMV-LP, a low-power radio station (100.9 FM) licensed to serve Half Moon Bay, California, United States
- KUGB-CD, a low-power television station (channel 28) licensed to serve Houston, Texas, United States, which held the call sign KHMV-LP or KHMV-CA from 1995 to 2010
