= WKNA =

- Logan, Ohio; United States
- Frequency: 98.3 MHz
- Branding: 98.3 WLGN

Programming
- Format: Classic hits

Ownership
- Owner: WLGN, LLC
- Sister stations: WLGN

History
- First air date: 1965 (as WLGN-FM)
- Former call signs: WLGN-FM (1965–2008)

Technical information
- Licensing authority: FCC
- Facility ID: 38270
- Class: A
- ERP: 6,000 watts
- HAAT: 67 meters
- Transmitter coordinates: 39°31′47.00″N 82°23′10.00″W

Links
- Public license information: Public file; LMS
- Webcast: Listen Live
- Website: 983wlgn.com

WKNA (98.3 FM), formerly WLGN-FM, is a radio station licensed to Logan, Ohio. Like its sister station, WLGN which broadcasts an oldies format, the station is owned by WLGN, LLC.

== History ==
WLGN-FM signed on the air in 1965 and was licensed on February 10, 1966.

On September 11, 2008, WLGN-FM became WKNA. In 2011, the station flipped from country to variety hits, branded as "98.3 Sam FM".

In March 2024, the station reverted to the WLGN branding as "98.3 WLGN — The Valley's Classic Hits"; the call sign remained WKNA.
