= WIQI (disambiguation) =

WIQI is a radio station in Watseka, Illinois.

WIQI may also refer to:

- WMTX, formerly WIQI, a Tampa, Florida, radio station
- WKQX (FM), formerly WIQI, a Chicago radio station
