= WDGG =

- Ashland, Kentucky; United States
- Broadcast area: Huntington, West Virginia
- Frequency: 93.7 MHz
- Branding: 93-7 The Dawg

Programming
- Format: Country music
- Affiliations: Premiere Networks; Westwood One; Marshall Thundering Herd

Ownership
- Owner: Kindred Communications; (Fifth Avenue Broadcasting Company, Inc.)
- Sister stations: WCMI, WCMI-FM, WMGA, WRVC, WXBW

History
- First air date: October 1948; 77 years ago
- Former call signs: WCMI-FM (1948-1970); WAMX-FM (1970-1988); WRVC-FM (1988-1995)
- Call sign meaning: "Dawg"

Technical information
- Licensing authority: FCC
- Facility ID: 21436
- Class: C1
- ERP: 100,000 watts
- HAAT: 226 meters
- Transmitter coordinates: 38°23′14″N 82°39′45″W

Links
- Public license information: Public file; LMS
- Webcast: Listen live
- Website: 937thedawg.com

WDGG (93.7 FM) is a country music–formatted radio station licensed to Ashland, Kentucky, serving Huntington, West Virginia, and the greater Huntington–Ashland metropolitan area. The station is owned by Kindred Communications. WDGG's studios are located on Fifth Avenue in downtown Huntington, while its transmitter facilities are in Catlettsburg, KY. A Kentucky transmitter location was chosen because FCC FM allocations only allow for a 50,000 watt maximum power if the transmitter was located in West Virginia.

In addition to its country music format, WDGG serves as the flagship station for the Marshall Thundering Herd.

== History ==
The station signed on the air in October 1948 as WCMI-FM in Ashland as a simulcast of its AM sister station WCMI's broadcast schedule. The call letters were said to refer to the steel industry of Ashland as "Where Coal Meets Iron".

On November 20, 1970, the call letters were changed to WAMX-FM and ownership was transferred to W. Richard Martin and Stereo 94, Inc. The station broadcast with an adult contemporary music format and experimented with an album oriented rock format at night during the early 1970s.

In the mid-1970s, WAMX-FM (also known as 94X) adopted a contemporary hit radio (CHR) format until its sale to Storer broadcasting in 1983. With the sale, the studios moved to nearby Huntington. Despite competing against WKEE-FM, WAMX retained its CHR format until 1986 when the station adopted an album oriented rock format (AOR), leaving WKEE the only CHR station in the market.

On April 30, 1988, the call letters representing the River Cities were adopted and the license became known as WRVC-FM. The station also flipped to adult contemporary at the same time. The dormant WAMX call sign was adopted by an unrelated station (at 106.3 MHz) in the Huntington market on January 6, 1997.

In the fall of 1992, WRVC dropped the AC format and flipped to oldies (mostly concentrating on the 60s), and changed the branding to "Oldies 93 RVC".

The WDGG call letters were granted by the FCC on February 6, 1995. At that time, the WRVC call sign and oldies format were moved to 92.7 WCMI-FM, which continued the simulcast with WRVZ in Charleston.
