= WMPO =

- Middleport, Ohio; United States
- Broadcast area: Pomeroy, Ohio
- Frequency: 1390 kHz
- Branding: Fox Sports

Programming
- Format: Sports talk
- Affiliations: Fox Sports Radio

Ownership
- Owner: Total Media Group
- Sister stations: WTHQ, WBYG, WYVK

History
- First air date: 1959
- Call sign meaning: W Middleport & PomeroyOhio

Technical information
- Licensing authority: FCC
- Facility ID: 18021
- Class: D
- Power: 5,000 watts day 120 watts night
- Transmitter coordinates: 39°0′37.00″N 82°3′58.00″W
- Translators: 99.9 W260DF (Athens); 103.7 W279CE (Middleport)

Links
- Public license information: Public file; LMS

WMPO (1390 AM) is a radio station broadcasting a sports talk format. Licensed to Middleport-Pomeroy, USA, the station is currently owned by Total Media Group. Joe Hill of Tucson AZ, began his radio career in 1977 at WMPO, under the air name "David Barnes" before moving on to WWJM Zanesville in 1978, finally finishing his career in broadcasting as director of operations with FLR Tucson, AZ in 2009.

== WMPO history ==
(Written By John E.M. Kerr) In May 1957, a group of Athens businessmen met to discuss starting a radio station located in Meigs County. Present at the meeting included Roger Jones, attorney; Roy Stephenson, accountant; Frank Rauch, bakery & theater owner; A.H. Kovlan, WATH Radio owner; and John E.M. Kerr, advertising manager for WATH. The group elected to form a corporation called Radio Mid-Pom, Inc. and applied for a broadcast license with the FCC for Meigs County. A search immediately followed to find a building and tower site in Meigs County.

The group learned that the Bailey family in Bradbury was thinking of closing their restaurant. Radio Mid-Pom elected to purchase Bailey's Drive In and lease adjacent acreage for the tower. On August 28, 1959, WMPO 1390 started broadcasting with a staff of five people. An open house was held with both Pomeroy and Middleport mayors giving welcome speeches.

In 1964, WMPO was granted permission to increase power to 5,000 Watts making it one of the strongest stations in the area. The years progressed well and in 1973, WMPO 1390 was granted permission for an FM station to broadcast on 92.1 with 3,000 Watts and a new wing was added to the station building. Ground was leased from Robert Burdett for the new tower. Throughout the period and expansion, two of the stockholders died and their stock was purchased by Jack Kerr and Frank Rauch.

After 30 years of successful operation, the two remaining stockholders elected to sell the stations. E.T. Broadcasting of Dayton purchased WMPO in 1989. Ten years later, the station was sold to Positive Radio Group of Blacksburg, Virginia.

In 2023, the station was purchased by Total Media Group Inc. In August 2024, the station returned to its former Fox Sports Radio format. Prior to the switch, WMPO was carrying a Top 40 format.

The station is the longtime home of Meigs Mauraders football during the fall season.
