= WBVB =

- Coal Grove, Ohio; United States
- Broadcast area: Huntington-Ashland
- Frequency: 97.1 MHz
- Branding: B97

Programming
- Format: Classic hits
- Affiliations: Premiere Networks

Ownership
- Owner: iHeartMedia, Inc.; (iHM Licenses, LLC)
- Sister stations: WAMX, WKEE-FM, WTCR-FM, WVHU, WZWB

History
- First air date: 1990 (as WXVK)
- Former call signs: WZTX (1988–1989, CP); WXVK (1989–1994)

Technical information
- Licensing authority: FCC
- Facility ID: 507
- Class: A
- ERP: 3,000 watts
- HAAT: 144 meters (472 ft)
- Transmitter coordinates: 38°25′27.00″N 82°32′4.00″W

Links
- Public license information: Public file; LMS
- Webcast: Listen Live
- Website: b97fm.iheart.com

WBVB (97.1 FM, "B97") is a radio station broadcasting a classic hits radio format. Licensed to Coal Grove, Ohio, United States, the station serves the Huntington-Ashland area. The station is currently owned by iHeartMedia, Inc.

== History ==
The station was assigned call sign WZTX on August 18, 1988. On November 29, 1989, the station changed its call sign to WXVK, and then on December 19, 1994, to the current WBVB.

On February 14, 2012, WBVB relaunched as "Oldies 97.1".

On January 1, 2016, WBVB shifted its format from oldies to classic hits, branded as "B97".

In January 2020, the hosts of WBVB's morning show, the Woody & Professor Show, were laid off as a part of iHeartMedia's realignment in small and medium radio markets.
