= WMGA =

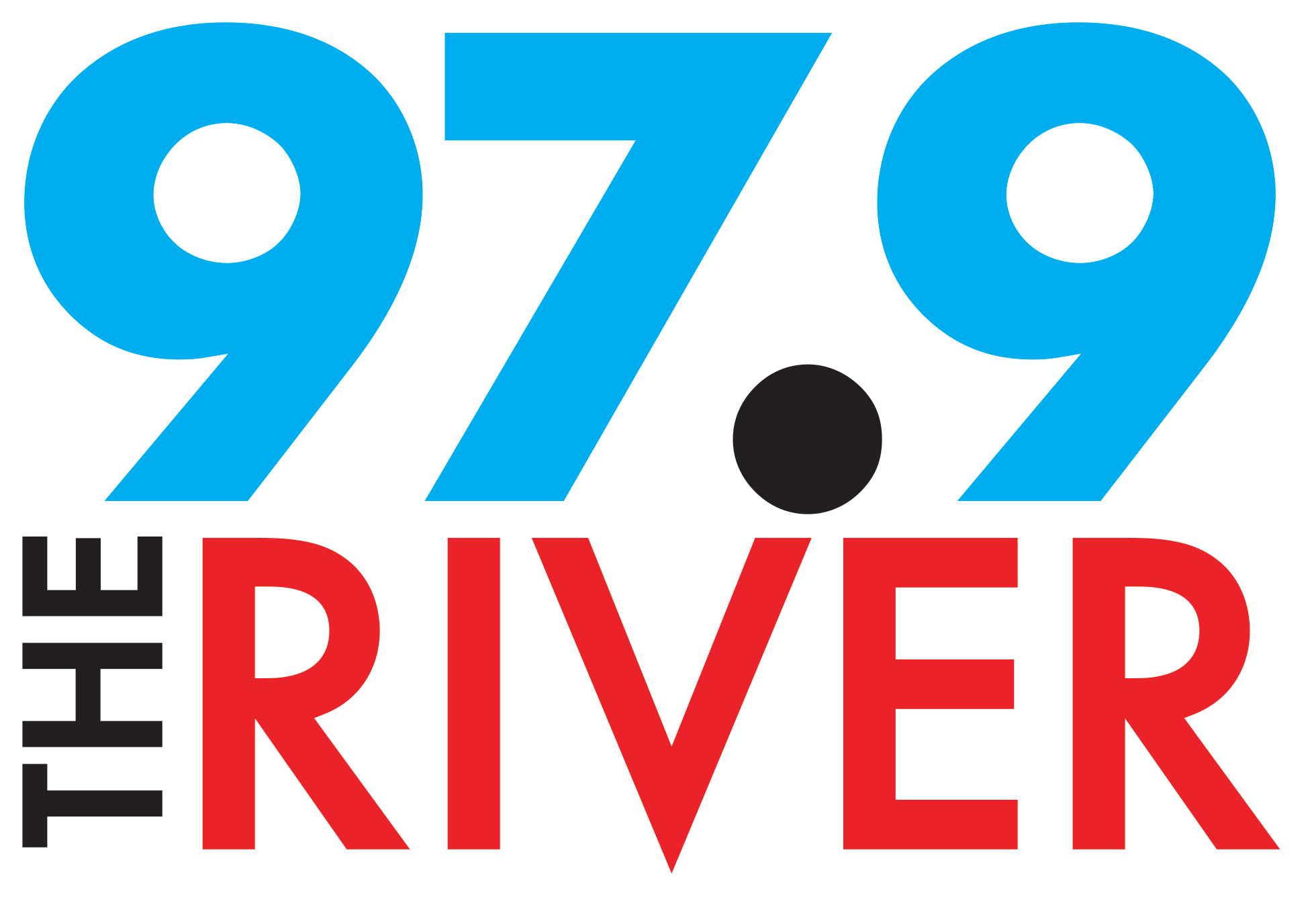
- Kenova, West Virginia; United States
- Broadcast area: Huntington, West Virginia; Ironton, Ohio; Ashland, Kentucky
- Frequency: 97.9 MHz
- Branding: 97.9 The River

Programming
- Format: Classic hits; Oldies
- Affiliations: Westwood One

Ownership
- Owner: Fifth Avenue Broadcasting Company, Inc. (dba Kindred Communications)
- Sister stations: WXBW, WDGG, WRVC, WCMI, WCMI-FM

History
- First air date: 2006
- Call sign meaning: "Magic" (previous format)

Technical information
- Licensing authority: FCC
- Facility ID: 164110
- Class: A
- ERP: 3,500 watts
- HAAT: 133 meters
- Transmitter coordinates: 38°25′26.0″N 82°32′8.0″W

Links
- Public license information: Public file; LMS
- Webcast: Listen Live
- Website: 979theriver.com

WMGA (97.9 FM, "The River") is a classic hits and oldies formatted broadcast radio station licensed to Kenova, West Virginia, serving Huntington, West Virginia, Ironton, Ohio, and Ashland, Kentucky. WMGA is licensed to Fifth Avenue Broadcasting Company, Inc.

== History ==
On July 26, 2012, WMGA changed its format from soft AC (as "Magic 97.9") to hot AC, branded as "Hits 97.9". In May 2017, WMGA changed its format to 1980s music, retaining the "Hits" branding. On February 26, 2018, WMGA changed its format from 1980s hits to adult contemporary, branded as "97.9 The River".

On October 19, 2023, 97.9 the River was the very first radio station in the United States to flip to all Christmas music for the 2023 holiday season. No media outlets had noticed WMGA's change until October 31, when WMXL in Lexington, Kentucky, was thought to have been the first for that year (which would have been, in reversal of the Christmas creep trend, the latest such first overall flip in over a decade); Radio Insight, which tracks such format flips, later added an addendum to that report that "we have been told" WMGA had been doing so since October 19. Inside Radio, which also identified WMXL as first, stated that WMGA had "slipp(ed) under the radar."

Following the Christmas music stint, on December 26, 2023, the station, still under the "River" branding, shifted to an oldies format focused primarily on 1960s and 1970s music. The format shift was deemed a "very personal" project for Kindred president/CEO Mike Kirtner, who had grown up in the Huntington area and claimed said music was deemed a "forgotten generation" by most radio outlets in the area.
