= WHPO =

- Hoopeston, Illinois; United States
- Broadcast area: Danville / Central Illiana
- Frequency: 100.9 MHz
- Branding: 101 Country

Programming
- Format: Country

Ownership
- Owner: Smash Hit Radio; (Hoopeston Radio, Inc.)
- Sister stations: WIQI

Technical information
- Licensing authority: FCC
- Facility ID: 27614
- Class: A
- ERP: 3,000 watts
- HAAT: 91.0 meters (298.6 ft)
- Transmitter coordinates: 40°28′36.00″N 87°41′36.00″W

Links
- Public license information: Public file; LMS
- Website: Official website

WHPO (100.9 FM) is a radio station broadcasting a country music format. Licensed to Hoopeston, Illinois, United States, the station serves Iroquois County, Vermillion County, and Ford County, Illinois as well as Benton County, and Warren County, Indiana. WHPO is currently owned by Hoopeston Radio Inc.
