= XHSA-FM =

Radio station in Saltillo, Coahuila

- Saltillo, Coahuila; Mexico
- Broadcast area: Saltillo
- Frequency: 100.9 MHz
- Branding: La Reina

Programming
- Format: Grupera

Ownership
- Owner: Voler, S.A. de C.V.

History
- First air date: May 31, 1990 (concession)
- Call sign meaning: SAltillo

Technical information
- Licensing authority: CRT
- Class: B1
- ERP: 9.72 kW
- HAAT: −113.5 m (−372 ft)

Links
- Website: www.lareinafm.com.mx

XHSA-FM is a radio station on 100.9 FM in Saltillo, Coahuila. The station carries a grupera format known as La Reina.

== History ==
XHSA received its concession on May 31, 1990. It was owned by Radio Signo, S.A., a subsidiary of Radiorama.
