= WBYG =

- Point Pleasant, West Virginia; United States
- Broadcast area: Point Pleasant, West Virginia; Mason County, West Virginia; Gallia County, Ohio
- Frequency: 99.5 MHz
- Branding: Pure Rock 99.5

Programming
- Format: Mainstream rock
- Affiliations: ABC News Radio

Ownership
- Owner: Total Media Group
- Sister stations: WTHQ, WYVK, WMPO

History
- First air date: 1995
- Call sign meaning: play on the word "big" (previous branding and format)

Technical information
- Licensing authority: FCC
- Facility ID: 5283
- Class: A
- ERP: 4,700 watts
- HAAT: 100 meters
- Transmitter coordinates: 38°50′49.0″N 82°7′50.0″W

Links
- Public license information: Public file; LMS

WBYG (99.5 FM) is a mainstream rock formatted broadcast radio station licensed to Point Pleasant, West Virginia, serving Point Pleasant, Mason County in West Virginia and Gallia County in Ohio. WBYG is owned and operated by Total Media Group.

The call letters were formerly held by an AM radio station at 1450 kHz in Savannah, Georgia (now silent).

On June 21, 2024, WBYG changed their format from country to mainstream rock, branded as "Pure Rock 99.5".
