= WXBW =

Radio station in Gallipolis, Ohio, United States

Coordinates: 38.805°N 82.227°W

- Gallipolis, Ohio; United States
- Broadcast area: Huntington, West Virginia
- Frequency: 101.5 MHz
- Branding: Big Buck Country 101.5

Programming
- Format: Classic country
- Affiliations: Motor Racing Network (NASCAR), Performance Racing Network (NASCAR)

Ownership
- Owner: Fifth Avenue Broadcasting Company, Inc. (dba Kindred Communications)
- Sister stations: WCMI, WCMI-FM, WDGG, WMGA, WRVC

Technical information
- Licensing authority: FCC
- Facility ID: 70691
- Class: B
- ERP: 50,000 watts
- HAAT: 150 meters
- Repeater: 101.5 WXBW-FM1 (Huntington)

Links
- Public license information: Public file; LMS
- Webcast: Listen Live
- Website: bigbuck1015.com

WXBW (101.5 FM) is a radio station located in Gallipolis, Ohio. The station has an additional booster station, WXBW-FM1 located in Huntington, West Virginia. The stations are licensed to Fifth Avenue Broadcasting Company, Inc. Previously a classic rock radio station, then-owner Connoisseur Media flipped 101.5 The River (WRYV) to variety hits as 101.5 Bob FM at approximately 10:00 p.m. on August 26, 2008. At this time, the station became known as WXBW. This became the 4th market in which Connoisseur is using the Bob FM presentation. On March 28, 2011, 101.5 flipped again, this time to classic country as Big Buck Country 101.5. The Big Buck Country branding has also been on the now-WRXS in Milwaukee, Wisconsin.
