= XHPALV-FM =

Radio station in Alto Lucero–Xalapa, Veracruz, Mexico

XHALAPA-FM
- Alto Lucero–Xalapa, Veracruz; Mexico
- Frequency: 100.9 FM
- Branding: La Lupe

Programming
- Format: Variety hits

Ownership
- Owner: Multimedios Radio; (Multimedios Radio, S.A. de C.V.)

History
- First air date: 2018
- Call sign meaning: Alto Lucero, Veracruz

Technical information
- Licensing authority: CRT
- Class: A
- ERP: 3,000 watts
- HAAT: 220.8 meters
- Transmitter coordinates: 19°32′53.82″N 96°55′14.94″W

Links
- Webcast: Listen live
- Website: mmradio.com

XHALAPA-FM is a radio station on 100.9 FM in Alto Lucero and Xalapa, Veracruz, Mexico. It is owned by Multimedios Radio and carries its La Lupe variety hits format.

== History ==
Multimedios won XHPALV in the IFT-4 radio auction of 2017 at a cost of 46,000 pesos. The station signed on in the summer of 2018.

All three Multimedios stations in Veracruz flipped from La Caliente to La Lupe on November 6, 2020.

== Transmitters ==
XHPALV-FM signed on with one transmitter at Alto Lucero. A second transmitter was activated in late 2019 at Cerro Macuiltepetl in Xalapa and is now considered the primary.

Rebroadcasters of XHALAPA-FM
City of licence	Identifier	Frequency	Power
Xalapa	XHALAPA-FM	100.9 MHz	3,000 watts
Alto Lucero	XHALAPA-FM	100.9 MHz	750 watts
