= WTIG =

Coordinates: 40°49′57″N 81°33′39″W

- Massillon, Ohio; United States
- Broadcast area: Massillon, Ohio
- Frequency: 990 kHz
- Branding: ESPN Radio 990

Programming
- Format: Sports
- Affiliations: ESPN Radio; Cincinnati Bengals Radio Network; Cincinnati Reds Radio Network; Columbus Blue Jackets Radio Network

Ownership
- Owner: Raymond Jeske; (WTIG, Inc.)

History
- First air date: 1957
- Call sign meaning: Massillon TIGers

Technical information
- Licensing authority: FCC
- Facility ID: 15282
- Class: D
- Power: 250 watts (daytime); 112 watts (nighttime)

Links
- Public license information: Public file; LMS
- Webcast: Listen Live
- Website: espn990.com

WTIG is an AM radio station in Massillon, Ohio operating on 990 kHz and featuring sports talk programming from ESPN Radio. The station is an affiliate of the Cincinnati Reds, Cincinnati Bengals, and the Columbus Blue Jackets radio networks.

== History ==
WTIG was granted its license from the FCC in 1957. The original studios were located on the second floor of a building just a half block south of the town square, which later suffered a fire. The studios were immediately moved to the Massillon Motel, located on Lincoln Way East in downtown Massillon.(then route 30). Due to space limitations the studios were then moved to occupy a portion of the 2nd floor of the Massillon Building on the square (intersection of N. Erie St. and Lincoln Way, now Route 172) in downtown Massillon. In the mid-1990s the station ownership eventually moved the studios to the station's transmitter facilities on Karen Avenue NW as a cost-saving measure.

In its heyday, WTIG was a Top 40 station as "Tiger Radio," and was still playing blocks of music well into the 1990s. Because of its FCC Class D status and lower power and directional pattern south (to protect a Canadian licensee of the same frequency) WTIG does not cover areas north but concentrates on the Canton-Massillon area and surrounding townships. The programming for the past 20 years has been Sports, and affiliation with ESPN using the promotional name "ESPN 990." In addition to local sports, they carry Cincinnati Bengals football and Cincinnati Reds baseball.
