= AM Cidade =

AM Cidade (ZYH 592)
Maracanaú, Ceará; Brazil
- Broadcast area: Fortaleza, Ceará
- Frequency: 860 kHz

Programming
- Language: Portuguese
- Format: Full-service; Sports

Ownership
- Owner: AM Cidade de Fortaleza Ltda.
- Operator: Grupo Cidade de Comunicação
- Sister stations: 89 FM; Atlântico Sul FM; Cidade 99; Jovem Pan FM Fortaleza; Jovem Pan News Fortaleza; Vintage FM; TV Cidade Fortaleza

History
- Founded: 1959
- First air date: June 10, 1982
- Former call signs: ZYH 33
- Former names: Rádio Iracema de Maranguape

Technical information
- Licensing authority: ANATEL
- Class: B
- Power: 25 kW

Links
- Public license information: Profile
- Website: gcmais.com.br/radio/cidadeam860/

AM Cidade (ZYH 592), also called Cidade AM, is a Brazilian radio station based in Fortaleza, Ceará, and licensed to Maracanaú. It is part of the group of companies called Grupo Cidade de Comunicação, and has a generalist programming format, alternating between news, service, political and soccer programs. The station was founded in 1959 as Rádio Iracema de Maranguape and acquired by businessman Patriolino Ribeiro. It was reopened in 1982 with its current identity.

== History ==
Rádio Iracema was inaugurated in Fortaleza on October 9, 1948, through a partnership between José Barreto Parente, Flavio Barreto Parente, José Josino da Costa - representing Walter de Sá Cavalcante, then director of the newspaper O Estado - and 22 other personalities. José Pessoa de Araújo joined the station in 1952, replacing José Josino da Costa. Before that, in 1951, Iracema began a process of expansion across the state by launching several affiliated stations, which made up the Rede Iracemista de Rádios.

On the initiative of Alfredo Marques, together with José Pessoa de Araújo, Rádio Iracema de Maranguape was inaugurated on August 15, 1959, on the frequency 1580 kHz. The land had been purchased in the municipality that bears its name in January 1957 and the station was authorized to operate on a trial basis in February 1959. The inauguration event was attended by a number of personalities from Maranguape and Fortaleza. The station's first voice was that of Orlys Vasconcelos, a famous broadcaster from Fortaleza, who opened the broadcasts with a "Bom dia Maranguape" ("Good morning, Maranguape") on the morning of the inauguration. The station's programming included musical attractions and chronicles about the city. However, Rádio Iracema de Maranguape, like the others on the network, didn't work out as desired.

With the growth of Fortaleza and its proximity to Maranguape, José Pessoa de Araújo lost interest in keeping the station in the municipality and sold it to businessman Patriolino Ribeiro, who was his partner in the then TV Uirapuru. The radio station was deactivated in 1978 and reactivated four years later, after gaining new authorization to operate the station in Fortaleza. With the emancipation of the district of Maracanaú, the operating license was assigned to this municipality. AM Cidade was inaugurated on June 10, 1982, on the frequency 860 kHz, under the command of Miguel Dias de Souza, Patriolino's son. Since then, it has followed a popular line, with news, sports and political programs, as well as space for trade unions. At first, it relayed programming from Rádio Bandeirantes in São Paulo. It was later leased to the Canal Forró group, which managed forró bands, for a period in the 2000s.

Until 2017, the management of AM Cidade was the responsibility of Nelson Oliveira, who also led the station's sports team. In July 2017, it was announced that the station's sports team had been abolished due to the return of the station's management to Grupo Cidade. An agreement allowed the team to continue at the station. On August 12, 2017, journalist Jota Egito took over the sports team. On April 22, 2018, it was announced that Jota Egito's sports team had left the station due to late payment of the time slot lease. In June of the same year, the station began broadcasting soccer matches in a chain with the recently opened Jovem Pan News Fortaleza, also part of Grupo Cidade. Gomes Farias, who was in charge of the sports team at the new station, also started narrating matches on AM Cidade and presenting a program in the late afternoon.

In September 2023, AM Cidade replaced its music tracks with reruns of programs from Jovem Pan News Fortaleza, with the aim of introducing all-news programming until it completes its migration to FM radio.
