= WZWB =

Coordinates: 38°24′42″N 82°36′13″W

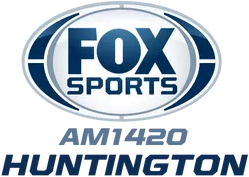
- Kenova, West Virginia; United States
- Broadcast area: Huntington, West Virginia
- Frequency: 1420 kHz
- Branding: Fox Sports 1420

Programming
- Format: Sports
- Affiliations: Fox Sports Radio; Ohio State Sports Network; Columbus Blue Jackets Radio Network

Ownership
- Owner: iHeartMedia, Inc.; (iHM Licenses, LLC)
- Sister stations: WAMX, WBVB, WKEE-FM, WTCR-FM, WVHU

History
- First air date: August 1954 (as WWKO)
- Former call signs: WWKO (1954–1955); WTCR (1955–1983); WHEZ (1983–1985); WTCR (1985–2018)

Technical information
- Licensing authority: FCC
- Facility ID: 14377
- Class: B
- Power: 5,000 watts (day); 500 watts (night)

Links
- Public license information: Public file; LMS
- Webcast: Listen Live
- Website: foxsports1420.iheart.com

WZWB (1420 AM) is a radio station broadcasting a sports format, licensed to Kenova, West Virginia and serving the Huntington market as the area's affiliate of Fox Sports Radio.

Until 2022, for all programming other than local sporting events, it was a simulcast of WIRO in nearby Ironton, Ohio. Prior to its current format, the station broadcast a Christian religious format known as Joy Radio and was, until January 2007, simulcast with WZZW of Milton, West Virginia.
