= WIOI =

- New Boston, Ohio; United States
- Frequency: 1010 kHz
- Branding: True Oldies

Programming
- Format: Oldies
- Affiliations: Fox News Radio; Cincinnati Bengals Radio Network; Music of Your Life

Ownership
- Owner: Total Media Group Inc.

History
- First air date: September 2, 1959
- Call sign meaning: Visual resemblance to 101

Technical information
- Licensing authority: FCC
- Facility ID: 60035
- Class: D
- Power: 1,000 watts (day); 22 watts ((night)
- Transmitter coordinates: 38°43′48.00″N 82°57′10.00″W
- Translator: 92.1 W221EW (New Boston)

Links
- Public license information: Public file; LMS
- Webcast: Listen Live
- Website: yourtotalmedia.com/wioi

WIOI (1010 AM) is a radio station broadcasting an oldies format. It is licensed to New Boston, Ohio, United States. The station is currently owned by Total Media Group Inc. and features programming from Music of Your Life.

== History ==
WIOI is best known for being the Top 40 station in Portsmouth during the 1960s and 1970s, when Chuck Maillet was the owner. It changed hands a few times until 1996, when Chip Maillet, owner of Maillet Media, bought the station back from its previous owner. At this point it had an all talk radio format. In December 2000 the format was changed to "Music of Your Life". The community responded positively, especially those over age 50.

Former logo

In early 2008, Music of Your Life was acquired by entrepreneur Marc Angell. WIOI continued airing the format, which is now distributed by Music of Your Life, Inc., a public company listed on the Over the Counter stock market under the ticker symbol MYLI.

In August 2025, Chip Maillet announced his retirement from the radio industry, and sold WIOI to Jackson, Ohio based Total Media Group Inc.

== Personalities ==
Chip Maillet, a radio veteran since he started broadcasting at the age of 14 in 1970, announced the morning local news, weather, and community events. He was also the station owner and manager and handles sales. He was the "world's oldest DJ" (station joke). A 60-year veteran of radio from news for Mutual Broadcasting to major market morning man, Chuck did it all, including radio station manager, president and past owner. He died January 24, 2010, at the age of 89.

A long line of WIOI "jocks" and newsfolk went on to larger markets and some fame in communications. Among them was Phil Phillips, aka Phil Nye, who went on to become ABC Television News Vice President in Charge of O & O news operations, as well as News Director at four of ABC's five O & O stations (WABC, WXYZ, KGO, and KABC). Phil Hayes has been a news director at television stations in many cities including Detroit and Erie, Pennsylvania. Al Volker went on to produce, executive produce and news direct for 51 years. Dave Craig took his D.C. morning radio program on the road in many cities after his stint at WIOI.

== Other programming ==
WIOI is also the local affiliate for the Cincinnati Bengals, and has live Sunday church programming from 7:45am to 11:30am.
