= XHI-FM =

Radio station in Morelia, Michoacán

- Morelia, Michoacán, Mexico; Mexico
- Frequency: 100.9 MHz (HD Radio)
- Branding: Máxima

Programming
- Format: Pop

Ownership
- Owner: Radio S.A.; (Carlos de Jesús Quiñones Armendáriz)

History
- Former frequencies: 1400 kHz

Technical information
- ERP: 10 kW
- Transmitter coordinates: 19°43′22.38″N 101°10′21.43″W

Links
- Webcast: Listen live
- Website: maxima.com.mx

XHI-FM is a radio station in Morelia, Michoacán broadcasting on 100.9 MHz.

XHI-FM broadcasts in HD.

== History ==
XEI-AM came to air in September 1932. It was owned by Tiburcio Ponce Gutiérrez. In January 1981, it was sold to Carlos Quiñones, founder and owner of Radio S.A.

Previous logo

The station migrated to FM on August 7, 2011.
