= WYVK =

- Middleport, Ohio; United States
- Broadcast area: Pomeroy, Ohio
- Frequency: 92.1 MHz
- Branding: 92.1 HANK FM

Programming
- Format: Adult contemporary
- Affiliations: ABC Radio; Ohio State Sports Network

Ownership
- Owner: Total Media Group
- Sister stations: WTHQ, WMPO, WBYG

History
- First air date: 1973
- Former call signs: WMPO-FM (1979–1999)

Technical information
- Licensing authority: FCC
- Facility ID: 18022
- Class: A
- ERP: 4,700 watts
- HAAT: 111 meters
- Transmitter coordinates: 39°3′30.00″N 82°2′31.00″W

Links
- Public license information: Public file; LMS
- Website: wyvk.com

WYVK (92.1 FM) is a radio station broadcasting an adult contemporary format. Licensed to Middleport, Ohio, United States, the station is currently owned by Total Media Group and features programming from ABC Radio.

== History ==
The station went on the air as WMPO-FM on 1973-05-31. On 1999-08-02, the station changed its call sign to the current WYVK.

In 2023, the station (and its sister stations) were purchased by Total Media Group.

In September 2024, WYVK changed their format from classic hits to adult contemporary, still branded as "K92.1".

In 2025, WYVK changed formats again. This time, changing from adult contemporary to classic country. The K92 branding was also dropped, and the station was repackaged as "92.1 HANK FM". Accompanying the switch was longtime tri-state broadcaster JB Miller, who became morning show host. Miller's morning show is simulcasted on other Total Media Group owned HANK FM stations across the region.

WYVK also broadcasts Meigs County area high school sports for all three high schools in the county. The station carries a "game of the week" rotation for football and basketball. Sports coverage sometimes extends to Wahama White Falcons football and basketball, located in Mason, West Virginia.
