= TV Cidade (Fortaleza) =

Coordinates: 3°44′53″S 38°30′6″W

TV Cidade (ZYP 267)
- Fortaleza, Ceará; Brazil
- Channels: Digital: 32 (UHF); Virtual: 8

Programming
- Affiliations: Record

Ownership
- Owner: Grupo Cidade; (TV Cidade de Fortaleza Ltda.)
- Sister stations: 89 FM; AM Cidade; Atlântico Sul FM; Cidade 99; Jovem Pan FM Fortaleza; Jovem Pan News Fortaleza; Vintage FM

History
- Founded: August 30, 1978
- Former call signs: ZYA 427 (1978-2017)
- Former names: TV Uirapuru (1978-1981)
- Former channel numbers: Analog: 8 (VHF, 1978-2017)
- Former affiliations: Rede Bandeirantes (1981–1987); SBT (1982–1998)

Technical information
- Licensing authority: ANATEL

Links
- Public license information: Profile
- Website: https://gcmais.com.br/

TV Cidade (channel 8) is a television station in Fortaleza, Ceará, Brazil, serving as an affiliate of the Record television network for the entire state, owned by locally based Grupo Cidade de Comunicação as its sole television broadcasting property.

== History ==
On August 30, 1978, TV Cidade first went on the air as TV Uirapuru, which broadcast on channel 8. In December the same year, businessman Miguel Dias de Sousa acquired 50% of the station, purchasing the rest in March 1979.

TV Uirapuru changed its name to TV Cidade de Fortaleza in June 1981. The station was affiliated with Rede Bandeirantes, with all programming originating from São Paulo.

In 1982, the station also began broadcasting TVS' programs. From Monday to Saturday, Rede Bandeirantes programming was scheduled, with Sunday being reserved for the Programa Sílvio Santos (Silvio Santos Show).

In 1987, the station replaced its Rede Bandeirantes affiliation with that of SBT; during this period, the station was known for producing police programs, leading to high ratings within Ceará.

The station's chairman, Miguel Dias, announced in 1998 that TV Cidade would become an affiliate of Rede Record, which was expanding its coverage to all of Brazil at the time.

== Programs ==
In addition to relaying Record's national programming, TV Cidade also shows the following programs:

- Balanço Geral CE Manhã: current affairs, with Miguel Anderson Costa and Luciana Ribeiro;
- Cidade 190: true crime, with Evaldo Costa and Márcio Lopes;
- Balanço Geral CE: current affairs, with Luiz Esteves and Mayara Lorenna;
- Cidade Alerta Ceará: true crime, with Ísis Cidade and Ronaldo Martins;
- Jornal da Cidade: newscast, with Bianca Saraiva and Alexandre Monteiro;
- Corpo e Estilo de Vida: variety, with Cleane and José Fontenele;
- Atualiza Aí: reality, with Fernanda Levy;
- Viver Pela Fé: religious, with Ana Clara Rocha;
- Fabricando empreendedores
