= WXTQ =

- Athens, Ohio; United States
- Frequency: 105.5 MHz
- Branding: Pure Rock 105 XTQ

Programming
- Format: Classic rock

Ownership
- Owner: Alan Stockmeister; (Total Media Group)
- Sister stations: WATH

History
- First air date: September 16, 1964
- Former call signs: WATH-FM (1964–1975)

Technical information
- Licensing authority: FCC
- Facility ID: 71097
- Class: A
- ERP: 6,000 watts
- HAAT: 95.0 meters (311.7 ft)
- Transmitter coordinates: 39°21′18.00″N 82°5′32.00″W

Links
- Public license information: Public file; LMS
- Webcast: Listen live
- Website: WXTQ Online

WXTQ (105.5 FM) is a radio station broadcasting a classic rock format. Licensed to serve Athens, Ohio, United States, the station is owned by Alan Stockmeister, through licensee Total Media Group

== History ==
WXYQ during its early heyday started life as "Rock 105", and originally ran a mix of Top 40 and AOR. The station would later add programming from NBC's The Source network in its lineup. By the mid-1980s, the station dropped its rock formula and branding when the station fully transitioned to CHR. In 1994, the station downgraded its CHR format and flipped to a hot adult contemporary format as "Power 105.5".

This lasted until May 25, 2023, the station dropped its "Power" format and began stunting with loops of various songs from different genres (ranging from classic hits to Top 40 to country to rock). The next morning at 8:30 a.m., the station flipped to classic rock as "Pure Rock 105 XTQ", launching with "For Those About to Rock (We Salute You)" by AC/DC and "Rockin' In the Free World" by Neil Young.

Logo as "Power 105" used until 2023.
