= XHONG-FM =

Radio station in Ojinaga, Chihuahua

- Ojinaga, Chihuahua; Mexico
- Frequency: 100.9 FM
- Branding: La Poderosa

Programming
- Format: Regional Mexican

Ownership
- Owner: Grupo BM Radio; (Eber Joel Beltrán Zamarrón)

History
- First air date: December 5, 1997 (concession)
- Call sign meaning: OjiNaGa

Technical information
- Licensing authority: CRT
- Class: AA
- ERP: 3.9 kW
- HAAT: 0.8 m (2 ft 7 in)

Links
- Webcast: Listen live
- Website: gbmradio.com

XHONG-FM is a radio station on 100.9 FM in Ojinaga, Chihuahua, Mexico. The station is owned by Grupo BM Radio and carries a Regional Mexican format known as La Poderosa.

== History ==
XHONG received its concession on December 5, 1997. It was originally owned by Francisco Javier Velasco Siles, but in 2010 the concession was transferred to a Radiorama subsidiary. Radiorama then sold XHONG to BM.
