= WAMX =

- Milton, West Virginia; United States
- Broadcast area: Huntington metro area
- Frequency: 106.3 MHz
- Branding: 106.3 The Brew

Programming
- Format: Classic rock
- Affiliations: Premiere Networks; Premium Choice

Ownership
- Owner: iHeartMedia, Inc.; (iHM Licenses, LLC)
- Sister stations: WBVB, WKEE-FM, WZWB, WTCR-FM, WVHU

History
- First air date: October 1, 1980
- Former call signs: WNST-FM (1980–1985); WAEZ-FM (1985–93); WZZW (1993–94); WFXN (1994–97)
- Call sign meaning: W Album MiX

Technical information
- Licensing authority: FCC
- Facility ID: 60450
- Class: B1
- ERP: 1,650 watts
- HAAT: 338 meters (1,109 ft)
- Transmitter coordinates: 38°30′21.00″N 82°12′33.00″W

Links
- Public license information: Public file; LMS
- Webcast: Listen Live
- Website: 1063thebrew.iheart.com

WAMX (106.3 FM, "106.3 The Brew") is a classic rock radio station licensed to Milton, West Virginia, serving the Huntington metro area. Owned by iHeartMedia, Inc. The WAMX studios are located in Huntington, while the station transmitter resides near Ona, West Virginia. In addition to a standard analog transmission, WAMX is available online via iHeartRadio.

== History ==
The station began broadcasting on October 1, 1980, under the callsign WNST-FM.

In May 1985, the station changed to (WAEZ) an easy listening format.

Circa 1990, the format switched to oldies encompassing the 50s, 60s, and 70s. Principal on air personalities included Dave Z (Carlisle) in the morning, Jack O'Shea in the afternoon, and Brian "Doc of Rock" Atkins in the evening.

In the autumn of 1991, WAEZ switched to the Oldies Radio/"Good Time Rock 'n Roll" satellite feed furnished by the Satellite Music Network. However, O'Shea was allowed to maintain his weekday afternoon slot from 2 to 6 PM and Atkins stayed on as the News Director in the mornings giving the newscast at the top of the hour during the Zippo in the Morning feed.

In late 1993, the call letters were changed to WZZW. Shortly thereafter in early 1994, the format was switched to a rock format provided by satellite.

In early 1996, the station became The Fox with Morning Host Scott Hesson live and Westwood One Classic Rock outside morning drive.

In 1997, the call letters were changed to WAMX (resurrecting the call letters once used by 93.7 WDGG from 1970 to 1988), the tag became "X-106.3", and the format was changed to progressive rock.

WAMX is now 1063 The Brew, playing classic rock with Scott Hesson back in the afternoon slot
