= WSCW =

Simulcasting WWQB Westwood, KY
- South Charleston, West Virginia; United States
- Broadcast area: Charleston, West Virginia
- Frequency: 1410 kHz
- Branding: 102.3 The Hound

Programming
- Format: Americana; folk

Ownership
- Owner: L.M. Communications, Inc.; (WKLC, Inc.)
- Sister stations: WMXE; WWQB; WKLC-FM; WJYP

History
- First air date: August 9, 1964 (first license granted)
- Call sign meaning: "We're Sharing Christ's Word" (former format) or South Charleston, West Virginia

Technical information
- Licensing authority: FCC
- Facility ID: 12076
- Class: D
- Power: 5,000 watts day
- Transmitter coordinates: 38°22′34″N 81°42′13″W
- Translator: 102.3 W272DW (South Charleston)

Links
- Public license information: Public file; LMS
- Webcast: Listen live
- Website: www.houndfm.com

WSCW (1410 AM) is a radio station licensed to serve South Charleston, West Virginia, United States. The station is owned by WKLC, Inc.

On May 20, 2026, WSCW changed its format from conservative talk to a simulcast of Americana/folk-formatted WWQB (102.3 FM), branded as "102.3 The Hound".
