= KWLP =

Radio station of the Hualapai Tribe in Peach Springs, Arizona

- Peach Springs, Arizona; United States
- Frequency: 100.9 MHz
- Branding: KWLP WALAPAI 100.9 FM formerly "The Peach 100.9"

Programming
- Format: Variety

Ownership
- Owner: The Hualapai Tribe

History
- Call sign meaning: The original spelling of the tribe's name WaLaPai

Technical information
- Licensing authority: FCC
- Facility ID: 191061
- Class: A
- ERP: 2,200 watts
- HAAT: 167 meters (548 ft)
- Transmitter coordinates: 35°33′17″N 113°23′41″W

Links
- Public license information: Public file; LMS
- Webcast: Listen live
- Website: kwlpradio.com

KWLP (100.9 FM) is a radio station licensed to serve the community of Peach Springs, Arizona. The station is owned by The Hualapai Tribe and airs a variety format.

The station was assigned the KWLP call letters by the Federal Communications Commission on February 28, 2014.

The Call letters KWLP represent the traditional spelling of the tribes name WaLaPai.

The station originally started up as an internet based radio station known as E-pch "The Peach" designed for youth oriented programming. The station switched from the internet based radio station to FM and branded as 100.9 KWLP The PEACH "Playing all kinds of Music for all of Peach Springs".

On October 27, 2025 the station rebranded to "Hualapai's Best Variety" WALAPAI 100.9 KWLP
