= WLSK =

- Lebanon, Kentucky; United States
- Frequency: 100.9 MHz
- Branding: Country 100.9 WLSK

Programming
- Format: Country
- Affiliations: ABC Radio, Jones Radio Network, Westwood One

Ownership
- Owner: Carolyn Lundy and Dave Colvin; (Simply Cool Radio, LLC)
- Sister stations: Cool Hits 106.5/1590 WLBN

Technical information
- Licensing authority: FCC
- Facility ID: 36886
- Class: A
- ERP: 3,900 watts
- HAAT: 126 meters
- Transmitter coordinates: 37°41′43″N 85°19′06″W

Links
- Public license information: Public file; LMS

WLSK (100.9 FM) is a radio station broadcasting a country music format. Licensed to Lebanon, Kentucky, United States, the station is currently owned by Carolyn Lundy and Dave Colvin, through licensee Simply Cool Radio, LLC, and features programming from Associated Press, and Westwood One.

== History ==
On November 29, 2011, WLSK changed its format from adult hits (as "Mike FM") to country, branded as "Country Mike 100.9".
