= KHMU =

- Buttonwillow, California; United States
- Frequency: 100.9 MHz
- Branding: La Fiera 100.9

Programming
- Format: Regional Mexican

Ownership
- Owner: Hispanic Target Media, Inc.

History
- First air date: February 18, 2015

Technical information
- Licensing authority: FCC
- Facility ID: 183310
- Class: A
- ERP: 3,800 watts
- HAAT: 126 meters (413 ft)
- Transmitter coordinates: 35°19′40″N 119°42′58″W
- Translators: 102.1 K271DD (Bakersfield); 102.1 K271DF (Conner)

Links
- Public license information: Public file; LMS
- Webcast: Listen live
- Website: lafierafm.com

KHMU (100.9 FM) is a class A radio station broadcasting out of Buttonwillow, California.

== History ==
KHMU began broadcasting on February 18, 2015.
