= WWQB =

- Westwood, Kentucky; United States
- Broadcast area: Huntington, West Virginia
- Frequency: 102.3 MHz
- Branding: 102.3 The Hound

Programming
- Format: Americana; folk

Ownership
- Owner: Serge Martin Enterprises, Inc.
- Operator: LM Communications
- Sister stations: WKLC-FM; WJYP; WSCW; WMXE

History
- First air date: 2011

Technical information
- Licensing authority: FCC
- Facility ID: 166078
- Class: B1
- ERP: 15,000 watts
- HAAT: 131 meters (430 ft)
- Transmitter coordinates: 38°25′24″N 82°32′13″W

Links
- Public license information: Public file; LMS
- Webcast: Listen live
- Website: www.houndfm.com

WWQB (102.3 FM) is a radio station licensed to serve the community of Westwood, Kentucky. The station is owned by Serge Martin Enterprises, Inc., and airs an Americana/folk music format, in a simulcast with sister station WSCW in Charleston, West Virginia.

The station was assigned the WWQB call letters by the Federal Communications Commission on March 28, 2011.

On May 20, 2026, WWQB dropped its simulcast with WMXE and launched an Americana/bluegrass format now simulcast on WSCW and operated by LM Communications under a local marketing agreement, branded as "102.3 The Hound". Both stations carry a similar format to that of LM-operated WZNN in nearby Lexington, Kentucky; notably, to help differentiate, this station places a similar region-local focus on Appalachian music, semibranding the format as "The Sounds of Appalachia".
