= WFFR-LP =

- Roosevelt Park, Michigan; United States
- Frequency: 100.9 MHz
- Branding: Muskegon 100.9 FM

Programming
- Format: Classic hits

Ownership
- Owner: Shoreline Broadcasting, Inc

History
- First air date: 2014

Technical information
- Licensing authority: FCC
- Facility ID: 196190
- Class: L1
- ERP: 100 watts
- HAAT: 30 metres (98 ft)
- Transmitter coordinates: 43°11′27.72″N 86°16′1.37″W

Links
- Public license information: LMS
- Webcast: Listen live
- Website: Official Website

WFFR-LP (100.9 FM) is a radio station licensed to serve the community of Roosevelt Park, Michigan. The station is owned by Shoreline Broadcasting, Inc. It airs a classic hits format.

The station was assigned the WFFR-LP call letters by the Federal Communications Commission on April 9, 2014.
