= WCMI (AM) =

Coordinates: 38°28′02″N 82°35′49″W

- Ashland, Kentucky; United States
- Broadcast area: Huntington, West Virginia
- Frequency: 1340 kHz
- Branding: Cat Sports 93.3FM - 1340AM

Programming
- Format: Sports
- Affiliations: ESPN Radio

Ownership
- Owner: Kindred Communications; (Fifth Avenue Broadcasting Company, Inc.)
- Sister stations: WCMI-FM, WDGG, WMGA, WRVC, WXBW

History
- First air date: 1935
- Former frequencies: 1310 kHz (1935–1941)
- Call sign meaning: Where Coal Meets Iron

Technical information
- Licensing authority: FCC
- Facility ID: 21588
- Class: C
- Power: 1,000 watts
- Translator: 93.3 W227CI (Catlettsburg, Kentucky)

Links
- Public license information: Public file; LMS
- Webcast: Listen live
- Website: catsports933.com

WCMI (1340 AM) is a commercial radio station licensed to Ashland, Kentucky, United States, serving the greater Huntington–Ashland metropolitan area. Owned by Kindred Communications, it is an ESPN Radio affiliate, with studios downtown Huntington, while its transmitter is sited in Perry Township, Ohio.

In addition to its primary AM signal, WCMI also operates an FM translator on 99.3 FM as W227CI, licensed to Catlettsburg, Kentuck.

== History ==
The station changed its call letters from WMFP on February 26, 1935. It broadcast at 1310 kcs, with 100 watts. That year, out-of-town football games of Ashland High School were sponsored on WCMI by the Boyd County Democratic Campaign Committee. Permission was granted in July 1936 to increase daytime wattage to 250. In mid-1939, the station was sold to J. Lindsay Nunn and Gilmore N. Nunn, father and son, by B. F. Forgey and J. T. Norris, and became affiliated with the Mutual Broadcasting System on September 24. The station was reassigned to 1340 kcs on March 29, 1941, by the Federal Communications Commission under the Havana Treaty.

On June 15, 1945, WCMI switched affiliations from Mutual to CBS, an event highlighted by a day's celebration, including a downtown parade in Huntington and a dedicatory program on which heads of the three city governments served by the station — Ashland, Huntington and Ironton, Ohio— appeared. The three city mayors simultaneously proclaimed the week June 15–22 as "CBS Week". A month-long promotion campaign leading to the network affiliation included front-page newspaper ads and stories, sales letters to agencies and billboards and car cards in the three cities. Among the staff members at the time were Clay Dopp, Louis Lageman, Whitney Richard (Dick) Martin and women's director Sara Fisher.

In August 1953, the FCC approved the sale of the station by the Nunns to Great Trails Broadcasting for $140,000. Great Trails was controlled by Charles W. Sawyer, ex-U.S. Commerce Secretary, which also took over WCMI's application for a television station to broadcast on Channel 13 from Huntington, which was withdrawn in March 1954. The station was sold again on June 20, 1956, to Edwina Broadcasting Corp., owned by George H. Clinton, for $165,000, and then to WCMI Radio Inc., owned by Frederic Gregg Jr., in October 1958 for $69,285. WCMI dropped its CBS affiliation in February 1958, resuming it on February 29, 1960.

The station changed hands in December 1959, sold to WOMP, Inc., run by Donald J. Horton and G.D. Kincaid, for $163,000. By June 1962, the station increased its power from 250 to 1,000 watts during the daytime.

In 2007, WCMI aired a progressive talk radio format under the branding Progressive Talk 1340. Prior to 2016, WCMI simulcast the sports format on WRVC. On September 6, 2016, WCMI split from the simulcasting and launched its own unique sports format as Cat Sports 93.3, focusing on Kentucky Wildcats athletics.

== Programming ==
WCMI primarily airs programs from ESPN Radio. The station also airs two daily programs focusing on Kentucky Wildcats athletics—Kentucky Sports Radio and The Leach Report—that originates from WLAP in Lexington, Kentucky.

WCMI maintains affiliations with several regional sports teams. The station airs Kentucky Wildcats college sports via the UK Sports Network and Cincinnati Bengals NFL games through the Cincinnati Bengals Radio Network.
