= KESA (FM) =

- Eureka Springs, Arkansas; United States
- Frequency: 100.9 MHz
- Branding: KESA 100.9 FM

Programming
- Format: Adult contemporary

Ownership
- Owner: Jay Bunyard; (Carroll County Broadcasting, Inc.)

History
- First air date: May 13, 1985 (as KTCN)
- Former call signs: KNPY (12/3/1984-12/21/1984); KTCB (1984–2008)

Technical information
- Licensing authority: FCC
- Facility ID: 48520
- Class: A
- ERP: 2,000 watts
- HAAT: 155.0 meters (508.5 ft)
- Transmitter coordinates: 36°22′47.5″N 93°44′52.6″W

Links
- Public license information: Public file; LMS

KESA (100.9 FM) is an adult contemporary radio station licensed to Eureka Springs, Arkansas, United States. The station is currently owned by Jay Bunyard, through licensee Carroll County Broadcasting, Inc.
