= WRVC (AM) =

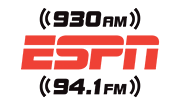
- Huntington, West Virginia; United States
- Broadcast area: Huntington, West Virginia; Ashland, Kentucky; Ironton, Ohio
- Frequency: 930 kHz
- Branding: ESPN Huntington 94.1 FM and AM 930

Programming
- Format: Sports
- Affiliations: ESPN Radio; Marshall Thundering Herd football; Pittsburgh Pirates Radio Network; Cincinnati Bengals Radio Network

Ownership
- Owner: Kindred Communications
- Sister stations: WCMI, WCMI-FM, WDGG, WMGA, WXBW

History
- First air date: 1923 (as WSAZ)
- Former call signs: WSAZ (1923–1970); WGNT (1970–1988); WTKZ (1991–1994)
- Call sign meaning: W RiVer Cities

Technical information
- Licensing authority: FCC
- Facility ID: 21435
- Class: B
- Power: 5,000 watts day 1,000 watts night
- Transmitter coordinates: 38°24′03″N 82°29′42″W
- Translator: 94.1 W231BS (Huntington)

Links
- Public license information: Public file; LMS
- Webcast: Listen Live
- Website: wrvc.com

WRVC (930 kHz) is an ESPN Radio–affiliated sports–formatted station licensed to Huntington, West Virginia, United States, and serving the greater Huntington–Ashland metropolitan area. The station is owned by Huntington–based Kindred Communications as part of a conglomerate with Ashland, Kentucky–licensed ESPN Radio–affiliated sports station WCMI (1340 AM), Catlettsburg, Kentucky–licensed active rock station WCMI-FM (92.7 FM), Ashland–licensed country music station WDGG (93.7 FM), Kenova, West Virginia–licensed adult contemporary station WMGA (97.9 FM), and Gallipolis, Ohio–licensed classic country station WXBW (101.5 FM). All six stations share studios on Fifth Avenue in downtown Huntington, while its transmitter facilities off of Park Avenue near I-64 in southwestern Huntington.

In addition to its primary AM signal, WRVC also operates an FM translator on 94.1 FM as W231BS. Its transmitter is located at the Kindred studios in downtown Huntington.

== History ==
WRVC began operations on October 16, 1923 as WSAZ, operated by Glenn Chase in his electric shop in Pomeroy, Ohio. The call letters were sequentially assigned by the United States Department of Commerce between WSAX in Chicago, Illinois (now defunct) and WSAY in Port Chester, New York. However, to this day local legend holds that the call letters stand for "Worst Station from A to Z".

By 1926, Chase realized he was in over his head making the station profitable, and moved it across and down the Ohio River to Huntington. He then sold controlling interest to Huntington businessman W. C. McKellar, but stayed on as station manager. McKellar used the station to help sell radios at his store on Fourth Avenue in downtown Huntington.

In 1927, McKellar sold a stake in WSAZ to the Huntington Publishing Company, publisher of Huntington's two newspapers, The Herald-Dispatch and the now-defunct Huntington Advertiser. Huntington Publishing bought full control in 1929.

The station came into its own when it stayed on the air commercial-free for nine straight days during the 1937 Ohio River flood. At the time, the station operated on 1190 kHz, and had to go off the air at sunset to protect clear-channel WOAI in San Antonio. However, it received permission from the federal government to stay on the air continuously in order to air appeals for help, information for loved ones and directives from officials working to combat the disaster. It stayed on the air for 182 hours straight from January 22 to January 31. This cemented its status as the Tri-State's primary AM station.

In 1949, WSAZ-TV signed on as West Virginia's first television station. Huntington Publishing sold WSAZ-AM-TV to Goodwill Stations of Detroit in 1961 for $6 million, earning a handsome return on its investment of 34 years prior. Goodwill was merged into Capital Cities Communications in 1964. Capital Cities spun off the WSAZ stations in 1971 as a result of its purchase of several stations from Triangle Publications, with WSAZ radio going to Stoner Broadcasting. After briefly announcing it would change the radio station's calls to WHWV, the calls became WGNT (for GiaNT) on June 1, 1970. They became WRVC in 1988, calls it retains today, except for a three-year stint as WTKZ from 1991 to 1994.

Currently it markets itself as "ESPN 94.1 FM & AM 930" since August 2016 and before that, the addition of an FM translator and change of the format to talk/sports (as "Supertalk 94.1 FM and AM 930") was first made in May 2009.

Nationally owned competitor Clear Channel (now iHeartMedia moved Rush Limbaugh and the Cincinnati Reds to WVHU, whereupon WRVC 930 AM joined Air America Radio network in 2004. In November 2006, WRVC became an almost 24/7 sports station for about three years, but also carried local music and church on weekends and daily local talk. "Supertalk" was a mix of news, talk and sports on May 18, 2009, the approximate of lineup mix the station had prior to 2006.

In 2014, the station once again went back to ESPN as its main programming, with MetroNews providing state talk, the Statewide Sportsline and other sports programming from ESPN, Westwood One, the Cincinnati Bengals, Cleveland Cavaliers and Pittsburgh Pirates. Programming also includes "The Drive," hosted by Paul Swann, a local sports talk show that airs weekdays from 5 p.m. to 6 p.m. The program won Best Talk Show in a ranked market at the 2019 and 2024 West Virginia Broadcasters Association Excellence in Broadcasting Awards. Additionally, Swann was named the 2022 National Sports Media Association West Virginia Sportscaster of the Year. In 2026, he received the Virginias Associated Press Broadcasters Lifetime Achievement Award.

== Programming ==
WRVC is primarily an affiliate of ESPN Radio. The station also carries many local sports since 2013, including Marshall Thundering Herd football as co-flagship with sister station WDGG, as well as high school sports from Huntington High School. It has carried Thundering Herd sports for all but a few years since moving across the Ohio River. WRVC serves as an affiliate of the Pittsburgh Pirates Radio Network and the Cincinnati Bengals Radio Network. It also carries nationally syndicated games from Major League Baseball, the National Football League and playoffs up to and including the Super Bowl and the National Basketball Association, as well as NCAA Basketball and "March Madness" Championships, along with many college bowl games, including the College Football Playoff.

== Translator ==
WRVC operates an FM translator in Huntington:

Broadcast translator for WRVC
Call sign	Frequency	City of license	FID	ERP (W)	HAAT	Class	Transmitter coordinates	FCC info
W231BS	94.1 FM	Huntington, West Virginia	147849	250	18.2 m (60 ft)	D	38°25′04″N 82°26′58″W	LMS
