= WATH =

- Athens, Ohio; United States
- Broadcast area: Southeastern Ohio
- Frequency: 970 kHz
- Branding: 97 WATH

Programming
- Format: Oldies
- Affiliations: ABC News Radio; Cincinnati Bengals Radio Network

Ownership
- Owner: Alan Stockmeister; (Total Media Group)
- Sister stations: WXTQ

History
- First air date: October 25, 1950
- Call sign meaning: Athens

Technical information
- Licensing authority: FCC
- Facility ID: 71096
- Class: D
- Power: 1,000 watts day; 26 watts night
- Transmitter coordinates: 39°20′40.00″N 82°6′21.00″W
- Translator: 97.3 W247DR (Athens)

Links
- Public license information: Public file; LMS
- Webcast: Listen Live
- Website: WATH Online

WATH (970 AM) is a radio station broadcasting an oldies format. Licensed to Athens, Ohio, United States, the station is currently owned by Total Media Group and features programming from ABC News Radio.

== History ==
970 WATH first hit the airwaves in Athens, Ohio, on October 25, 1950. In late 2022, it switched FM translator frequencies from 97.1 FM to 97.3 FM. On October 30, 2023, WATH changed their format from classic hits to adult contemporary, branded as "Mix 97.3". Later, in January 2025, WATH would once again change their format from adult contemporary to sports talk, and was rebranded as "97.3 WATH, The Game".

On July 10, 2026 at 3 pm, WATH changed their format from sports to oldies.

== Notable alumni ==
- Fred Palmer - (National Association of Broadcasters Broadcasting Hall of Fame)
- Thom Brennaman

== Previous logo ==
(WATH's logo under previous 97.1 translator frequency)
