= WJYP =

- St. Albans, West Virginia; United States
- Broadcast area: Western Kanawha County, West Virginia; Central Putnam County, West Virginia
- Frequency: 1300 kHz
- Branding: The Jock

Programming
- Format: Sports
- Affiliations: Fox Sports Radio; Westwood One Sports; Cincinnati Bengals Radio Network

Ownership
- Owner: L.M. Communications, Inc.; (WKLC, Inc.)
- Sister stations: WKLC-FM; WMXE; WSCW; WWQB

History
- First air date: 1956
- Former call signs: WGKV (1981-1983); WKAZ (1983-1992); WCOZ (1992-2002)
- Call sign meaning: "Joyful Praise" (former format)

Technical information
- Licensing authority: FCC
- Facility ID: 73176
- Class: D
- Power: 1,000 watts day 49 watts night
- Transmitter coordinates: 38°23′43.0″N 81°51′0.0″W
- Translator: 105.5 W288DP (St. Albans)

Links
- Public license information: Public file; LMS
- Webcast: Listen live
- Website: wjypam.com

WJYP (1300 AM) is a sports-formatted broadcast radio station licensed to St. Albans, West Virginia, United States, serving Western Kanawha County and Central Putnam County. WJYP is owned and operated by L.M. Communications, Inc.
