= WTHQ (AM) =

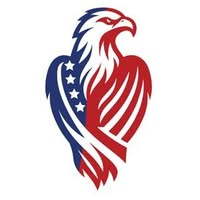
- Point Pleasant, West Virginia; United States
- Broadcast area: Point Pleasant, West Virginia; Mason County, West Virginia
- Frequency: 1030 kHz
- Branding: The Eagle

Programming
- Format: Conservative talk
- Affiliations: Fox News Radio

Ownership
- Owner: Total Media Group
- Sister stations: WBYG, WMPO, WYVK

History
- First air date: 1994
- Former call signs: WTGR (1988–1991); WBGS (1991–2016)
- Call sign meaning: W THe Q

Technical information
- Licensing authority: FCC
- Facility ID: 5284
- Class: D
- Power: 10,000 watts daytime 2,900 watts critical hours
- Transmitter coordinates: 38°48′42.0″N 82°5′59.0″W
- Translator: See below

Links
- Public license information: Public file; LMS
- Webcast: Listen Live
- Website: WTHQ Online

WTHQ (1030 kHz) is a conservative talk formatted broadcast radio station licensed to Point Pleasant, West Virginia, serving Point Pleasant and Mason County in West Virginia. WTHQ is owned and operated by Total Media Group.

== History ==
Prior to March 25, 2016, WTHQ was Southern Gospel formatted WBGS. The station simulcast on 105.9, the former frequency of translator W290BC. W290BC moved from 105.9 to 94.1 as W231CY on March 25 as well. In August 2024, the station became a conservative talk station dubbed "The Eagle".

Former logo

== Translator ==
In addition to the main station, WTHQ is relayed by an FM translator to widen its broadcast area.

Broadcast translator for WTHQ
Call sign	Frequency	City of license	FID	ERP (W)	HAAT	Class	FCC info
W231CY	94.1 FM	Point Pleasant, West Virginia	140377	170	75 m (246 ft)	D	LMS
