= WBBT (AM) =

- Lyons, Georgia; United States
- Frequency: 1340 kHz C-QUAM AM stereo

Programming
- Format: Oldies
- Affiliations: Westwood One

Ownership
- Owner: T.C.B. Broadcasting, Inc
- Sister stations: WLYU

History
- First air date: 1959
- Call sign meaning: "We are Building a Better Toombs"

Technical information
- Licensing authority: FCC
- Facility ID: 66967
- Class: C
- Power: 1,000 watts unlimited
- Transmitter coordinates: 32°12′48.67″N 82°19′54.45″W
- Translator: 96.9 W245DN (Lyons)

Links
- Public license information: Public file; LMS

WBBT (1340 AM) is a radio station broadcasting an oldies format in AM Stereo and is licensed to Lyons, Georgia, United States. The station is owned by T.C.B. Broadcasting, Inc and features programming from Westwood One.

== Translator ==
Call sign	Frequency	City of license	FID	ERP (W)	Class	Transmitter coordinates	FCC info
W245DN	96.9 FM	Lyons, Georgia	202088	250	D	32°12′50.7″N 82°19′50.8″W	LMS
