= WKEE-FM =

Radio station in Huntington, West Virginia, US

- Huntington, West Virginia; United States
- Broadcast area: Huntington, West Virginia; Ashland, Kentucky; Ironton, Ohio
- Frequency: 100.5 MHz
- Branding: KEE 100

Programming
- Format: Top 40 (CHR)
- Affiliations: Premiere Networks

Ownership
- Owner: iHeartMedia; (iHM Licenses, LLC)
- Sister stations: WAMX, WBVB, WTCR-FM, WVHU, WZWB

History
- First air date: 1947
- Former call signs: WHTN-FM (1947–1959)
- Call sign meaning: Key Broadcasting (former owner)

Technical information
- Licensing authority: FCC
- Facility ID: 500
- Class: B
- ERP: 53,000 watts
- HAAT: 171 meters (561 ft)
- Transmitter coordinates: 38°23′35.0″N 82°28′24.0″W

Links
- Public license information: Public file; LMS
- Webcast: WKEE-FM Webstream
- Website: WKEE-FM Online

WKEE-FM (100.5 MHz) is a contemporary hit radio formatted broadcast radio station licensed to Huntington, West Virginia, serving Huntington, West Virginia, Ashland, Kentucky, and Ironton, Ohio. WKEE-FM is owned and operated by iHeartMedia. WKEE-FM is the heritage CHR/Top 40 station in the Huntington area, having programmed hit music as a standalone FM for over 45 years (although its Top 40 heritage goes back to the early 1960s, when the station was a simulcast of WKEE 800 AM).

== History ==
WKEE was once known as WHTN-FM, beginning in 1947. It was the original FM sister station of AM 800 (now WVHU), which was originally WHTN and became WKEE around 1960, becoming the Huntington area's Top 40 music station. The AM and FM stations largely simulcast each other throughout the sixties and seventies. In about 1980, the AM station reverted to its original calls of WHTN and switched to country music, while the Top 40 format continued on WKEE-FM. WKEE-FM serves as the dominant CHR station in the Huntington market for many decades.
