= WLGN =

- Logan, Ohio; United States
- Frequency: 1510 kHz
- Branding: 103.3 LGN

Programming
- Format: Classic hits
- Affiliations: Cincinnati Bengals Radio Network

Ownership
- Owner: WLGN, LLC

History
- First air date: December 1967
- Call sign meaning: Logan

Technical information
- Licensing authority: FCC
- Facility ID: 38266
- Class: D
- Power: 1,000 watts day; 250 watts critical hours
- Transmitter coordinates: 39°31′43″N 82°23′06″W
- Translator: 103.3 W277CX (Logan)

Links
- Public license information: Public file; LMS

WLGN (1510 AM) is a radio station broadcasting a classic hits format. It is licensed to Logan, Ohio, United States. The station is owned by WLGN, LLC and features programming from the True Oldies Channel.

The station also broadcasts at 103.3 FM from translator W277CX.
