= WLYU =

- Lyons, Georgia; United States
- Frequency: 100.9 MHz

Programming
- Format: Country music
- Affiliations: Westwood One; Fox News Radio

Ownership
- Owner: T.C.B. Broadcasting, Inc.
- Sister stations: WBBT

History
- First air date: January 1, 1989

Technical information
- Licensing authority: FCC
- Facility ID: 66966
- Class: A
- ERP: 6,000 watts
- HAAT: 100 meters (330 ft)
- Transmitter coordinates: 32°6′48.7″N 82°23′51.5″W

Links
- Public license information: Public file; LMS

WLYU (100.9 FM) is a radio station broadcasting a country music format, licensed in Lyons, Georgia, United States. The station is currently owned by T.C.B. Broadcasting, Inc., and features programming from Westwood One.

Y-101 is also heavily involved in the community and broadcasts from Red Cross Bloodmobile drives in Lyons and Vidalia. The station also does live coverage of the Southeast Georgia Soap Box Derby. The station carries Georgia Southern Football. The station also covers Toombs County Sports. WLYU also carries Fox News.
