= WDYD-LP =

- Merrill, Wisconsin; United States
- Frequency: 100.9 MHz

Ownership
- Owner: The New Testament Church, Inc.

Technical information
- Licensing authority: FCC
- Facility ID: 131630
- Class: L1
- ERP: 95 watts
- HAAT: −4.6 m (−15 ft)
- Transmitter coordinates: 45°12′37.00″N 89°39′50.00″W

Links
- Public license information: LMS

WDYD-LP (100.9 FM) is a radio station licensed to Merrill, Wisconsin, United States. The station is currently owned by The New Testament Church, Inc.
