= WTCR-FM =

- Huntington, West Virginia; United States
- Broadcast area: Huntington, West Virginia
- Frequency: 103.3 MHz
- Branding: 103.3 TCR Country

Programming
- Format: Country

Ownership
- Owner: iHeartMedia; (iHM Licenses, LLC)
- Sister stations: WKEE-FM, WBVB, WAMX, WVHU, WZWB

Technical information
- Licensing authority: FCC
- Facility ID: 7983
- Class: B
- ERP: 50,000 watts
- HAAT: 150 meters (490 ft)
- Transmitter coordinates: 38°25′11″N 82°24′06″W

Links
- Public license information: Public file; LMS
- Webcast: WTCR-FM Webstream
- Website: WTCR-FM Online

WTCR-FM (103.3 FM) is a radio station broadcasting a country format. Licensed to Huntington, West Virginia, United States, it serves the Huntington area. The station is owned by iHeartMedia. From 1993 to 2017, the morning show was hosted by radio personalities Clint McElroy and Judy Eaton.
