= WMXE =

- South Charleston, West Virginia; United States
- Broadcast area: Charleston, West Virginia; Kanawha County, West Virginia
- Frequency: 100.9 MHz
- Branding: 100.9 The Mix

Programming
- Format: Classic hits
- Affiliations: West Virginia Mountaineers

Ownership
- Owner: WKLC, Inc.
- Sister stations: WJYP; WKLC-FM; WSCW; WWQB

History
- First air date: 1985
- Call sign meaning: "Mix"

Technical information
- Licensing authority: FCC
- Facility ID: 12077
- Class: A
- ERP: 3,000 watts
- HAAT: 91 meters (299 ft)
- Transmitter coordinates: 38°22′34″N 81°42′13″W

Links
- Public license information: Public file; LMS
- Webcast: Listen live
- Website: www.wvmix.com

WMXE (100.9 FM) is a classic hits formatted broadcast radio station licensed to South Charleston, West Virginia, serving Charleston and Kanawha County, West Virginia. WMXE is owned and operated by WKLC, Inc.
