= WBFY-LP =

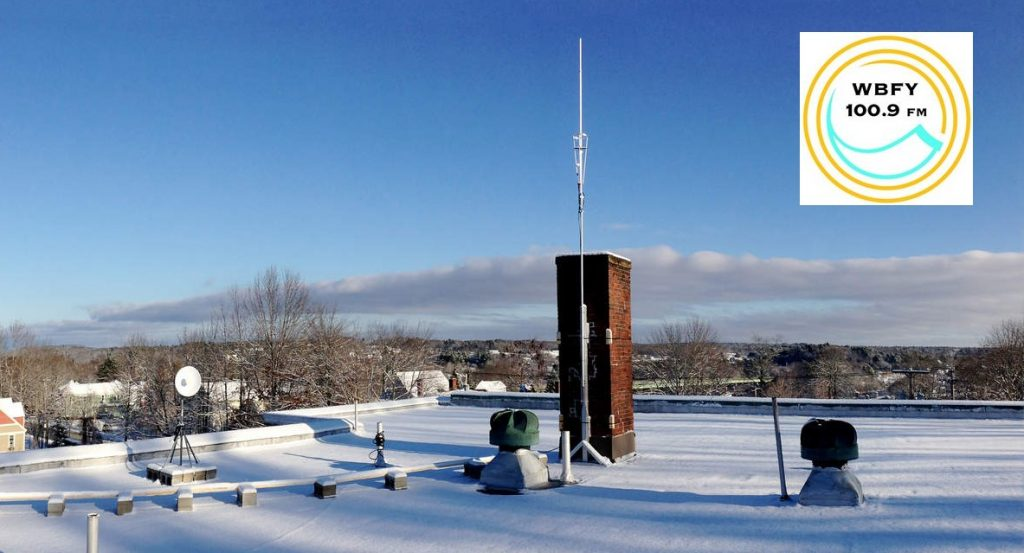
- Belfast, Maine; United States
- Frequency: 100.9 MHz

Programming
- Format: Community radio

Ownership
- Owner: City of Belfast, Maine
- Operator: Belfast Community Radio

History
- First air date: December 17, 2016
- Call sign meaning: "We Broadcast For You!"

Technical information
- Licensing authority: FCC
- Facility ID: 193342
- ERP: 100 watts
- HAAT: 2.13 meters (7.0 ft)
- Transmitter coordinates: 44°25′46″N 69°0′50″W

Links
- Public license information: LMS
- Website: belfastcommunityradio.org

WBFY-LP is a low-power, community radio station in Belfast, Maine, United States. It broadcasts at 100.9 FM from a studio in the basement of a former elementary school, Waterfall Arts, on High Street. The range of the signal is 10–20 miles, depending on the weather and geographic conditions.

== History ==
The license is held by the City of Belfast, but the station itself was created and run by a group of volunteers, called Belfast Community Radio.

The station was constructed in early December 2016, by the technical committee—Pete Dalton, Erik Klausmeyer, Vic Tredwell, Zafra Whitcomb—and many other helpers. The basement room was soundproofed with donated acoustic tiles. Equipment was selected, purchased, and installed. The antenna was strapped to the chimney of the building using a metal-banding machine from the transfer station. A dedicated internet connection was established.

After a brief period of testing, the station launched on December 17, 2016, with a marathon show of live music and interviews from noon until 8 pm. A dozen local music groups appeared in the show, as well as city counselors and other supporters of the station. After that, the 'robot DJ' -- a computer program—took over. It broadcasts music 24/7, except when human DJs are training, or the station is transmitting prerecorded shows by community members. The station's second major event was held on New Year's Eve. Concerts put on by the 20th Annual New Years By The Bay were recorded, and hand carried to the station. These were broadcast with a one-hour delay, along with good wishes call-ins. Both of the marathon shows were produced by Vic Tredwell, with help from many volunteers.

== Future ==
The programming committee, led by Karen Nelson and Judi Erickson, is recruiting and training programmers. Regular music and public service shows started in January. The governance committee, led by Zafra Whitcomb and Lane Sturtevant, is working toward bylaws and incorporation. When these legal structures are in place, the City of Belfast will transfer the license to Belfast Community Radio.
