= KHMV-LP =

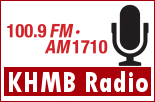
- Half Moon Bay, California; United States
- Frequency: 100.9 MHz
- Branding: KHMB Radio

Ownership
- Owner: Community Media Foundation

History
- First air date: February 14, 2014

Technical information
- Licensing authority: FCC
- Facility ID: 191762
- Class: L1
- ERP: 100 watts
- HAAT: −27.9 meters (−92 ft)
- Transmitter coordinates: 37°26′49.20″N 122°25′50.60″W

Links
- Public license information: LMS
- Webcast: Listen live
- Website: khmbradio.com

KHMV-LP is a low power radio station broadcasting out of Half Moon Bay, California.

== History ==
KHMV-LP began broadcasting on February 14, 2014.
