= Rádio 100 =

Rádio 100 (ZYC 418)
Fortaleza, Ceará; Brazil
- Frequency: 100.9 MHz

Programming
- Language: Portuguese
- Format: Evangelism; Christian music
- Affiliations: Rádio Deus é Amor

Ownership
- Owner: Rádio Pajeú FM Ltda.

History
- First air date: November 11, 1985
- Former names: Pajeú FM

Technical information
- Licensing authority: ANATEL
- Class: A1
- ERP: 18,9 kW

Links
- Public license information: Profile

Rádio 100 (ZYC 418) is a radio station licensed to Fortaleza, Ceará, serving the respective metropolitan area. The radio station is controlled through a partnership between businessmen Isaías Duarte, Carlinhos Aristides and Eberth Santos and its programming is leased to the God is Love Pentecostal Church, broadcasting the programming of Rádio Deus é Amor.

Founded on November 11, 1985 by Uirandé Borges, Adriano Mota Augusto Borges and José Romildo Ribeiro, the station was called Pajeú FM and had programming aimed at upper-class AC audiences. During the period in which it invested in popular programming, the station was among the highest-volume audiences in Fortaleza.

== History ==
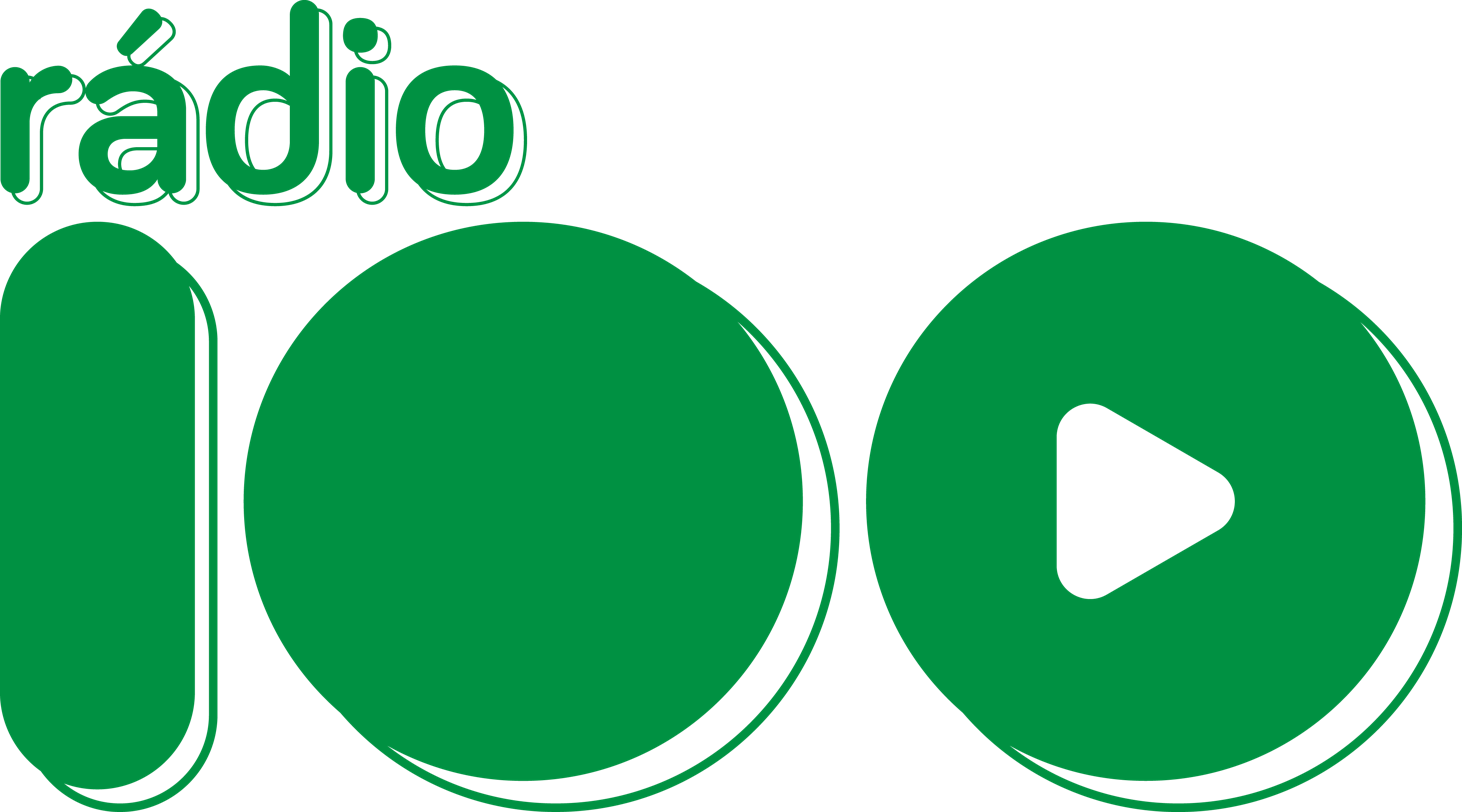
Radio logo between 2018 and 2019.

The frequency was founded as Pajeú FM on November 11, 1985, through the union of colonel Uirandé Augusto Borges with Adriano Mota Augusto Borges and José Romildo Ribeiro. In its first year on air, the radio station invested in an AC format, aimed at the upper classes. For this project, the artistic coordinator Eduardo Valença, from Cidade 99, was hired. One of the leading names of this phase was the then broadcaster Maísa Vasconcelos.

In 1986, the radio station reformulated its programming and began to feature a mix of CHR and popular programming, combining styles that had been running separately on FM do Povo and Verdes Mares FM respectively. This model lasted until 1992, when the station was renamed Rádio 100. At this time, the radio station invested in pop, rock and funk styles. As it consolidated its position among the C and D classes, it began to invest in pagode and sertanejo music.

Still in the 1990s, the radio station was sold to businessman and politician Zé Gerardo Arruda. Later, it was acquired by broadcaster Franzé Loiola for 800,000 reais. In 2007, 50% of its shares were sold to D&E Entretenimento, after which the other part was sold to A3 Entretenimento. The participation of people linked to A3 Entretenimento was investigated by the Federal Police of Brazil in Operation For All, launched in October 2016. Isaias Duarte and Carlinhos Aristides were investigated for tax evasion.

On February 28, 2019, the station dismissed its announcers and ceased broadcasting its local programming. At the end of the same day, it began rebroadcasting programming from Rádio Deus é Amor, after leasing it to the God is Love Pentecostal Church, marking the station's return to Fortaleza after a two-year absence following the end of its partnership with Rádio Iracema.

== Bibliography ==
- Canalito, Jorge; Leme, Paulinho (2007). Rádio FM: Em Fortaleza é outra história. Fortaleza, Ceará: Premius Editora. ISBN 9788590732907.
