= WZZW =

- Milton, West Virginia; United States
- Broadcast area: Huntington, West Virginia
- Frequency: 1600 kHz
- Branding: Pure Radio

Programming
- Format: Christian preaching

Ownership
- Owner: Pure Media Ministries; (Pure Media Ministries, Inc.)

History
- First air date: 1975
- Former call signs: WNST (1975–1995)

Technical information
- Licensing authority: FCC
- Facility ID: 506
- Class: D
- Power: 5,000 watts day; 26 watts night
- Transmitter coordinates: 38°25′46″N 82°06′21″W

Links
- Public license information: Public file; LMS
- Webcast: Listen Live
- Website: pureradio.org

WZZW (1600 AM) is a Christian preaching oriented radio station licensed to serve the community of Milton, West Virginia, as part of the Huntington radio market.

The station was assigned the WZZW call letters by the Federal Communications Commission on February 1, 1995.

On February 19, 2021, WZZW is being donated to Pure Media Ministries from the trust and will join the "Pure Radio" network after closing.

On April 16, 2021, Aloha Station Trust has closed on a sale for WZZW to Pure Media Ministries. It has since flipped to Pure Radio.
