= WKLC-FM =

- St. Albans, West Virginia; United States
- Broadcast area: Charleston, West Virginia; Huntington, West Virginia
- Frequency: 105.1 MHz
- Branding: Rock 105

Programming
- Format: Mainstream rock
- Affiliations: United Stations Radio Networks; Westwood One

Ownership
- Owner: L.M. Communications, Inc.; (WKLC, Inc.)
- Sister stations: WJYP; WMXE; WSCW; WWQB

History
- First air date: January 1, 1966

Technical information
- Licensing authority: FCC
- Facility ID: 73175
- Class: B
- Power: 2,950 watts
- HAAT: 484 meters (1,588 ft)
- Transmitter coordinates: 38°24′28″N 81°54′13″W

Links
- Public license information: Public file; LMS
- Webcast: Listen live
- Website: www.wklc.com

WKLC-FM (105.1 MHz, "Rock 105") is a mainstream rock formatted broadcast radio station licensed to St. Albans, West Virginia, serving the Charleston/Huntington area. WKLC-FM is owned and operated by L.M. Communications, Inc.
