= WCMI-FM =

- Catlettsburg, Kentucky; United States
- Broadcast area: Huntington–Ashland metropolitan area
- Frequency: 92.7 MHz
- Branding: 92.7/98.5 The Planet

Programming
- Format: Active rock
- Affiliations: United Stations Radio Networks

Ownership
- Owner: Kindred Communications; (Fifth Avenue Broadcasting Company, Inc.)
- Sister stations: WCMI, WRVC, WDGG, WMGA, WXBW

History
- First air date: 1972
- Former call signs: WCAK (1972–1985); WKQI (1986–1988); WCMI-FM (1988–1995); WRVC (1995–2009)
- Call sign meaning: Where Coal Meets Iron (from AM sister)

Technical information
- Licensing authority: FCC
- Facility ID: 21589
- Class: A
- ERP: 2,350 watts
- HAAT: 162 meters
- Translator: 98.5 W253BB (Huntington, West Virginia)

Links
- Public license information: Public file; LMS
- Webcast: Listen Live
- Website: planet927.com

WCMI-FM (92.7 MHz) is an active rock–formatted radio station licensed to Catlettsburg, Kentucky, United States, and serving the greater Huntington–Ashland metropolitan area. The station is currently owned by Huntington, West Virginia–based Kindred Communications as part of a conglomerate with Huntington–licensed ESPN Radio–affiliated sports station WRVC (930 AM), Ashland, Kentucky–licensed ESPN Radio-affiliated sports station WCMI (1340 AM), Ashland–licensed country music station WDGG (93.7 FM), Kenova, West Virginia–licensed adult contemporary station WMGA (97.9 FM), and Gallipolis, Ohio–licensed classic country station WXBW (101.5 FM). All six stations share studios on Fifth Avenue in downtown Huntington.

In addition to its primary signal, WCMI-FM also operates an FM translator on 98.5 FM as W253BB, licensed to Huntington.

== History ==
WCMI-FM went on-the-air in 1972 as WCAK. The station was co–owned by Edgar Kitchen and Hal Murphy under the name K&M Broadcasting.
