= KVCB-LP =

Radio station in Vacaville, California

- Vacaville, California; United States
- Frequency: 100.9 MHz (HD Radio)
- Branding: VCS Radio

Programming
- Format: Variety
- Subchannels: HD2: Student Produced Music; HD3: Classic Radio Drama; HD4: Community radio

Ownership
- Owner: Vacaville Christian Schools

History
- First air date: 2014

Technical information
- Licensing authority: FCC
- Facility ID: 192237
- Class: L1
- ERP: 100 watts
- Transmitter coordinates: 38°20′20″N 121°59′00″W

Links
- Public license information: LMS
- Website: kvcb-online.com

KVCB-LP (100.9 FM; "VCS Radio") is a radio station licensed to Vacaville, California, United States. The station is currently owned by Vacaville Christian Schools.

Programming on KVCB-LP is produced by the students of Vacaville Christian Elementary, Middle and High School.

KVCB-LP founded the National High School Radio Network to give high school broadcasting students across the United States experience in live network programming. Each high school in the group takes turns having their students host the one-hour radio show each Wednesday evening on a volunteer basis.
