= WIQI =

- Watseka, Illinois; United States
- Broadcast area: Iroquois County and Kankakee
- Frequency: 95.9 MHz
- Branding: Classic Rock 95.9 WIQI

Programming
- Format: Classic rock
- Affiliations: Fox News Radio

Ownership
- Owner: Smash Hit Media, Inc.

History
- First air date: February 2008 (part-time, as WMLF); June 23, 2015 (full-time)
- Former call signs: WMLF (2006–2011); WWWN (2011); WKQX (2011–2014)
- Call sign meaning: Previously used on the current WKQX in Chicago

Technical information
- Licensing authority: FCC
- Facility ID: 164237
- Class: A
- ERP: 6,000 watts
- HAAT: 74 meters (243 ft)
- Transmitter coordinates: 40°49′22″N 87°44′54″W

Links
- Public license information: Public file; LMS
- Webcast: Listen live
- Website: wiqiradio.com

WIQI (95.9 FM) is a radio station in Watseka, Illinois owned by Smash Hit Media. The station currently carries a classic rock format covering Watseka along with Iroquois County and Kankakee with an output of 6000 watts ERP.

== History ==
From 2011 until March 2015, the radio station used the WKQX call letters while the 101.1 frequency in the Chicago market that is best known for those call letters was itself known as WIQI. Both stations were owned by companies associated with radio executive Randy Michaels, at the time, and Radioactive, LLC was using a common practice in the radio industry to hold call letters in one market solely in order to prevent their use by a competitor in another. During this period, the station itself broadcast for only days at a time in each late winter in order to prevent the license from being revoked by the Federal Communications Commission (FCC) for inactivity. The station's original 14 meter HAAT 1000 watt signal was limited to Watseka. On January 16, 2014, its call letters changed from WKQX to WIQI with the return of the WKQX calls to 101.1 in Chicago.

In March 2015, the station asked for a construction permit to widen the signal's coverage, mainly towards the Kankakee area; this was granted on April 15. On June 23, 2015, WIQI placed this facility on the air; at that time, it began to broadcast full-time with daytime airstaff. This came shortly before the FCC began to disallow the abuse of license holding to keep a station silent on July 2, 2015.
