= Music radio =

Music-dominated radio

Music radio is a radio format in which music is the main broadcast content. After television replaced old time radio's dramatic content, music formats became dominant in many countries. Radio drama and comedy continue, often on public radio.

Music drives radio technology, including wide-band FM, modern digital radio systems such as Digital Radio Mondiale, and even the rise of internet radio and music streaming services (such as Pandora and Spotify).

When radio was the main form of entertainment, regular programming, mostly stories and variety shows, was the norm. If there was music, it was normally a live concert or part of a variety show. Backstage sound engineers who jockeyed discs (records) from one turntable to another to keep up with the live programming were often called disc jockeys.

With the mass production and popularity of records in the mid-1940s, as well as the birth of TV, it was discovered that a show was needed to simply play records and hire a disc jockey to host the program. One of the first disc jockeys (later called DJs) was Dick Clark. Others followed suit and today music radio is the most numerous format.

== Format ==
The radio station provides programming to attract listeners. Commercial radio stations make profits by selling advertising. Public and community radio stations are sustained by listener donations and grants. Young people are targeted by advertisers because their product preferences can be changed more easily. Therefore, the most commercially successful stations target young audiences.

The programming usually cycles from the least attractive item, to most attractive, followed by commercials. The purpose of this plan is to build listener interest during the programming. There are several standard ways of selecting the music, such as free-form, top-40, album-oriented rock, and Jack. These can be applied to all types of music.

Because dead air does not attract listeners, the station tries to fill its broadcast day with sound. Audiences will only tolerate a certain number of commercials before tuning away. In some regions, government regulators specify how many commercials can be played in a given hour.

Jingles are radio's equivalent of neon signs. Jingles are brief, bright pieces of choral music that promote the station's call letters, frequency and sometimes disc-jockey or program segment. Jingles are produced for radio stations by commercial specialty services such as JAM, in Texas. Jingles are often replaced by recorded voice-overs (called "stingers", also depending on region more often "liners").

In order to build station loyalty, the station announces time, station calls letters and frequency as often as six to twelve times per hour. Jingles and stingers (liners) help to give the station a branded sound in a pleasant, minimal amount of air-time. The legal requirement for station identification in the U.S. is once per hour, approximately at the top of the hour, or at the conclusion of a transmission.

News, time-checks, real-time travel advice and weather reports are often valuable to listeners. The news headlines and station identification are therefore given just before a commercial. Time, traffic and weather are given just after. The engineer typically sets the station clocks to standard local time each day, by listening to WWV or WWVH (see atomic clock). These segments are less valued by the most targeted market, young people, so many commercial stations shorten or omit these segments in favor of music.

While most music stations that offer news reports simply "tear and read" news items (from the newswires or the Internet), larger stations (generally those affiliated with news/talk stations) may employ an editor to rewrite headlines, and provide summaries of local news. Summaries fit more news in less air-time. Some stations share news collection with TV or newspapers in the same media conglomerate. An emerging trend is to use the radio station's web site to provide in-depth coverage of news and advertisers headlined on the air. Many stations contract with agencies such as Smartraveler and AccuWeather for their weather and traffic reports instead of using in-house staff. Fewer radio stations (except on medium and major market, depending on daypart) maintain a call-in telephone line for promotions and gags, or to take record requests. DJs of commercial stations do not generally answer the phone and edit the call during music plays in non-major markets, as the programming is either delivered via satellite, or voice-tracked using a computer. More and more stations take requests by e-mail and online chat only.

The value of a station's advertising is set by the number, age and wealth of its listeners. Arbitron, a commercial statistical service, historically used listener diaries to statistically measure the number of listeners. Arbitron diaries were collected on Thursdays, and for this reason, most radio stations have run special promotions on Thursdays, hoping to persuade last-minute Arbitron diarists to give them a larger market-share. Arbitron contractually prevents mention of its name on the air.

Promotions are the on-air equivalent of lotteries for listeners. Promotional budgets usually run about $1 per listener per year. In a large market, a successful radio station can pay a full-time director of promotions, and run several lotteries per month of vacations, automobiles and other prizes. Lottery items are often bartered from advertisers, allowing both companies to charge full prices at wholesale costs. For example, cruising companies often have unused capacity, and when given the choice, prefer to pay their bills by bartering cruise vacations. Since the ship will sail in any case, bartered vacations cost the cruise company little or nothing. The promotion itself advertises the company providing the prize. The FCC has defined a lottery as "any game, contest or promotion that combines the elements of prize, chance and consideration."

== Programming by time ==
Most music stations have DJs who play music from a playlist determined by the program director, arranged by blocks of time. Though practices differ by region and format, what follows is a typical arrangement in a North American urban commercial radio station.

The first block of the day is the "morning drive time" block in the early morning. Arbitron defines this block between 6 a.m. and 10 a.m., though it can begin as early as 5 a.m. (though usually not later than 6), and end as early as 9 a.m. or as late as 11 a.m. This block usually includes news bulletins and traffic and weather advisories for commuters, as well as light comedy from the morning DJ team (many shock jocks started as or still work on drive-time radio). Some stations emphasize music, and reduce gags and call-ins in this period.

The midday block (defined by Arbitron as 10 a.m. to 3 p.m., though often extended later to about 5 p.m.) is mostly music, and in many places is at least partially voicetracked from another market. For a period around noon a station may play nonstop music or go to an all-request format for people eating lunch. This block is often occupied by a "no-repeat workday;" stations that offer this feature usually target captive audiences such as retail workers, who have to listen to the station for long periods of time and can become irritated by repetition.

In the early evening, or "afternoon drive" (defined by Arbitron as 3 to 7 p.m.), the evening rush-hour programming resembles the midday programming, but adds traffic and weather advisories for commuters. Some stations insert a short snippet of stand-up comedy ("5 O'Clock Funnies") around 5 o'clock when commuters leave work, or play specifically selected "car tunes" ideal for listening while driving.

The evening block (defined by Arbitron as 7 p.m. to midnight), if present, returns to music. Syndicated programs such as Tom Kent or Delilah are popular in this shift.

The overnight programming, from midnight to the beginning of drive time, is generally low-key music with quiet, if any, announcing. Some stations play documentaries or even infomercials, while some others play syndicated or voicetracked DJs. Complete automation, with no jock, is very common in this day part. It is not uncommon to play more adventurous selections during late night programming blocks, since late night is generally not considered significant for ratings, and are not subject to federal restrictions as stringently as during the daytime. Stations are permitted to sign off during this time; in areas where AM radio is still significant (especially in the United States), local stations may be required to either sign off or cut to low-power to protect clear-channel stations.

Weekends, especially Sundays, often carry different programming. The countdown show, ranking the top songs of the previous week, has been a staple of weekend radio programming since 1970; current hosts of countdown shows in various formats include Rick Dees, Ryan Seacrest, Jeff Foxworthy, Kix Brooks, Bob Kingsley, Crook & Chase, Randy Jackson, Walt Love, Al Gross, Dick Bartley, and (via reruns) Casey Kasem. Other types of weekend programming include niche programming, retrospective shows and world music such as the Putumayo World Music Hour. Stations may carry shows with different genres of music such as blues or jazz. Community affairs and religious programming is often on Sunday mornings, generally one of the least listened-to periods of the week. In addition, weekend evenings are particularly specialized; a dance station might have a sponsored dance party at a local club, or a classical station may play an opera. Saturday nights are also similar to this; request shows, both local and national (e.g. Dick Bartley), are very popular on Saturday night. The longest running radio program in the country, the Grand Ole Opry, has aired on Saturday night since its inception in 1925.

Many music stations in the United States perform news and timechecks only sparingly, preferring to put more music on the air. News is often restricted to the talk-heavy commuting hours, though weather updates are still very common throughout the day, even on these stations. ABC FM News is an example of an American news network that is designed for music radio stations. The BBC and ABC take a different approach, with all of its stations giving news updates (BBC Radio 1Xtra produces its own news segments under the name TX.)

== Music formats ==
Some well-known music-radio formats are Top 40, Freeform Rock and AOR (Album Oriented Rock). It turns out that most other stations (such as Rhythm & Blues) use a variation of one of these formats with a different playlist. The way stations advertise themselves is not standardized. Some critical interpretation is needed to recognize classic formulas in the midst of the commercial glitz.

See List of music radio formats for further details, and note that there is a great deal of format evolution (or, to borrow a television term, channel drift) as music tastes and commercial conditions change. For example, the Beautiful music format that developed into today's Easy listening and Soft rock formats is nearly extinct due to a lack of interest from younger generations, whereas classic rock has become popular over the last 20 years or so and Jack FM has arisen only since 2000 or so. The most popular format in the U.S. is country music, but rock music sells the most.

=== Top 40 ===
The original formulaic radio format was Top 40 music, now known within the industry as contemporary hit radio or CHR. In this radio format, disc-jockeys would select one of a set of the forty best-selling singles (usually in a rack) as rated by Billboard magazine or from the station's own chart of the local top selling songs. In general, the more aggressive "Top 40" stations could sometimes be better described as "Top 20" stations. They would aggressively skirt listener boredom to play only the most popular singles.

Top 40 radio would punctuate the music with jingles, promotions, gags, call-ins, and requests, brief news, time and weather announcements and most importantly, advertising. The distinguishing mark of a traditional top-40 station was the use of a hyperexcited disc-jockey, and high tempo jingles. The format originated in the United States. Todd Storz originated the idea of Top 40 music programming in 1953."Storz, Todd (1924-1964)". Encyclopedia of the Great Plains. University of Nebraska–Lincoln.. Todd Storz and Gordon McLendon invented Top 40 radio. Bill Drake and Rick Sklar have had a lasting modern influence.

Variants and hybrids include the freeform-like Jack FM (mentioned below under Freeform Rock) and the "Mix" formats mentioned below under Oldies. Top 40 music is heavily criticized by some music fans as being repetitive and of low quality, and is almost exclusively dominated by large media conglomerates such as iHeartMedia and CBS Corporation. Top 40 tends to be underrepresented on the Internet, being mostly the domain of commercial broadcasters such as Virgin Radio UK.

Some of the most famous Top 40 stations have been Musicradio 77 WABC/New York City, Boss Radio 93 KHJ/Los Angeles, The Big 89 WLS/Chicago, 1050 CHUM/Toronto, Famous 56 WFIL/ Philadelphia, and The Big 68 WRKO/Boston. Today, there are popular Top 40 stations such as WHTZ-Z100/New York City, 102.7 KIIS-FM/, and KAMP-97.1 AMP Radio/ in Los Angeles, and Jovem Pan in Brazil

=== Freeform and progressive rock ===
A later development was freeform radio, later commercially developed as progressive rock radio, and still later even more commercially developed as AOR (Album-Oriented Rock), in which selections from an album would be played together, with an appropriate introduction.

Traditional free-form stations prided themselves on offering their disc jockeys freedom to play significant music and make significant social commentary and humor. This approach developed commercial problems because disc jockeys attracted to this freedom often had tastes substantially different from the audience, and lost audience share. Also, freeform stations could lack predictability, and listeners' loyalty could then be put at risk. Progressive rock radio (not to be confused with the progressive rock music genre) was freeform in style but constrained so that some kind of rock music was what was always or almost always played.

Responsible jocks would realize their responsibility to the audience to produce a pleasant show, and try to keep the station sound predictable by listening to other jocks, and repeating some of their music selections. WNEW-FM in New York during the 1970s exemplified this approach to progressive rock radio.

Freeform radio is particularly popular as a college radio format; offshoots include the recent (and somewhat controversial, due to its lack of on-air personalities) eclectic-pop format known as variety hits, which plays a wide assortment of mostly top-40 music from a span of several decades; and podcast radio, a mostly talk format pioneered by Infinity Broadcasting's KYOU station in California and Adam Curry's Podcast show on Sirius Satellite Radio.

=== AOR (album-oriented rock) ===
AOR (album-oriented rock) developed as a commercial compromise between top-forties-style formulas and progressive rock radio/freeform. A program director or music consultant would select some set of music "standards" and require the playlist to be followed, perhaps in an order selected by the jock. The jock would still introduce each selection, but the jock would have available a scripted introduction to use if he was not personally familiar with a particular piece of music and its artist. Obviously a computer helps a lot in this process.

A useful, relatively safe compromise with the artistic freedom of the jocks is that a few times each hour, usually in the least commercially valuable slots of the hour, the disc-jockey can highlight new tracks that he or she thinks might interest the audience. The audience is encouraged to comment on the new tracks, allowing the station to track audience tastes. The freedom to introduce new artists can help a station develop its library.

Significant AOR offshoots include classic rock and adult album alternative.

=== Oldies, standards, and classic rock ===
Classic rock or oldies formats have been described as having the weakness of not playing new artists. This is true in a creative sense, but not a commercial one. Conventional wisdom in the radio industry is that stations will not get good ratings or revenue if they frequently play songs unfamiliar to their audience. This is why "Top 40" stations played only the biggest hits and why oldies and classic rock formats do the same for the eras they cover. An inherent danger to this philosophy is that closed-campus work environments, such as retail, foster an environment where listeners hear the station continuously for several hours, multiple days in a row, which can become unpleasant after a short amount of time. Oldies and related formats do have an inherent advantage in that they have a much broader time frame (up to 30 years, compared to the current hits of a top-40 station) from which to draw their playlist and can thus play a greater variety of songs than a station bound to devote the majority of its spins to a limited list. The ideal "classic" station (of whatever format) finds the balance between playing listener favorites frequently enough to develop a base while at the same time cultivating a playlist broad enough not to breed contempt. Nevertheless, there seems to be a cottage industry of Internet stations specializing in specific forms of classic rock and oldies, particularly psychedelic rock and progressive rock.

The oldies and classic rock formats have a strong niche market, but as the audience becomes older the station becomes less attractive to advertisers. Advertisers perceive older listeners as set in their brand choices and not as responsive to advertising as younger, more impulsive listeners. Oldies stations must occasionally change to more youthful music formats; as a result, the definition of what constitutes an "oldies" station has gradually changed over the years (and the phrase "oldies" itself is falling out of use except for the stations that still regularly play music from the 1960s and earlier). This is why many oldies stations, like WCBS-FM in New York City and WJMK in Chicago, have switched over to the younger-oriented Jack FM format in recent years—although WCBS-FM adopted a Classic Hits format on July 12, 2007, and the "Jack FM" format was moved to its HD2 subchannel. Unlike WCBS-FM's pre-JACK format which was centered on the 1955–1979 era, the post-JACK station was based on the 1964-1989 era because of the aging listener demographics of the original format.

This preference for younger listeners caused the decline of the "Big Band" or "Standards" music formats that covered music from the 1930s to the 1950s. As the audience grew too old for advertisers, the radio stations that carried these formats saw a sharp loss of ratings and revenue. This left them with no choice but to adopt more youthful formats, though the Standards format (also known as the Great American Songbook from the series of albums produced by rocker Rod Stewart) has undergone something of an off-air revival, with artists such as Stewart, Tony Bennett and Queen Latifah putting their own interpretation on the music.

During the mid-to-late-1990s, the "Mix" format—a loosely defined mixture of Top-40 and classic rock with something of an emphasis on adult contemporary music—began to appear across the country. While the format has no particular standard identity, most "mix" stations have rotations consisting largely of pop and rock music from the 1980s and 1990s (and often the 1970s), with some current material mixed in. In addition, stations devoted to the pop music of the 1970s, 1980s, and 1990s on their own have developed as the audiences that grew up with that music grew older and nostalgic for the sounds of their youth. The continued play of such songs on such stations has also exposed the music to younger generations that can take a renewed interest in the music, prolonging its shelf life beyond what conventional wisdom in the industry may suggest.

The full service format is a more freeform variant of this type of format. Full-service stations will often mix the oldies, classic rock, classic hits, and adult standards music, occasionally with music found in formats such as beautiful music, adult contemporary, or classic country. On weekends, specialty or niche programs focusing on formats such as Celtic music, polka and Italian music (depending on the ethnicity of the area) are common. In addition to music, a limited amount of local talk programming is heard on most full-service stations. Full service tends to be heard primarily on rural stations.

=== Classical, pop, easy-listening, jazz, dance ===
These formats all have small but very loyal audiences in the largest markets. Most follow formats similar to the above (Top 40s, Freeform, AOR and Oldies), except with a different playlist. Public service stations following these formats tend to be "freeform" stations.

=== Regional Mexican ===
Regional Mexican is a Latin music radio format, typically including Banda, Conjunto, Corridos, Duranguense, Grupero, Huapango, Mariachi, New Mexico music, Norteña, Ranchera, and Tejano music. It is the most popular radio format targeting Hispanic Americans in the United States.[2] The large number of immigrants from Northern Mexico can lead to an emphasis upon Norteña on Regional Mexican radio stations,[1] though markets with larger Hispanic audiences can have multiple Regional Mexican stations, with variations in which region from which the music is taken and where it is popular.

=== Easy listening ===
Easy listening and adult contemporary are related formats that play largely down-tempo pop music of various styles. The difference is mostly in the era and styles covered -- Easy Listening is mostly older music done in the style of standards from the early 20th century (typical artists include Johnny Mathis and Frank Sinatra) combined with Big Band music and more modern performers in the same style such as Céline Dion and Josh Groban, while Adult Contemporary focuses more on newer pop music from the 1970s on. An ancestor to the easy listening format is Beautiful Music, a now-rare format (though XM features one channel of it, called Sunny) focusing mostly on smooth jazz or classical arrangements of pop music and original compositions in a similar vein. Perhaps the best-known Adult Contemporary station currently in operation is WLTW in New York City, better known as 106.7 Lite FM. Hot adult contemporary is a hybrid format that crosses adult contemporary with top-40.

Jazz stations generally play either traditional jazz forms or smooth jazz. The jazz station, more than any other except the college station, is stereotyped as having a small listenership and a somewhat overly highbrow on-air personality, and many are college-run stations. California State University Long Beach sponsors KJAZZ 88.1, which has a fairly significant online listenership as well. Two very well known smooth jazz stations are WNUA in Chicago and 94.7 The Wave in Los Angeles, both of which were introduced in 1987, and still continue to enjoy tremendous success in the format today. Also, WUCF-FM in Orlando has been playing jazz music since 1978. Both traditional and smooth jazz stations have been in severe decline, both on commercial and noncommercial stations, since the 2000s, in part because of the formats' lower profitability compared to other formats (adult contemporary for commercial stations, NPR-driven news/talk for noncommercial ones).

Blues programming is generally limited to niche programs on stations that primarily broadcast other formats. An exception to this is CIDG-FM, an all-blues station based in the Canadian city of Ottawa.

Dance music is a niche, and so-called "rhythmic pop" stations have had a fierce but not always commercially sustainable following. There was a wide spectrum of disco-format radio stations during the late 1970s, but virtually all of them died out during the disco backlash; WXKS in Boston is one of the few notable survivors, now a Clear Channel Communications-owned top-40 station of considerable influence. Nevertheless, there are a large number of dance music stations available both on the internet and on satellite radio, mostly specializing in various forms of electronica. Both major US satellite radio services include disco stations.

=== Alternative and modern rock ===
Rock music has a long and honorable radio tradition going back to DJs like Wolfman Jack and Alan Freed, and as a result variations on rock radio are fairly common. The classic rock and oldies formats are discussed above; in addition to those, however, there are several genres of music radio devoted to different aspects of modern rock music. Alternative rock grew out of the grunge scene of the late 1980s and early 1990s and is particularly favored by college radio and adult album alternative stations; there is a strong focus on songwriters and bands with an outsider sound or a more sophisticated sound than the "three chord wonder" cliché. Meanwhile, other stations focus on heavy metal, punk rock, or the various post-punk and pop-influenced sounds known collectively as "modern rock".

Narrow-interest rock stations are particularly common on the Internet and satellite radio scenes, broken down into genres such as punk, metal, classic rock, indie music, and the like. There is a general feeling among radio connoisseurs that rock radio is becoming badly watered down by big corporate ownership, leading to a considerable do-it-yourself spirit.

=== Country ===
While stereotyped as rural music, the Country music format is common and popular throughout the United States and in some other countries (particularly Canada and Australia, both of which share much of the same Anglo-Saxon and Celtic roots as the United States). Country has been a popular radio format since the early days of music radio, dating back to the early days of radio itself when barn dance radio programs were widely popular; however, the format was indeed originally a predominantly rural phenomenon, especially on AM radio. Decades worth of efforts at mainstreaming the format eventually paid off when country radio became widely popular among a large number of FM radio stations that signed on in the suburban United States in the 1980s and early 1990s.

For most mainstream country stations, the emphasis is generally on current pop country, following the same process as top 40; the remaining music in a particular station's library generally uses music from the past fifteen years (shorter for "hot country" or "new country" stations), with the exact music used varying depending on the station and the style of music the listener wants to hear.

Classic country is a variant of the country music format; it is effectively the country music analog to oldies. Classic country is generally preserved in the rural AM stations that country music aired on before its mainstream expansion. Depending on the music mix, it can play either relatively recent classic country tunes from the 1970s to the 1990s (generally more favorable to advertisers) or can span all the way back to the 1920s, thus playing music far older than almost any other radio format available.

Due to increasing similarities between country music and some variants of rock music (such as southern rock, country rock and heartland rock), there have been efforts at combining country and rock formats together, most of which have been unsuccessful.

An alternative country format is Americana, which eschews the mainstream pop country songs in favor of classic-era, alt country and cult musicians. Like the music it plays, these stations can develop strong cult followings and listener loyalty, but they are also less commercially successful than pop country stations.

=== Urban (hip-hop/R&B) ===
The explosive rise in popularity during the 1980s of rap music has led to a large number of radio stations specializing in rap/hip-hop and R&B music (with the exception of classic R&B such as Motown, which is as often as not the province of Oldies stations). This format is popular among all ethnic groups and social classes.

=== Dance music radio ===
Dance music radio focuses on live DJ sets and hit singles from genres of techno, house, electro, drum and bass, UK garage and big beat. While some stations play all kinds of electronic dance music, others (mainly pirate radio stations) focus on particular genres. This format is popular in England, Germany, Netherlands and some other countries, but less so in the United States (where dance is a niche format often exclusive to internet radio stations).

However, the number of U.S. stations airing such content has grown; five terrestrial radio stations in the U.S. with a purely dance-oriented format (one of which airing it part-time during the night and early-morning hours) report their airplay to the Billboard Dance/Mix Show Airplay chart, while top 40 and rhythmic stations may also air EDM songs that have crossed over onto pop-oriented charts due to the recent growth in mainstream popularity of dance music.

=== Christian and gospel music ===
Christian and gospel radio stations usually plays the popular Contemporary Christian music, others playing Gospel music and/or Praise and worship. K-Love and Air1 are among the most popular Christian radio stations. In the United States, Christian music stations (especially ostensibly noncommercial ones) often rely heavily on brokered programming: a Christian music station typically only carries music for part of the day, with the rest of the day filled by evangelists who pay to place recordings of their sermons on the station.

== Public, commercial and community radio ==
=== Public radio formats ===
Some music radio is broadcast by public service organizations, such as National Public Radio or the BBC. In the United States, public radio is typically confined to three formats: news/talk, classical music, or jazz, the last of which is declining rapidly as of the late 2000s. In other countries, where national broadcasters hold significantly more clout, formats can vary more widely.

=== Community radio ===
Community radio often relies heavily on the music format because it is relatively cheap and generally makes for easy listening.

=== Commercial radio ===
Commercial stations charge advertisers for the estimated number of listeners. The larger the audience, the higher the stations' rate card can be for commercial advertising.

Commercial stations program the format of the station to gain as large a slice of the demographic audience as possible.

A station's value is usually measured as a percentage of market share in a market of a certain size. The measurement in U.S. markets has historically been by Arbitron, a commercial statistical service that uses listener diaries. Arbitron diaries were historically collected on Thursdays, and for this reason, most radio stations have run special promotions on Thursdays, hoping to persuade last-minute Arbitron diarists to give them a larger market-share. Stations are contractually prohibited from mentioning Arbitron on the air.

Market share is not always a consideration, because not all radio stations are commercial. Public radio is funded by government and private donors. Since most public broadcasting operations do not have to make a profit, no commercials are necessary. (In fact, because most public broadcasting stations operate under noncommercial licenses from their country's broadcasting regulator, they may not be allowed to sell advertising at all.) Underwriting spots, which mention the name of a sponsor and some information but cannot include "calls to action" attempting to convince the listener to patronize the sponsor, may be allowed.

Also, satellite radio either charges subscribers or is operated by a public broadcasting service. Therefore, satellite radio rarely carries commercials or tries to raise money from donors. The lack of commercial interruptions in satellite radio is an important advantage. Often the only breaks in a satellite music station's programming are for station identification and DJ introductions.

Internet radio stations exist that follow all of these plans.

Much early commercial radio was completely freeform; this changed drastically with the payola scandals of the 1950s. As a result, DJs seldom have complete programming freedom. Occasionally a special situation or highly respected, long established personality is given such freedom. Most programming is done by the program director. Program directors may work for the station or at a central location run by a corporate network. The DJ's function is generally reduced to introducing and playing songs. Many stations target younger listeners, because advertisers believe that advertising can change a younger person's product choice. Older people are thought to be less easy to change.

Music radio has several possible arrangements. Originally, it had blocks of sponsored airtime that played music from a live orchestra. In the 1930s, phonograph records, especially the single, let a disc jockey introduce individual songs, or introduce blocks of songs. Since then, the program has been arranged so that commercials are followed by the content that is most valuable to the audience.

Programming is different for non-traditional broadcasting. The Jack FM format eliminates DJs entirely, as do many internet radio stations. The music is simply played. If it is announced, it is by RDS (for FM broadcast) or ID3 tags (for Internet broadcast). Satellite radio usually uses DJs, but their programming blocks are longer and not distinguished much by the time of day. In addition, receivers usually display song titles, so announcing them is not needed.

Internet and satellite broadcasting are not considered public media, so treaties and statutes concerning obscenity, transmission of ciphers and public order do not apply to those formats. So, satellite and internet radio are free to provide sexually explicit, coarse and political material. Typical providers include Playboy Radio, uncensored rap and hard rock stations, and "outlaw" country music stations.

The wide reach and selective, non-broadcast usage of the internet allows programmers access to special interest audiences. As a result, both mainstream and narrow-interest webcasts flourish; in particular, electronic music stations are much more common on the Internet than they are in satellite or broadcast media.

== Regional differences ==
Outside of English-speaking world, several radio formats built around local musical genres are popular. Examples include Portuguese Fado, Spanish-speaking Mexican Regional, Reggaeton and tejano, French Cajun (especially in French Louisiana), Russian Shanson, and (since the late 2000s) Korean K-pop.

== Cost of programming ==
Stations usually adopt a music format to gain the greatest number of listeners for the least expense. Since the content has already been produced, the station merely adds the low-cost on-air programming between records.

Music radio stations pay music-licensing fees to licensing agencies such as ASCAP and BMI in the United States or PRS in the UK. These fees or royalties are generally paid to the songwriters; the musicians themselves typically do not get a cut of radio royalties, even if they own a share of the performance rights, unless they wrote the song themselves. (Thus, a song that is in the public domain is free to play on the radio, regardless of who performs it or when it was performed.) For example, the industry-wide fees payable in 2004 to ASCAP was $176 million. Commercial stations often get their CDs free, but still pay royalties to play it on air. Some small neighborhood stations play unlisted locally produced music, and avoid these fees.

Licensing issues nearly destroyed early Internet radio. In the U.S., Congress intervened with a royalty structure that was expensive to small independent operators, but easier than the RIAA's standard scale. Both XM and Sirius provide commercial packages allowing exclusive license-free use (though not rebroadcast) of their music programming by businesses. Most popular internet radio networks such as Pandora and Digitally Imported were paying royalty fees annually to SoundExchange.

== Music radio and culture ==
Music radio, particularly top 40, has often acted as both a barometer and an arbiter of musical taste, and radio airplay is one of the defining measures of success in the mainstream musical world. In fact, the rise of rock music to popularity is intimately tied to the history of music radio. Early forms of rock had languished in poor areas of the South. It was enjoyed mostly by rural blacks, with notable exposure in Memphis, Tennessee due to the all African American programming of WDIA. Rock music entered the mainstream during the 1950s because of controversial white DJs such as Dewey Phillips, Alan Freed, Dick Clark, and Wolfman Jack with an appreciation for black music.

For many years, many listeners have been dissatisfied with the content of radio programming since the decline of early free form-rock radio. The popularity of offshore pirate radio stations in the United Kingdom was an early symptom of frustration with the often overly safe and occasionally politicized playlists of commercial radio.

The growth of Internet radio from a small experimenter's toy in the mid-1990s to a huge phenomenon allowing both small do-it-yourselfers and large commercial stations to make their offerings available worldwide was seen as a threat to over-the-air music broadcasting, and was nearly shut down by onerous licensing demands made by the recording industry. Meanwhile, the rise of satellite radio services as a major competitor has brought many of the advantages of Internet radio to an increasingly mobile listening public, including lack of censorship, greater choice, a more eclectic approach to format programming, and static-free digital sound quality. Indeed, one-size-fits-all programming is no longer seen as tenable by some, as the diversity of musical tastes among the listening public has created a proliferation of radio formats in what some might call a form of narrowcasting.

== See also ==
- Playlist
- Music scheduling system
- Audio theater
- Radio format
- List of radio programs
