= WMVO =

Radio station in Mount Vernon, Ohio

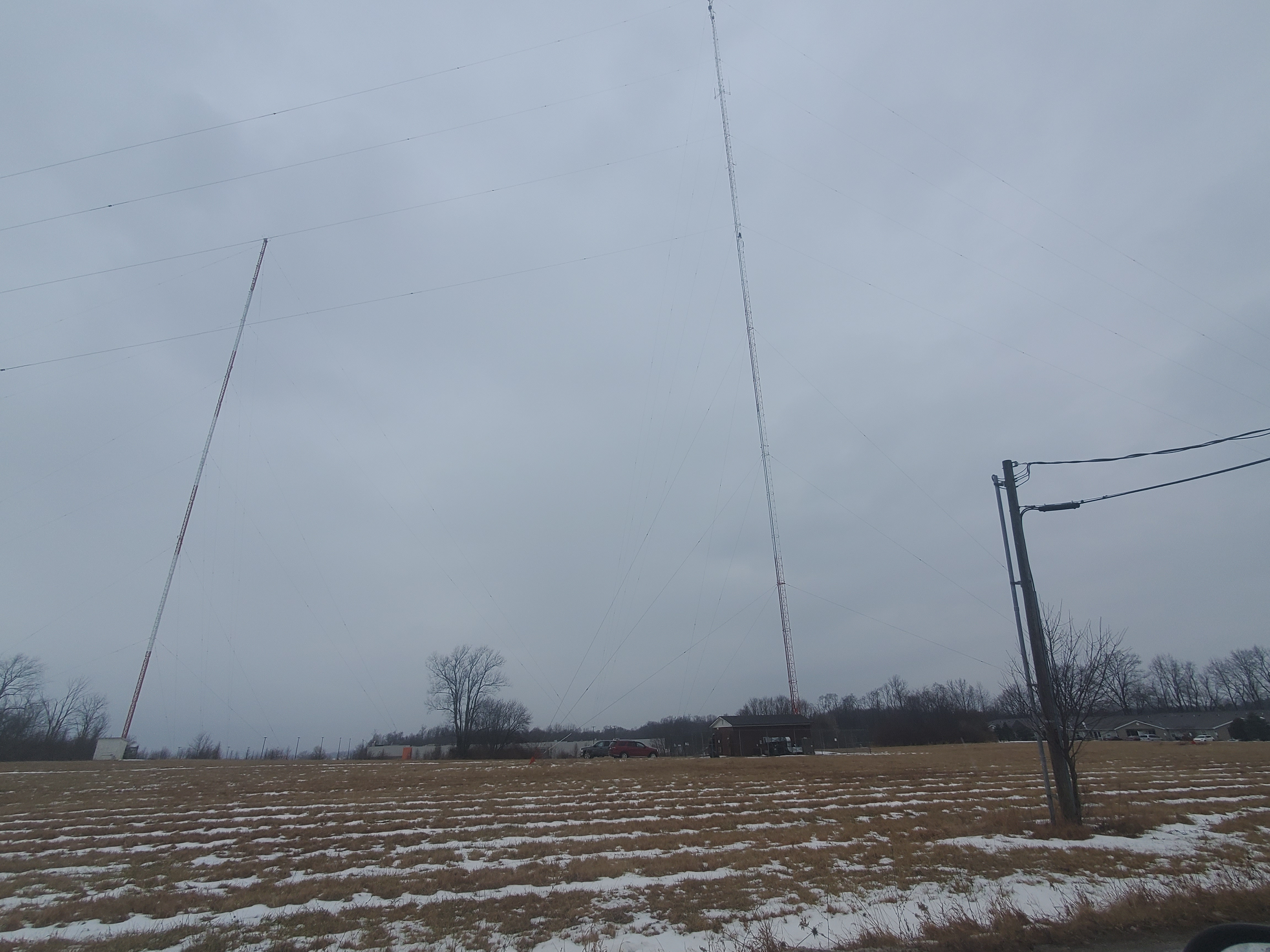
- WMVO antennas
- Mount Vernon, Ohio; United States
- Broadcast area: Mid-Ohio
- Frequency: 1300 kHz
- Branding: Oldies WMVO

Programming
- Language: English
- Format: Defunct (formerly Oldies; Talk; Sports)
- Affiliations: ABC News Radio; Cincinnati Bengals Radio Network; Cleveland Guardians Radio Network; Ohio State Sports Network; Westwood One

Ownership
- Owner: BAS Broadcasting
- Sister stations: WQIO

History
- First air date: 1953; 73 years ago
- Call sign meaning: Mount Vernon, Ohio

Technical information
- Licensing authority: FCC
- Facility ID: 74474
- Class: D
- Power: 410 watts (daytime); 51 watts (nighttime)
- Transmitter coordinates: 40°24′17.00″N 82°26′23.00″W
- Translator: 100.9 W265DJ (Mount Vernon)

Links
- Public license information: Public file; LMS
- Webcast: Listen live
- Website: www.wmvo.com

WMVO (1300 AM) – branded as "Oldies WMVO" – was a commercial oldies radio station licensed to serve Mount Vernon, Ohio. It also operated a translator signal on 100.9 MHz at the same landmark site: "Radio Hill" (at the intersection of Coshocton Avenue and Upper Gilchrist Road). The station was a full-service oldies station that also featured assorted talk and sports programming. WMVO was also an ABC News Radio affiliate.

WMVO and its FM sister station WQIO were owned by BAS Broadcasting of Fremont, Ohio. Prior to October 1, 2005, the station was owned by Clear Channel Communications. WMVO has maintained its local presence for much of the station's history, with an additional news presence on WQIO.

WMVO was affiliated with the Cleveland Guardians, Cleveland Cavaliers, Ohio State Buckeyes and the Mount Vernon Yellow Jackets.

== History ==
WMVO and sister station WQIO were founded by Helen E. Zelkowitz "Mrs. Z" in 1951 and remained locally owned and operated until their sale in 1994. Ron Staats, nicknamed "The Voice of Knox County", was the 1300 WMVO OM/Program Director and host of the talk show Radioline for 37 years. Ron was an integral part of the community by serving as the announcer for the Mount Vernon Christmas Parade, master of ceremonies for the Knox County Junior Miss program, Utica Old Fashioned Ice Cream Festival and the Dogwood Blossoms Chapter Sweet Adeline's Christmas Show. Other well-known WMVO personalities included Dave 'Skip' Bevington (over 40 years) and Charlie Kilkenny. In 1982, long-time radio personality Charlie Kilkenny drove his pickup to the Public Square, where he told his listeners to meet him with food donations for the community food pantry. To this day, the measurement tool for how much food is raised for Food for the Hungry is based on the size of Charlie Kilkenny's truck.

In 1994, Ashland Broadcasting purchased the stations to pair with WNCO/WNCO-FM in nearby Ashland. The name of the company was Ohio Radio Group. Ohio Radio Group eventually became a local radio powerhouse, owning 7 stations, including WFXN-FM/102.3—Galion, Ohio, WMAN-FM/98.3—Fredericktown, Ohio and WXXF/107.7—Loudonville, Ohio. In 1996, WQEL and WBCO were added to the company based in Bucyrus, Ohio where they would become sister stations with WFXN-FM and WYNT, which was based in nearby Upper Sandusky, Ohio making Ohio Radio Group the largest radio ownership company in Ohio. By the time of the Ohio Radio Group sale in 2000, they owned 4 AM and 9 FM radio stations. Clear Channel Communications, which owned WYHT and WMAN in nearby Mansfield, Ohio, had to divest two radio stations, which is why WQEL and WBCO in Bucyrus, Ohio are now owned by Saga Communications.

In 2005, Clear Channel spun off WMVO and WQIO to BAS Broadcasting, based out of Fremont, Ohio. Following the ownership change, most of WQIO's airstaff and long-time WMVO personality Ron Staats were dismissed. WMVO has since maintained its local programming block during morning hours.

Prior to February 13, 2010, WMVO was an affiliate of ABC Radio/Citadel Media's Timeless satellite channel, which it carried during non-local programming. After that format's shutdown by Citadel, WMVO switched to a relay of The True Oldies Channel.

On May 1, 2023, the station announced that it would be turning off the signal for 1300 AM and moving the originating signal for 100.9 to a new HD Radio channel on sister station WQIO. BAS Broadcasting surrendered WMVO's license to the Federal Communications Commission for cancellation on November 13, 2023.
