= WYHT =

FM radio station in Mansfield, Ohio, US

- Mansfield, Ohio; United States
- Broadcast area: Richland County; Crawford County; Morrow County; Knox County
- Frequency: 105.3 MHz
- Branding: Y105

Programming
- Language: English
- Format: Hot adult contemporary
- Affiliations: Premiere Networks

Ownership
- Owner: iHeartMedia, Inc.; (iHM Licenses, LLC)
- Sister stations: WFXN-FM; WMAN; WMAN-FM; WNCO; WNCO-FM; WSWR; WXXF

History
- First air date: October 18, 1962
- Former call signs: WCLW-FM (1962–78); WCLW (1978–79); WCLW-FM (1979–87)
- Call sign meaning: Your Hits

Technical information
- Licensing authority: FCC
- Facility ID: 67611
- Class: B
- ERP: 50,000 watts
- HAAT: 113 meters (371 ft)
- Transmitter coordinates: 40°46′9.00″N 82°32′23.00″W

Links
- Public license information: Public file; LMS
- Webcast: Listen live (via iHeartRadio)
- Website: wyht.iheart.com

WYHT (105.3 FM) is a radio station licensed to Mansfield, Ohio, United States, the station serves the Mid-Ohio area. The station is owned by iHeartMedia, Inc.

== History ==
The station signed on October 18, 1962, as a sister to now defunct 1140 AM WCLW located at 791 McPherson Street in Mansfield, Ohio and owned by Mansfield Broadcasting Inc owned by Frederick Eckardt. Simulcasting 100% of the AM station 105.3 aired a Mainstream Rock/Pop format that was a first in the area. In 1975, the company changed names to Greater Mansfield Broadcasting Inc. having Lynn Eckardt join as vice president of the company. At that time, WCLW aired a freeform format, with each DJ airing one format, from Big band to Adult contemporary to Album-oriented rock to Top 40. In 1983, WCLW-AM would become country competing against nearby WNCO Ashland, Ohio and WCLW-FM would change to a MOR format.

Greater Mansfield Broadcasting would sell both WCLW-AM/FM to Cleveland lawyer and radio specialist Harrison Fuerst's Treasure Radio on April 16, 1987, for $2 Million. Fuerst had also owned several radio stations under the banner of Welcome Radio including 1280 KTLK Denver now KBNO (AM) and 105.1 KADX now KXKL-FM, 1490 KLNG Omaha now KIBM, 1460 WOKO Albany now WOPG (AM), 1390 KTUR Turlock/Modesto now KLOC, and 1350 WSLR Akron now WARF and sister station 96.5 WKDD. Under the newly incorporated Treasure Radio Associates, Fuerst was also purchasing WMAN (AM)/Mansfield for $1.6 Million to combine with his 1490 WMGW and 100.3 WZPR now WGYY in Meadville, Pennsylvania, 98.1 WJJR and now defunct 970 WHWB (AM) Rutland. The station changed its call letters to the current WYHT-FM on August 3, 1987.

Treasure worked with consultant Nick Anthony, who'd programmed WKDD in Akron, and who currently is Vice President of Rubber City Radio Group. When Anthony joined the station, the entire format and lineup of the newly named Y105 changed adding Scott Brunner and Toni Foxx to mornings; Steve Casale to middays; Sheri Wharton in Afternoons; David G. Cook, evenings; and Eric Taylor, overnights. Program Director for the new Y105 was John Foster and music director Bob Dickey. The music format shifted from Adult Contemporary to Contemporary Hit Radio with the call letter change as well.

After nearly a decade of ownership, Treasure Radio began divesting properties around the country including WYHT and WMAN for $7.65 Million to Faircom Communications who also owned WFNT and WCRZ in Flint. Less than one year later, Regent Communications (now Townsquare Media) purchased the entire Faircom portfolio for $32 Million. Shortly after the much anticipated Clear Channel/AMFM merger in 2000, Regent Communications announced it would swap WYHT and WMAN Mansfield, WSWR Shelby, KZXY-FM Apple Valley, KIXW (AM) Apple Valley, KIXA Lucerne Valley, KATJ-FM Victorville and KVTR Victorville plus an additional $67 Million in cash. In return Regent Communications secured new markets with both Albany and Grand Rapids.

On August 1, 2020, WYHT transitioned back to a hot adult contemporary format from Top 40 (CHR). The station kept its Y105 branding, as well as its morning show, Dave & Jimmy, until it left syndication in October 2023. As of August 2026, the station currently airs Valentine in the Morning based out of KBIG (104.3 MYfm) in Los Angeles, California.
