= WBCO =

Radio station in Bucyrus, Ohio

- Bucyrus, Ohio; United States
- Broadcast area: Mid-Ohio region
- Frequency: 1540 kHz
- Branding: WBCO 1540AM / 107.5FM

Programming
- Format: Classic country
- Affiliations: CBS News Radio; Westwood One; Agri Broadcast Network; Ohio State Sports Network

Ownership
- Owner: Saga Communications; (Franklin Communications, Inc.)
- Sister stations: WQEL

History
- First air date: 1962
- Call sign meaning: Bucyrus, Ohio

Technical information
- Licensing authority: FCC
- Facility ID: 7111
- Class: D
- Power: 500 watts day
- Transmitter coordinates: 40°45′51.00″N 82°56′5.00″W
- Translator: 107.5 W298CC (Bucyrus)

Links
- Public license information: Public file; LMS
- Webcast: Listen live
- Website: wbco.com

WBCO (1540 AM) is a radio station licensed to Bucyrus, Ohio, United States, and serving the Mid-Ohio region. Owned by Saga Communications, the station currently features a classic country format.

WBCO also airs 24 hours per day on FM translator W298CC at 107.5 FM.

== History ==
WBCO was founded in 1962 by Thomas P. Moore and wife J. LaVonne Moore, along with LaVonne's brother and pioneer in broadcasting, Orville J. Sather, and investors. WBCO was joined by sister-station WBCO-FM (later named WQEL) two years later. The company was first known as Brokensword Broadcasting Co. When the Moores and Sathers bought out the investors, it became Sa-Mor Stations. Full ownership was assumed by Tom and LaVonne following Orville's death. The stations were sold to Mike and Donna Laipply in 1991. In 1996, both stations were sold to the Ohio Radio Group based in Ashland Ohio who also owned stations WQIO and WMVO in Mount Vernon, Ohio, WNCO and WNCO-FM in Ashland, Ohio, WMAN-FM in Fredericktown, Ohio, WFXN-FM in Galion, Ohio and WXXF in Loudonville, Ohio. They would later add local WYNT in Upper Sandusky, Ohio to the group making it the largest radio ownership company in Ohio. In 2001, Ohio Radio Group was purchased by Clear Channel Communications which had to sell two stations that included WBCO and WQEL who was purchased by Scantland Broadcasting, then current Saga Communications.

On February 1, 2016, WBCO changed their format from adult standards to classic country.
