= KMPS (AM) =

Radio station in Hesperia, California

Simulcast of KXVV Victorville
- Hesperia, California; United States
- Broadcast area: Victor Valley
- Frequency: 910 kHz
- Branding: La X 103.1 y 910AM

Programming
- Format: Regional Mexican

Ownership
- Owner: El Dorado Broadcasters; (EDB VV License LLC)
- Sister stations: KATJ-FM; KIXA; KIXW; KXVV; KZXY-FM

History
- First air date: February 1, 1990; 36 years ago (as KVVQ)
- Last air date: August 2024; 1 year ago
- Former call signs: KHSP (1983–1985); KVVQ (1985–2001); KRAK (2001–2017)
- Call sign meaning: "Kountry Music Puget Sound" (call letters transferred from KSWD in Seattle, which formerly aired a country music format)

Technical information
- Licensing authority: FCC
- Facility ID: 72716
- Class: B
- Power: 700 watts day; 500 watts night
- Transmitter coordinates: 34°23′19″N 117°23′32.2″W

Links
- Public license information: Public file; LMS
- Website: lax1031.com

KMPS (910 kHz) was a commercial AM radio station licensed to Hesperia, California, and broadcast to the Victor Valley area. It was owned by El Dorado Broadcasters and simulcast a Regional Mexican radio format with KXVV (103.1 FM). KMPS's offices and studios were on Hesperia Road in Hesperia.

KMPS was powered at 700 watts by day and 500 watts at night. It used a directional antenna with a four-tower array. The transmitter was near Mesa Linda Street in Oak Hills.

The station went on the air in 1990 as KVVQ, a middle of the road music and talk. Infinity Broadcasting renamed the station KRAK in 2001; it would feature adult standards until 2011. From then until 2019, it was a sports radio station, carrying ESPN Radio until the launch of CBS Sports Radio in 2013; it became KMPS after CBS Radio was acquired by Entercom in 2017. Following El Dorado Broadcasters' acquisition of the station in 2019, KMPS went silent for a year, resumed operations as a KXVV simulcast in 2020, and was closed down in 2024.

== History ==
The station signed on the air on February 1, 1990, as KVVQ. Initially, it broadcast middle of the road music and talk programming. On February 19, 2001, then-owner Infinity Broadcasting changed the call letters to KRAK. That call sign was formerly used by a well-known 50,000 watt country music station in Sacramento, which is now KHTK. On July 31, 2008, CBS Radio announced plans to sell its mid-size and small market stations (including KRAK) to focus more on major market clusters. However, such a sale was never consummated.

On November 15, 2011, KRAK changed its format from adult standards, branded "Stardust 910", to all-sports, branded as "910 ESPN". The previous ESPN Radio affiliate in the region, KVFG, began stunting with Christmas music, then switched to a classic hits format.

In September 2012, KRAK began a transition to CBS Sports Radio with hourly updates. The station dropped ESPN Radio and began 24-hour broadcasts of CBS Sports Radio on January 2, 2013. KMPS carried Los Angeles Angels baseball games until 2019.

On February 2, 2017, CBS Radio announced it would merge with Entercom. The merger was approved on November 9, 2017, and was consummated on November 17. On December 11, 2017, the station took on the KMPS call sign. Those call letters had been transferred from Seattle sister station KSWD.

On May 6, 2019, Entercom sold KMPS and KVFG to El Dorado Broadcasters for $1 million. The sale was completed on August 15. Afterwards, KMPS went silent due to financial reasons. Around August 2020, KMPS returned to the air with a simulcast of the regional Mexican format of KXVV (the former KVFG).

El Dorado Broadcasting surrendered the KMPS license in August 2024. The Federal Communications Commission would cancel it on August 15, 2024.
