= Ohio State Sports Network =

Regional play-by-play radio network

The Ohio State Sports Network from Learfield
- Type: Radio network
- Country: United States
- Availability: Ohio; West Virginia (limited)
- Headquarters: Columbus, Ohio
- Owner: IMG College
- Affiliations: Ohio State Buckeyes; Tegna, Inc.
- Affiliates: 62, including 2 flagships
- Official website: ohiostatebuckeyes.com/sportsnetwork/

The Ohio State Sports Network from Learfield is an American radio network consisting of 62 radio stations which carry coverage of Ohio State Buckeyes football and men's basketball. Co-owned WBNS (1460 AM) and WBNS-FM (97.1 FM), both licensed to Columbus, Ohio, serve as the network's two flagship stations. The network also includes 60 affiliates in the U.S. states of Ohio and West Virginia: 33 AM stations, 22 of which extend their signals with low-power FM translators; 26 full-power FM stations; and one HD Radio digital subchannel which supplements its signal with a low-power FM translator.

Paul Keels has served as play-by-play announcer for both football and men's basketball since 1998; former Ohio State offensive guard Jim Lachey currently serves as color analyst for football; and former Ohio State point guard Ron Stokes currently serves as color analyst for men's basketball.

== History ==
In 2009, Ohio State announced it had sold its athletic program's media rights to IMG College and RadiOhio, Inc. (member of the Dispatch Broadcasting Group and then-owner of longtime network flagships WBNS and WBNS-FM); the "lucrative multiyear deal" was reportedly worth $110 million, and scheduled to last through 2019. At the time of the announcement, athletic director Gene Smith said Ohio State athletics would be in a better position to confront the then-ongoing economic downturn, referencing an unexpected $1.2 million deficit.

On December 31, 2018, Learfield Communications, Inc., and IMG College merged and formed a new company, Learfield IMG College.

== Programming ==
Besides gameday coverage, network programming includes:

- Buckeye Roundtable, a two-hour weekly discussion on Buckeyes football, airs Monday evenings.
- The Ryan Day Call-In Show, a weekly season-long update with the football head coach, airs Thursdays at 12pm noon.

== Station list ==
Callsign	Frequency	Band	City	State	Network status
WBNS	1460	AM	Columbus	Ohio	Flagship
WBNS-FM	97.1	FM	Columbus	Ohio	Flagship
WAKR	1590	AM	Akron	Ohio	Affiliate
W228EL	93.5	FM	Akron	Ohio	WAKR relay
WMTR-FM	96.1	FM	Archbold	Ohio	Football only
WREO-FM	97.1	FM	Ashtabula	Ohio	Affiliate
WATH	970	AM	Athens	Ohio	Affiliate
W247DR	97.3	FM	Athens	Ohio	WATH relay
WLYV	1290	AM	Bellaire	Ohio	Affiliate
WPKO-FM	98.3	FM	Bellefontaine	Ohio	Football only
WBCO	1540	AM	Bucyrus	Ohio	Affiliate
W298CC	107.5	FM	Bucyrus	Ohio	WBCO relay
WQEL	92.7	FM	Bucyrus	Ohio	Affiliate
WILE-FM	97.7	FM	Cambridge	Ohio	Affiliate
WHBC	1480	AM	Canton	Ohio	Affiliate
WCSM	1350	AM	Celina	Ohio	Affiliate
W262DC	100.3	FM	Celina	Ohio	WCSM relay
WCSM-FM	96.7	FM	Celina	Ohio	Affiliate
WDJO	1480	AM	Cincinnati	Ohio	Affiliate
W237FL	95.3	FM	Cincinnati	Ohio	WDJO relay
W258CI	99.5	FM	Cincinnati	Ohio	WDJO relay
W300CI	107.9	FM	Cincinnati	Ohio	WDJO relay
W270DW	101.9	FM	Circleville	Ohio	WLOH relay
WKNR	850	AM	Cleveland	Ohio	Affiliate
WTNS-FM	99.3	FM	Coshocton	Ohio	Affiliate
WING	1410	AM	Dayton	Ohio	Affiliate
WGTZ	92.9	FM	Dayton	Ohio	Football only
WJER	1450	AM	Dover–New Phila.	Ohio	Affiliate
W265DL	100.9	FM	Dover–New Phila.	Ohio	WJER relay
WFIN	1330	AM	Findlay	Ohio	Affiliate
W238CX	95.5	FM	Findlay	Ohio	WFIN relay
WFOB	1430	AM	Fostoria	Ohio	Affiliate
W289CP	105.7	FM	Fostoria	Ohio	WFOB relay
WMAN-FM	98.3	FM	Fredericktown	Ohio	Affiliate
WOHF	92.1	FM	Fremont	Ohio	Affiliate
WRAC	103.1	FM	Georgetown	Ohio	Affiliate
WVNU	97.5	FM	Greenfield	Ohio	Affiliate
WYRO	98.7	FM	Jackson	Ohio	Affiliate
WZWB	1420	AM	Kenova–Huntington	West Virginia	Affiliate
WKTN	95.3	FM	Kenton	Ohio	Football only
WLOH	1320	AM	Lancaster	Ohio	Affiliate
W283BO	104.5	FM	Lancaster	Ohio	WLOH relay
WIMA	1150	AM	Lima	Ohio	Affiliate
W257EQ	99.3	FM	Logan	Ohio	WLOH relay
WMAN	1400	AM	Mansfield	Ohio	Affiliate
WMOA	1490	AM	Marietta	Ohio	Affiliate
W267CQ	101.3	FM	Marietta	Ohio	WMOA relay
WMRN	1490	AM	Marion	Ohio	Affiliate
WDLR	1270	AM	Marysville	Ohio	Football only
W244DV	96.7	FM	Marysville	Ohio	WDLR relay
WJAW-FM	100.9	FM	McConnelsville	Ohio	Affiliate
WKLM	95.3	FM	Millersburg	Ohio	Football only
WQIO-HD2*	93.7-2	FM	Mount Vernon	Ohio	Affiliate
W265DJ	100.9	FM	Mount Vernon	Ohio	WQIO-HD2 relay
WNDH	103.1	FM	Napoleon	Ohio	Affiliate
WXCR	92.3	FM	New Martinsville	West Virginia	Affiliate
WCLT	1430	AM	Newark	Ohio	Affiliate
W254CT	98.7	FM	Newark	Ohio	WCLT relay
WLKR-FM	95.3	FM	Norwalk	Ohio	Affiliate
WOBL	1320	AM	Oberlin	Ohio	Affiliate
W299CJ	107.7	FM	Oberlin	Ohio	WOBL relay
WKSD	99.7	FM	Paulding	Ohio	Affiliate
WPTW	1570	AM	Piqua	Ohio	Affiliate
W251BC	98.1	FM	Piqua	Ohio	WPTW relay
WNXT	1260	AM	Portsmouth	Ohio	Affiliate
W239CQ	95.7	FM	Portsmouth	Ohio	WNXT relay
WJEH-FM	93.1	FM	Racine	Ohio	Affiliate
WMOV	1360	AM	Ravenswood	West Virginia	Affiliate
W228DJ	93.5	FM	Ravenswood	West Virginia	WMOV relay
W295DM	106.9	FM	Point Pleasant	West Virginia	WMOV relay
WLEC	1450	AM	Sandusky	Ohio	Affiliate
W228EN	93.5	FM	Sandusky	Ohio	WLEC relay
WMVR-FM	105.5	FM	Sidney	Ohio	Affiliate
W275CT	102.9	FM	Somerset	Ohio	WLOH relay
WCDK	106.3	FM	Steubenville	Ohio	Football only
WQQO-HD2*	105.5-2	FM	Sylvania	Ohio	Affiliate
W264AK	100.7	FM	Toledo	Ohio	WQQO-HD2 relay
WBTC	1540	AM	Uhrichsville	Ohio	Affiliate
W270CI	101.9	FM	Uhrichsville	Ohio	WBTC relay
WYNT	95.9	FM	Upper Sandusky	Ohio	Affiliate
WERT	1220	AM	Van Wert	Ohio	Affiliate
W282CF	104.3	FM	Van Wert	Ohio	WERT relay
WXIZ	100.9	FM	Waverly	Ohio	Football only
W261DH	100.1	FM	Wheeling	West Virginia	WLYV relay
WNIO	1390	AM	Youngstown	Ohio	Affiliate
WHIZ	1240	AM	Zanesville	Ohio	Affiliate
W272EE	102.3	FM	Zanesville	Ohio	WHIZ relay

- Asterisk (*) indicates HD Radio broadcast.
- Blue background indicates low-power FM translator.

=== Network map(s) ===
Ohio State Sports Network stations. Click on each marker to reveal details.; Flagship stations; Affiliates (including translators); Football-only affiliates
