= KRSX =

KRSX may refer to:

- KRSX (FM), a radio station (95.9 FM) licensed to serve Goldendale, Washington, United States
- KLXB, a radio station (105.1 FM) licensed to serve North Shore, California, United States, which held the call sign KRSX-FM from 2003 to 2014
- KVTR, a radio station (1590 AM) licensed to serve Victorville, California, which held the call sign KRSX from 2003 to 2013
