= Y102 =

Y102 may refer to:

- WHHY-FM, a radio station nicknamed "Y102" in Montgomery, Alabama, U.S.
- WRFY-FM, a radio station nicknamed "Y102" in Reading, Pennsylvania, U.S.
- KRNY, a radio station nicknamed "Y102" in Kearney, Nebraska, U.S.
- KYYT, a radio station nicknamed "Y102" in Goldendale, Washington, U.S.
- WYBR, a radio station nicknamed "Y102" in Big Rapids, Michigan, U.S.
- WBWL-FM, a radio station formerly nicknamed "Y102" in Lynn, Massachusetts, U.S.
- KKYR-FM, a radio station formerly nicknamed "Y102" in Texarkana, Texas, U.S.
- KZXY-FM, a radio station nicknamed "Y102" in Victorville, California, U.S.
- Yttrium-102 (Y-102 or ^{102}Y), an isotope of yttrium
