= WNCO =

WNCO may refer to:

- WNCO (AM), a radio station (1340 AM) licensed to Ashland, Ohio, United States
- WNCO-FM, a radio station (101.3 FM) licensed to Ashland, Ohio, United States
- WNCO.COM, a domain used by Southwest Airlines (WN)
