= WTNS =

WTNS may refer to:

- WTNS (AM), a radio station (1560 AM) licensed to Coshocton, Ohio, United States
- WTNS-FM, a radio station (99.3 FM) licensed to Coshocton, Ohio, United States
