= WSWR (FM) =

Radio station in Shelby, Ohio

- Shelby, Ohio; United States
- Broadcast area: Richland County; Crawford County; Morrow County
- Frequency: 100.1 MHz (HD Radio)
- Branding: My 100.1

Programming
- Language: English
- Format: Classic hits
- Affiliations: Premiere Networks

Ownership
- Owner: iHeartMedia; (iHM Licenses, LLC)
- Sister stations: WFXN-FM; WMAN; WMAN-FM; WNCO; WNCO-FM; WXXF; WYHT

History
- First air date: December 1, 1981
- Former call signs: WSWR (1981–2011); WMAN-FM (2011–12)

Technical information
- Licensing authority: FCC
- Facility ID: 66247
- Class: A
- ERP: 3,000 watts
- HAAT: 91 meters (299 ft)
- Transmitter coordinates: 40°56′42.00″N 82°39′42.00″W

Links
- Public license information: Public file; LMS
- Webcast: Listen live (via iHeartRadio)
- Website: my100fm.iheart.com

WSWR (100.1 MHz) is an FM radio station broadcasting a classic hits format as "My 100.1." Licensed to Shelby, Ohio, WSWR serves the Mid-Ohio area. The station is owned by iHeartMedia.

WSWR originated as a stand-alone signal targeting the Mansfield/Ashland area as "WSWR Wizard 100" with its own DJ's and unique oldies then becoming "Crusin' 100," airing a more standard oldies format before segueing to classic hits as "My 100.1." From January 2010 until December 26, 2011, the station was simulcast on WXXR (which previously simulcast WFXN-FM) as "My 100.1/98.3", before dropping their classic hits format in favor of a simulcast of WMAN, with both stations taking the WMAN-FM and WWMM calls, respectively.

Previous logo

On May 3, 2012, WMAN-FM split from its simulcast and began stunting towards going back to its previous classic hits format. Following an on-air apology by regional market manager Keith Kennedy, the station officially reverted to classic hits as "My 100.1," once again claiming the WSWR calls.

== History ==
WSWR-FM signed on December 1, 1981 under the ownership of Petroleum V. Nasby Corporation with studios located at 47 East Main Street in downtown Shelby.

The station moved to Mansfield when it was purchased by Joel Fairman of Faircom Inc. who owned WMAN (AM) and WYHT. Faircom purchased WSWR-FM for $1.125 Million and moved the studios. Faircom was purchased by Regent Communications of Mansfield only a few months later in 1997 as part of a group acquisition for $32 Million Dollars and included WFNT and WCRZ in Flint, and WWBN in Tuscola both in Michigan.

Shortly after the much anticipated Clear Channel/AMFM merger in 2000, Regent Communications announced it would swap WYHT and WMAN Mansfield, WSWR Shelby, KZXY-FM Apple Valley, KIXW (AM) Apple Valley, KIXA Lucerne Valley, KATJ-FM Victorville and KVTR Victorville plus an additional $67 Million in cash. In return Regent Communications secured new markets with both Albany and Grand Rapids
