= WMAN =

WMAN may refer to:

- WMAN (AM), a radio station (1400 AM) licensed to Mansfield, Ohio, USA
- WMAN-FM, a radio station (100.1 FM) licensed to Shelby, Ohio, USA
- WYTS, a radio station (1230 AM) licensed to Columbus, Ohio, USA, which held the call sign WMAN from 1922 to 1930
- IEEE 802.16, the group preparing formal specifications for Wireless Metropolitan Area Networks
