= WSWR =

WSWR may refer to:

- WSWR (FM), a radio station based in Shelby, Ohio, USA (known as WMAN-FM from December 2011 until May 2012)
- Wilts, Somerset and Weymouth Railway, a former railway company in the West Country of England.
