= Zelkowitz =

Zelkowitz is a surname.

- Helen Zelkowitz (1911–2006), American broadcaster
- Marvin Zelkowitz, American computer scientist
- 17801 Zelkowitz, minor planet named for Rachel Lauren Zelkowitz
- Goldie Zelkowitz, a 1974 album by Genya Ravan
