= WBTC =

WBTC may refer to:

- WBTC (AM), a radio station in Uhrichsville, Ohio, United States
- WBTC, "wrapped" Bitcoin in the Ethereum blockchain
- West Bengal Transport Corporation, a state government corporation
- West Bengal Trinamool Congress, a region level political party in India
