= KRAK =

KRAK may refer to:

- KRAK (FM), a radio station (102.1 FM) licensed to Anchorage, Alaska, United States
- KMPS (AM), a radio station (910 AM) formerly licensed to Hesperia, California, United States, which held the call sign KRAK from 2001 to 2017
- KIID, a radio station (1470 AM) licensed to Sacramento, California, which held the call sign KRAK from 1999 to 2001
- KYRV, a radio station (93.7 FM) licensed to Roseville, California, which held the call sign KRAK from 1998 to 1999
- KRXQ, a radio station (98.5 FM) licensed to Sacramento, California, which held the call signs KRAK and KRAK-FM from 1994 to 1998
- KNCI, a radio station (105.1 FM) licensed to Sacramento, California, which held the call sign KRAK-FM from 1985 to 1994
- KHTK, a radio station (1140 AM) licensed to Sacramento, California, which held the call sign KRAK from 1957 to 1994
