= KLCK =

KLCK may refer to:

- KLCK (AM), a radio station (1400 AM) licensed to serve Goldendale, Washington, United States
- KPNW-FM, a radio station (98.9 FM) licensed to serve Seattle, Washington, which held the call sign KLCK-FM from 2011 to 2016
- Rickenbacker International Airport, Columbus, Ohio (ICAO airport code LCK)
