= WKLM =

Radio station in Millersburg, Ohio

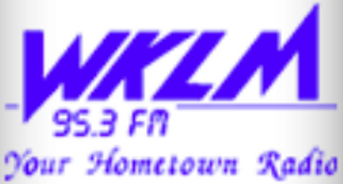
- Millersburg, Ohio; United States
- Broadcast area: New Philadelphia, Ohio; Dover, Ohio; Coshocton, Ohio
- Frequency: 95.3 MHz
- Branding: WKLM 95.3 FM

Programming
- Format: Adult contemporary
- Affiliations: Ohio State Sports Network Cleveland Browns Radio Network

Ownership
- Owner: WKLM Radio, Inc.

History
- First air date: 1988

Technical information
- Licensing authority: FCC
- Facility ID: 73178
- Class: A
- ERP: 3,000 watts
- HAAT: 100 meters (330 ft)
- Transmitter coordinates: 40.486°N 81.846°W

Links
- Public license information: Public file; LMS
- Website: www.wklmfm.com

WKLM is a commercial FM radio station in Millersburg, Ohio, United States, broadcasting on 95.3 MHz with an adult contemporary music format. Much of their broadcasts center on local news in Holmes County. They also carry all of the West Holmes Knights football games and many West Holmes and Hiland basketball games. In addition to their coverage of West Holmes Knights and Hiland Hawks athletic coverage, WKLM also carries select games Garaway Pirates, Waynedale Golden Bears, and Triway Titans games on their airwaves and YouTube channel. WKLM also carries Ohio State Buckeyes football from the Ohio State Sports Network. Beginning in 2024, they became an affiliate of the Cleveland Browns Radio Network.

The station is owned and operated by WKLM Radio, Inc., headed by Bruce Wallace of Coshocton, who also owns WTNS and WTNS-FM there. The station signs off at midnight, and signs back onto the air between 5 and 5:30a.m. daily.

WKLM hit the airwaves on August 15, 1988, at 5:00 a.m. The original owner was Graphic Publications, Inc., publisher of The Bargain Hunter, founded by Abe and Fran Mast in 1973. WKLM hired Kim Kellogg as the first general manager. Skip Randolf was the first program director, Brad Shupe the first sports director and Lorin Miller the first news director. Other original on-air talent included Ron Strong (currently OM/PD WCLT AM/FM Newark), Skip Randolf, Brad Shupe, David Hintz, Kathy Linn, Alan Reed, Brett Swinderman and Mike Miller.

The station's current lineup consists of Melissa Patrick in the morning, Michael Hammond in Mid-day, and Jake Sidle in the afternoon. Local athletic coverage is performed by Sports Director Matt Croy and Jake Sidle.
