= WFXN =

WFXN may refer to:

- WFXN (AM), a radio station (1230 AM) licensed to Moline, Illinois, United States
- WFXN-FM, a radio station (102.3 FM) licensed to Galion, Ohio, United States
