= WFNT =

- Flint, Michigan; United States
- Broadcast area: Central Michigan
- Frequency: 1470 kHz

Ownership
- Owner: Townsquare Media; (Townsquare Media of Flint, Inc.)
- Sister stations: WCRZ, WQUS, WRCL, WWBN

History
- First air date: 1947
- Last air date: December 31, 2023
- Former call signs: WCLC (1947–1948); WWOK (1948–1953); WKMF (1953–1993)
- Call sign meaning: Flint

Technical information
- Facility ID: 20447
- Class: B
- Power: 5,000 watts (day); 1,000 watts (night)
- Transmitter coordinates: 42°58′22.1″N 83°38′23.8″W

WFNT (1470 AM) was a commercial radio station licensed to Flint, Michigan, United States, that operated from 1947 to 2023. Last owned by Townsquare Media, it broadcast a talk format at its closure. The studios and transmitter were co-located on East Bristol Road in Burton.

The WFNT call sign is now used for a Christian station on 88.7 FM in Adrian, Michigan operated by Smile FM.

== History ==
The station first signed on the air in 1947. It broadcast at 1,000 watts day and night. Its call sign was WCLC but the next year became WWOK. It was owned by Drohlich Broadcasting, headed by Robert Drohlich, the general manager and Robert Drohlich, the program director. The studios were at 432 North Saginaw Street in Flint.

It became WKMF in 1953, owned by a radio company based in Tulsa, Oklahoma. WKMF was a country music station during most of the years using that call sign. Its slogan during the country years was "The country music capital of the north." WKMF's country format enjoyed a high level of ratings success during the 1960s and 1970s, often ranking among Flint's top five stations.

It adopted its present call letters WFNT in 1993. In the 1990s, most country music listening was switching to the FM dial, so management decided to make a change.

While owned by Faircom Broadcasting, WFNT became a talk station. Its syndicated program line-up included G. Gordon Liddy (who came to Flint and did his show live twice from the WFNT studios), Rush Limbaugh and Ken Hamblin. Local talk shows were hosted by Chris Pavelich and later Tommy McIntyre and his producer Howard "The Knife" Gillespie. Eventually, Regent Broadcasting (now Townsquare Media) acquired the station, as well as WCRZ and WWBN in Flint.

Logo as a standards station

In the early 2000s, WFNT switched to adult standards, using ABC Radio's "Stardust" (later "Timeless Classics" and "Timeless Favorites"). It also aired some local programming, including a daily shopping show and a Saturday-afternoon oldies program. Beginning in 2007, WFNT became the flagship station for the now-defunct Flint Generals minor league hockey radio broadcasts.

When Citadel Media ended the "Timeless" format in February 2010, WFNT flipped back to talk programming on February 12. It added syndicated shows from Premiere Networks, the Salem Radio Network and Fox Sports Radio. It briefly carried the comedy morning show Bob and Tom from Indianapolis.

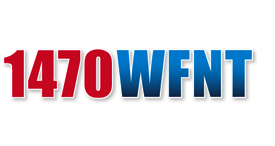
WFNT logo at the station's 2023 shutdown

On December 31, 2023, WFNT suspended operations due to economic conditions. The Federal Communications Commission cancelled the station’s license on January 2, 2025.
