= WJER =

Radio station in Dover, Ohio

- Dover–New Philadelphia, Ohio; United States
- Broadcast area: Tuscarawas County
- Frequency: 1450 kHz
- Branding: WJER

Programming
- Format: Full-service
- Affiliations: Compass Media Networks; United Stations Radio Networks; Premiere Networks

Ownership
- Owner: WTUZ Radio, Inc.; (WJER, LLC)
- Sister stations: WTUZ

History
- First air date: February 22, 1950
- Call sign meaning: Jerimiah E. Reeves, father of the first owner

Technical information
- Licensing authority: FCC
- Facility ID: 73134
- Class: C
- Power: 1,000 watts (unlimited)
- Transmitter coordinates: 40°30′46″N 81°27′25″W
- Translator: 100.9 W265DL (Dover–New Philadelphia)

Links
- Public license information: Public file; LMS
- Webcast: Listen live
- Website: wjer.com

WJER (1450 AM) is a commercial radio station licensed to the dual cities of Dover and New Philadelphia, Ohio, United States. Owned by WTUZ Radio, Inc., the station serves the Tuscarawas County area with a full-service format known as "The Voice of the Valley", and is affiliated with the Cleveland Browns, the Cleveland Guardians, the Columbus Blue Jackets and the Ohio State Buckeyes. WER's studios are located in New Philadelphia, while the transmitter resides in Dover. In addition to a standard analog transmission, WJER is relayed over low-power FM translator W265DL (100.9 FM) and is available online.

WJER first began broadcasting in 1950, and had an FM sister station WJER-FM (101.7) that operated from 1969 to 2006, which is today WHOF. The station was temporarily owned by Clear Channel Communications in a reverse LMA by owner Gary Petricola, who repurchased the AM station in 2007. In February 2016, WJER returned to the FM band with a translator operating on 100.9 MHz. Sold several times in recent years, WJER was purchased by WTUZ in 2024.

== History ==
=== Origins of WJER ===
Jeremiah E. Reeves, for which WJER is named, was a member of one of the most influential families in Tuscarawas County, starting several major industries, banks and hotels in the Dover-New Philadelphia area. After his death in 1920, the Reeves family continued the leadership traditions begun by Jeremiah.

Following World War II, the United States government saw the need to increase radio reach to citizens in rural as well as urban population centers, and many new AM stations were created. Jeremiah's daughter, Agnes (Reeves) Greer, filed for ownership of a new radio station for Dover, Ohio and was granted the license in 1949. As a tribute to her father, she requested the call letters for the station that were her father's initials, Jeremiah E. Reeves, or "JER".

On Wednesday, February 22, 1950 at 6 a.m., WJER Radio began broadcasting operations in the present studio facility at 646 Boulevard, a parcel of land that was part of the Reeves family estate. The 175-foot "original" tower was erected on land with five miles of copper wire buried beneath its surface.

WJER-FM was granted a license and began broadcasting in 1969 on 101.7. Originally, the FM station programmed "beautiful music" and was popular in doctor's offices and in elevators. As time went by WJER put more emphasis on the FM station, going "live" full-time by 1992. Both stations were locally owned by Gary Petricola until 2003, when he sold them to Clear Channel Communications. Petricola, however, continued to operate WJER-AM-FM in a reverse LMA with Clear Channel.

In 2006, Petricola's WJER Radio, LLC later repurchased the AM from Clear Channel for $200,000.

=== Relocation of the FM signal ===
On April 14, 2006, the Federal Communications Commission approved Clear Channel's request to move WJER-FM's community of license to North Canton, Ohio. The new location allowed the station to increase its power from 3,000 watts ERP to 6,000 watts ERP after the move.

In a gradual process, the stations began simulcasting for most of the broadcast day, a process which completed in December 2006.

WJER-FM signed off on December 27, and the license was transferred to North Canton, Ohio under the new callsign WHOF the next day. WJER continued to broadcast the original Dover/New Philadelphia-based programming.

Clear Channel signed on WHOF as adult contemporary-formatted "My 101.7" serving the Akron/Canton area on January 16, 2007.

Effective June 1, 2022, WJER and translator W265DL were sold to Kevin Gray's WJER, LLC for $300,000. The station was sold again in June 2024 to WTUZ Radio, Inc., owner of WTUZ, for an undisclosed amount.

== Sports ==
WJER is the local affiliate for the Cleveland Browns Radio Network, the Cleveland Guardians Radio Network, the Columbus Blue Jackets Radio Network and the Ohio State Sports Network.

== On-air personalities ==
- Eric St. John
- Rosko Roscolini
- Paul Tiratto
- Kelly Kyle
- Steve Kelly
- Michele Spring

== FM translator ==
WJER programming is relayed to an FM translator.

Broadcast translator for WJER
Call sign	Frequency	City of license	FID	ERP (W)	HAAT	Class	Transmitter coordinates	FCC info
W265DL	100.9 FM	Dover–New Philadelphia, Ohio	157042	250	108 m (354 ft)	D	40°26′19″N 81°26′0″W	LMS
