= WTUZ =

Radio station in New Philadelphia, Ohio

- Uhrichsville, Ohio; United States
- Broadcast area: Tuscarawas County
- Frequency: 99.9 MHz
- Branding: Z-Country

Programming
- Format: Country
- Affiliations: Fox News Radio; Compass Media Networks; Premiere Networks

Ownership
- Owner: WTUZ Radio, Inc.
- Sister stations: WJER

History
- First air date: May 1, 1990

Technical information
- Licensing authority: FCC
- Facility ID: 74144
- Class: A
- ERP: 5,300 watts
- HAAT: 106 meters (348 ft)
- Transmitter coordinates: 40°26′19.2″N 81°26′0.4″W

Links
- Public license information: Public file; LMS
- Webcast: Listen live
- Website: wtuz.com

WTUZ (99.9 FM) is an American radio station with studios located in New Philadelphia, Ohio, serving Tuscarawas County and surrounding counties. WTUZ's primary signal covers 965 square miles (2,500 km^{2}). The population within this primary coverage area is approximately 120,000.

The station first broadcast on Tuscarawas Valley radios on May 1, 1990. It operates 24 hours a day with a power output of 5,300 watts at 347 feet (106 meters) above average terrain at 99.9 MHz making it Tuscarawas County's most powerful station.

Known as Z-Country, the station combines today's best country music with classic country songs. WTUZ's news department reports Fox News and local news, weather and area sports.

Ed Schumacher headed a group that acquired the license for 99.9 FM in September 1989. The station continues to be locally owned with Schumacher being the principal of the corporation, serving as president and General Manager.

WTUZ is a member of the National Association of Broadcasters, the Ohio Association of Broadcasters, and the station has been accepted into the ranks of the International Broadcasters Idea Bank.

The station has twice been nominated by the National Association of Broadcasters as Small Market Station of the Year. WTUZ has also been nominated for a Crystal Award for outstanding community service in 2006 and 2009; winning the award in 2009.

WTUZ Radio was awarded the Small Market "Outstanding News Operation" for 2010 by the Ohio Associated Press Broadcasters.

== Coverage area ==
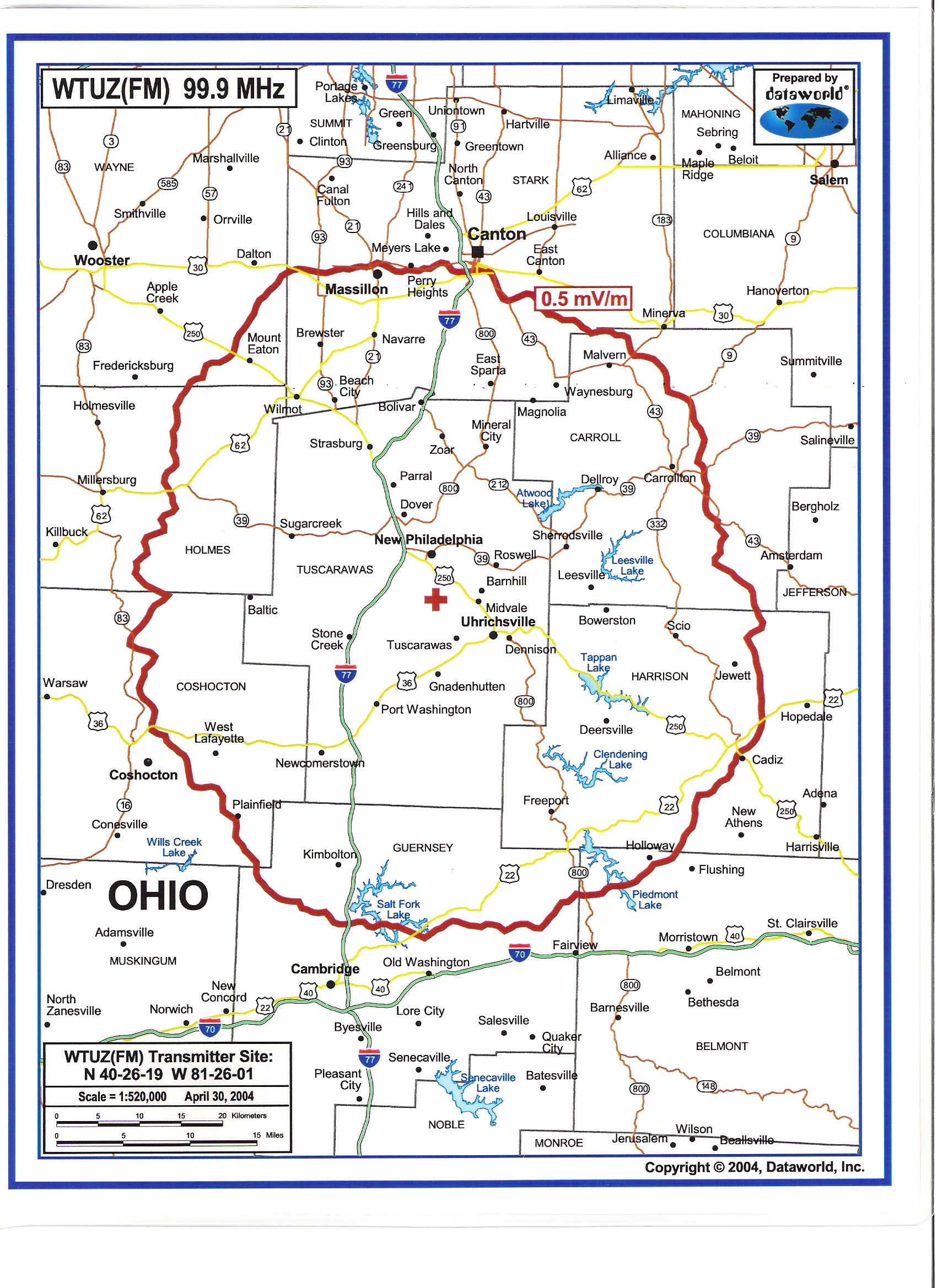
The red line indicates the "city grade" contour for WTUZ
