= WDLW =

Oldies radio station in Lorain, Ohio

- Lorain, Ohio; United States
- Broadcast area: Lorain County; Greater Cleveland (limited)
- Frequency: 1380 kHz
- Branding: Kool Kat WDLW

Programming
- Format: Classic rock
- Affiliations: Fox News Radio; ONN Radio

Ownership
- Owner: WDLW Radio, Inc.; (WDLW Radio, Inc.)
- Sister stations: WOBL

History
- First air date: December 4, 1969
- Former call signs: WLRO (1969–1984); WRKG (1984–1997); WELL (1997)

Technical information
- Licensing authority: FCC
- Facility ID: 70108
- Class: D
- Power: 500 watts (daytime); 57 watts (nighttime)
- Transmitter coordinates: 41°25′48.14″N 82°9′6.76″W
- Translator: 98.9 W255CW (Lorain)

Links
- Public license information: Public file; LMS
- Webcast: Listen live
- Website: wdlwradio.com

WDLW (1380 AM, "Kool Kat") is a commercial radio station licensed to Lorain, Ohio, United States, and features a classic rock format. Owned by WDLW Radio, Inc., the station serves Lorain County and western parts of Greater Cleveland, and is relayed over Lorain translator W255CW (98.9 FM). WDLW's studios are located in Oberlin, while the transmitters for both WDLW and W255CW reside in Sheffield Township. In addition to a standard analog transmission, WDLW is available online.

Signing on as WLRO in 1969 as the replacement to WWIZ, this station initially featured a full-service/middle of the road format oriented towards Lorain. A sale to real estate developer Jon Veard in 1984 saw the station become WRKG with an adult standards format, which changed again to a country gospel format in 1990 after another sale to Christian radio operators. Tropical music and other Spanish language programming, which had been featured in some capacity on 1380 AM throughout its history, became the station's primary format in 1998 as WDLW via a local marketing agreement with the Cleveland-based Latino Media Group. Sold to WOBL's owners Doug and Lorie Wilber in 2002, WDLW adopted an oldies format later in the year. Both stations have been owned by Gary and Renee Tollett from 2021 onward.

== History ==
=== WLRO (1969–1984) ===
Owned by Lorain Community Broadcasting Corporation, this station signed on as WLRO, fully replacing WWIZ after two and a half years of silence on 1380 AM. WWIZ's license renewal had been denied in 1964 because of an improper transfer of control for the station, ceasing operations on July 14, 1967. Lorain Community prevailed against two other applicants for a replacement license in a bidding process which began in 1966, one year before WWIZ signed off. WLRO was authorized to began operating on December 4, 1969, under a temporary permit, but due to several delays did not sign on until December 13. The official license for the station was not granted for over a year.

At launch, WLRO initially had a combined middle of the road and full-service format, with an emphasis on community news, and operated from 6 a.m. to sunset. The initial staff was composed of Bill King, Bob Ladd, Rodger Glover, sports anchor Jim Allen, news director Bill Wilkens, production director Jeff Baxter and music director Norm N. Nite. During this time, it was also an affiliate of the Mutual Broadcasting System and carried Mutual's coverage of Notre Dame football throughout the 1970s and 1980s. WLRO also carried Cleveland Indians daytime games in 1971 and 1972.

=== WRKG (1984–1997) ===
On July 7, 1984, WLRO was sold by Lorain Community Broadcasting to local real estate developer Jon Veard. Shortly thereafter, on July 13, the call sign was changed to WRKG and a pop standards format was installed. The WRKG calls stood for their new slogan, "Working for you is our business". The station's studios were moved to the Antlers Hotel in downtown Lorain, of which Veard also owned. The station still remained as a daytime station for many years, with overnight service (via just 57 watts) being added as of the fall of 1986.

Among the air talent that was on "Golden 13 Radio" at this time included Dick Conrad, John Antus, Donovan "D.K." Kent, Charles LuBear, Dave Rush, Lauren Wreath, John Ryan and sportscaster Jim Allen. Newscasts were handled by Craig Demyan, Joan Lowry, Mike Partin and Terry Burnabell. Ethnic programming on Sundays included the Ecos Latinos Hispanic music show hosted by Miguel Berlingeri, The Polka Express with Jimmy Bryda and The Friendly Promoter Club with Matty Bright.

On February 12, 1990, Jon Veard sold WRKG to Victory Radio, Inc. headed by Vernon Baldwin, who was also the owner of WZLE (104.9 FM). WRKG's format changed to country gospel during the day with personalities Terry Lee Goffee and Teri Drda, with Hispanic music played in the evening and overnight hours. WZLE was sold off in late 1998.

=== WDLW (1997–present) ===
By the spring of 1997, WRKG began simulcasting some programming from WELW in Willoughby, Ohio, during the daytime hours. Among WELW's fare carried by WRKG included audio from WOIO's morning, noon and 6 p.m. newscasts, and a daily polka show hosted by WELW co-owner Tony Petkovsek, a 36-year station veteran. Accordingly, the callsign was first changed to WELL on June 6, 1997, but was eventually switched again to WDLW that August 1. The nighttime hours remained devoted to Hispanic music, now amounting to over 80 hours a week.

During the Cleveland Indians' 1998 season, the team produced Spanish-language broadcasts for 12 games over a three-station network, with WDLW serving as the flagship. The commitment was extended through the 1998 playoffs. WDLW was converted into a 24-hour Spanish/tropical format in January 1999, dropping all WELW-originated programming and leasing operations over to the Latino Media Group. The airstaff was all-volunteer, midday host Luis "Loco Loco" Lugo worked at WDLW for eight months after the switch before quitting over lack of compensation; his replacement was nightclub DJ Benny Velez. WDLW also offered Spanish-language broadcasts of Cleveland Crunch indoor soccer.

On January 2, 2002, WDLW was sold a group consisting of Latino Media Group head Angel Ramos and WOBL owner Doug Wilber. Technical upgrades were made to the air signal, and WDLW's studios were moved from the Antlers Hotel to WOBL's studio/transmitter facility in Oberlin; by coincidence, the call sign became an initialism for Doug and his wife, Lorie Wilber. Citing a lack of advertising revenue outside of Lorain proper for the Hispanic format, WDLW switched formats to oldies on November 8, 2002, dubbed "Kool Kat Oldies 1380-AM." Wilber noted the station's multiple formats over the years shortly after the change, saying, "it's been a little bit of everything through the ages... it's been a station that has never had real stable programming. Hopefully, we have that now." Hispanic programming was retained on Sundays afternoons as part of a day-long ethnic block of programming hosted by local musician Jose "Pepe" Rivera, featuring music from both Puerto Rico and Mexico.

Both WDLW and WOBL were sold to Gary and Renee Tollett on March 1, 2021, for an undisclosed amount after Doug Wilber announced a pending retirement. Gary, who had been the station's existing general sales manager, pledged to keep the station owned by local interests and to keep their respective formats.

== Programming ==
WDLW is an affiliate of Fox News Radio and ONN Radio.

Local & national programming personalities include: "The Wakeup Call" w/ Mz. Nikki; "Midday Music Machine" w/ David Q; "The Afternoon Drive" w/ GT; "Hometown Voices Radio Show" w/ Russ Van Wormer; "Lorain County Scholastics Games"; "KoolKat Jukebook" w/ Brian Kelley; "The Magical Mystery Hour" w/ Matt Slys; "The Matt Show" w/ Matt; "Midday Madness" w/ DJ Jimbo; "The Funhouse Show" w/ Moe; "Saturday Night Special" w/ Russ, "The Vinyl Garage" w/ Dave Nelson; "American Warrior Radio" w/ Ben Buehler-Garcia; "Hispanic Radio Show"; "The Polka Express" w/ Tom Borowicz; "Floydian Slip" w/ Craig Bailey; "Yacht Rock Radio" w/ Adam Ritz; "Community Chatter"; "Conversations on Main Street"; "Jim Allen Sports Reports"; Various Daily Pod Casts; & Daily News Updates w/ Max the News Guy.

== FM translator ==
In late October 2015, WDLW acquired FM translator W293AZ in Elkhart, Indiana, for $20,000, a sale consummated in early January 2016. Paperwork was subsequently filed to relocate W293AZ to Lorain and serve as a rebroadcaster for WDLW.

Broadcast translator for WDLW
Call sign	Frequency	City of license	FID	ERP (W)	HAAT	Class	Transmitter coordinates	FCC info
W255CW	98.9 FM	Lorain, Ohio	148758	90	44.95 m (147 ft)	D	41°25′48.1″N 82°9′6.5″W	LMS

Signal contours for WDLW and associated translator.; Daytime groundwave 2 mV/m signal for WDLW; Grade A 60 dBu signal for W255CW
