= WOBL =

Radio station in Oberlin, Ohio

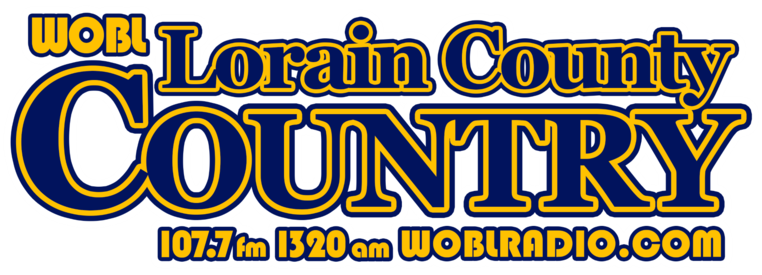
- Oberlin, Ohio; United States
- Broadcast area: Lorain County; Greater Cleveland (limited)
- Frequency: 1320 kHz
- Branding: Lorain County Country

Programming
- Format: Country
- Affiliations: Fox News Radio; ONN Radio

Ownership
- Owner: WOBL Radio, Inc.; (WOBL Radio, Inc.)
- Sister stations: WDLW

History
- First air date: December 24, 1971
- Former frequencies: 1570 kHz (1971–1976)
- Call sign meaning: "Oberlin"

Technical information
- Licensing authority: FCC
- Facility ID: 73364
- Class: B
- Power: 1,000 watts
- Transmitter coordinates: 41°16′5.00″N 82°12′40.00″W
- Translator: 107.7 W299CJ (Oberlin)

Links
- Public license information: Public file; LMS
- Webcast: Listen live
- Website: woblradio.com

WOBL (1320 AM) is a commercial radio station licensed to Oberlin, Ohio, serving Lorain County and western parts of Greater Cleveland featuring a country format known as "Lorain County Country" focused on 90's and today's country and sports. WOBL also simulcasts over low-power Oberlin translator W299CJ (107.7 FM). The WOBL studios are located in Oberlin, as are the transmitters for both WOBL and W299CJ. In addition to a standard analog transmission, WOBL is available online.

== History ==
WOBL began on December 24, 1971, at 1570 kHz as a daytime-only station with 250 watts of power. The station soon moved to a full-time signal at 1320 kHz by September 1976, where it has remained to this day. Its country music format has been the longest running such format of any station in the region, even with a segue into "classic country" in early 2003.

WOBL has been a family operation throughout its entire history, founded by Harry Wilber, and run by Doug and Lorie Wilber until March 2021.

WOBL Radio and its sister station is WDLW 1380 AM/98.9 FM in Lorain, which was acquired in late 2002 are now owned by Gary and Renee' Tollett for an undisclosed amount after Doug Wilber announced a pending retirement. Gary, who had been the station's existing general sales manager, pledged to keep the station owned by local interests and to keep their respective formats. The Tollett's purchased both stations as of October 1, 2021, to continue the family tradition of family owned radio stations. Both stations respective studios are at the WOBL transmitter site in Oberlin, Ohio.

== FM translator ==
Broadcast translator for WOBL
Call sign	Frequency	City of license	FID	ERP (W)	HAAT	Class	Transmitter coordinates	FCC info
W299CJ	107.7 FM	Oberlin, Ohio	144088	250	43.27 m (142 ft)	D	41°16′4.70″N 82°12′38.20″W	LMS

== Current programming ==
WOBL is a local affiliate for Fox News Radio, ONN Radio, Cleveland Crunch Soccer, Cleveland Guardians Radio Network and The Ohio State Sports Network.

Local personalities & national programming include "Back Stage Country" w/ Eliana Smith and a weekly special guest co-host; "Caffeine & Country" w/ Dave; "Afternoon Coffee Break" w/ Terry Lee; "Anthems & Outlaws" w/ Susie Smiley; "American Warrior Radio" w/ Ben Buehler-Garcia; "Bearded Browns" Podcast w/ Mike, Angel, Sam, & 'Dr. Chad'; "The Round Up" w/ Ben Parsons; "Community Chatter"; "Conversations on Main Street"; "Jim Allen Sports Reports"; Various Daily Pod Casts; & Daily News Updates w/ Max the News Guy.
