= WILE-FM =

- Byesville, Ohio; United States
- Broadcast area: Guernsey County, Ohio
- Frequency: 97.7 MHz

Programming
- Format: Soft Oldies - Adult Standards
- Affiliations: Fox News Radio; Westwood One's "America's Best Music"; Ohio State Sports Network

Ownership
- Owner: AVC Communications

History
- First air date: 1995
- Former call signs: WUFA (1992–1994, CP)

Technical information
- Licensing authority: FCC
- Facility ID: 13982
- Class: A
- ERP: 1,800 watts
- HAAT: 126 meters (413 ft)
- Transmitter coordinates: 40°2′24.00″N 81°38′50.00″W

Links
- Public license information: Public file; LMS
- Webcast: Listen Live
- Website: WILE-FM Online

WILE-FM (97.7 MHz) is a commercial radio station licensed to Byesville, Ohio, and serving Guernsey County, including the city of Cambridge. The station is owned by AVC Communications and broadcasts a Soft Oldies - Adult Standards radio format.

WILE-FM features programming from Westwood One's "America's Best Music" network. It also carries college football and basketball games from the Ohio State Sports Network.

== History ==
The station went on the air as WUFA on 30 July 1992. On 26 August 1994, it changed its call sign to the current WILE.
