= WXIZ =

- Waverly, Ohio; United States
- Frequency: 100.9 MHz
- Branding: 100.9 The Legend

Programming
- Format: Classic country
- Affiliations: ABC Radio; Jones Radio Network; Chillicothe Paints; Ohio State Sports Network

Ownership
- Owner: Total Media Group

Technical information
- Licensing authority: FCC
- Facility ID: 14651
- Class: A
- ERP: 4,200 watts
- HAAT: 132 meters (433 ft)
- Transmitter coordinates: 39°13′17.00″N 82°59′33.00″W

Links
- Public license information: Public file; LMS
- Webcast: Listen live
- Website: yourtotalmedia.com/wxiz-2/

WXIZ (100.9 FM) is a radio station broadcasting a classic country format. Licensed to Waverly, Ohio, United States, the station is currently owned by Total Media Group and features programming from ABC Radio and Jones Radio Network.

The studios for WXIZ are now located in Chillicothe, Ohio. The station's programming is centered around both the Ross and Pike County regions

The station was previously operated in different locations in Waverly throughout the years. Many local radio personalities had stints at WXIZ at different points in their careers.

On top of local DJs, the station also does remote broadcasts from various community events, including county fairs and festivals, as well as local high school sports, such as football and basketball.

In August 2025, WXIZ added an HD sub-channel on 103.7 FM. Branded as "Classic Hits" C103.7 WXIZ HD2, the station carries Chillicothe Cavaliers football games.

On November 2, 2026, WXIZ rebranded as "100.9 The Legend".
