= WQIO =

Radio station in Mount Vernon, Ohio

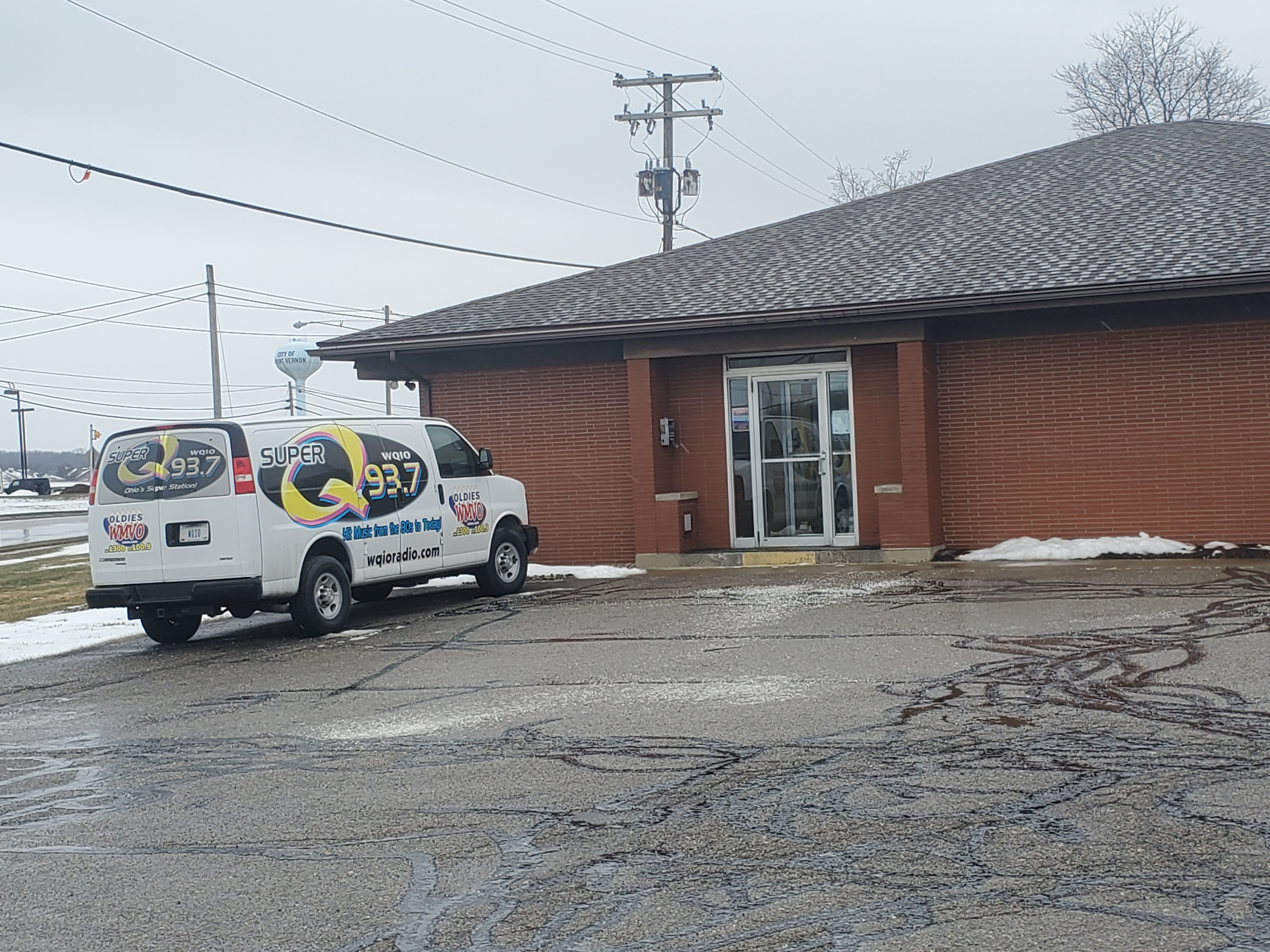
- WQIO's studios in Mount Vernon
- Mount Vernon, Ohio; United States
- Broadcast area: Mid-Ohio
- Frequency: 93.7 MHz (HD Radio)
- Branding: Super Q 93.7

Programming
- Language: English
- Format: Adult contemporary
- Subchannels: HD2: Oldies

Ownership
- Owner: BAS Broadcasting

History
- First air date: 1953
- Former call signs: WMVO-FM (1953–1986)
- Call sign meaning: Q/Ohio

Technical information
- Licensing authority: FCC
- Facility ID: 74475
- Class: B
- ERP: 37,000 watts
- HAAT: 172 meters (564 ft)
- Transmitter coordinates: 40.405°N 82.439°W
- Translator: HD2: 100.9 W265DJ (Mount Vernon)

Links
- Public license information: Public file; LMS
- Webcast: Listen live
- Website: www.wqioradio.com

WQIO (93.7 FM) is a radio station in Mount Vernon, Ohio. The station plays adult contemporary music as "The New Super Q 93.7". Currently. WQIO is currently owned by BAS Broadcasting of Fremont, Ohio.

== History ==
WQIO-FM and its former sister station WMVO were founded by Helen E. Zelkowitz in the 1950s and remained locally owned and operated under Mt. Vernon Broadcasting until its sale in 1994. During the 70s & early 80s, the station was known as The New O94, playing Adult Contemporary music with OM/Morning host Ron Staats.

In spring of 1986, along with its power increase from 20 to 50 kW, the station changed its call letters to WQIO with a live Adult-leaning CHR format. With Mike Greene as General Manager, the change was supported with new air talent and jingles, contests and promotions, and live remotes throughout the region. Some of the on air talent at the time included Jan Chamberlain, Bill Moore, Jon Zellner, Joel Riley, Tony Coles, with Mike Greene, Ric Knight and the Super Q Morning Crew: Dave Macy, Stacy McKay & Skip Bevington. These ventures, along with serious upgrades in branding and programming raised the station's appeal in the region, and even pulled in significant ratings from the Columbus Market—giving Columbus based WNCI a run for its money in areas that received WQIO's signal. It was during this time that branding such as "93.7 WQIO, Ohio's Super Station!" and "The Super Q" were implemented; these mottos have recently been resurrected by WQIO's present management. Known as "93.7 WQIO", WQIO was the region's most popular Top 40/CHR station, consistently rating first in Knox, Holmes, Ashland and Richland counties, and nearly beating WNCI multiple times in Licking and Delaware Counties.

In 1989, as a result of cost-cutting, majority of the staff left the station. The station continued its format until 1990, when it transformed into a simulcast of Transtar's Bright AC. In 1996 WQIO became one of its area's first Hot AC radio stations due to the competition of WYHT in Mansfield.

In 1994, Ashland Broadcasting purchased the stations to pair them with WNCO & WNCO-FM in nearby Ashland. The company's new name after the purchase from Zelkowitz was Knox Broadcasting, a division of Dean Stampfli's Ohio Radio Group. Ohio Radio Group eventually become a local radio powerhouse, owning 7 stations, including WFXN-FM (102.3, Galion, Ohio), WMAN-FM (98.3, Fredericktown, Ohio) and WXXF (107.7 Loudonville, Ohio). At that time, it was rebranded into "93Q", with a format closer to Hot AC programmed by Rod Staats aka Ric Knight from 1994 to 1997. Some of the air talent at that time, Trisha Moore, Joe Rinehart, Greg Burgess and Ric Knight. In 2000, Knox Broadcasting and the entire Ohio Radio Group was sold to Clear Channel Broadcasting for $32 Million.

WQIO and WMVO remained under Clear Channel ownership until October 1, 2005, when they were sold to the current owners, BAS Broadcasting. After that sale, WQIO adopted the name "The New Eagle 93.7", sharing the name with sister station "Eagle 99" WFRO-FM in Fremont. Upon the name change, the station initially carried the "Today's hits and Yesterday's favorites" satellite format from ABC Radio before taking Dial Global Local's "AC Pure" format.

On February 28, 2013, WQIO returned the "Super Q" branding, as well the iconic slogan "Ohio's Super Station!" albeit retaining its AC format.

On August 29, 2025, BAS sold WQIO and WMVO to Total Media Group. Total Media Group also has stations in Sandusky and Tiffin, Ohio.

WQIO was also the callsign used by 1060 AM in Canton, Ohio during its brief but successful run as a Top 40/CHR station in the late 1970s as "Q10". That station is now WILB, a Catholic broadcaster.
