= KXVV =

Radio station in Victorville, California

- Victorville, California; United States
- Broadcast area: Hesperia-Apple Valley, California
- Frequency: 103.1 MHz
- Branding: La X 103.1

Programming
- Language: Spanish
- Format: Regional Mexican

Ownership
- Owner: El Dorado Broadcasters LLC; (EDB VV License LLC)
- Sister stations: KATJ-FM; KIXA; KIXW; KZXY-FM

History
- First air date: August 18, 1980
- Former call signs: KVVQ (1980–1985); KVVQ-FM (1985–1997); KHDR-FM (1997–2000); KVFG (2000–2019)
- Call sign meaning: "La X Victor Valley"

Technical information
- Licensing authority: FCC
- Facility ID: 72717
- Class: A
- ERP: 250 watts
- HAAT: 475 meters (1,558 ft)
- Transmitter coordinates: 34°36′44″N 117°17′32.2″W

Links
- Public license information: Public file; LMS
- Website: lax1031.com

KXVV (103.1 FM, "La X 103.1") is a commercial radio station licensed to Victorville, California, United States, and serves the Victor Valley area. The station is owned by El Dorado Broadcasters and broadcasts a regional Mexican format. KXVV's studios and transmitter are located in Hesperia.

== History ==
The station signed on August 18, 1980, as KVVQ, a top 40 outlet owned by Kenneth B. Orchard. The call letters were changed to KVVQ-FM in 1985.

In November 1996, William Rice attempted to sell KVVQ-AM-FM to Power Surge Inc., headed by John Power, for $1 million. At the time, KVVQ-FM carried an oldies format. However, the deal fell through. The following February, Rice successfully sold the combo to Tele-Media Communications Corporation for $1.1 million. The new owner changed the call sign to KHDR-FM.

Logo for KVFG as ESPN Radio from 2010 to 2011.

In 2000, Infinity Broadcasting Corporation (predecessor to CBS Radio) acquired KHDR-FM from Tele-Media Broadcasting. Infinity changed the call letters to KVFG' and made the station a simulcast of KFRG, a country music station in San Bernardino, California. This lasted until February 16, 2010, when the station flipped to a sports format as an affiliate of ESPN Radio.

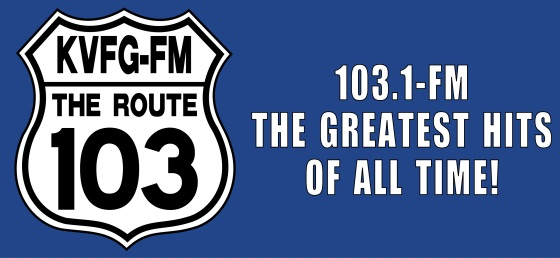
Logo for KVFG as 103 The Route from 2011 to 2019.

On November 15, 2011, KVFG began stunting with Christmas music; the sports format was moved to KRAK in Hesperia, California. On December 26 at 6 a.m., KVFG ended stunting and introduced a classic hits format branded as "103.1 The Route".

On February 2, 2017, CBS Radio announced it would merge with Entercom. The merger was approved on November 9, 2017, and was consummated on November 17.

On May 6, 2019, Entercom sold KVFG and KMPS to El Dorado Broadcasters for $1 million. The sale was completed on August 15, 2019, with the new owners simultaneously changing the station's call sign to KXVV. On August 26, 2019, at 6 p.m. the station flipped to a regional Mexican format, branded as "La X 103.1".
