= Cleveland Guardians Radio Network =

Regional play-by-play radio network

- Type: Radio network
- Country: United States
- Headquarters: Cleveland, Ohio
- Broadcast area: Ohio; New York (limited); Pennsylvania (limited)
- Owner: Cleveland Guardians
- Affiliation: MLB
- Affiliates: 26 (including 2 flagships)
- Official website: www.mlb.com/guardians/fans/radio-affiliates

The Cleveland Guardians Radio Network, branded for sponsorship purposes as the Cleveland Clinic Guardians Radio Network, is an American radio network composed of 29 radio stations for the Cleveland Guardians, a professional baseball team in Major League Baseball (MLB). Cleveland sister stations WTAM (1100 AM) and WMMS (100.7 FM) serve as the network's two flagships; WTAM also relays its signal over a low-power FM translator. The network also includes 24 affiliates in the U.S. states of Ohio, New York and Pennsylvania: fifteen AM stations, ten of which supplement their signals with low-power FM translators; seven full-power FM stations; and one HD Radio subchannel that supplement its signal with a low-power FM translator.

Tom Hamilton and Jim Rosenhaus currently serve as the network's play-by-play announcers. In addition to traditional over-the-air AM and FM broadcasts, network programming airs on SiriusXM satellite radio; and streams online via SiriusXM Internet Radio, TuneIn Premium, and MLB.com Gameday Audio.

== History ==
In May 15, 1948, the first broadcast took place at Cleveland Municipal Stadium where the then-Indians met the Chicago White Sox where broadcaster Van Patrick called the game where the Indians won 7-1.

== Programming ==
Play-by-play announcers Tom Hamilton and Jim Rosenhaus call games on-site. Rosenhaus hosts Guardians Warm-Up, the network pregame show; and Hamilton hosts Guardians Wrap-Up, the network postgame show; both shows typically run 30 minutes each.

Additional network programming includes the following:

- Guardians Update, a daily drive-time segment anchored by Rosenhaus
- Guardians Weekly, a weekly year-round show hosted by Rosenhaus; airs on Saturday mornings

Note that not all network affiliates carry the latter two programs; co-flagship WTAM carries all originated network programming.

== Announcers ==
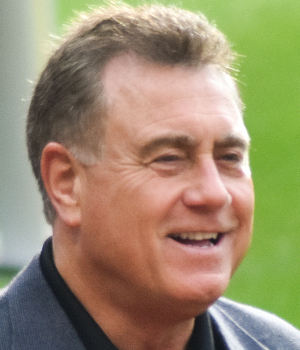
Tom Hamilton

Lead/Postgame	Secondary/Pregame
Tom Hamilton	Jim Rosenhaus

== Station list ==
Network stations as of the 2026 Cleveland Guardians season
Callsign	Frequency	Band	City	State	Network status
WTAM	1100	AM	Cleveland	Ohio	Flagship
WMMS	100.7	FM	Cleveland	Ohio	Flagship
W295DE	106.9	FM	Cleveland	Ohio	WTAM relay
WAKR	1590	AM	Akron	Ohio	Affiliate
W228EL	93.5	FM	Akron	Ohio	WAKR relay
WFUN	970	AM	Ashtabula	Ohio	Affiliate
WBNV	93.5	FM	Barnesville	Ohio	Affiliate
WBLL	1390	AM	Bellefontaine	Ohio	Affiliate
WBNO-FM	100.9	FM	Bryan	Ohio	Affiliate
WQEL	92.7	FM	Bucyrus	Ohio	Affiliate
WHBC	1480	AM	Canton	Ohio	Affiliate
WJER	1450	AM	Dover–New Phila.	Ohio	Affiliate
W265DL	100.9	FM	Dover–New Phila.	Ohio	WJER relay
WXKC	104.3	FM	Erie	Pennsylvania	Affiliate
WFIN	1330	AM	Findlay	Ohio	Affiliate
W238CX	95.5	FM	Findlay	Ohio	WFIN relay
WFOB	1430	AM	Fostoria	Ohio	Affiliate
W289CP	105.7	FM	Fostoria	Ohio	WFOB relay
WMAN-FM	98.3	FM	Fredericktown	Ohio	Affiliate
WKSN	1340	AM	Jamestown	New York	Affiliate
WWSR	93.1	FM	Lima	Ohio	Affiliate
WMAN	1400	AM	Mansfield	Ohio	Affiliate
WMRN	1490	AM	Marion	Ohio	Affiliate
WJAW-FM	100.9	FM	McConnelsville	Ohio	Affiliate
WQIO-HD2	93.7-2	FM	Mount Vernon	Ohio	Affiliate
W265DJ	100.9	FM	Mount Vernon	Ohio	WQIO-HD2 relay
WLKR-FM	95.3	FM	Norwalk	Ohio	Affiliate
WOBL	1320	AM	Oberlin	Ohio	Affiliate
W299CJ	107.7	FM	Oberlin	Ohio	WOBL relay
WLEC	1450	AM	Sandusky	Ohio	Affiliate
W228EN	93.5	FM	Sandusky	Ohio	WLEC relay
WSPD	1370	AM	Toledo	Ohio	Affiliate
W225AM	92.9	FM	Toledo	Ohio	WSPD relay
W295CI	106.9	FM	Urbana	Ohio	WBLL relay
WBTC	1540	AM	Uhrichsville	Ohio	Affiliate
W270CI	101.9	FM	Uhrichsville	Ohio	WBTC relay
WKBN	570	AM	Youngstown	Ohio	Affiliate

- Gray background indicates HD Radio broadcast.
- Blue background indicates low-power FM translator.

=== Network map ===
'"`UNIQ--templatestyles-00000030-QINU`"'
- Cleveland Guardians Radio Network stations. Click on each marker to reveal details.
- '"`UNIQ--templatestyles-0000002C-QINU`"''"`UNIQ--templatestyles-0000002F-QINU`"'
  - '"`UNIQ--templatestyles-0000002D-QINU`"'
    Flagship stations
  - '"`UNIQ--templatestyles-0000002E-QINU`"'
    Affiliates (including translators)
