= WBNV =

Radio station in Barnesville, Ohio

- Barnesville, Ohio; United States
- Broadcast area: Wheeling, West Virginia
- Frequency: 93.5 MHz
- Branding: 93BNV

Programming
- Format: Classic hits
- Affiliations: Cleveland Guardians Radio Network; Jones Radio Network

Ownership
- Owner: Joel Losego; (AVC Communications, Inc.)

History
- First air date: July 1, 1991
- Call sign meaning: BarNesVille

Technical information
- Licensing authority: FCC
- Facility ID: 70553
- Class: A
- ERP: 2,500 watts
- HAAT: 149 meters

Links
- Public license information: Public file; LMS
- Webcast: Listen Live
- Website: WBNV Online

WBNV (93.5 FM) is a radio station broadcasting a classic hits format. Licensed to Barnesville, Ohio, United States, the station serves the Wheeling area. The station is currently owned by Joel Losego, through licensee AVC Communications, Inc.
