= WDJO =

Radio station in Cincinnati, Ohio

- Cincinnati, Ohio; United States
- Broadcast area: Greater Cincinnati
- Frequency: 1480 kHz
- Branding: WDJO 99.5, 107.9 FM & 1480 AM

Programming
- Format: Oldies
- Affiliations: ABC News Radio; Ohio State Sports Network

Ownership
- Owner: Robert T. Nolan; (Mustang Media, Inc.)

History
- First air date: 1953
- Former call signs: WCIN (1953–2010)

Technical information
- Licensing authority: FCC
- Facility ID: 32953
- Class: B
- Power: 4,500 watts (day); 300 watts (night)
- Transmitter coordinates: 39°12′43″N 84°29′20″W
- Translators: 95.3 W237FL (Milford); 99.5 W258CI (Cincinnati); 107.9 W300CI (Cincinnati)

Links
- Public license information: Public file; LMS
- Webcast: Listen live
- Website: oldies1480.net

WDJO (1480 AM) is a commercial radio station licensed to Cincinnati, Ohio, United States, that airs an oldies format. The station is the Cincinnati affiliate for the Ohio State Sports Network. WDJO is owned by Robert T. Nolan, through licensee Mustang Media, Inc. The station operates at 4,500 watts during the day and 300 watts at night.

The station was long known as WCIN, called "The Pulse of the City", and provided programming for the African-American community of the tri-state area until May 17, 2007, except for a brief time in the 1990s, when it broadcast classical music. In 2019 the station became the main radio broadcaster of FC Cincinnati matches.

== History ==
The station was established in 1953 as WCIN. During the 1960s, WCIN became a highly regarded soul music station featuring a variety of African-American personalities.

In 1995, then-owner J4 Broadcasting Network bought radio stations in Norfolk, Virginia; New Bern, North Carolina; and Myrtle Beach, South Carolina; and began distributing its "Classic Oldies" format of 50s-70s R&B, jazz and blues to those stations. J4 owner and president John C. Thomas hoped to expand to more stations. Allen Guess served as morning host, Marsha Robinson did afternoons, and Jim Morris handled evenings.

In January 2006, the station was placed up for auction to settle a $954,679 judgment against J4 Broadcasting and owner John Thomas. On May 15, Bob Cox of St. Louis, Missouri was appointed successor receiver by the federal district court. Two days later, after a stunt in which the station broadcast nothing but a simulated heartbeat and on the hourly station ID, listeners would hear: "You asked for it, and prayed for it... Coming soon", the station switched to a smooth jazz format.

WCIN's programming was delivered via satellite from Jones Radio Networks until September 30, 2008, when it switched over to Broadcast Architecture's newer Smooth Jazz Network. It was one of the few AM stations in the United States featuring smooth jazz, and is the first station with the format in Cincinnati since WVAE 94.9 FM dropped it in 1999 to become WMOJ.

Former logo

In May 2009, the station dropped smooth jazz and switched to a simulcast of then-sister station WDJO's oldies format, in preparation of picking up that station's format and call letters. The new WDJO was soon purchased by Alchemy Broadcasting. The company retained the smooth jazz programming as an online streaming station .

In 2011, WDJO became the Cincinnati affiliate the Ohio State Buckeyes Radio Network, airing OSU football and men's basketball games and coaches' shows.

Alchemy Broadcasting sold WDJO to Robert T. Nolan's Mustang Media, Inc. in a transaction that closed on April 6, 2015.
