= WQEL =

Radio station in Bucyrus, Ohio

- Bucyrus, Ohio; United States
- Broadcast area: Mid-Ohio region
- Frequency: 92.7 MHz
- Branding: Q92.7

Programming
- Format: Classic rock
- Affiliations: United Stations Radio Network; Westwood One; Cleveland Guardians Radio Network; Ohio State Sports Network

Ownership
- Owner: Saga Communications; (Franklin Communications, Inc.)
- Sister stations: WBCO

History
- First air date: 1964 (as WBCO-FM)
- Former call signs: WBCO-FM (1964–1978); WBCQ (1978–1987)

Technical information
- Licensing authority: FCC
- Facility ID: 7112
- Class: A
- ERP: 3,000 watts
- HAAT: 93 meters (305 ft)
- Transmitter coordinates: 40°45′49.00″N 82°56′0.00″W

Links
- Public license information: Public file; LMS
- Webcast: Listen Live
- Website: wqel.com

WQEL (92.7 FM) is a radio station broadcasting a classic rock format. Licensed to Bucyrus, Ohio, United States, the station serves the Mid-Ohio region. The station is owned by Saga Communications under licensee Franklin Communications, and operates as part of its North central Ohio Media Group. It features programming from United Stations Radio Networks and Westwood One.

== History ==
92.7 FM went on the air in 1964 as WBCO-FM, the sister station to WBCO. WBCO was founded in 1962 by Thomas P. & J. LaVonne Moore and Orville J. Sather as Brokensword Broadcasting Co. When the Moores and Sathers bought out the investors, it became Sa-Mor Stations. Full ownership was assumed by Tom and LaVonne following Orville's death. The stations were sold to Mike and Donna Laipply in 2001. the station was purchased by Scantland Broadcasting, then purchased by current Saga Communications.

The station was assigned call sign WBCQ on October 26, 1978. On August 16, 1987, the station changed its call sign to the current WQEL.

== Previous logo ==
(WQEL's logo under previous classic hits format)
