= WMOV (AM) =

- Ravenswood, West Virginia; United States
- Broadcast area: Ravenswood; Ripley; Jackson County
- Frequency: 1360 kHz
- Branding: AM1360, FM106-9, and 93-5 WMOV

Programming
- Format: Talk and sports
- Affiliations: West Virginia MetroNews

Ownership
- Owner: Vandalia Media Partners, LLC
- Sister stations: WJEH-FM

History
- First air date: 1958
- Call sign meaning: Mid Ohio Valley

Technical information
- Licensing authority: FCC
- Facility ID: 24585
- Class: D
- Power: 5,000 watts (days only)
- Transmitter coordinates: 38°57′56.0″N 81°45′59.0″W
- Translators: 93.5 W228DJ (Ravenswood); 106.9 W295DM (Point Pleasant)

Links
- Public license information: Public file; LMS
- Website: wmovradio.com

WMOV (1360 AM) is a talk and sports formatted radio station licensed to Ravenswood, West Virginia, serving Ravenswood and Ripley in Jackson County, West Virginia. WMOV is owned and operated by Vandalia Media Partners, LLC.
