= WRCL =

- Frankenmuth, Michigan; United States
- Broadcast area: Flint, Michigan
- Frequency: 93.7 MHz
- Branding: Club 93-7

Programming
- Format: Rhythmic CHR
- Affiliations: Compass Media Networks

Ownership
- Owner: Townsquare Media; (Townsquare Media of Flint, Inc.)
- Sister stations: WCRZ, WQUS, WWBN

History
- First air date: May 2001
- Former call signs: WZRZ (3/19/01-2/22/02)
- Call sign meaning: Regent (former owners) Club 93-7

Technical information
- Licensing authority: FCC
- Facility ID: 78673
- Class: A
- Power: 3,500 watts
- HAAT: 133 meters
- Transmitter coordinates: 43°18′16″N 83°33′7″W

Links
- Public license information: Public file; LMS
- Webcast: Listen Live
- Website: club937.com

WRCL (93.7 FM) is a commercial broadcast radio station serving the mid Michigan area (Flint, Saginaw and Bay City). It plays rhythmic contemporary hits, naming itself Club 93-7. The transmitter is in Tuscola County, but the studios are in Burton, east of Flint. It station is owned by Townsquare Media.

WRCL offers a musical playlist consisting of a recent mix of hip hop and R&B except for contemporary gospel on Sunday mornings. WRCL's core audience includes teens, adults 18-34 (primarily women) and African Americans. The station's ethnic composition is around 50% African-American and 50% White/other (according to Nielsen Audio).

== History ==
WRCL signed on with a heavily gold-based adult contemporary format broadcasting as WZRZ-FM, airing an automated, commercial-free mix of music from the 1970s and 1980s. After purchasing the station, Regent Communications (now Townsquare Media) flipped the station on Tuesday, January 8, 2002 to its current rhythmic top 40 format focusing on the Flint market. Regent Communications was known for its successful country music and adult contemporary formats. WRCL was its first rhythmic top 40. The station was intended to be a niche format to eat away at the listenership of Cumulus's WWCK-FM and WDZZ and protect the ratings of its adult contemporary sister-station WCRZ. In its first year, the new Club 93-7 playlist was heavy on Top 40 hits, especially upbeat party-type songs not limited to dance music, house, urban, other crossover titles and artists. The debut was better than Regent expected, so the station began to broaden its audience by playing less dance- and house-influenced music and more urban pop titles such as Destiny's Child, Usher Raymond and Eminem.

The success of WRCL also served as the blueprint for future Regent rhythmic top 40 formats. The company has six other rhythmic top 40 and mainstream top 40 stations. Based on the WRCL model are WZPW in Peoria, Illinois, and KHXT in Lafayette, Louisiana (WZPW was later traded to Cumulus Media in 2012 as part of 65-station swap Townsquare made with Cumulus). The other four mainstream top 40 stations from Regent/Townsquare are KKSR in St. Cloud, Minnesota; KNNN in Redding, California; WBNQ in Bloomington, Illinois; and WDKS in Evansville, Indiana (the latter having flirted with rhythmic from August 2007 to March 2008). A seventh one, rhythmic top 40 KZAP in Chico, California, was sold in 2007 and flipped formats after the sale was completed.

By 2003, WCRZ remained the top ranked and revenue grossing station in the Flint market. Stiff competition from WDZZ and WWCK both adding more "adult" music in an attempt to capture some of WCRZ's audience share. In response, Regent invested additional resources into WRCL to make a more concerted effort in capturing market share from Cumulus. Ironically, Regent's gain came at the expense of Cumulus. In February 2003, nighttime personality "Clay" from WWCK left the station and joined WRCL in the same capacity.

In March 2003, Cumulus-Myrtle Beach personality "Ced Lover" joined WRCL as the afternoon personality. With a leaner WRCL playlist of more urban contemporary and Top 40 songs to go after the younger WDZZ and WWCK audiences, both "Clay" and "Ced Lover" beat WDZZ and WWCK in their first overall ratings periods. That year WDZZ dropped all hip-hop and current music from its playlist and shifted to gold-based urban adult contemporary, which had less competition from WOWE. WDZZ remained ranked #2 in the Flint market while WRCL had surpassed WWCK in the overall ratings. In 2004, WWCK shifted from an adult top 40 back to a mainstream Top 40, but WRCL continued to win in the overall ratings. Head-to-head, WWCK would lose to WRCL the remainder of that year, but beat them in one period of 2005. WRCL again topped WWCK in late 2005. Also in 2005, nighttime personality "Clay" was promoted to morning personality as WRCL debuted "The Morning Roll-Out with Clay"> This was the first live morning show for the radio station. The WRCL morning show was previously all-music with only weather and traffic updates.

== Sources ==
- Michiguide.com - WRCL History
