= KYYT =

- Goldendale, Washington; United States
- Broadcast area: The Dalles, Oregon
- Frequency: 102.3 MHz (HD Radio)
- Branding: Gorge Country Y102

Programming
- Format: Country; HD2: Classic hits ("103.1 The Rock")
- Affiliations: Citadel Media, Dial Global

Ownership
- Owner: Shannon Milburn and Colette Carpenter; (Gorge Country Media, Inc.)
- Sister stations: KLCK, KRSX

History
- First air date: 1992
- Former call signs: KZPC (1990–1991, CP)

Technical information
- Licensing authority: FCC
- Facility ID: 12242
- Class: C2
- ERP: 2,100 watts
- HAAT: 571 meters (1,873 ft)
- Transmitter coordinates: 45°40′53.00″N 120°54′30.00″W
- Translators: K276EE (103.1 MHz, The Dalles, rebroadcasts HD2)

Links
- Public license information: Public file; LMS
- Website: gorgecountry.com

KYYT (102.3 FM, "Gorge Country Y102") is a radio station broadcasting a country music format. Licensed to Goldendale, Washington, United States, the station is currently owned by Shannon Milburn and Colette Carpenter, through licensee Gorge Country Media, Inc., and features programming from Citadel Media and Dial Global.
