= WJEH-FM =

- Racine, Ohio; United States
- Frequency: 93.1 kHz
- Branding: 93.1 The Wolf

Programming
- Format: Country

Ownership
- Owner: Thomas L. Susman; (Vandalia Media Partners 2, LLC)
- Sister stations: WMOV

History
- First air date: 1996 (as WFYZ)
- Former call signs: WFYZ (1993–1998); WMOV-FM (1998–2001); WLWF (2001–2006); WNTO (2006–2020)

Technical information
- Licensing authority: FCC
- Facility ID: 50736
- Class: A
- ERP: 4,100 watts
- HAAT: 121.1 meters (397 ft)
- Transmitter coordinates: 38°53′35″N 81°46′51″W

Links
- Public license information: Public file; LMS
- Webcast: Listen Live
- Website: Official Website

WJEH-FM (93.1 FM, "93.1 The Wolf") is an American radio station licensed to serve the community of Racine, Ohio. The station is owned by Thomas Susman, through licensee Vandalia Media Partners 2, LLC. It airs a new country music format.

== History ==
The station was assigned the call letters WJEH-FM on January 27, 2020, having previously held the WNTO call letters, assigned by the Federal Communications Commission on July 5, 2006. It was formerly licensed to Ravenswood, West Virginia, before being granted a construction permit in 2005 to change its city of license to Racine.

== Programming ==
WJEH-FM is locally owned and covers Gallipolis, Pomeroy, Point Pleasant, Ravenswood, and Ripley. The station plays Superstar Country. The station's morning show, The Morning Howl, provides great music and news and information to start the day. WJEH also carries The Ohio State Football and Basketball.
