= WWBN =

Radio station in Tuscola–Flint, Michigan

- Tuscola, Michigan; United States
- Broadcast area: Flint, MI/The Thumb, MI
- Frequency: 101.5 MHz
- Branding: Banana 101.5

Programming
- Format: Mainstream rock
- Affiliations: Compass Media Networks

Ownership
- Owner: Townsquare Media; (Townsquare Media of Flint, Inc.)
- Sister stations: WCRZ, WQUS, WRCL

History
- First air date: September 16, 1994 (at 101.5)
- Former call signs: WKMF-FM (12/91-9/94); WGMZ-FM (7/87-12/91)
- Call sign meaning: BaNana

Technical information
- Licensing authority: FCC
- Facility ID: 20448
- Class: A
- ERP: 1,800 watts
- HAAT: 149 meters
- Transmitter coordinates: 43°12′0″N 83°33′30″W

Links
- Public license information: Public file; LMS
- Webcast: Listen Live
- Website: banana1015.com

WWBN (101.5 FM, "Banana 101.5") is a radio station broadcasting mainstream rock to Flint and The Thumb areas of Michigan. Syndicated shows on Banana include the morning comedy program The Free Beer and Hot Wings Show and the nightly music program Loudwire. It is owned by Townsquare Media and is a member of the Michigan Association of Broadcasters

== History ==
The station began operations in 1987 as WGMZ-FM with an Easy Listening music format, reviving the call sign and format formerly used on 107.9 FM (now WCRZ) from 1961 to 1984 and also in the 1980s on 1570 AM (now WWCK). In 1991, WGMZ-FM became country WKMF-FM, simulcasting AM 1470 (now WFNT). The "Banana" name, album-oriented rock format and the WWBN calls debuted in 1994. Subsequently, WWBN moved from 101.7 to 101.5 in a frequency swap with WPRJ, a contemporary Christian music station in Coleman, Michigan, and both stations were also able to increase their power.

WWBN's owner, Regent Broadcasting (now Townsquare Media), took control of active rock station WRXF 103.1 FM "Radio X" in Lapeer, Michigan in December 2001. After a short three-month period of simulcasting the Banana on 103.1, WRXF debuted a new classic hits format as "U.S. 103.1" WQUS in February 2002, and the Banana evolved from mainstream AOR into its current active rock sound. Current program director and air personality Tony LaBrie is a veteran of WRXF's "Radio X" days and is the recipient of the RadioContraband Rock Radio Award for Small Market Radio Program Director of the Year in both 2011 and 2012. The Banana was voted "Small Market Radio Station of the Year" for the RadioContraband Rock Radio Award in 2011.

== Sources ==
- Michiguide.com - WWBN History
