= KLCK (AM) =

- Goldendale, Washington; United States
- Broadcast area: The Dalles, Oregon
- Frequency: 1400 kHz
- Branding: 1400 Talk

Programming
- Format: Talk
- Affiliations: CBS News Radio; Compass Media Networks; Genesis Communications Network; Premiere Networks; USA Radio Network; Westwood One

Ownership
- Owner: Shannon Milburn and Colette Carpenter; (Gorge Country Media, Inc.)
- Sister stations: KRSX, KYYT

History
- First air date: 1984
- Call sign meaning: KLiCKitat County

Technical information
- Licensing authority: FCC
- Facility ID: 35060
- Class: C
- Power: 1,000 watts unlimited
- Transmitter coordinates: 45°49′25″N 120°50′16″W
- Translator: 98.1 K251CR (Goldendale)

Links
- Public license information: Public file; LMS
- Webcast: Listen Live
- Website: klck1400.com

KLCK (1400 kHz) is an AM radio station broadcasting a talk radio format. Licensed to Goldendale, Washington, United States, the station is currently owned by Shannon Milburn and Colette Carpenter, through licensee Gorge Country Media, Inc.
