= WQUS =

Radio station in Lapeer, Michigan

- Lapeer, Michigan; United States
- Broadcast area: Lapeer County, Michigan
- Frequency: 103.1 MHz
- Branding: 103.1 The Ticket

Programming
- Format: Sports
- Affiliations: Compass Media Networks; Flint Firebirds; Lapeer Lightning football

Ownership
- Owner: Townsquare Media; (Townsquare Media of Flint, Inc.)
- Sister stations: WCRZ, WRCL, WWBN

History
- First air date: February 6, 1968
- Former call signs: WTHM-FM (1968–1980); WDEY-FM (1980–1990); WWGZ (1990); WWGZ-FM (1990–1998); WRXF (1998–2003)

Technical information
- Licensing authority: FCC
- Facility ID: 14224
- Class: A
- ERP: 2,600 watts
- HAAT: 104 meters (341 ft)
- Transmitter coordinates: 43°04′43″N 83°11′24″W

Links
- Public license information: Public file; LMS
- Webcast: Listen live
- Website: 1031theticket.com

WQUS (103.1 FM, "103.1 The Ticket") is a commercial radio station licensed to Lapeer, Michigan, United States, and broadcasting a sports radio format. It is owned by Townsquare Media and also airs live game broadcasts of two local sports teams: the Ontario Hockey League's Flint Firebirds and Lapeer Lightning high school football.

The transmitter is on Haines Road in Lum, Michigan, while the studios are in Burton, east of Flint.

== History ==
The station signed on the air on February 6, 1968, as WTHM-FM. For many years it simulcast its AM sister station WTHM (now as WLCO). The call letters stood for "The Thumb" area of east central Michigan. WTHM-AM-FM was a full-service station featuring middle of the road (MOR) and adult contemporary music, along with local news and sports. WTHM-FM allowed Lapeer residents to have local radio service after its daytime-only AM station was mandated to sign off at sunset. Later on, the call letters were switched to WDEY-AM-FM. The format remained full service AC.

WDEY-AM-FM were owned for many years by James Sommerville, who sold both to Covenant Communications in 1991. Five years following the acquisition by Covenant, the FM station, by this time known as WWGZ-FM (Wings 103), had switched to an album rock format and became more of a regional station, serving listeners in Flint. The AM station adopted a sports radio format and the new call letters WLSP. It later flipped to a talk radio format and then adult standards prior to becoming an affiliate of the "Real Country" network as WLCO.

In 1998 WWGZ-FM changed its call sign to WRXF (Radio X) and took on a more Active Rock/Heavy metal sound. One Radio X veteran, Tony LaBrie, later became the music director and DJ at 103.1 FM's sister station WWBN.

Both WLSP-AM and WRXF-FM were sold in December 2001 to Regent Communications (now Townsquare Media) for $1.3 million. Shortly after the transaction was announced, WRXF ended its independent programming and became a simulcast of its new FM sister station, WWBN "Banana 101.5". The simulcast ended almost three months later, when 103.1 once again became independently programmed, rebranding as classic rock "US 103.1".

Both stations then moved from their longtime location at 286 West Nepessing Street in Lapeer to join their co-owned Regent sister stations at G-3338 East Bristol Road in the Flint suburb of Burton.

By 2025, the station's ratings had been minuscule in comparison to its main competitor WRSR, only reaching a 0.3 share in Nielsen Audio's Spring 2025 books, and not registering at all on its Fall 2025 books (in comparison to WRSR, which had a 6.5 share and was second place in the Flint market overall). On June 1, 2026, WQUS flipped to sports radio as "103.1 The Ticket"; the rebranded station is affiliated with WXYT-FM's statewide network. The flip gives WXYT's network coverage in all five of Townsquare Media's markets in Michigan. Prior to the sports flip, WQUS was simulcast on sister station WCRZ's second digital subchannel, this ended after the format flip.
