= Helen Zelkowitz =

American broadcaster

- Born: Helen E. Weiner; November 7, 1911; Columbus, Ohio, U.S.
- Died: December 16, 2006 (aged 95); Columbus, Ohio, U.S.
- Occupation: News presenter
- Spouse: Charles Zelkowitz (m. 1933)

Helen E. Weiner Zelkowitz (November 7, 1911 – December 16, 2006) was an American broadcaster, the co-founder of two radio stations, and a member of the Ohio Women's Hall of Fame.

== Early years ==
Zelkowitz was born and raised in Columbus, Ohio.

== Broadcasting ==
On May 26, 1951, Zelkowitz and her husband, Charles, began WMVO-FM, a radio station in Mount Vernon, Ohio. They complemented that station with the launching of WMVO (AM) in Mount Vernon two years later. In 1972, they expanded their media holdings with the creation of Mount Vernon Cablevision.

Zelkowitz was involved with the two stations in a variety of ways, from being president of the business to being sales manager, general manager, and community director. After the creation of Mount Vernon Cablevision, she served as chairperson of the board of the three operations' umbrella organization, Mount Vernon Broadcasting Company. On the air, she was host of the Coffee Cup program, described as "an intimate daily portrait of Knox County life", for 44 years. She was estimated to have broadcast 11,440 episodes of that program.

== Civic activities ==
In 1977, Zelkowitz was appointed to a three-year term as a member of the Ohio State Newark Campus Citizens Advisory Council.

Zelkowitz and her family played a key role in creating the Food for the Hungry Drive in 1981. She also was charter president of the Mount Vernon chapter of Soroptimist International.

In 2001, Zelkowitz donated $50,000 to Kenyon College to establish the Zelkowitz Family Kenyon Hillel Endowment Fund to support Jewish studies and Jewish education at the college.

== Personal life ==
She married Charles Zelkowitz on February 13, 1933.

== Death ==
On December 16, 2006, Zelkowitz died at Grant Hospital in Columbus, Ohio, after being injured as a passenger in a single-car accident. She was 95 years old.

== Recognition ==
In 1971, Zelkowitz was recognized by the Hi-O chapter of the American Women in Radio and Television for her contributions to the broadcasting industry. She was also the first recipient of the Woman Broadcaster of the Year from the Ohio Assistant of Broadcasters.

In 1997, Zelkowitz became a member of the Ohio Women's Hall of Fame.
