= KRSX (FM) =

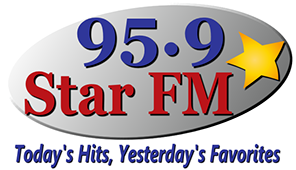
- Goldendale, Washington; United States
- Broadcast area: The Dalles, Oregon
- Frequency: 95.9 MHz
- Branding: 95.9 Star FM

Programming
- Language: English
- Format: Adult contemporary

Ownership
- Owner: Shannon Milburn and Colette Carpenter; (Gorge Country Media)
- Sister stations: KYYT, KLCK

History
- First air date: July 3, 2015

Technical information
- Licensing authority: FCC
- Facility ID: 190372
- Class: C2
- ERP: 2,200 watts
- HAAT: 601 meters (1,972 ft)
- Transmitter coordinates: 45°42′42″N 121°07′03″W

Links
- Public license information: (FM) Public file; LMS
- Website: 959starfm.com

KRSX (95.9 FM) is a radio station licensed to serve Goldendale, Washington, USA and The Dalles, Oregon radio market. The station is owned by Gorge Country Media.

== History ==
The adult contemporary format now on 95.9 was originally heard on 103.1 K276EE and KYYT-HD2. The sign-on date of the format on this translator is unknown. On July 3, 2015 KRSX signed on as a new signal, owned by Sunnylands Broadcasting, but operated by Haystack Broadcasting under a local marketing agreement. In January 2016, Haystack Broadcasting sold its stations to Gorge Country Media.
