= KATJ-FM =

- George, California; United States
- Broadcast area: Victorville—Apple Valley, California
- Frequency: 100.7 MHz (HD Radio)
- Branding: Kat Country 100.7

Programming
- Format: Country
- Subchannels: HD2: Rhythmic contemporary "HD 96.3"
- Affiliations: Premiere Networks

Ownership
- Owner: El Dorado Broadcasters; (EDB VV License LLC)
- Sister stations: KIXA; KIXW; KXVV; KZXY-FM

History
- First air date: June 29, 1989
- Call sign meaning: "Kat"

Technical information
- Licensing authority: FCC
- Facility ID: 29224
- Class: A
- ERP: 260 watts
- HAAT: 472 meters (1,549 ft)
- Transmitter coordinates: 34.611°N 117.289°W
- Translator: HD2: 96.3 K242CS (Victorville)

Links
- Public license information: Public file; LMS
- Website: www.katcountry1007.com; www.hdhiphop963.com (HD2)

KATJ-FM (100.7 MHz) is a commercial radio station located in Victorville, California, that serves the Victor Valley area. The station is owned by El Dorado Broadcasters and broadcasts a country music format. The official city of license is George, referring to George Air Force Base, which at the station's 1989 sign-on was an active military base and census-designated place. The base was decommissioned in 1992 and later annexed by the city of Victorville.

KATJ-FM broadcasts in HD Radio.

== History ==
KATJ-FM first signed on June 29, 1989, with a country music format. It was licensed to the community of George, California; this referred to George Air Force Base, an active military base and census-designated place near Victorville. The base was decommissioned in 1992 and it became the civilian Southern California Logistics Airport, an area later annexed by the city of Victorville. Original owner Crown Broadcasting, headed by Sid King, attempted to sell KATJ-FM and sister station KCIN (1590 AM) to Victor Valley Broadcasting for $1.36 million in August 1989. The potential buyer was a company led by Kenneth Devine, Peter Trosclair, and John Binsfield, all partners in a New Orleans–based engineering company. However, that transaction was unsuccessful. Crown then struck a deal with Island Broadcasting Corporation, headed by Scott Brady and Richard Sadowsky, in October 1990 to purchase the combo for $1.575 million. The Federal Communications Commission (FCC) approved the transfer of both stations' licenses to the new owner December 21.

In January 1995, Island Broadcasting sold KATJ-FM and KCIN to Park Lane Group for $1.8 million. In June 1996, the station hired Harry Hall, former afternoon drive show producer at Los Angeles country station KZLA, as a part-time on-air personality. In June 1997, Regent Communications purchased Park Lane Group's 16 stations in California and Arizona, including KATJ-FM, for a total of $23.5 million.

In April 2000, Clear Channel Communications proposed a complex station swap with Regent Communications which would have involved 20 stations nationwide, including KATJ-FM, and a payment of over $67 million by Regent to Clear Channel. This deal was one of many divestitures required of Clear Channel and AMFM, Inc. by the FCC as a condition of their merger, in order to satisfy ownership caps in each affected media market. While this exchange was not implemented fully, Clear Channel did acquire KATJ-FM and its AM sister station, now called KROY.

In June 2007, Clear Channel sold 16 stations in California and Arizona, including KATJ-FM, to El Dorado Broadcasters for $40 million.

== HD Radio ==
KATJ-FM broadcasts in HD Radio and offers two digital subchannels:

- KATJ-HD1 is a digital simulcast of the analog signal.
- KATJ-HD2 airs a rhythmic contemporary format branded as "HD 96.3". KATJ-HD2 is simulcast on translator station K242CS in Victorville at 96.3 FM. The format was launched on March 15, 2016.
