= WTNS (AM) =

Radio station in Coshocton, Ohio

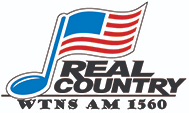
- Coshocton, Ohio; United States
- Broadcast area: Newcomerstown, Ohio; New Philadelphia, Ohio
- Frequency: 1560 kHz
- Branding: Real Country AM 1560

Programming
- Format: Country music

Ownership
- Owner: Coshocton Broadcasting Co.
- Sister stations: WTNS-FM

Technical information
- Licensing authority: FCC
- Facility ID: 13981
- Class: D
- Power: 1,000 watts day
- Transmitter coordinates: 40°16′30.00″N 81°49′37.00″W
- Translators: W274CG (102.7 MHz, Coshocton)

Links
- Public license information: Public file; LMS
- Website: mywtnsradio.com

WTNS (1560 AM) is a radio station broadcasting a country music format. Licensed to Coshocton, Ohio, United States, the station is owned by Coshocton Broadcasting Co.

== History ==
WTNS received its operating license December 30, 1947.
