= WMAN-FM =

Radio station in Fredericktown, Ohio

Simulcast of WMAN, Mansfield
- Fredericktown, Ohio; United States
- Broadcast area: Richland County; Ashland County; Knox County
- Frequency: 98.3 MHz (HD Radio)
- Branding: FM News Radio 98.3 WMAN

Programming
- Language: English
- Format: News/talk
- Affiliations: Fox News Radio; Agri Broadcast Network; Compass Media Networks; Premiere Networks; Cleveland Guardians Radio Network; Ohio State Sports Network

Ownership
- Owner: iHeartMedia, Inc.; (iHM Licenses, LLC)
- Sister stations: WFXN-FM; WMAN; WNCO; WNCO-FM; WSWR; WXXF; WYHT

History
- First air date: September 14, 1987
- Former call signs: WWMZ (1984–86); WJMR (1986–92); WWBK (1992–2005); WXXR (2005–11); WWMM (2011–12)
- Call sign meaning: Mansfield

Technical information
- Licensing authority: FCC
- Facility ID: 50121
- Class: A
- ERP: 860 watts
- HAAT: 189 meters (620 ft)
- Transmitter coordinates: 40°34′58.00″N 82°28′25.00″W

Links
- Public license information: Public file; LMS
- Webcast: Listen live (via iHeartRadio)
- Website: wmanfm.iheart.com

WMAN-FM (98.3 MHz) is a radio station broadcasting a news/talk format as a simulcast of WMAN (1400 AM). Licensed to Fredericktown, Ohio, WMAN-FM serves the Ashland/Mansfield/Mount Vernon Mid-Ohio area. The station is currently owned by iHeartMedia, Inc. and features programing from Fox News Radio, Compass Media Networks, and Premiere Networks.

WMAN-FM (then WWMM)'s simulcast of WMAN was originally a trimulcast with WMAN-FM (now WSWR) which ended on Thursday, May 3, 2012 at noon.

Prior to December 2011, the station was WXXR, which, along with Shelby-licensed WSWR (100.1 FM), programmed a classic hits format branded as "My 100.1/98.3." WSWR also featured an oldies format as "Crusin' 100." The WMAN simulcast began on December 26, 2011. The first local program on the new FM signal was aired on December 26 "Rusty Cates & the WMAN Morning News". The first live high school sports broadcast on the FM signal was aired on Thursday December 29, a girls basketball game played between Clear Fork and Lexington with Josh Bowman on play by play and Rick Durkin as the color commentator.

On May 3, 2012 WMAN-FM 100.1 has split from its simulcast reverted to its previous classic hits format as "My 100.1," with the WSWR calls. WWMM subsequently took the WMAN-FM call letters.

== History ==
WMAN-FM began as WWMZ granted to Fredericktown Ohio under the ownership of Kokosing Communications. In 1986, the call letters were changed to WJMR before signing on as an Adult Contemporary formatted radio station. Kokosing would later sell WJMR to Bohmar Communications in 1992 for $325,000. The station changed from Adult Contemporary to Country under the new ownership and would adopt the call letters WWBK using the K-Country moniker.

In February 1998, the station was sold to Dean Stampfli and his Ashland/Knox Broadcasting for $125,000. The company also owned WFXN-FM/Galion, WQIO-FM/Mt. Vernon, WMVO-AM/Mt. Vernon, WNCO-FM/Ashland, WNCO-AM/Ashland, WXXF-FM/Loudonville. Ashland/Knox Broadcasting would later become Ohio Radio and keep the K-Country brand in place until the sale to Clear Channel Communications for $32 Million where 98.3 WWBK Mount Vernon/Mansfield and WBZW Ashland/Wooster would become KISS-FM Mid Ohio changing to a Top 40 Format.
