= WBTC (AM) =

Radio station in Uhrichsville, Ohio

- Uhrichsville, Ohio; United States
- Broadcast area: Tuscarawas County
- Frequency: 1540 kHz
- Branding: The Tusk 101.9 FM 1540 AM

Programming
- Format: Classic hits
- Affiliations: Pittsburgh Steelers Radio Network; Cleveland Guardians Radio Network; Notre Dame Sports Network

Ownership
- Owner: Brian Walker, Leonard Dugger, and Kevin Willoughby; (WBTC Radio LLC)

History
- First air date: December 13, 1963
- Call sign meaning: "We're Broadcasting From Tuscarawas County"

Technical information
- Licensing authority: FCC
- Facility ID: 68425
- Class: D
- Power: 250 watts (day); 5 watts (night)
- Transmitter coordinates: 40°25′26″N 81°21′47″W
- Translator: 101.9 W270CI (Uhrichsville)

Links
- Public license information: Public file; LMS
- Webcast: Listen live
- Website: wbtcradio.com

WBTC is an AM radio station in Uhrichsville, Ohio, United States, broadcasting on 1540 kHz with a classic hits format.

The station was founded in 1963 by James Natoli and was held in the name of his company, Tuscarawas Broadcasting. Natoli died on June 1, 2017.

WBTC features locally oriented hosts on weekday drive-times: Brad Shupe in mornings and Nathan Cozart in afternoons and Eddie Hawkins Saturdays 8-12. Under its previous talk format, the station also carried locally hosted talk shows Dial-and-Deal with J.R. Richards and Dial-and-Speak conducted by Dr. Andrea Fanti - the only call-in radio show in Tuscarawas County - in addition to The Rush Limbaugh Show and The Sean Hannity Show, and had been an affiliate of Fox Sports Radio for evenings and weekends. In October 2017, WBTC shifted to oldies programming on evenings and weekends, and took the format full-time that November. And now plays the Big Classic hits

Unlike most radio stations in the Northeastern United States assigned to the clear-channel frequency of 1540 kHz (all of whom must sign off at sunset to protect KXEL in Waterloo, Iowa and/or ZNS-1 in Nassau, Bahamas), WBTC has five watts of night power assigned. Prior to adding an FM translator (W270CI 101.9 FM) in 2016, WBTC voluntarily signed off nightly at 9:00 p.m. (give or take live sports play-by-play events), but has since taken a 24-hour program lineup.

WBTC also offers on-line streaming from its web page.

Effective July 8, 2022, Tuscarawas Broadcasting sold WBTC and translator W270CI to WBTC Radio LLC for $50,000.
