= KIXW (AM) =

Radio station in Apple Valley, California

Currently silent
- Apple Valley, California; United States
- Broadcast area: Hesperia-Victorville
- Frequency: 960 kHz
- Branding: Talk 960

Programming
- Format: Conservative talk
- Affiliations: Fox News Radio; Premiere Networks; Westwood One; Fox News Talk; Salem Radio Network

Ownership
- Owner: El Dorado Broadcasters; (EDB VV License LLC)
- Sister stations: KATJ-FM; KIXA; KXVV; KZXY-FM

History
- First air date: June 5, 1954
- Former call signs: KAVR (1954–1988); KZXY (1988–1989); KQKL (1989–1991); KZXY (1991–1995)

Technical information
- Licensing authority: FCC
- Facility ID: 4
- Class: D
- Power: 5,000 watts (day); 20 watts (night)
- Transmitter coordinates: 34°31′0″N 117°13′38.2″W

Links
- Public license information: Public file; LMS
- Website: edbroadcasters.com/talk-960/

KIXW (960 AM, "Talk 960") is a commercial radio station licensed to Apple Valley, California, United States. It broadcast a conservative talk format before going silent in 2026. The station is owned by El Dorado Broadcasters, with studios on Hesperia Road in Victorville and the transmitter off Rincon Road in Apple Valley.

== History ==
On June 5, 1954, the station signed on as KAVR. The call sign stood for "Apple Valley Radio". The station was owned by Newton T. Bass, under the corporate name Apple Valley Broadcasting. KAVR was a daytimer, powered at 5,000 watts, but it had to sign-off at sunset.

In 1998, the station was sold to Crown Broadcasting. At the time, it aired an oldies format. It later switched to a talk radio format.

In the early 2000s, KIXW had a locally based talk program, "The Barb Stanton Show". The show was cancelled in mid-May 2007 after Ms. Stanton made comments on the air regarding what she perceived as the massive influx of Asian-Americans into the Victor Valley. The comments were prompted when she found out that a Victorville-based bank was about to be bought out by Pasadena-based East West Bank, owned by Dominic Ng, a third-generation Asian-American resident of Pasadena.

In 2019, KIXW was under fire once again when host Jeff Duran made controversial comments regarding non-binary and transgender teens. The host was fired and replaced by alternate local paid programming.

In May 2026, KIXW ceased broadcasting. The station's website was replaced with an announcement of the closure, as well as links to the websites of its syndicated programming.
