= WMAN (AM) =

Radio station in Mansfield, Ohio

- Mansfield, Ohio; United States
- Broadcast area: Richland County; Ashland County; Knox County
- Frequency: 1400 kHz
- Branding: FM News Radio 98.3 WMAN

Programming
- Language: English
- Format: News/talk
- Affiliations: Agri Broadcast Network; Cleveland Guardians Radio Network; Compass Media Networks; Fox News Radio; Ohio State Sports Network; Premiere Networks

Ownership
- Owner: iHeartMedia, Inc.; (iHM Licenses, LLC)
- Sister stations: WFXN-FM; WMAN-FM; WNCO; WNCO-FM; WSWR; WXXF; WYHT

History
- First air date: December 29, 1939
- Call sign meaning: Mansfield

Technical information
- Licensing authority: FCC
- Facility ID: 67609
- Class: C
- Power: 920 watts unlimited
- Transmitter coordinates: 40°46′13″N 82°32′36″W
- Repeater: 98.3 WMAN-FM (Fredericktown)

Links
- Public license information: Public file; LMS
- Webcast: Listen live (via iHeartRadio)
- Website: wmanfm.iheart.com

WMAN (1400 kHz) is an AM radio station broadcasting a news/talk format. Licensed to Mansfield, Ohio, United States, the station serves the Mid-Ohio area. The station is currently owned by iHeartMedia, Inc. and features programming from Fox News Radio, Fox Sports Radio and Premiere Radio Networks.

The station was first licensed December 29, 1939. Since December 26, 2011, WMAN simulcasts on WMAN-FM (98.3 FM), with WMAN-FM now taking top priority in station branding.

Former WMAN logo, before adding simulcasts on FM. For a time before the simulcast, WMAN used a version of the current logo referencing only the AM frequency.
