= WTNS-FM =

Radio station in Coshocton, Ohio

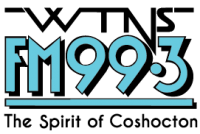
- Coshocton, Ohio; United States
- Broadcast area: Millersburg, Ohio; Newcomerstown, Ohio
- Frequency: 99.3 MHz
- Branding: WTNS FM 99.3

Programming
- Format: Adult contemporary
- Affiliations: AP News; Ohio State Sports Network

Ownership
- Owner: Coshocton Broadcasting Co.
- Sister stations: WTNS

History
- First air date: April 25, 1968

Technical information
- Licensing authority: FCC
- Facility ID: 13983
- Class: A
- ERP: 1,200 watts
- HAAT: 134.0 meters (439.6 ft)
- Transmitter coordinates: 40°16′30.00″N 81°49′37.00″W

Links
- Public license information: Public file; LMS
- Webcast: Listen live
- Website: WTNS website

WTNS-FM (99.3 MHz) is a radio station broadcasting an adult contemporary format. Licensed to Coshocton, Ohio, United States, the station is currently owned by Coshocton Broadcasting Co.
