= WXXF =

Radio station in Loudonville, Ohio

- Loudonville, Ohio; United States
- Broadcast area: Richland County; Crawford County; Morrow County
- Frequency: 107.7 MHz
- Branding: 107.7 The Breeze

Programming
- Language: English
- Format: Soft adult contemporary
- Affiliations: Premiere Networks

Ownership
- Owner: iHeartMedia, Inc.; (iHM Licenses, LLC)
- Sister stations: WFXN-FM; WMAN; WMAN-FM; WNCO; WNCO-FM; WSWR; WYHT

History
- First air date: March 30, 1990
- Former call signs: WLMA (1988–89); WBZW (1989–2005)
- Call sign meaning: "Fox" spelled backwards, onetime WFXN simulcast

Technical information
- Licensing authority: FCC
- Facility ID: 33066
- Class: A
- ERP: 4,200 watts
- HAAT: 119 meters (390 ft)
- Transmitter coordinates: 40°40′19.70″N 82°18′15.00″W

Links
- Public license information: Public file; LMS
- Webcast: Listen live (via iHeartRadio)
- Website: thebreeze1077.iheart.com

WXXF (107.7 FM) – branded 107.7 The Breeze – is a commercial soft adult contemporary radio station licensed to Loudonville, Ohio. Owned by iHeartMedia, Inc., WXXF primarily serves the Mid-Ohio counties of Richland, Crawford, Morrow, Holmes, Ashland, and Wayne. The studios for WXXF are located in Mansfield, while the station transmitter resides in Perrysville. Besides a standard analog transmission, the station is available online via iHeartRadio.

Formerly a full-power repeater of Galion sister station WFXN-FM, WXXF stunted with Christmas music in preparation for a new format to debut on December 26, 2019.

== History ==
WXXF-FM began as WBZW in March 1990.

After a failed attempt to win the construction permit for WKLM in Millersburg, Esther Martin of Apple Creek won the 107.7 Loudonville frequency as Holmes Radio. In 1991, WBZW Loudonville signed on airing a Smooth Jazz and Adult Contemporary format targeting Wooster and competing against Dix Communications owned WQKT. The station became Charter Communications under the direction of Martin's son Donald after serving as General Manager of several Washington DC area radio stations. Studios were located at 127 North Water Street in downtown Loudonville.

In December 1994, the station was sold to K-Country Communications with Mark Bohach for $384,000 who changed the format to simulcast new sister radio station 98.3 WMAN-FM and moved studios to 115 South Water Street in Loudonville. In 1998 Bohach sold both stations to Dean Stampfli's Ashland Broadcasting for $1.15 Million. Ashland Broadcasting owned WNCO (AM) and WNCO-FM in Ashland, and would eventually become the largest broadcast owner in the state of Ohio prior to its sale to iHeartMedia, Inc. in 2000 for $32 million. In 2001, the Loudonville and Fredericktown stations became Top 40-formatted "KISS-FM Mid-Ohio", while sister WYHT shifted to Hot adult contemporary. The format lasted nearly five years before becoming classic rock as "107.7 The Fox", trimulcasting with now sister WFXN-FM.

On November 6, 2019, WXXF split from the simulcast with WFXN-FM and began stunting with Christmas music as "Christmas 107.7". On December 26, WXXF flipped to a soft adult contemporary format, branded as "107.7 The Breeze".
