= KIXA =

Radio station in Lucerne Valley, California

- Lucerne Valley, California; United States
- Broadcast area: Victorville-Hesperia, California
- Frequency: 106.5 MHz
- Branding: 106.5 The Fox

Programming
- Format: Classic rock
- Affiliations: United Stations Radio Networks; Westwood One

Ownership
- Owner: El Dorado Broadcasters, LLC; (EDB VV License LLC)
- Sister stations: KATJ-FM; KIXW; KXVV; KZXY-FM

History
- First air date: November 1992

Technical information
- Licensing authority: FCC
- Facility ID: 55181
- Class: A
- ERP: 560 watts
- HAAT: 325 meters (1,066 ft)
- Transmitter coordinates: 34°23′9″N 117°3′27.1″W

Links
- Public license information: Public file; LMS

KIXA (106.5 FM) is a commercial radio station licensed to Lucerne Valley, California, United States, and serving the Victor Valley. Owned by El Dorado Broadcasters, it airs a classic rock format branded as "106.5 The Fox". KIXA's transmitter is sited off of Grapevine Canyon Road in Lucerne Valley, while the studios are on Hesperia Road in Hesperia.

== History ==
The station signed on the air in November 1992. It was operated as "KIX 106", a country music station, for six years.

In 1998, KIXA flipped to "Rock 106", where the station played a mix of classic rock from the 1960s and 1970s along with alternative rock from the 1980s and 1990s. The station was simulcast on KIXW-FM and KIXF-FM to cover the Victor Valley, Barstow and Baker. When the rock format ended on 106.5 in 2002, Clear Channel Communications sold off the Barstow and Baker stations to Westwood One, which later sold them to Heftel Broadcasting. KIXA was relaunched as a full-time classic rock station.

Since 2002, KIXA has been branded as "The Fox". The focus has been rock songs from the 1970s and 1980s with a few 1960s titles. After Clear Channel sold the station to El Dorado Broadcasters in 2006, KIXA updated its classic rock presentation to include music from the 1960s to the early 1990s, while mostly excluding alternative rock.
