= KVTR =

- Victorville, California; United States
- Broadcast area: Victor Valley, California
- Frequency: 1590 kHz
- Branding: Qué Buena 106.1 FM

Programming
- Format: Regional Mexican

Ownership
- Owner: RuDex Broadcasting; (RuDex Broadcasting Limited Corporation)

History
- First air date: September 1, 1961
- Former call signs: KCIN (1961–1995); KROY (1995–2001); KATJ (2001–2003); KRSX (2003–2013)
- Call sign meaning: Victorville

Technical information
- Licensing authority: FCC
- Facility ID: 29226
- Class: D
- Power: 500 watts (day); 131 watts (night)
- Transmitter coordinates: 34°32′15″N 117°18′45.2″W
- Translator: 106.1 K291CM (Victorville)

Links
- Public license information: Public file; LMS
- Webcast: Listen live

KVTR (1590 AM, "Qué Buena 106.1 FM") is a commercial radio station that is licensed to Victorville, California and serves the Victor Valley area. The station is owned by RuDex Broadcasting and broadcasts a regional Mexican music format branded as "Qué Buena 106.1 FM", referring to its three-watt FM translator K291CM on 106.1 MHz in Victorville.

== History ==
The station first went on-air September 1, 1961, as KCIN, a 500-watt daytimer originally owned by Victor Valley Broadcasters. In 1966, Top-Dial Broadcasters bought the station for $66,000; that company sold it to Dynamic Radio Broadcasting, led by Roger P. Brandt, for twice that amount in 1976. In 1978, Sidney King purchased KCIN for $160,000.

In August 1989, King's Crown Broadcasting attempted to sell KCIN and sister station KATJ-FM (100.7 FM) to Victor Valley Broadcasting (a different entity from the aforementioned company) for $1.36 million. The potential buyer was a company led by Kenneth Devine, Peter Trosclair, and John Binsfield, all partners in a New Orleans–based engineering company. However, that transaction was unsuccessful. Crown then struck a deal with Island Broadcasting Corporation, headed by Scott Brady and Richard Sadowsky, in October 1990 to purchase the combo for $1.575 million. The Federal Communications Commission (FCC) approved the transfer of both stations' licenses to the new owner December 21.

In January 1995, Island Broadcasting sold KCIN and KATJ-FM to Park Lane Group for $1.8 million. The new owner flipped the station from oldies to country music and changed its call letters to KROY in honor of country musician Roy Rogers, who lived in nearby Apple Valley. KROY also aired live coverage of the High Desert Mavericks, a now-defunct Minor League Baseball team playing in the California League.

In June 1997, Regent Communications purchased Park Lane Group's 16 stations in California and Arizona, including KROY, for a total of $23.5 million.

In April 2000, Clear Channel Communications proposed a complex station swap with Regent Communications which would have involved 20 stations nationwide, including KROY, and a payment of over $67 million by Regent to Clear Channel. This deal was one of many divestitures required of Clear Channel and AMFM, Inc. by the FCC as a condition of their merger, in order to satisfy ownership caps in each affected media market. While this exchange was not implemented fully, Clear Channel did acquire KROY and KATJ-FM. The call sign changed to KATJ in 2001, then to KRSX in 2003, and finally to KVTR in 2013.
