= WCRZ =

- Flint, Michigan; United States
- Frequency: 107.9 MHz (HD Radio)
- Branding: Cars 108

Programming
- Format: Adult contemporary
- Affiliations: Compass Media Networks; Premiere Networks

Ownership
- Owner: Townsquare Media; (Townsquare Media of Flint, Inc.)
- Sister stations: WQUS, WRCL, WWBN

History
- First air date: November 4, 1961
- Former call signs: WGMZ-FM (1961–1984)
- Call sign meaning: Flint's auto industry

Technical information
- Licensing authority: FCC
- Facility ID: 20446
- Class: B
- ERP: 50,000 watts
- HAAT: 101 meters (331 ft)
- Transmitter coordinates: 42°58′49″N 83°34′40″W

Links
- Public license information: Public file; LMS
- Webcast: Listen live
- Website: wcrz.com

WCRZ (107.9 FM, "Cars 108") is a commercial radio station licensed to Flint, Michigan, United States, broadcasting an adult contemporary format. WCRZ is the top-rated heritage station in the market. Its studios and offices are on East Bristol Road in Burton, east of Flint.

WCRZ-FM's transmitter is located on South Vassar Road near East Bristol Road in Burton. It also broadcasts using HD Radio technology, and formerly aired a simulcast of WQUS on its second digital subchannel, which was discontinued after a format flip in 2026.

== History ==
=== WGMZ-FM ===
On November 4, 1961, the station signed on as WGMZ-FM. It had a long-running and successful MOR/easy listening format. The station played quarter-hour sweeps of soft, instrumental music, mostly cover versions of popular songs, as well as Broadway and Hollywood show tunes.

WGMZ-FM was originally co-owned with WAMM-AM (now WFLT-AM). The owner of WAMM-AM at that time sold WGMZ-FM in 1966. By 1968, WGMZ-FM was co-owned with WKMF-AM (now WFNT-AM).

=== WCRZ-FM ===
On June 25, 1984 at 1 am, the call sign changed to WCRZ-FM and the format became adult contemporary. "Fame" by Irene Cara was the first song played in the new format. The call letters WGMZ-FM were assumed by a station in Tuscola, Michigan, three years later, and that station is known today as WWBN-FM, and has been a sister station to WCRZ since the mid-1990s.

Since the mid-1990s, WCRZ-FM has been the number one radio station in Flint, off and on, and was the first station in the market to broadcast in high definition. Since then, sister stations WWBN-FM and WRCL have also added HD broadcasting, as has competing station WDZZ-AM.

=== Vandalization ===
In the Spring of 1995, WCRZ-FM went off the air for some time due to a vandalizing of the station's transmitting antenna. During this time, the frequency of 107.9 was dark for roughly a week. However, sister station 101.7 (now 101.5) WWBN-FM allowed WCRZ-FM to share signals until repairs were made on the antenna.

=== Jingles ===
WCRZ-FM's jingle melody was adapted from KVIL-FM in Dallas, Texas. For much of the 1990s, JAM Creative Productions produced WCRZ-FM's jingles; it was TM Century that chose to sing the station's nickname, "Cars 108" to the melody of KVIL-FM. For over a decade, however, WCRZ-FM's jingles have been by TM Studios.

The KVIL-FM jingles were originally produced from the TM Century package "KVIL: The '90s". KVIL-FM in the Dallas/Fort Worth, Texas market first aired that jingle package in January 1991 and continued to do so until Late Spring or Early Summer 1993, when JAM introduced the "Celebrate" package for that station. Before that time, however, that jingle package was first tested by TM on a radio station in country of Japan in late 1990, but TM later decided to shift the jingle package to American radio stations, just so that they could more easily syndicate that package to radio stations in several American markets. Following that, the "Memphis' Best Music" package from Thompson Creative was used.

Jam Jingles were not used until the mid/late 1990s, and the package was Q95-Detroit's "Q Cuts" and "Quick Qs." Cars 108 returned to the KVIL packages from TM Century around the turn of the century. In 2008, Cars 108 had a custom jingle package produced by the world-famous jingle expert, Johnny Hooper. The RadioScape Package, simply called "Cars 108," was originally produced in 2008, with 5 new cuts added in 2010. The current jingle package is another adaptation of a KVIL-FM jingle package, which is the "103.7 Lite FM"-era jingle package produced by Reelworld Productions.
