= WFXN-FM =

Radio station in Galion, Ohio

- Galion, Ohio; United States
- Broadcast area: Richland County; Crawford County; Morrow County
- Frequency: 102.3 MHz
- Branding: 102.3 The Fox

Programming
- Language: English
- Format: Mainstream rock
- Affiliations: Premiere Networks; United Stations Radio Networks

Ownership
- Owner: iHeartMedia, Inc.; (iHM Licenses, LLC)
- Sister stations: WMAN; WMAN-FM; WNCO; WNCO-FM; WSWR; WXXF; WYHT

History
- First air date: November 8, 1974
- Former call signs: WQLX (1974–1997); WGLN (1997–2002); WFXN (2002–2003); WXFN-FM (2003)
- Call sign meaning: "Fox"

Technical information
- Licensing authority: FCC
- Facility ID: 39730
- Class: A
- ERP: 3,500 watts
- HAAT: 131 meters (430 ft)
- Transmitter coordinates: 40°45′26.00″N 82°47′23.00″W

Links
- Public license information: Public file; LMS
- Webcast: Listen live (via iHeartRadio)
- Website: wfxnthefox.iheart.com

WFXN-FM (102.3 FM, "102.3 The Fox") is a commercial mainstream rock radio station licensed to Galion, Ohio, United States. Owned by iHeartMedia, Inc., WFXN-FM primarily services the Mid-Ohio counties of Richland, Crawford, and Morrow, and is the local affiliate for Rover's Morning Glory and The House of Hair with Dee Snider. The WFXN-FM studios are located in Mansfield, while the station transmitter resides in Galion. Besides a standard analog transmission, the station is available online via iHeartRadio.

== History ==
WFXN-FM began as WQLX on November 8, 1974. At first, WQLX simulcast WGLX (1570 AM) under the ownership of Harry Gray's Radio Galion. After only owning the station for one year, Gray had a heart attack at the age of 58, the control of the station was transferred to Joseph Billow until a sale could take place. In 1976, Maumee Valley Broadcasting owned by Ray Malone for $166,000. Malone would own the station along with sister WGLX and WNDH in Napoleon before selling in 1996 to Dean Stampfli's Ashland/Knox Broadcasting for $161,000. In 1997, Ohio Radio Group (née Ashland/Knox) changed the station's callsign to WGLN. On October 2, 2000, Clear Channel purchased Ohio Radio Group which included WQIO and WMVO in Mount Vernon, Ohio, WWBK in Fredericktown, Ohio, WBZW in Loudonville, Ohio, and WNCO and WNCO-FM in Ashland, Ohio. Over the next two years, the station callsign changed three times: in 2002 to WFXN; in 2003 to WXFN-FM; and again in 2003, to WFXN-FM.

On Labor Day 2017, an EF-2 tornado caused the broadcast tower for WFXN in Galion to collapse.

WFXN-FM also extended its signal by using a single full-power repeater. Licensed to Loudonville, WXXF (107.7 FM, the former WBZW) provided additional coverage to the Mid-Ohio counties of Holmes, Ashland, and Wayne. On November 6, 2019, WXXF split from the simulcast with WFXN-FM and began stunting with Christmas music as "Christmas 107.7"; it switched to a soft adult contemporary format that December.

== Current programming ==
In addition to its mainstream rock format, WFXN-FM airs Rover's Morning Glory on weekday mornings, and The House of Hair with Dee Snider on Sunday night.
