= KZXY-FM =

Radio station in Apple Valley, California

- Apple Valley, California; United States
- Broadcast area: Hesperia, California
- Frequency: 102.3 MHz
- Branding: Y102

Programming
- Format: Hot adult contemporary
- Affiliations: Compass Media Networks; Premiere Networks

Ownership
- Owner: El Dorado Broadcasters; (EDB VV License LLC)
- Sister stations: KATJ-FM; KIXA; KIXW; KXVV

History
- First air date: May 17, 1968
- Former call signs: KAVR-FM (1968–1981); KAPV (1981–1985); KAVR-FM (1985-1988

Technical information
- Licensing authority: FCC
- Facility ID: 57920
- Class: A
- ERP: 6,000 watts
- HAAT: 100 meters (330 ft)
- Transmitter coordinates: 34.411°N 117.187°W

Links
- Public license information: Public file; LMS
- Website: www.y102fm.com

KZXY-FM (102.3 MHz) is a commercial radio station that is licensed to Apple Valley, California and serves the Victor Valley region of the Mojave Desert, in San Bernardino County. The station is owned by El Dorado Broadcasters and airs a hot adult contemporary music format. The KZXY-FM studios are located in the city of Victorville.

== History ==
=== KAVR-FM/KAPV ===
The station first signed on May 17, 1968, as KAVR-FM. Owned by BHA Enterprises, it was the FM sister station to KAVR (960 AM) and broadcast a middle of the road music format.

On September 15, 1972, BHA Enterprises sold KAVR-AM-FM to Phoenix Broadcasters Corporation Ltd. for $423,750. Gerald F. Hicks, president of BHA, held a 4.7% interest in the purchasing party. However, on October 11, 1973, the Federal Communications Commission (FCC) blocked the transaction and scheduled a hearing on whether the stations' licenses should be revoked, citing Hicks' obtaining a majority of BHA's stock without FCC approval. On November 5, 1974, an administrative law judge recommended the revocation of BHA's licenses to the stations.

In December 1981, KAVR-FM changed its call sign to KAPV. The station reverted to the original KAVR-FM call letters in September 1985.

=== KZXY-FM ===
In October 1987, BHA Enterprises Ltd., now controlled by Dick Schofield, sold KAVR-AM-FM to Crown Broadcasting, owned by Ron Strother, for $1.7 million. At the time, the FM station carried a country music format. The FCC approved the transfer of licenses on December 18. The new owner, also known as Ruby Broadcasting and controlled by Tom Gammon, changed KAVR-FM's call sign to KZXY-FM in June 1988.

In December 1997, Regent Communications purchased KZXY-FM, its longtime AM sister station now called KIXW, and KIXA from Ruby Broadcasting for $8 million.

In April 2000, Clear Channel Communications proposed a complex station swap with Regent Communications which would have involved 20 stations nationwide, including KZXY-FM, and a payment of over $67 million by Regent to Clear Channel. This deal was one of many divestitures required of Clear Channel and AMFM, Inc. by the FCC as a condition of their merger, in order to satisfy ownership caps in each affected media market. While this exchange was not implemented fully, Clear Channel did acquire the adult contemporary-formatted KZXY-FM and its AM sister station KIXW.

From 2001 to 2002, KZXY and its hot adult contemporary music format were simulcast on sister KYHT (105.3 FM) in Yermo, California; together, the two stations were branded as "Y 102 & 105".

In June 2007, Clear Channel sold 16 stations in California and Arizona, including KZXY-FM, to El Dorado Broadcasters for $40 million.

Syndicated programming on KZXY-FM includes The John Tesh Radio Show and American Top 40 hosted by Ryan Seacrest.
