= WNCO (AM) =

Radio station in Ashland, Ohio

- Ashland, Ohio; United States
- Broadcast area: Ashland County; Richland County; Knox County
- Frequency: 1340 kHz
- Branding: Fox Sports Radio 1340

Programming
- Language: English
- Format: Sports
- Affiliations: Fox Sports Radio; Premiere Networks; Ashland University Eagles

Ownership
- Owner: iHeartMedia, Inc.; (iHM Licenses, LLC)
- Sister stations: WFXN-FM; WMAN; WMAN-FM; WNCO-FM; WSWR; WXXF; WYHT

History
- First air date: May 18, 1950
- Former call signs: WATG (1950–1959)
- Call sign meaning: North Central Ohio

Technical information
- Licensing authority: FCC
- Facility ID: 2926
- Class: C
- Power: 1,000 watts unlimited
- Transmitter coordinates: 40°50′25″N 82°21′26″W

Links
- Public license information: Public file; LMS
- Webcast: Listen live (via iHeartRadio)
- Website: wncoam.iheart.com

WNCO (1340 AM, "Fox Sports 1340") is a commercial radio station licensed to Ashland, Ohio, United States. The station serves Ashland, Mansfield and Bucyrus, collectively identified as the Mid-Ohio region. The station is under ownership of iHeartMedia, Inc.

Since September 10, 2012, WNCO runs a sports format, airing content from Fox Sports Radio and Premiere Radio Networks. It originally aired an adult standards and oldies music format from Citadel Media's Timeless satellite feed until June 14, 2009, when it switched to an all-talk format.

It is also the flagship station for Ashland University Eagles football.

The station signed on May 18, 1950, as WATG, owned by Ashland Broadcasting Corp. headed by R. S. Burke. It was acquired by Radio Ashland, Inc. on January 15, 1957 and became WNCO two years later.
