= WNCO-FM =

Radio station in Ashland, Ohio

- Ashland, Ohio; United States
- Broadcast area: Ashland County; Richland County; Knox County
- Frequency: 101.3 MHz
- Branding: 101.3 WNCO

Programming
- Language: English
- Format: Country music
- Affiliations: Premiere Networks

Ownership
- Owner: iHeartMedia, Inc.; (iHM Licenses, LLC)
- Sister stations: WFXN-FM; WMAN; WMAN-FM; WNCO; WSWR; WXXF; WYHT

History
- First air date: May 18, 1947; 78 years ago
- Former call signs: WATG-FM (1947–1958)
- Call sign meaning: North Central Ohio

Technical information
- Licensing authority: FCC
- Facility ID: 2925
- Class: B
- ERP: 50,000 watts
- HAAT: 152.0 meters (498.7 ft)
- Transmitter coordinates: 40°50′25.00″N 82°21′26.00″W

Links
- Public license information: Public file; LMS
- Webcast: Listen live (via iHeartRadio)
- Website: 1013wnco.iheart.com

WNCO-FM (101.3 MHz) is a radio station broadcasting a country music format. Licensed to Ashland, Ohio, United States, the station serves the Mid-Ohio area. The station is currently owned by iHeartMedia, Inc. and features programming from Premiere Networks.

== History ==
Then called WATG-FM, the station began broadcasting May 18, 1947, on 100.7 MHz width. It was owned by Robert M. Beer and Edgar Koehl, publishers of the Ashland Times-Gazette.
