= Dispatch Broadcast Group =

American media company

- Type: Subsidiary
- Industry: Broadcast television and radio production
- Founded: 1929
- Defunct: August 8, 2019
- Fate: Acquired by Tegna
- Headquarters: Columbus, Ohio, United States
- Area served: Central Indiana; Central Ohio
- Parent: Dispatch Printing Company

The Dispatch Broadcast Group was a media company based in Columbus, Ohio. The group was a division of the Dispatch Printing Company, former owner of the Columbus Dispatch, and was owned by the Wolfe family since 1929 until its sale to Tegna Inc. in mid-2019.

The Dispatch Broadcast Group included the Columbus CBS-affiliate WBNS television, radio stations WBNS (AM) and WBNS-FM in Columbus, the statewide Ohio News Network, and NBC-affiliate WTHR television in Indianapolis (formerly WLW-I) which was purchased in 1975.

On April 24, 2013, former WBNS-TV news director John Cardenas was named president and general manager of the station and vice president of broadcast news for the Dispatch Broadcast Group. On December 7, 2018, Dispatch Broadcast Group president and WTHR general manager Larry Delia commented to the Indianapolis Business Journal that the company may consider buying divested Nexstar Media Group stations as Nexstar readies to buy Tribune Media.

On June 11, 2019, it was reported the Dispatch Broadcast Group had sold its television and radio assets to Tegna Inc. for the sale price of $535 million. The sale was completed on August 8.
