= Columbus Blue Jackets Radio Network =

American sports broadcast radio network

- Type: Radio network
- Country: United States
- Headquarters: Columbus, Ohio
- Broadcast area: Ohio; West Virginia (limited)
- Owner: Columbus Blue Jackets
- Established: 2000
- Affiliation: NHL
- Affiliates: 21 (including 2 flagships and 1 alternate flagship)
- Official website: www.nhl.com/bluejackets/multimedia/radio-network

The Eldorado Gaming Scioto Downs Columbus Blue Jackets Radio Network is an American radio network consisting of 36 radio stations which carry coverage of the Columbus Blue Jackets, a professional hockey team in the National Hockey League.

Columbus radio stations WBNS (1460 AM) and WBNS-FM (97.1 FM) serve as the network's two flagship stations; WODC (93.3 FM) also serves as an alternate flagship in the event of schedule overlaps with Ohio State Sports Network football or basketball programming on both WBNS and WBNS-FM. The network also includes 18 affiliates in the U.S. states of Ohio and West Virginia: 14 AM stations, 8 of which extend their signals with low-power FM translators; and 4 full-power FM stations.

Bob McElligott serves as the play-by-play announcer; in addition to his duties, McElligott also handles the pre- and post-game shows alongside Dylan Tyrer. Eldorado Gaming Scioto Downs racino owns the naming rights to the network.

== Station list ==
List of Columbus Blue Jackets Radio Network affiliates
Call sign	Frequency	Band	City	State	Network status
WBNS	1460	AM	Columbus	Ohio	Flagship
WBNS-FM	97.1	FM	Columbus	Ohio	Flagship
WODC	93.3	FM	Columbus	Ohio	Alternate Flagship*
WNCO	1340	AM	Ashland	Ohio	Affiliate
WBEX	1490	AM	Chillicothe	Ohio	Affiliate
W224BR	92.7	FM	Chillicothe	Ohio	WBEX relay
WSAI	1360	AM	Cincinnati	Ohio	Affiliate
WING	1410	AM	Dayton	Ohio	Affiliate
WJER	1450	AM	Dover–New Phila.	Ohio	Affiliate
W265DL	100.9	FM	Dover–New Phila.	Ohio	WJER relay
WFIN	1330	AM	Findlay	Ohio	Affiliate
W238CX	95.5	FM	Findlay	Ohio	WFIN relay
WFOB	1430	AM	Fostoria	Ohio	Affiliate
WBVI	96.7	FM	Fostoria	Ohio	Affiliate
W289CP	105.7	FM	Fostoria	Ohio	WFOB relay
WMOH	1450	AM	Hamilton	Ohio	Affiliate
WKTN	95.3	FM	Kenton	Ohio	Affiliate
WWSR	93.1	FM	Lima	Ohio	Affiliate
WMOA	1490	AM	Marietta	Ohio	Affiliate
W267CQ	101.3	FM	Marietta	Ohio	WMOA relay
WMRN	1490	AM	Marion	Ohio	Affiliate
WDLR	1270	AM	Marysville	Ohio	Affiliate
W244DV	96.7	FM	Marysville	Ohio	WDLR relay
WJAW-FM	100.9	FM	McConnelsville	Ohio	Affiliate
WLTP	910	AM	Parkersburg	West Virginia	Affiliate
W295DM	106.9	FM	Point Pleasant	West Virginia	WMOV relay
WMOV	1360	AM	Ravenswood	West Virginia	Affiliate
W228DJ	93.5	FM	Ravenswood	West Virginia	WMOV relay
WINT	1330	AM	Willoughby	Ohio	Affiliate
W268CO	101.5	FM	Willoughby	Ohio	WINT relay

Blue background indicates low-power FM translator.
* WODC serves as an "overflow" flagship station in the event of schedule overlaps with Ohio State Sports Network programming on WBNS-FM.

=== Network map(s) ===
- Network stations in Ohio and West Virginia.
- Flagship stations
- Affiliates (not including translators)
