= CBS Columbus =

CBS Columbus can refer to:

- WBNS-TV, the CBS television affiliate in Columbus, Ohio
- WBNS (AM), a former CBS-affiliated radio station in Columbus, Ohio
- WRBL, the CBS television affiliate in Columbus, Georgia
