= WBNS =

WBNS may refer to the following radio and television stations that are licensed to Columbus, Ohio, United States:

- WBNS (AM), a radio station (1460 AM)
- WBNS-FM, a radio station (97.1 FM)
- WBNS-TV, a television station (channel 21 digital, formerly channel 10 analog)
