= WEZY =

WEZY may mean:

- WEZY (FM), a radio station (105.7 FM) licensed to serve Chippewa Falls, Wisconsin, United States
- WEZY-LD, a low-power television station (channel 18, virtual 11) licensed to serve Delphi, Indiana, United States; see List of television stations in Indiana
- WAUN (AM), a radio station (1350 AM) licensed to serve Portage, Wisconsin, United States, which held the call sign WEZY from 2021 to 2022
- WPDR-LD, a low-power television station (channel 35) licensed to serve Tomah, Wisconsin, United States, which held the call sign WEZY-LP from 2015 to 2021
- WVTY, a radio station (92.1 FM) licensed to serve Racine, Wisconsin, United States, which held the call sign WEZY from 1995 to 2014
- WLLD, a radio station (94.1 FM) licensed to serve Lakeland, Florida, United States, which held the call sign WEZY-FM from 1988 to 1995
- WMMV, a radio station (1350 AM) licensed to serve Cocoa, Florida, United States, which held the call sign WEZY from 1957 to 1978 and 1982 to 1988
- WLRQ-FM, a radio station (99.3 FM) licensed to serve Cocoa, Florida, United States, which held the call signs WEZY-FM and WEZY from 1965 to 1988
