= ONN (radio) =

Ohio News Network (ONN)
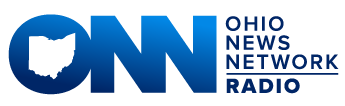
- Country: United States
- Broadcast area: Ohio
- Headquarters: Columbus, Ohio

Programming
- Language: English

Ownership
- Owner: Tegna Inc., a subsidiary of Nexstar Media Group
- Sister channels: WBNS-TV, WKYC-TV, WTOL-TV, WBNS-FM, WBNS (AM)

History
- Launched: 1996

Links
- Website: https://www.onnradio.com/

The Ohio News Network (ONN) – also referred to as ONN Radio – is a radio news service in the U.S. state of Ohio. Based at Columbus, Ohio radio station WBNS-FM and owned by the Tegna Inc. subsidiary of Nexstar Media Group, it provides statewide newscasts and sportscasts for 70 affiliate stations on 100 frequencies throughout the day, in addition to some seasonal long-form programming.

ONN has its origins as a cable news channel of the same name, which operated from 1996 to 2012 in more than 1.8 million households statewide. Its studios and offices are co-located with sister station WBNS-TV, the CBS television affiliate for Columbus and central Ohio. On July 25, 2012, ONN television announced it would be ceasing operations due to changing consumer habits, effective August 31, while ONN Radio would remain in service.

ONN TV closed at 12:00 with the last programming being a farewell looking at the history of ONN.

== Awards ==
ONN is regularly awarded for its outstanding news and programs regionally and nationally.

In 2008, ONN was presented the Emmy Award for Station Excellence in local programming to station managers Tom Griesdorn and Jason Pheister.

In 2009, ONN received nine awards in the Ohio Associated Press contest including: Outstanding Sports Operation; Best Regularly Scheduled Sports; and Best Anchor Mike Kallmeyer. ONN was the runner-up for Outstanding News Operation in Ohio.

== Former Television Channel Programming ==
=== News programming ===
With the slogan "Ohio's Channel", ONN featured news relevant to the state. Daily newscasts included: Ohio This Morning, Ohio Today, Ohio Tonight, Ohio's 9 O'clock News, and Primetime Ohio. Regular segments included sports, weather, business, environmental, political, and health. A special in-depth report on a topic of statewide interest was featured each Thursday night during Ohio's 9 o'clock news. ONN's "Weather on the 10's" was a statewide weather update every 10 minutes.

Capital Square was the longest running political television program in Ohio. The show offered discussion of government in Ohio and Washington, D.C. Capitol Square regularly featured the top newsmakers, who were questioned by moderator Jim Heath. Capital Square was once a Sunday fixture for WBNS-TV in the 1990s until it moved to ONN.

ONN also included election updates throughout the state on major election days or for special elections that affected a large portion of the state.

=== Non-news programming ===
ONN and Ohio State University co-sponsored Ohio Means Business, a thirty-minute program showcasing companies and individuals in Ohio's business world. The program was hosted by ONN anchor Mike Kallmeyer. A new episode aired every other week.

ONN aired weekly Discover Ohio shows that profiled great getaways and destinations across Ohio. The show was hosted by Mykkia Cameron, a former news reporter. The show was nominated for an Emmy Award in 2008.

To target younger viewers, the network aired The Brain Game each Thursday evening; the show featured high school students in a quiz bowl setting. The show was sponsored by Westfield Insurance, an Ohio company. Mike Kallmeyer was the host. The show was nominated for an Emmy Award in 2009.

Ohio and Company featured businesses from across the state in a brief highlight segment. Chef Tami was a weekly cooking show that features the antics of regional celebrity chef Tami Cecil from her Woodhaven Farm in Johnstown, Ohio.

=== Sports programming ===
Major League Soccer Columbus Crew matches were telecast on ONN from 2005-2011. Dwight Burgess was play-by-play commentator while Duncan Oughton was the most recent color commentator for all league matches. Katie Witham was the first sideline reporter, being replaced by Ashleigh Ignelzi when Katie's then-Cleveland Indians commitment took over. Beginning in 2010, select games were available in HDTV on Time Warner Cable in Columbus on HD Channel 1310 or 1311. Following the 2011 season, the Columbus Crew signed a deal with FOX Sports Ohio.

Many Ohio High School Athletic Association events, including hockey, football, and basketball were aired on ONN. ONN also aired weekly programming devoted to the Ohio State Buckeyes, Cincinnati Bearcats, and Miami Redhawks including live and tape delayed games.

ONN was one of the first TV networks to deliver live action sports video via Internet Protocol during the 2006-2007 school year for Miami Redhawks hockey. The team finished the 2008-2009 season at the Frozen Four with a 4-3 OT loss to Boston University in the championship.

=== Partnerships ===
ONN delivered the top statewide stories each day utilizing partnerships with news stations: WBNS in Columbus, WKBN in Youngstown, WEWS in Cleveland, WHIO in Dayton, WKRC in Cincinnati, WTOV in Steubenville/Wheeling, WTVG in Toledo, and WLIO in Lima. In addition, many ONN stories were seen daily on these stations.

ONN had rebroadcast local news programs during the afternoon in cooperation with its affiliates in other Ohio markets. In addition to local news produced by Dispatch sister station WBNS, ONN aired local newscasts from WEWS in Cleveland, WKRC in Cincinnati and WTVG in Toledo on a slightly delayed basis.

== ONN Radio ==
Despite the sunsetting of the TV division, ONN Radio still provides statewide newscasts and sportscasts for affiliate stations during the day, anchored by staffers from WBNS-FM. Long form programming includes the seasonal High School Football Tonight and College Football Today, both hosted by WBNS-FM's Skip Mosic.

ONN Radio is distributed by Radio Ohio Incorporated, which is also owned and operated by Tegna, Inc. Radio Ohio Incorporated distributes various programming elements for radio stations, including live play-by-play broadcasts from the Columbus Blue Jackets Radio Network, the Ohio State Sports Network, and the Cleveland Cavaliers Radio Network.

== Notable former on-air staff ==
- Marjorie Vincent — anchor
- John Fortney — anchor

== Cable carriage ==
Three cable providers in the state of Ohio did not carry ONN at the time of ONN's closure:

- Buckeye Cable System (Toledo)
- Massillon Cable TV, Inc.
- Comcast
