= Tegna Inc. =

American media company

- Type: Subsidiary
- Traded as: NYSE: TGNA
- Predecessor: Broadcasting arm of the Gannett Company
- Founded: June 29, 2015; 11 years ago
- Fate: Acquired by Nexstar Media Group, integration temporarily halted
- Headquarters: McLean, Virginia, U.S.
- Key people: Howard D. Elias (chairman); Patrick Paolini (president and CEO)
- Products: Television; Internet media; Digital marketing services
- Revenue: ▼US$2.71 billion (2025)
- Operating income: ▼US$443 million (2025)
- Net income: ▼US$220 million (2025)
- Total assets: ▼US$6.87 billion (2025)
- Total equity: ▲US$3.16 billion (2025)
- Number of employees: 18,505 (2026)
- Parent: Nexstar Media Group
- Subsidiaries: King Broadcasting Company; True Crime Network
- Website: tegna.com

Tegna Inc. (stylized in all caps as TEGNA) is an American broadcast, digital media and marketing services company headquartered in Tysons, Virginia, and a wholly owned subsidiary of Nexstar Media Group. It was created on June 29, 2015, when the Gannett Company split into two publicly traded companies. Tegna comprised the more profitable broadcast television and digital media divisions of the old Gannett, while Gannett's publishing interests were spun off as a "new" company which retained the Gannett name (later renamed USA Today Co.). Tegna operates 64 local television stations in 51 U.S. markets, as well as digital media properties.

In terms of audience reach, Tegna was the largest group owner of NBC-affiliated stations, ahead of Hearst Television and Sinclair Broadcast Group. Tegna was the fourth-largest group owner of ABC affiliates, behind Hearst, the E. W. Scripps Company, and Sinclair. Tegna also owned two digital multicast networks (True Crime Network and Quest).

On March 19, 2026, the DOJ and FCC approved Tegna's merger with Nexstar Media Group for $6.2 billion, with the merger closing 15 minutes later. The approval came one day after two antitrust lawsuits against the merger were filed, one from California alongside seven other states, and the other from DirecTV. A temporary restraining order was granted to halt the integration of Tegna's operations into Nexstar, which was escalated to a preliminary injunction, pending further resolution of the legal dispute.

== History ==
In June 2015, Gannett spun off its broadcasting division. Robert Dickey–who led Gannett's newspaper group–continued to be the CEO of the company as a sole newspaper publisher, leaving the former broadcasting and digital operations under the leadership of Gracia Martore. In a statement, Martore explained that the split plans were "significant next steps in our ongoing initiatives to increase shareholder value by building scale, increasing cash flow, sharpening management focus, and strengthening all of our businesses to compete effectively in today's increasingly digital landscape". Additionally, the company announced that it would buy out the remainder of Classified Ventures (a joint venture between Tegna and several other media companies) for $1.8 billion, giving it full ownership of properties including Cars.com.

As part of the separation, the company announced that the broadcasting and digital company would be named Tegna—a partial anagram of "Gannett". The spin-out was structured so that "old" Gannett changed its name to Tegna, Inc., then spun off its newspaper holdings into a "new" company, Gannett. The split was completed on June 29, 2015. Tegna retained "old" Gannett's stock price history, although it trades under a new ticker symbol, TGNA. The "new" Gannett inherited old Gannett's longtime ticker symbol, GCI. The two companies, however, continued to share a headquarters complex.

Tegna also retained G/O Digital, a digital marketing services brand which it launched in August 2013, and the 20 broadcast stations it acquired from Belo Corporation in December 2013 and the six stations it acquired from London Broadcasting Company in July 2014. In September 2016, Tegna announced plans to spin off Cars.com to create two independent publicly traded companies. Tegna shareholders approved an initial public offering of Cars.com as a publicly traded spin-off in May 2017. Shortly after, Tegna completed the spin-off of Cars.com, which trades under a new ticker symbol, CARS. After the completion of the spin-off, Dave Lougee, president of Tegna Media, was named president and CEO of Tegna and joined the company's board of directors. Gracia Martore, president and CEO of Tegna, retired and stepped down from the board.

Prior to the company's completion of the spin-off of Cars.com, it was reported by DealReporter that Nexstar Media Group may be considering a bid to acquire Tegna. In June 2017, Tegna announced it had entered into a definitive agreement, together with the other owners of CareerBuilder, to sell CareerBuilder to an investor group led by investments funds managed by affiliates of Apollo Global Management and the board of the Ontario Teachers’ Pension Plan.

Tegna and Cooper Media, parent corporation of the Justice Network, announced on November 7, 2017, a new multicast network, Quest. Tegna, the charter station group, would receive a minority stake in the network, which launched in January 2018. The range of programming on the network would be engineering and science, human achievements, military history, and natural history. On December 18, 2017, Tegna announced it would acquire KFMB-AM-FM-TV in San Diego, California from Midwest Television, Inc. for $325 million, pending approval from the Federal Communications Commission. The acquisition was completed on February 15, 2018. On August 20, 2018, Tegna agreed to purchase two stations spun off from the Gray Television-Raycom Media merger, CBS affiliate WTOL-TV in Toledo, Ohio (the sale likely includes rights to an existing shared services agreement with American Spirit Media-owned Fox affiliate WUPW) and NBC affiliate KWES-TV in Odessa, Texas in order to alleviate ownership conflicts involving Gray's ownership of ABC affiliate WTVG in the Toledo market and CBS affiliate KOSA-TV in the Odessa market.

In March 2019, Tegna announced its formation of VAULT Studios, its first, in-house digital content studio. The studio's first content would be true crime podcasts, drawing on its station news content. On March 20, 2019, Tegna entered an agreement with Nexstar Media Group to acquire eleven stations for $740 million in order to reduce Nexstar's national ownership reach under the federally imposed 39% cap and alleviate ownership conflicts with existing Nexstar properties once it completes a merger with Tribune Media. Included are stations WOI-DT–KCWI-DT in Des Moines, Iowa and WQAD-TV, based in Moline, Illinois but also serving neighboring Davenport, Iowa and Pennsylvania (WPMT/Harrisburg and WNEP-TV/Scranton–Wilkes-Barre). Other Nexstar/Tribune stations that went to Tegna are WZDX/Huntsville, KFSM-TV/Fort Smith–Fayetteville, WTIC-TV–WCCT-TV/Hartford, and WATN-TV–WLMT/Memphis. The FCC approved the sale on September 16.

On May 6, 2019, it was reported that Tegna would acquire the 85% of the Justice Network and Quest from Cooper Media that it did not own already for $77 million to close by the end of the second quarter. Cooper Media's president and general manager Brian Weiss transferred to Tegna and continued managing the two networks. On June 11, 2019, it was reported Tegna Inc. purchased the Dispatch Broadcast Group's television and radio assets, subject to regulatory approval, for $535 million. The purchase includes the WBNS television (CBS affiliate WBNS-TV) and radio (WBNS (AM) and WBNS-FM) stations in Columbus, the Ohio News Network, and NBC affiliate WTHR television in Indianapolis, Indiana. The sale was approved by the FCC on July 29, 2019, and was completed on August 8. In December 2019, Tegna agreed to sell KFMB-AM-FM to Local Media San Diego for $5 million; the sale was completed on March 17, 2020.

A carriage dispute with DirecTV, beginning at 7 p.m. ET on December 1, 2020, resulted in the removal of at least 60 Tegna stations in 51 markets, covering about 39% of TV homes, from the DirecTV, AT&T U-verse and AT&T TV services. The dispute was resolved on December 20, 2020.

A carriage dispute with Dish Network, beginning on October 6, 2021, resulted in the removal of at least 64 Tegna stations in 53 markets, covering about nearly 3 million customers. On October 18, Dish Network filed a complaint with the Federal Communications Commission against Tegna. However, on February 4, 2022, Dish Network reached an agreement with Tegna, resulting in all Tegna owned stations returning. Another carriage dispute with DirecTV in late 2023 resulted in the removal of 66 Tegna stations from the DirecTV, AT&T U-verse, AT&T TV and DirecTV Stream services at 8 p.m. ET on November 30. The dispute was resolved on January 13, 2024. In February 2024, TEGNA affirmed the dispute with DirecTV caused it to have less subscribers and overall revenue during 2023. On February 3, 2025, it was reported by multiple outlets that TEGNA eliminated its “Verify” fact-checking team, as well as the jobs of roughly 20 journalists.

=== Aborted sale to Standard General and Apollo Global Management ===
In 2020, activist shareholder Soo Kim, owner of Standard General, began to pursue control over Tegna, citing its "pattern of passivity" on the market. In March 2020, Tegna said that it had turned down two acquisition offers by Gray Television and Apollo Global Management, saying that "these two parties made their proposals shortly before the recent market dislocation due to the COVID-19 pandemic and both subsequently informed Tegna that they were ceasing discussions". In regards to other rumored offers from Byron Allen and religious broadcaster TBN (the latter in partnership with Jahm Najafi), the company stated that "the other two parties have not signed confidentiality agreements to enable due diligence and have not delivered any information on financing sources".

Kim began to engage in a proxy fight, with Standard General proposing four nominations to Tegna's board of directors at its next shareholders' meeting in April. Tegna's shareholders chose to re-elect all 12 current board members. Kim accepted the result of the vote, stating that the actions had helped to "[challenge] management's narrative about the Company's performance and seeking greater transparency about Tegna's numbers, acquisition metrics, and engagement with third parties". In 2021, Standard General once again put forward nominees to Tegna's board of directors, alleging that the company was underperforming and had issues with diversity, equity, and inclusion; the latter came after a Black nominee put forward by Standard General withdrew, citing a previous incident involving CEO Dave Lougee in 2014. The company stated that Lougee "immediately acknowledged the incident and has stated that he made a mistake, for which he had apologized immediately at the time".

On February 22, 2022, Tegna announced that it had agreed to be taken private by a group led by Standard General and Apollo Global Management for $24 per-share, valuing the company at $5.4 billion. The company would retain the Tegna name and be controlled by an affiliate of Standard General, with Standard Media CEO Deb McDermott (who previously led Young Broadcasting and Media General) becoming CEO. Affiliates of AGM, as well as Cox Media Group (which is principally owned by AGM, with Cox Enterprises as a minority shareholder) and other investors, would have held non-voting shares in the company. Tegna's digital advertising subsidiary Premion would be held as a standalone business between Standard and CMG. The sale included a clause that would slowly increase the per-share price if the sale takes longer than nine months to close.

As part of the sale, Standard planned to divest WDKA, WLNE, KBSI, and KLKN to Cox Media Group. Cox would have then sold its Boston station WFXT to an affiliate of Standard General, and acquire WFAA/KMPX, KHOU/KTBU, and KVUE from Tegna. The sale was approved by Standard General and Apollo Global Management on May 17, 2022. On October 6, 2022, Chair of the House Energy and Commerce Committee Frank Pallone and Speaker of the House Nancy Pelosi issued a letter to the FCC expressing concerns for the transaction, arguing that it "would violate the FCC's mandate by restricting access to local news coverage, cutting jobs at local television stations, and raising prices on consumers". They specifically cited statements by Standard General regarding plans for a Washington, D.C. bureau to produce content for local newscasts, and arguing that Tegna's stations had "too many employees". Standard General responded to the letter, denying that they planned to cut jobs or hub content, and promoting that Tegna would become the largest female-run and minority-owned broadcaster in the United States. They also responded to objections by NewsGuild-CWA describing Standard General as "backed by anonymous investors located in the Cayman Islands", stating that the entirety of its board is represented by U.S. interests.

On February 24, 2023, it was confirmed that FCC staff had referred the deal to an administrative law judge, effectively killing the deal since the hearing process would necessarily run longer than the merger agreement's deadline to close the deal. The deal was terminated on May 22, 2023.

=== Sale to Nexstar ===
On August 19, 2025, Tegna announced that it had agreed to be acquired by Nexstar Media Group, in an agreement that would expand its reach to 80% of television households. Nexstar would purchase the company for $22 per-share, valuing it at $6.2 billion. The completion of the deal would be contingent on shareholder and regulatory approval, including a proposed loosening of ownership caps for broadcast television stations by the second Trump administration; the FCC had recently launched a public comment period on changes to the caps, which Nexstar CEO Perry Sook has long opposed. In the markets where this would create a duopoly, Sook stated that Nexstar did not plan to consolidate local station operations such as news departments, comparing it to cities that have multiple newspapers "operating off the same printing press".

On November 18, 2025, the sale was approved by Tegna's shareholders. On February 7, 2026, after having initially made statements in opposition, President Donald Trump made a statement expressing support for the acquisition. He argued that it would enable more competition against what he denounced as "fake news national TV networks". Conservative media company Newsmax issued a statement in opposition of the deal, saying it would result in "dangerous consolidation that will limit competition, harm conservative voices and dramatically increase consumer cable bills."

On March 18, 2026, the state of California alongside seven other states filed an antitrust lawsuit to block the merger, with the Attorney General Rob Bonta arguing that it would cause "irreparable harm to local news and consumers who rely on their reporting as a critical source of information." The next day, DirecTV also filed an antitrust suit within the same district court as the former. Later that day, the sale was approved by the Justice Department and the FCC, and the transaction closed immediately afterwards.

On March 27, 2026, District Judge Troy Nunley granted a request for a 14-day temporary restraining order to suspend any further integration of Tegna into Nexstar, writing that it was "presumed likely to violate antitrust laws based on the combined firm market share alone." On March 31, Nunley consolidated the California and DirecTV lawsuits into a single case. The same day, Nexstar made a court filing requesting clarifications and changes to the TRO, arguing that it "cannot implement certain provisions of the TRO as written because of actions already completed at closing and legal obligations that cannot be reversed."

The court issued a preliminary injunction on April 17, 2026, requiring Nexstar and Tegna to maintain their operations as separate and independent entities while the antitrust litigation proceeded. The court found that the plaintiffs were likely to succeed in establishing that the acquisition would substantially lessen competition in numerous television markets. The injunction prohibited Nexstar from integrating Tegna’s operations and restricted the sharing of competitively sensitive information between the companies.

On July 8, 2026, Nexstar appealed the preliminary injunction to the U.S. Court of Appeals for the Ninth Circuit, seeking to narrow the order and dismiss the states’ antitrust claims. The district court set a trial date of July 6, 2027.

Tegna appointed Patrick Paolini as chief executive officer on May 26, 2026, effective June 1. Paolini, a veteran Fox Television Stations executive, became responsible for Tegna’s daily operations, revenue-generating strategies, local journalism and production, and growth initiatives.

Paolini appointed Kurt Rao as Tegna’s executive vice president and chief technology and digital products officer in June 2026. Rao was given responsibility for Tegna’s digital products and technology platforms, including product management, technology, engineering and operations across its broadcast, streaming, mobile and digital platforms.

On July 8, 2026, the U.S. Court of Appeals for the D.C. Circuit dismissed challenges to the Federal Communications Commission’s approval of the acquisition, ruling that the appeals were premature because the FCC had not yet acted on applications seeking review of the Media Bureau’s approval. The court also denied petitions seeking to compel the FCC to act and denied requests for a stay.

A federal judge ruled in August 2026 that Nexstar’s appointment of current and former Nexstar executives to Tegna’s board violated the preliminary injunction requiring the companies to remain separate. The court ordered Nexstar to take steps to comply with the injunction, including removing the affected directors, and required regular reporting on Tegna’s board and operations.

On August 25, 2026, Nexstar appointed a new Tegna board consisting of three directors and one non-voting member, replacing the directors that had been found to violate the preliminary injunction.

== Current properties ==
=== Broadcast stations ===
Tegna owns or operates 68 television stations located in 54 markets, including fourteen duopolies; it also owns two radio stations.

Media market	State/Dist.	Station	Purchased	Primary affiliation	Note(s)	Ref(s)
Huntsville	Alabama	WZDX	2019	Fox		
Flagstaff	Arizona	KNAZ-TV	1997	NBC	(Note: Satellite of KPNX.)	
Phoenix	Arizona	KPNX	1979	NBC		
Tucson	Arizona	KMSB	2015 (Note: Owned by Sander Media from 2013 to 2015 and operated by Gannett/Tegna prior to its acquisition by Tegna Inc. in 2015.)	Fox	(Note: Operated by Gray Media.)	
Tucson	Arizona	KTTU	2013	The CW		
Fort Smith–Fayetteville	Arkansas	KFSM-TV	2019	CBS		
Little Rock	Arkansas	KTHV	1994	CBS		
Sacramento	California	KXTV	1999	ABC		
San Diego	California	KFMB-TV	2018	CBS		
Denver	Colorado	KUSA	1979	NBC		
Denver	Colorado	KTVD	2006	MyNetworkTV		
Hartford–New Haven	Connecticut	WTIC-TV	2019	Fox		
Hartford–New Haven	Connecticut	WCCT-TV	2019	The CW		
Washington, D.C.	District of Columbia	WUSA	1986	CBS		
Jacksonville	Florida	WJXX	2000	ABC		
Jacksonville	Florida	WTLV	1987	NBC		
Tampa–St. Petersburg	Florida	WTSP	1996	CBS	(Note: Station assigned to licensee Pacific and Southern Company, Inc.)	
Atlanta	Georgia	WXIA-TV	1979	NBC		
Atlanta	Georgia	WATL	2006	MyNetworkTV		
Macon	Georgia	WMAZ-TV	1995	CBS		
Boise	Idaho	KTVB	2013	NBC	(Note: Station assigned to licensee King Broadcasting Company.)	
Twin Falls	Idaho	KTFT-LD	2013	NBC	(Note: Satellite of KTVB.)	
Indianapolis	Indiana	WALV-CD	2019	MeTV		
Indianapolis	Indiana	WTHR	2019	NBC		
Davenport (Quad Cities)	Iowa	WQAD-TV	2019	ABC		
Des Moines	Iowa	KCWI-TV	2019	The CW		
Des Moines	Iowa	WOI-DT	2019	ABC		
Louisville	Kentucky	WHAS-TV	2015	ABC		
New Orleans	Louisiana	WWL-TV	2013	CBS		
New Orleans	Louisiana	WUPL	2013	MyNetworkTV		
Portland	Maine	WCSH	1998	NBC		
Bangor	Maine	WLBZ	1998	NBC	(Note: Semi-satellite of WCSH.)	
Grand Rapids	Michigan	WZZM	1997	ABC		
Minneapolis–Saint Paul	Minnesota	KARE	1983	NBC		
St. Louis	Missouri	KSDK	1995	NBC		
Buffalo	New York	WGRZ	1997	NBC		
Charlotte	North Carolina	WCNC-TV	2013	NBC		
Greensboro	North Carolina	WFMY-TV	1987	CBS		
Cleveland	Ohio	WKYC	1995	NBC		
Columbus	Ohio	WBNS	2019	—N/a		
Columbus	Ohio	WBNS-FM	2019	—N/a		
Columbus	Ohio	WBNS-TV	2019	CBS		
Toledo	Ohio	WTOL	2019	CBS		
Toledo	Ohio	WUPW	2019	Fox	(Note: Owned by American Spirit Media.)	
Portland	Oregon	KGW	2015	NBC		
Scranton–Wilkes-Barre	Pennsylvania	WNEP-TV	2019	ABC		
Harrisburg	Pennsylvania	WPMT	2019	Fox		
Columbia	South Carolina	WLTX	1998	CBS		
Knoxville	Tennessee	WBIR-TV	1995	NBC		
Memphis	Tennessee	WATN-TV	2019	ABC		
Memphis	Tennessee	WLMT	2019	The CW with MyNetworkTV		
Abilene	Texas	KXVA	2014	Fox		
Austin	Texas	KVUE	2013	ABC	(Note: KVUE was previously owned by Gannett from 1986 to 1999, when it was traded to Belo in exchange for KXTV.)	
Beaumont	Texas	KBMT	2014	ABC		
Bryan–College Station	Texas	KAGS-LD	2014	NBC	(Note: Semi-satellite of KCEN.)	
Corpus Christi	Texas	KIII	2014	ABC		
Dallas–Fort Worth	Texas	WFAA	2013	ABC		
Dallas–Fort Worth	Texas	KFAA-TV	2020	Independent		
Houston	Texas	KHOU	2013	CBS		
Houston	Texas	KTBU	2020	Quest		
Odessa–Midland	Texas	KWES-TV	2019	NBC		
San Angelo	Texas	KIDY	2014	Fox		
San Antonio	Texas	KENS	2013	CBS		
Tyler	Texas	KYTX	2014	CBS		
Waco	Texas	KCEN-TV	2014	NBC		
Norfolk	Virginia	WVEC	2013	ABC		
Seattle–Tacoma	Washington	KING-TV	2013	NBC		
Seattle–Tacoma	Washington	KONG	2013	Independent		
Spokane	Washington	KREM	2013	CBS		
Spokane	Washington	KSKN	2013	The CW		

=== Networks ===
- Idaho's Very Own 24/7 (KTVB 7.2)
- NewsWatch 15 (Note: Jointly owned by Tegna (50%) and Cox Communications (50%); received in the purchase of Belo)
- True Crime Network
- Quest

=== Television shows ===
In 2015, Tegna Media test-ran a limited-run informative talk show hosted by Dallas-based bishop T. D. Jakes on its owned stations in Dallas, Atlanta, Minneapolis and Cleveland. The show, titled T.D. Jakes, was co-produced by Debmar-Mercury, Tegna Media, 44 Blue Productions, Jakes' own production company (TDJ Enterprises), and EnLight Productions. It ran from August 17, 2016, to September 8, 2017. On December 9, Tegna greenlit the series for an entire run for the 2016–2017 broadcast season. Debmar-Mercury, however, is not participating in the production run, being replaced by independent company Flow Media Partners.

T.D. Jakes ended in September 2017 and was replaced with news and entertainment show Daily Blast Live, which premiered on September 11, 2017. Other shows Tegna Media has on first-run syndication across most of its stations are Sister Circle (also shown on cable network TV One), and reality competition Sing Like A Star.

In January 2018, Tegna announced a partnership with Sony Pictures Television to handle syndication distribution and advertising sales for its original programs.

=== Digital sites ===
Gannett Company spun-off most of its internet media properties to Tegna. When the entire internet media division was part of the Gannett Company, it managed the websites for USA Today, as well as Gannett's newspaper and broadcast properties throughout the United States. It owns:

- G/O Digital
- Premion
- Locked On Podcast Network

== Former assets ==
Stations are arranged in alphabetical order by state and city of license. The list includes stations owned by Tegna, Inc. during its former existence as the Gannett Company subsidiary Gannett Broadcasting, Inc.

- (**) – Indicates a station that was built and/or signed-on by Gannett.

Stations formerly owned by Gannett Broadcasting
Media market	State/Dist.	Station	Purchased	Sold	Notes
Mobile	Alabama	WALA-TV	1986	1986	(Note: Acquired with Gannett's purchase of The Detroit News, but subsequently spun off to Knight-Ridder a month later in order for Gannett to comply with the FCC's then-current limits on group ownership.)
Kingman	Arizona	KMOH-TV	1997	2004	
Phoenix	Arizona	KTVK	2013	2014	
Phoenix	Arizona	KASW	2013	2014	
Tucson	Arizona	KOLD-TV	1986	1986	
Little Rock	Arkansas	KARK-TV	1979	1983	
Los Angeles	California	KIIS	1979	1997	(Note: Known as KPRZ from 1980 to 1984.)
Los Angeles	California	KIIS-FM	1979	1997	
Sacramento	California	KOVR	1958	1959	
San Diego	California	KSDO	1979	1997	
San Diego	California	KFMB	2018	2020	
San Diego	California	KFMB-FM	2018	2020	
San Diego	California	KSDO-FM	1979	1997	(Note: Known as KEZL prior to 1984, KSWV from 1987 to 1989, KCLX from 1992 to 1995 and KKBH from 1995 to 1997.)
Hartford–New Haven	Connecticut	WTHT**	1936	1954	
Melbourne	Florida	WEZY	1966	1970	
Melbourne	Florida	WEZY-FM	1966	1970	
Tampa–St. Petersburg	Florida	WDAE	1987	1997	
Tampa–St. Petersburg	Florida	WUSA-FM	1980	1997	(Note: Known as WJYW prior to 1982 and WIQI from 1982 to 1986.)
Macon, GA	Georgia	WMAZ	1995	1996	
Macon, GA	Georgia	WAYS	1995	1996	
Chicago, IL	Illinois	WGCI	1979	1997	(Note: Known as WVON prior to 1983.)
Chicago, IL	Illinois	WGCI-FM	1979	1997	
Danville–Champaign	Illinois	WDAN	1948	1971	
Danville–Champaign	Illinois	WDAN-FM**	1967	1971	
Danville–Champaign	Illinois	WDAN-TV**	1953	1960	
Rockford	Illinois	WREX-TV	1963	1969	
Fort Wayne	Indiana	WPTA	1979	1983	
Louisville	Kentucky	WLKY-TV	1979	1983	
Boston	Massachusetts	WLVI	1983	1994	
Detroit	Michigan	WLQV	1979	1986	
Detroit	Michigan	WCZY-FM	1979	1986	
Kansas City	Missouri	KCMO	1986	1993	
Kansas City	Missouri	KCMO-FM	1986	1993	
St. Louis	Missouri	KMOV	2013	2014	
St. Louis	Missouri	KSD-FM	1979	1993	(Note: Known as KCFM prior to 1980.)
St. Louis	Missouri	KUSA	1979	1993	(Note: Known as KSD prior to 1983.)
Albany	New York	WABY	1934	1982	
Binghamton	New York	WINR	1957	1971	
Binghamton	New York	WINR-TV**	1957	1971	
Elmira	New York	WENY**	1939	1969	
Elmira	New York	WENY-FM**	1965	1969	
Olean	New York	WHDL	1934	1957	(Note: Gannett had a minority interest in this station.)
Olean	New York	WHDL-FM**	1949	1957	
Rochester	New York	WHEC	1936	1972	
Rochester	New York	WHEC-TV**	1953	1979	
Cincinnati	Ohio	WLWT	1995	1997	
Cleveland	Ohio	WDOK	1979	1985	
Cleveland	Ohio	WWWE	1979	1985	
Marietta	Ohio	WBRJ	1974	1979	
Wilmington	Ohio	WKFI	1974	1979	
Oklahoma City	Oklahoma	KOCO-TV	1979	1997	
Oklahoma City	Oklahoma	KTVY	1986	1986	
Dallas–Fort Worth	Texas	KHKS	1986	1997	(Note: Known as KTKS prior to 1987 and KOAI from 1987 to 1992.)
Houston	Texas	KKBQ	1984	1997	
Houston	Texas	KKBQ-FM	1984	1997	
Seattle	Washington	KNUA	1986	1990	

=== Cable networks ===
- TXCN
- Northwest Cable News

=== Broadcast networks ===
- Twist

=== Digital sites ===
- Cars.com – Tegna completed the spin-off of Cars.com on June 1, 2017.
- Cofactor Digital (ShopLocal) – On December 15, 2016, it sold Cofactor to Liquidus, a digital marketing solutions company.
- CareerBuilder – sold to Apollo Global Management
