= WbN =

Wbn may refer to:

- Wiesbaden, the capital of Hesse, Germany

WbN may refer to:

- West by North, as a compass point in Boxing the compass (WbN)
- Werewolf by Night, a Marvel Comics character
  - Werewolf by Night (TV special), a television special produced by Marvel Studios based on the comics character

wBN may refer to:

- Wurtzite Boron nitride (w-BN)

WBN may refer to: WBN may refer to:

- The WB Television Network

== See also ==
- WBNS (disambiguation)
