= WELD (Ohio) =

Radio station in Columbus, Ohio (1941–1953)

WELD was an FM radio station in Columbus, Ohio, that began broadcasting, as W45CM, in 1941. It was the first commercial FM station authorized in the state of Ohio. WELD suspended operations and was deleted in 1953.

== History ==
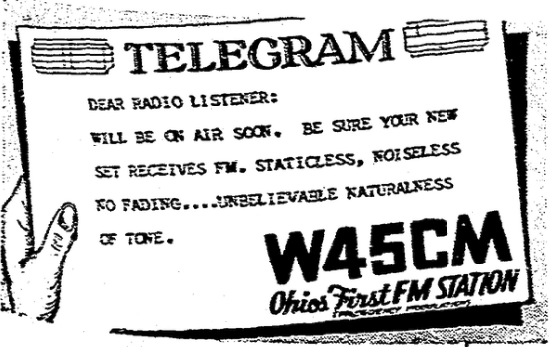
W45CM debuted on November 9, 1941 as Ohio's first FM station.

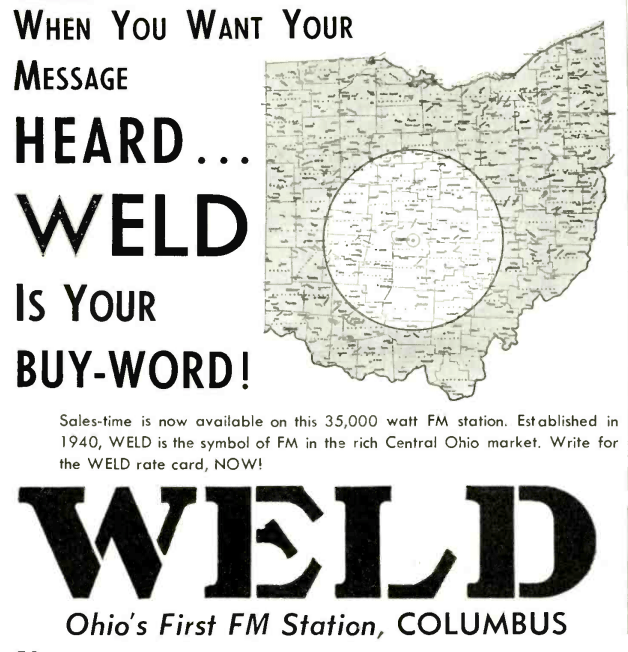
1947 promotional advertisement for the station, now WELD.

In May 1940, the Federal Communications Commission (FCC) announced the establishment, effective January 1, 1941, of an FM radio band operating on 40 channels spanning 42–50 MHz. On October 31, 1940, the first fifteen construction permits for commercial FM stations were issued, including one to WBNS, Inc. for a station in Columbus at 44.5 MHz, which was issued the call sign W45CM. The company had previously operated an experimental FM station, W8XVH.

W45CM made its formal debut broadcast on November 9, 1941. The station was co-owned with AM station WBNS. During World War Two, manufacturing restrictions limited the production of FM receivers, and WBNS began broadcasting "a regular program devoted to explaining the advantages of FM broadcasting". Effective November 1, 1943, the FCC modified its policy for FM call letters, and the station was assigned new call letters of WELD.

On June 27, 1945 the FCC announced the reassignment of the FM band to 80 channels from 88–106 MHz, which was soon expanded to 100 channels from 88–108 MHz. WELD was originally assigned to 92.9 MHz on the new band, which was later changed to 97.1 MHz. The FCC provided that, during a transitional period, stations could simultaneously broadcast on both their old and new frequencies.

WELD, now owned by RadiOhio, Inc., suspended operations in July 1953, and was formally deleted on July 14, 1953. In 1957, RadiOhio received a license for a new Columbus FM station, also on 97.1 MHz, which was assigned the call letters WBNS-FM.
