= Ron Olsen =

American journalist

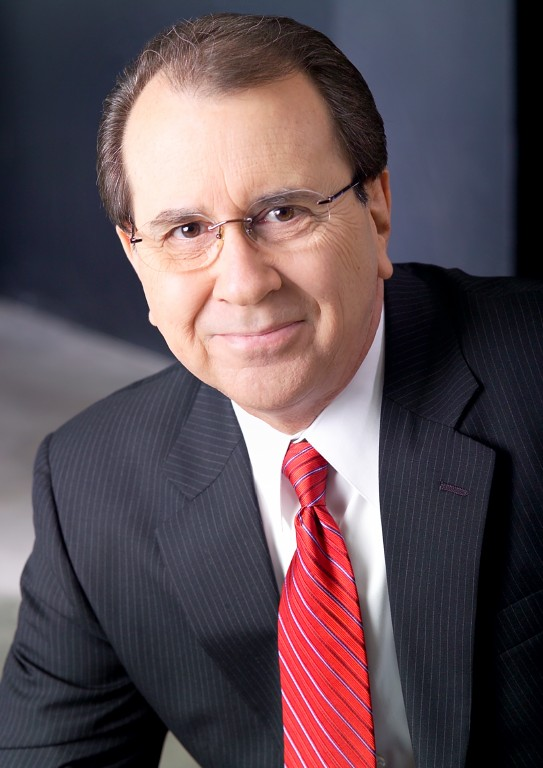
- Born: Minneapolis, Minnesota, U.S.
- Education: Communications/Theater Arts, Univ. of Minnesota, Twin Cities - Bemidji State University, Bemidji, MN
- Occupation: Journalist
- Notable credit(s): Emmy Awards, Peabody Award, Edward R. Murrow Award, "Workingreporter.com" (Founder & Publisher), "Prime News" and "News at Ten" (KTLA-TV), "Eyewitness News" (KABC-TV), ABC Radio Network News, Cross-Platform Journalism (Los Angeles Times & KTLA-TV), Editorial Writer (Valley News Group Newspapers)
- Website: Official website

Ron Olsen is an American journalist based in Harford County, Maryland.

== Early life ==
Olsen attended the University of Minnesota and Bemidji State University. He has studied vocal interpretation with Lilyan Wilder and Pat Fraley.

== Professional life ==
Olsen began broadcasting at student-run WMMR Radio (now "Radio K") at the University of Minnesota. Prior to career in television and radio news, he worked in TV production at KSTP, which broadcast to the Minneapolis–Saint Paul metropolitan area. He later worked in broadcast journalism at KELO-TV in Sioux Falls, South Dakota; WBNS-TV in Columbus, Ohio; KDKA-TV and radio in Pittsburgh, Pennsylvania; WMAR-TV in Baltimore, Maryland, and KABC-TV, KHJ-TV (now KCAL-TV), KTLA-TV, and ABC Radio Networks in Los Angeles. At KDKA-TV in Pittsburgh, Olsen hosted the "Channel to Pittsburgh" talk show and the Group W public affairs show "Impact”. At KTLA-TV in Los Angeles, he co-hosted the "Weekend Gallery" talk show.

Olsen joined the staff of KTLA-TV in 1987. While there, he worked as a reporter, news anchor and, talk show host. From May 2002 to 2009, he worked at the Los Angeles Times, adapting stories which appeared in the daily newspaper into television segments, which aired on KTLA-TV. In 2009, Olsen left KTLA-TV.

He is a member of SAG-AFTRA, the Society of Professional Journalists, and the Los Angeles Press Club. He served on the broadcast committee of AFTRA's Los Angeles Local prior to the SAG-AFTRA merger.

=== O. J. Simpson ===
Ron Olsen was among the first journalists to arrive at the Bundy murder scene and was KTLA-TV’s principal field reporter for coverage of the O. J. Simpson criminal and civil trials, which went on for nearly three years. He followed Simpson in a news van during the famous "low-speed chase."

=== Rodney King ===
Olsen covered the Los Angeles riots in 1992. He was at the LA police headquarters at Parker Center when the rioting started and later covered the federal trials of the four officers who were charged for beating Rodney King.

=== Charity work ===
Ron Olsen has volunteered for several charities, including the Hugh O'Brian Youth Leadership Foundation and the World Children's Transplant Fund.

== Personal life ==
Olsen is a member of the Theta Tau Epsilon fraternity. After spending more than 30 years in Southern California, Olsen now lives in Maryland.

== Awards and accomplishments ==
Olsen is the recipient of multiple Emmy Awards for his coverage of a 1993 Malibu fire and the 1994 Northridge earthquake, best newscast over 35 minutes in length (Prime News-KTLA-TV) in 2006 and a Peabody Award for KTLA-TV’s coverage of the Rodney King beating in 1991. In 2001, he was awarded first place for television difficult news coverage from the Greater Los Angeles Press Club. Other honors include three "Golden Mike" awards from the Radio and Television News Association of Southern California, the 2001 award for spot news coverage from the APTRA of California and Nevada, a Regional Edward R. Murrow Award for spot news coverage from the RTNDA in 1998, and two Golden Quill awards from the Pittsburgh Press Club.
