= Heather Pick =

American journalist

Heather Pick (September 12, 1970 – November 7, 2008) was an American television news anchor as well as an activist on behalf of breast cancer awareness and juvenile diabetes. She began her career in newscasting at WREX-TV in Rockford, Illinois before moving in 2002 to Columbus, Ohio where she was the morning and noon news anchor for WBNS-TV.

== Early life ==
Born in 1970, Pick was raised in Platteville, Wisconsin as one of seven children in her family. Her father worked for a lumber company, her mother as a homemaker. She was a graduate of the University of Wisconsin–Platteville. She became a news anchor at WREX after an internship there, staying for almost 10 years in Rockford.

== Career ==
While at WREX, she met her husband Joe Cygan, a Chicago-area native and great-grandson of Chicago mayor DeWitt Clinton Cregier, who was also employed by the station.

After moving to Ohio, she worked closely with Jack Hanna of the Columbus Zoo and Aquarium, even appearing on an episode of Late Show with David Letterman as Hanna's assistant. The Columbus Zoo and Aquarium is dedicating a bench near the park entrance in her honor.

Pick worked alongside actress Mary Tyler Moore in support of the Juvenile Diabetes Research Foundation. In 2007, Pick recorded an album titled "Circle of Support". A collection of original and cover songs all sung by Pick, the CD was released by the organization A Christmas to Cure Cancer.

== Death ==
Heather died of breast cancer on November 7, 2008 at home in Columbus, Ohio. She continued working for WBNS during much of her illness and appeared on air for the last time in early October 2008.
