= WFKS =

Radio station in Melbourne, Florida

- Melbourne, Florida; United States
- Broadcast area: Melbourne–Titusville–; Cocoa, Florida
- Frequency: 95.1 MHz (HD Radio)
- RDS: KISS951
- Branding: Kiss 95.1

Programming
- Format: Contemporary hit radio
- Affiliations: Premiere Networks

Ownership
- Owner: iHeartMedia; (iHM Licenses, LLC)
- Sister stations: WLRQ-FM; WMMB; WMMV

History
- First air date: February 1, 1967; 59 years ago
- Former call signs: WMMB-FM (CP; 1963–1967); WYRL (1967–1987); WMMY-FM (1987–1990); WGGD-FM (1990–1997); WBVD (1997–2011)
- Call sign meaning: Florida's Kiss

Technical information
- Licensing authority: FCC
- Facility ID: 11409
- Class: A
- ERP: 4,300 watts
- HAAT: 118 meters (387 feet)
- Transmitter coordinates: 28°8′13.1″N 80°42′12.2″W

Links
- Public license information: Public file; LMS
- Webcast: Listen live (via iHeartRadio)
- Website: mykiss951.iheart.com

WFKS (95.1 FM) is a rhythmic-leaning contemporary hit radio station serving Florida's Space Coast area. The iHeartMedia outlet broadcasts with an ERP of 4.3 kW and is licensed to Melbourne, Florida.

== History ==
The station was branded as 95.1 The Beat until March 14, 2007 with a rhythmic contemporary format.

On July 22, 2011, the station changed its call letters to WFKS, after those calls were dropped by sister station WKSL in Jacksonville earlier in the month upon that station's rebranding as "Radio NOW" (Now KISS FM).
