= Jerry Revish =

Jerry Revish (born 1949) is a retired television news anchor for WBNS-TV in Columbus, Ohio. He started at the station as a reporter in June 1980.

Revish anchored the 5 PM, 6 PM, and 11 PM news with Yolanda Harris.

Revish is a native of Youngstown, Ohio, where he got his start in broadcasting at WBBW Radio. Revish and his wife, Danielle, a fashion show producer and image consultant, have two adult children, Nicole and Jerome, and three grandchildren, Samuel, Madison, and Sidney.

Revish announced on Thursday, August 22, 2019 that he would be retiring in November. His last air date on WBNS-10TV was on November 27, 2019. The Revishes, both ordained ministers, created their own church called Unity Temple Church of God in Christ in the South side of Columbus in May 2011. Retiring from WBNS, he will focus on his church, traveling with his wife, and spending more time with his children and grandchildren.
