= The Judge (TV series) =

American television series

- Genre: Dramatized court show
- Starring: Bob Shield (as Judge Robert J. Franklin)
- Opening theme: "Positive Approach" by Simon May and Ian Hughes
- Country of origin: United States
- No. of seasons: 7
- No. of episodes: 70

Production
- Production company: WBNS-TV

Original release
- Network: First-run syndication
- Release: September 15, 1986 – May 28, 1993

The Judge is an American dramatized court show which ran in first-run syndication from 1986 to 1993. The series chronicled family court cases heard by Judge Robert J. Franklin, played by Bob Shield.

In contrast to The People's Court, which featured actual litigants, The Judge, along with Divorce Court and Superior Court, was one of several popular shows of the day that featured dramatizations of actual court cases. The Judge was produced and licensed by WBNS-TV in Columbus, Ohio, and was distributed by Genesis Entertainment.

== Show format ==
Each episode normally began with a pre-hearing cold open, usually featuring with one or both of the parties discussing the upcoming trial either inside or just outside the courtroom. In some episodes, the cold open would feature one of the lawyers talking to Judge Franklin in his chambers.

The title sequence would begin at Judge Franklin's home with Franklin preparing for work. The photographs that the camera pans across are actually of Shield himself, showing his days in the Army and as a young man. After a kiss to his wife and a wave to their neighbors, Judge Franklin would drive off to work as we heard him narrate:

"I'm Judge Robert J. Franklin. I chose the law as my way of serving my fellow citizens. As an elected judge in the family court, I pray each day that God will give me the wisdom to always temper justice with mercy."

The building standing in for the courthouse is the Pasadena City Hall in Pasadena, California. The title sequence would then end with him entering his chambers, sitting down, and signing some documents, concluding with a close-up of his signature.

The episode proper would then begin with Franklin entering the courtroom while an off-screen narrator explains:

"What you are about to see is a dramatization of an actual case in family court. Because of the emotional and sensitive nature of the issues presented here, Judge Franklin's courtroom is closed to the public. The proceedings are about to begin."

Like the aforementioned courtroom dramas, episodes of The Judge involved shock value: cases that began as mundane or routine often ended up taking a serious or unexpected turn.

== Other regular characters ==
- Janet Page (J.T. Solomon), Judge Franklin's courtroom assistant.
- Sergeant Terrance Fox (Brendan Burns), a recurring character who was often used for comic relief. An honest police officer with an abrasive personality, Fox would often irritate Judge Franklin to no end; in one episode he told the officer that he would try the patience of a saint, adding, "And I am no saint!"

== Broadcast history ==
A drama that later became The Judge, called Municipal Court (changed to The Judge while still a local program), ran for twelve years as a local television program in Columbus, Ohio. Shield, playing Judge Franklin, won four regional Emmy Awards for his performance. In 1986, The Judge was picked up for national syndication, where it enjoyed a seven-year run.

Repeats of The Judge aired on the USA Network in the early 1990s.

The nationally syndicated version was originally taped in Los Angeles for its first four runs of ten episodes each (1986–89), and later moved to Toronto, Ontario, Canada for its final three runs (1990–93). The show was licensed by WBNS-TV in Columbus.
