= WBNS-FM =

Sports radio station in Columbus, Ohio

- Columbus, Ohio; United States
- Broadcast area: Columbus metropolitan area
- Frequency: 97.1 MHz (HD Radio)
- Branding: 97.1 The Fan

Programming
- Format: Sports radio
- Subchannels: HD2: Sports and sports gambling (WBNS); HD3: Sports radio
- Affiliations: Westwood One Sports; ONN Radio; WBNS-TV

Ownership
- Owner: Tegna Inc., a subsidiary of Nexstar Media Group; (RadiOhio, Incorporated)
- Sister stations: WBNS, WBNS-TV; Nexstar: WCMH-TV

History
- First air date: June 1959
- Call sign meaning: Derived from WBNS

Technical information
- Licensing authority: FCC
- Facility ID: 54701
- Class: B
- ERP: 20,500 watts
- HAAT: 238 meters (781 ft)
- Transmitter coordinates: 39°58′16.2″N 83°1′39.6″W

Links
- Public license information: Public file; LMS
- Webcast: Listen live (via TuneIn)
- Website: 971thefan.com

WBNS-FM (97.1 FM, "97.1 The Fan") is a commercial radio station licensed to Columbus, Ohio, United States, featuring a sports radio format. Owned by the Tegna Inc. subsidiary of Nexstar Media Group, WBNS-FM, WBNS and WBNS-TV share studios and offices on Twin Rivers Drive, west of Downtown Columbus. WBNS-FM is the flagship station of the Ohio State Sports Network.

WBNS-FM's transmitter is shared with WBNS-TV, the tallest free-standing structure in Columbus. It is adjacent to the studios on Twin Rivers Drive near Interstate 670. WBNS-FM also broadcasts in HD Radio.

== History ==
=== Previous stations ===
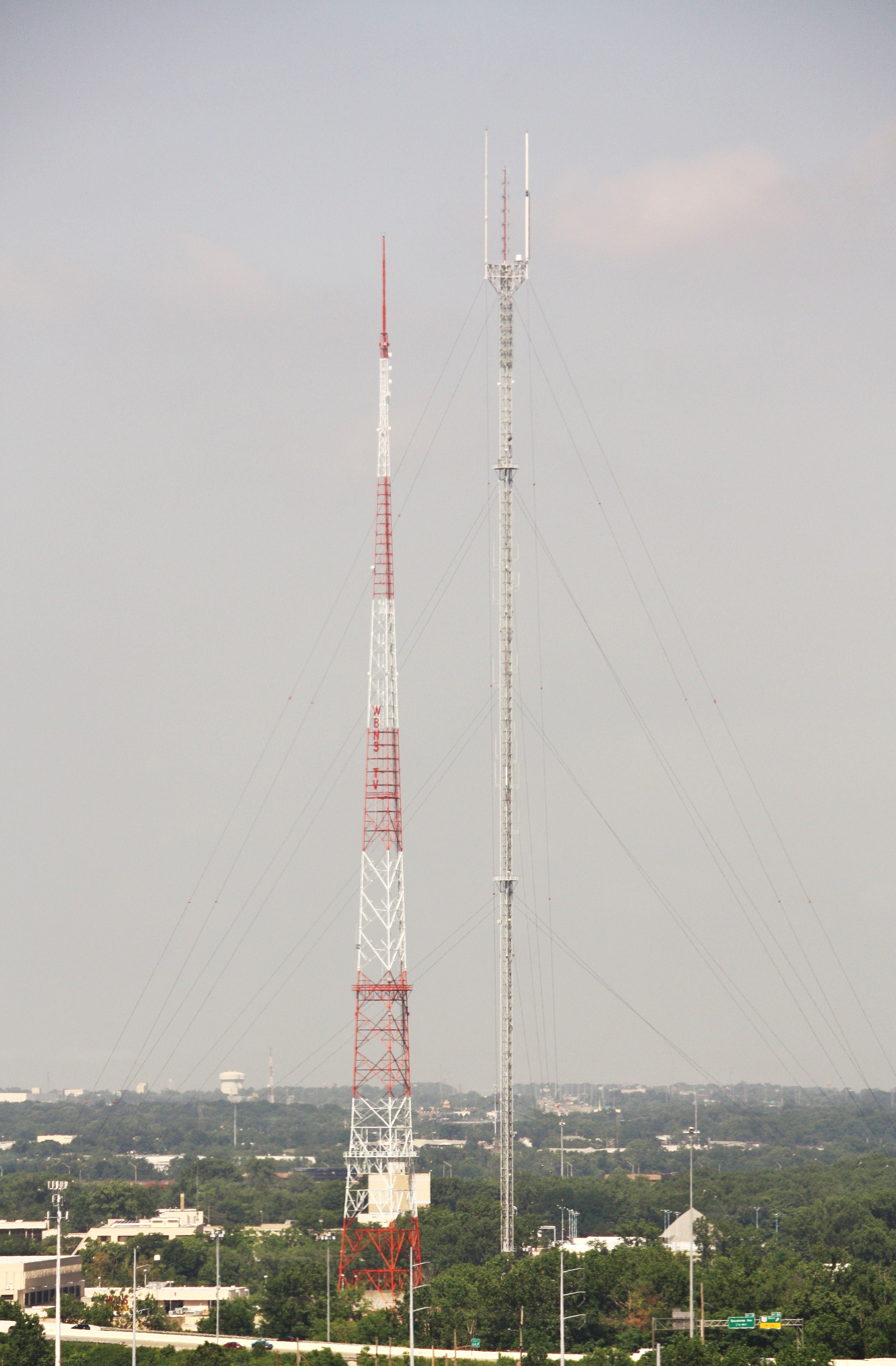
WBNS-FM transmission tower (right), next to the WBNS-TV tower.

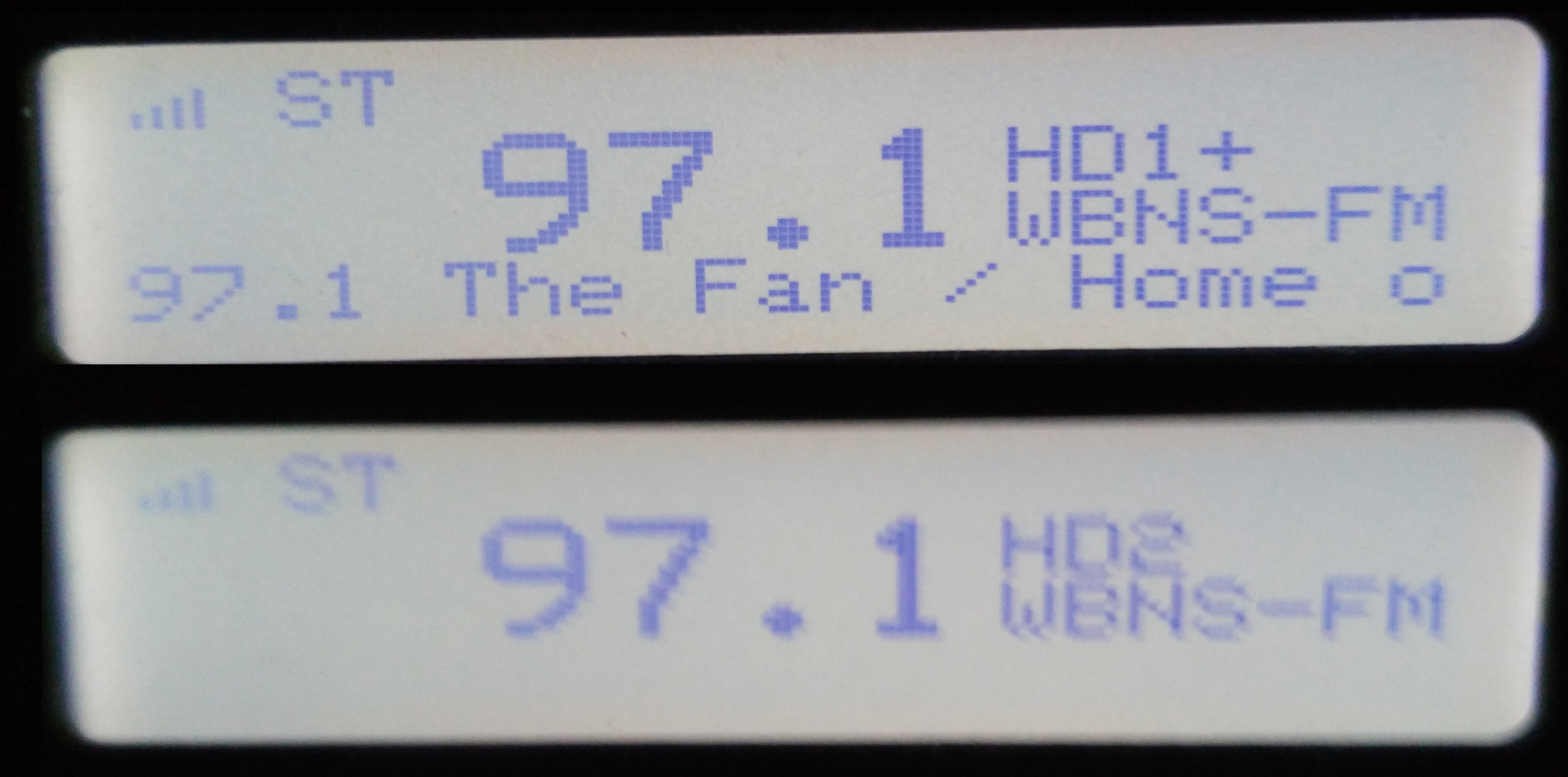
WBNS-FM's HD Radio Channels on a SPARC Radio with PSD.

WBNS's sister station, WBNS (AM 1460), was established in 1922. It is one of Ohio's oldest stations. In 1929, it was acquired by the Wolfe family, the owners of the market-leading newspaper, The Columbus Dispatch. WBNS began FM broadcasts as early as 1940 with experimental station W8XVH.

In 1941, it became commercial station W45CM, and later WELD (FM stations were disallowed from sharing their AM sister's calls at the time). Management suspended operations in July 1953 due to low listenership as few affordable FM receivers were available WELD was formally deleted on July 14, 1953.

=== Beautiful music ===
WBNS-FM signed on the air in June 1959. It used the same frequency, 97.1 MHz, previously used by co-owned WELD. At first it largely simulcast WBNS 1460 AM.

In 1970, it broke away from the simulcast. It began airing a beautiful music format, playing quarter-hour sweeps of instrumental cover versions of popular songs, Broadway and Hollywood show tunes. In the 1980s, the station began playing more soft adult contemporary vocals, in an effort to appeal to a younger audience.

=== Oldies and AC ===
In November 1991 the station moved from easy listening, to oldies, calling itself "Oldies B-97.1". The playlist was made up of Top 40 hits of the 1960s, along with a few songs from the late '50s and early '70s. Almost ten years later, in July 2001, WBNS-FM moved to modern AC as "The New 97.1", with a mix of pop alternative music.

Eventually, the station evolved with a hot AC format as "97.1-More Music, More Variety." In August 2005, the station began using the "Mix" name and became "Mix 97.1-80s, 90s, Now." Meanwhile, co-owned WBNS 1460 AM had good ratings as an all-sports AM station, as more cities were getting FM sports outlets. Management decided to capitalize on its sports franchise.

=== Sports format ===
On January 26, 2009, at 2 PM, WBNS-FM began a simulcast of AM sister station WBNS "1460 The Fan." WBNS-FM became "97.1 The Fan." The final song played on Mix 97.1 was "Leave Out All The Rest" by Linkin Park.

On June 11, 2019, The Columbus Dispatch announced it was selling its broadcasting assets, including WBNS-AM-FM-TV, to Tegna Inc., for $535 million in cash. The deal was expected to close in the third quarter of 2019, pending Federal Communications Commission approval. The sale was completed on August 8.

Over time, WBNS-FM became the exclusive home of local Columbus-based sports shows, while WBNS 1460 AM airs the national ESPN Radio Network feed. The AM station is also heard on one of WBNS-FM's HD Radio digital subchannels. In May 2024, the BetQL Network, carrying sports gambling shows, began airing on WBNS-FM-HD3.

Nexstar Media Group acquired Tegna in a deal announced in August 2025 and completed on March 16, 2026. A temporary restraining order issued one week later by the U.S. District Court for the Eastern District of California, later escalated to a preliminary injunction, has prevented WBNS AM/FM/TV from being integrated into WCMH.

== Programming ==
WBNS-FM airs local sports talk shows during weekdays and early evenings. It carries the syndicated Westwood One Sports late nights and weekends. Its sister station, WBNS 1460 AM, runs BetMGM Network and Westwood One Sports most hours.

WBNS-FM is the FM flagship for the Ohio State Sports Network, the Columbus Blue Jackets Radio Network, and the Columbus Crew, and the market affiliate for the Cleveland Browns Radio Network, Cincinnati Reds Radio Network, the NFL on Westwood One Sports and Indinity Sports Network, the latter in a shared affiliation with WBNS (AM).
