= WBVI =

Radio station in Fostoria, Ohio

- Fostoria, Ohio; United States
- Broadcast area: Findlay, Ohio
- Frequency: 96.7 MHz
- Branding: Classic Hits 96.7

Programming
- Format: Classic hits
- Affiliations: Cincinnati Bengals Radio Network; Cincinnati Reds Radio Network; Rocket Sports Radio Network

Ownership
- Owner: Roppe Corporation (dba TCB Holdings, Inc.)
- Sister stations: WFOB

History
- First air date: 1946 (as WFOB-FM)
- Former call signs: WFOB-FM (1946–1987)

Technical information
- Licensing authority: FCC
- Facility ID: 67709
- Class: A
- ERP: 3,000 watts
- HAAT: 88 meters (289 feet)
- Transmitter coordinates: 41°6′0.2″N 83°28′31.7″W

Links
- Public license information: Public file; LMS
- Webcast: Listen Live
- Website: wbvi.com

WBVI (96.7 FM) is a commercially licensed radio station, broadcasting from Fostoria, Ohio, United States, but is marketed as a Findlay radio station. WBVI is owned and operated by the Roppe Corporation, but does business as TCB Holdings, Inc. It airs a Classic hits music format.

== History: beginnings as WFOB-FM ==
Going on the air in 1946, the station was known for many years as WFOB-FM. The station went on the air as a subsidiary of Seneca Radio Corporation, with studios and offices located at 125 South Main Street in Fostoria. Andrew Emerine was the company president, and Mel Murray was the general manager. Jim Huth served as program director. At that time, WFOB-FM broadcast at 105.5 FM and at a power of 450 watts. In 1950, WFOB-FM was granted permission to move to its present frequency and increase its power to 1,000 watts. Another power increase to 3,000 watts followed in 1967.

The call letters of WFOB-FM were changed to WBVI on July 6, 1987, one year following its acquisition by TCB Holdings, also known as Tri-County Broadcasting. The station was similarly formatted as its AM sister, but focused more on music. In an effort to market the station to a "listen-at-work" audience in Findlay, WBVI became known as Findlay's "Mellow Mix 96.7", affiliating with the "Soft Hits" soft adult contemporary format offered by Jones Radio Network.

Though marketing itself as a Findlay station, WBVI's programming operations continued to originate from the Fostoria studios at 101 North Main Street. However, TCB opened a branch sales office for the station at 1995 Tiffin Avenue in Findlay. This is where the FM station was located until moving back to Fostoria with its AM counterpart.

At the start of the 1990s, WBVI was one of the first stations in the Toledo market to invest in hard-disk audio storage technology, through the use of Digilink, the computer automation system developed by Arrakis Systems of Colorado.

== WBVI today ==
WBVI dropped the "Mellow" portion of its "Mellow Mix 96.7" name in the fall of 1996, moving to a more mainstream adult contemporary music format, while still using the Jones Satellite Network that the station had used for years under the previous brand. The station's "promo voice" also changed as the transition to a hotter sound continued.

The station's music format has since transitioned to Hot AC, using the "Bright AC" satellite format distributed by Dial Global (formerly Westwood One). Mix 96.7's satellite format mimics the Jack FM sound on weekends with "Anything Goes Weekends" featuring a variety of 1970s and 1980s classic hits.

Morning DJ KC Allen arrived as program director in the Fall of 1996, followed briefly by Tom Summers in 2001, and then Keith Hodkinson, following a brief tenure in the same capacity at nearby competitor WTTF-AM and WTTF-FM (now WCKY-FM) in Tiffin, Ohio and Kevin Kriss rocked the middays in the early 90's

The station broadcasts high school sports and is a member of the Cincinnati Bengals, Cincinnati Reds and Columbus Blue Jackets radio networks. In 2011, Mix 96.7 WBVI joined the Rocket Sports Radio Network, broadcasting selected University of Toledo football and men's basketball games.

On September 3, 2020, WBVI changed their format from hot adult contemporary to classic hits, branded as "Classic Hits 96.7".

== Gallery ==
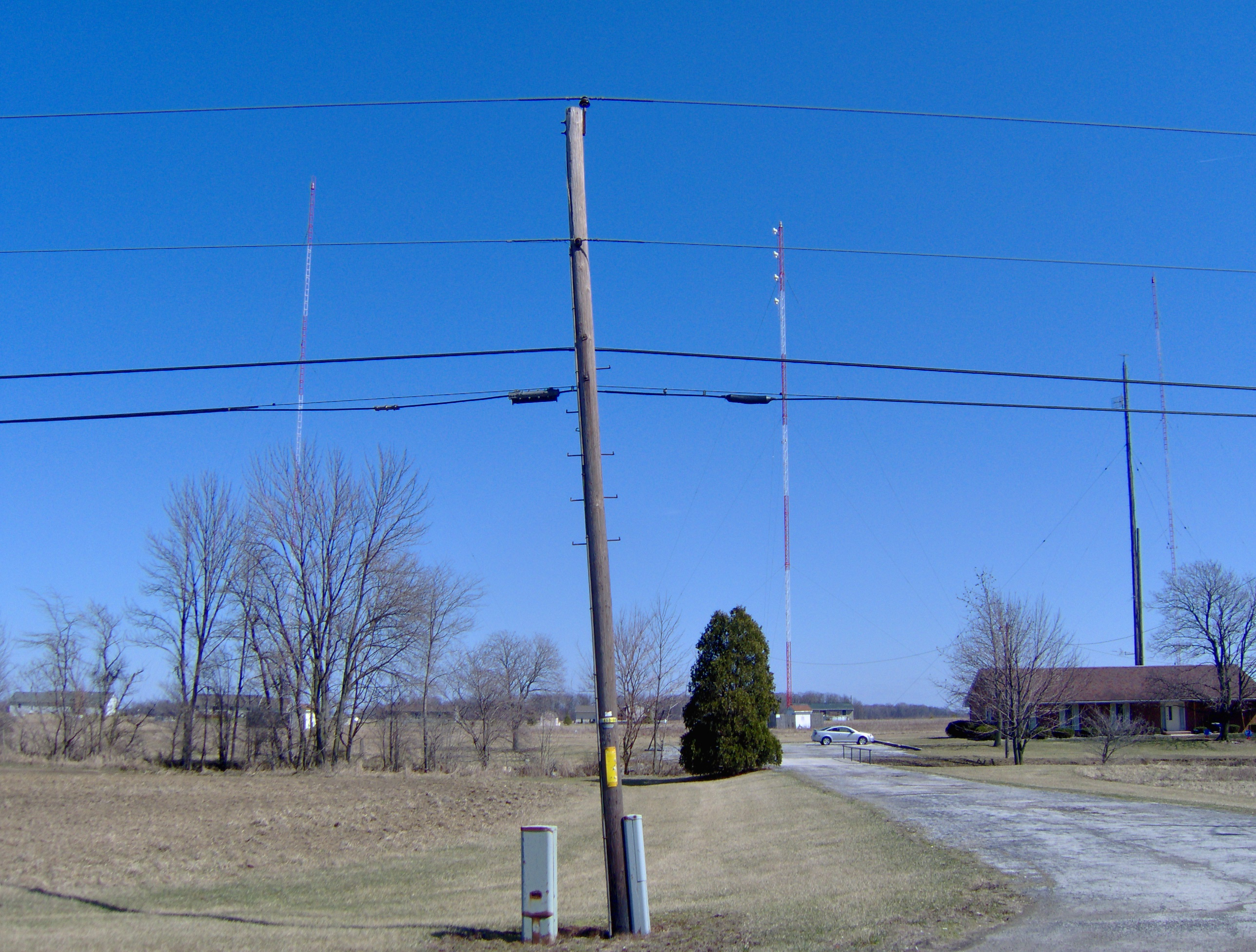
WFOB and WBVI transmitter site, at 1407 U.S. Route 23, south of Fostoria. This building had served as the WFOB and WBVI studios and offices for many years prior to the downtown move.

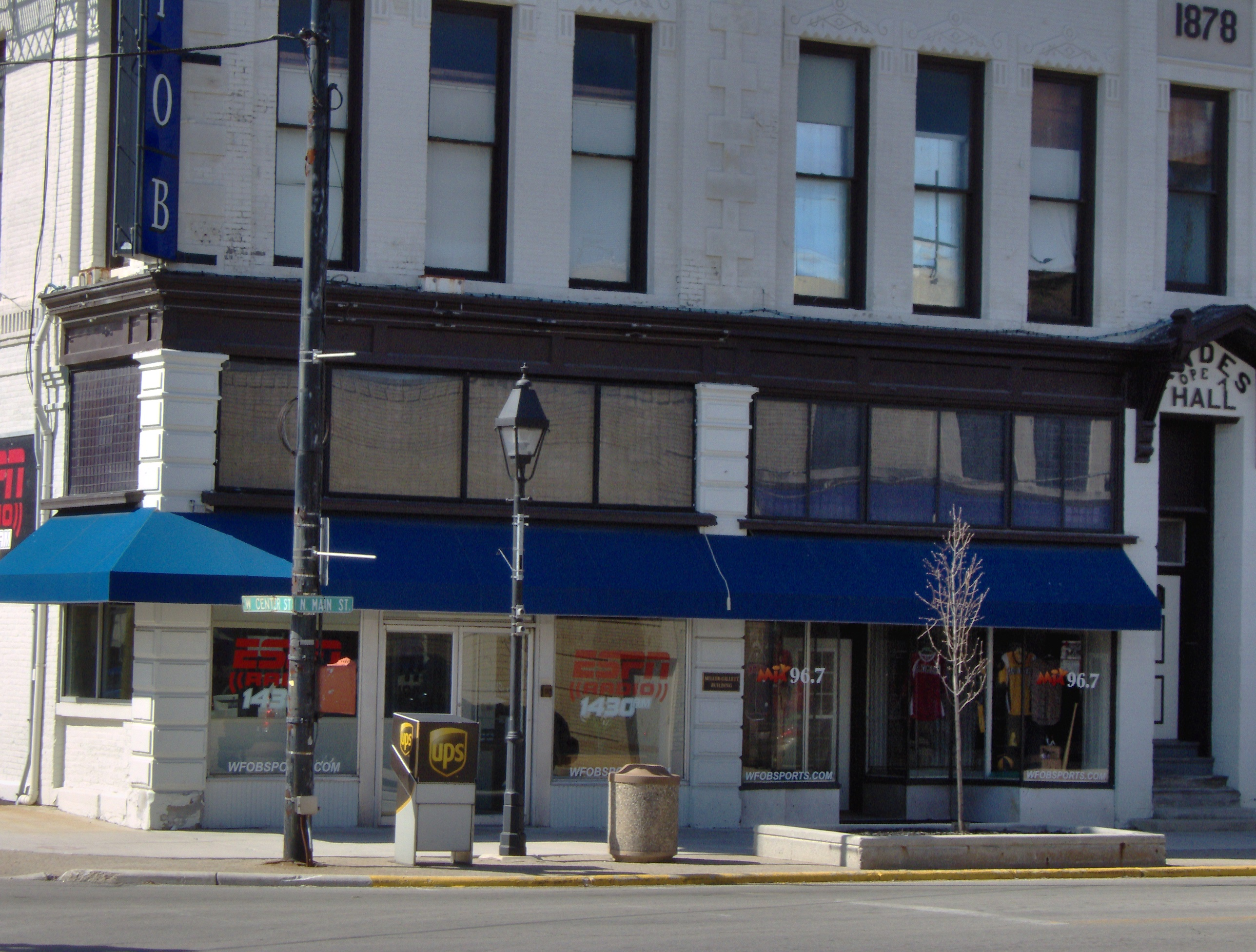
WFOB and WBVI studios and offices today, at 101 North Main Street, Fostoria

WFOB-FM's original tower, located in downtown Fostoria, near the intersection of its longtime location at 101 North Main Street in downtown Fostoria

WFOB-FM's original on-air studio

Jim Huth, one of WFOB-FM's original staff members
