= WFOB =

Radio station in Fostoria, Ohio

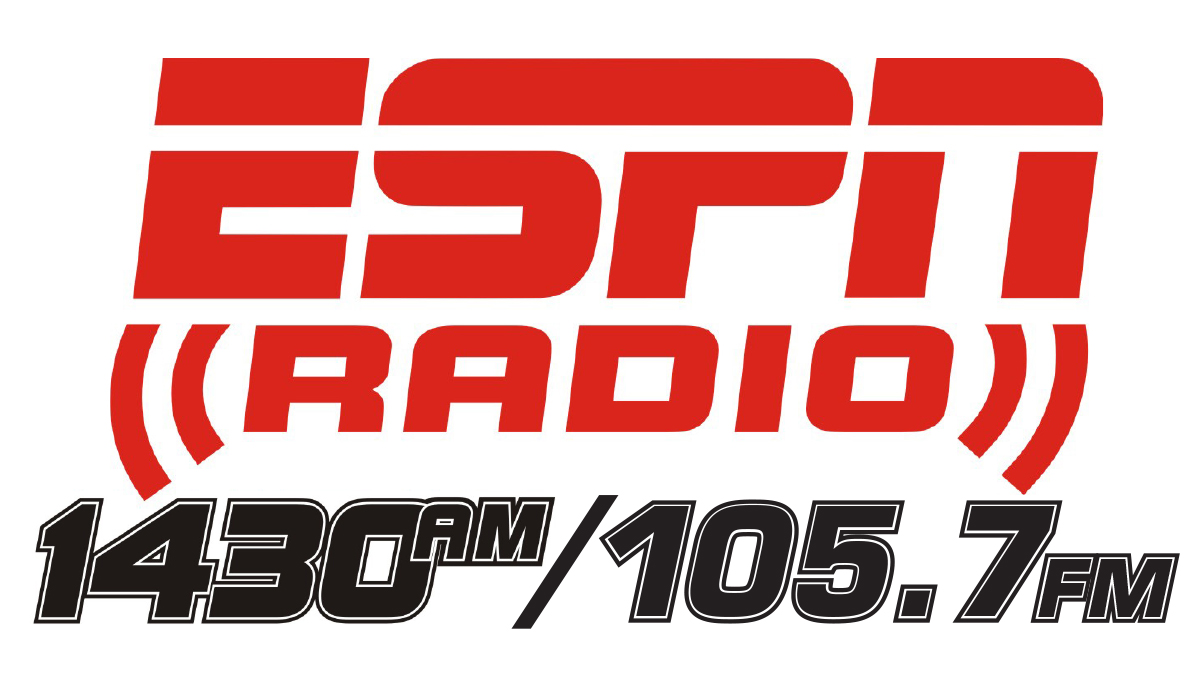
- Fostoria, Ohio; United States
- Broadcast area: Fostoria, Bowling Green and Findlay
- Frequency: 1430 kHz
- Branding: ESPN Radio 1430/105.7 WFOB

Programming
- Format: Sports
- Affiliations: ABC News; Cleveland Browns Radio Network; Cleveland Guardians Radio Network; ESPN Radio; Ohio State Sports Network

Ownership
- Owner: Roppe Corporation; (TCB Holdings, Inc.)
- Sister stations: WBVI

History
- First air date: December 9, 1952
- Call sign meaning: Fostoria, Bowling Green

Technical information
- Licensing authority: FCC
- Facility ID: 67699
- Class: B
- Power: 1,000 watts (unlimited)
- Transmitter coordinates: 41°06′06″N 83°23′59″W
- Translator: 105.7 W289CP (Fostoria)

Links
- Public license information: Public file; LMS
- Webcast: Listen live
- Website: wfob.com

WFOB (1430 AM) is a commercial radio station licensed to Fostoria, Ohio, United States, featuring a sports format with ESPN Radio programming.

== History ==
WFOB first went on the air in 1952, and was the third radio station to go on the air serving this immediate area, eleven years after the premiere of WFIN in Findlay, Ohio; the seat of government for Hancock County. At the time, there was no AM radio station on the air serving Seneca and Wood Counties. Its sister station, WFOB-FM (today’s WBVI), had been on the air since 1946, but because of its low power and the lack of FM radio receivers available at the time, it would be decades more before it would thrive. For many years, WFOB operated from its transmitter site at 1407 U.S. Route 23 just south of Fostoria, but would move to its present location at 101 North Main Street in downtown Fostoria by 1990.

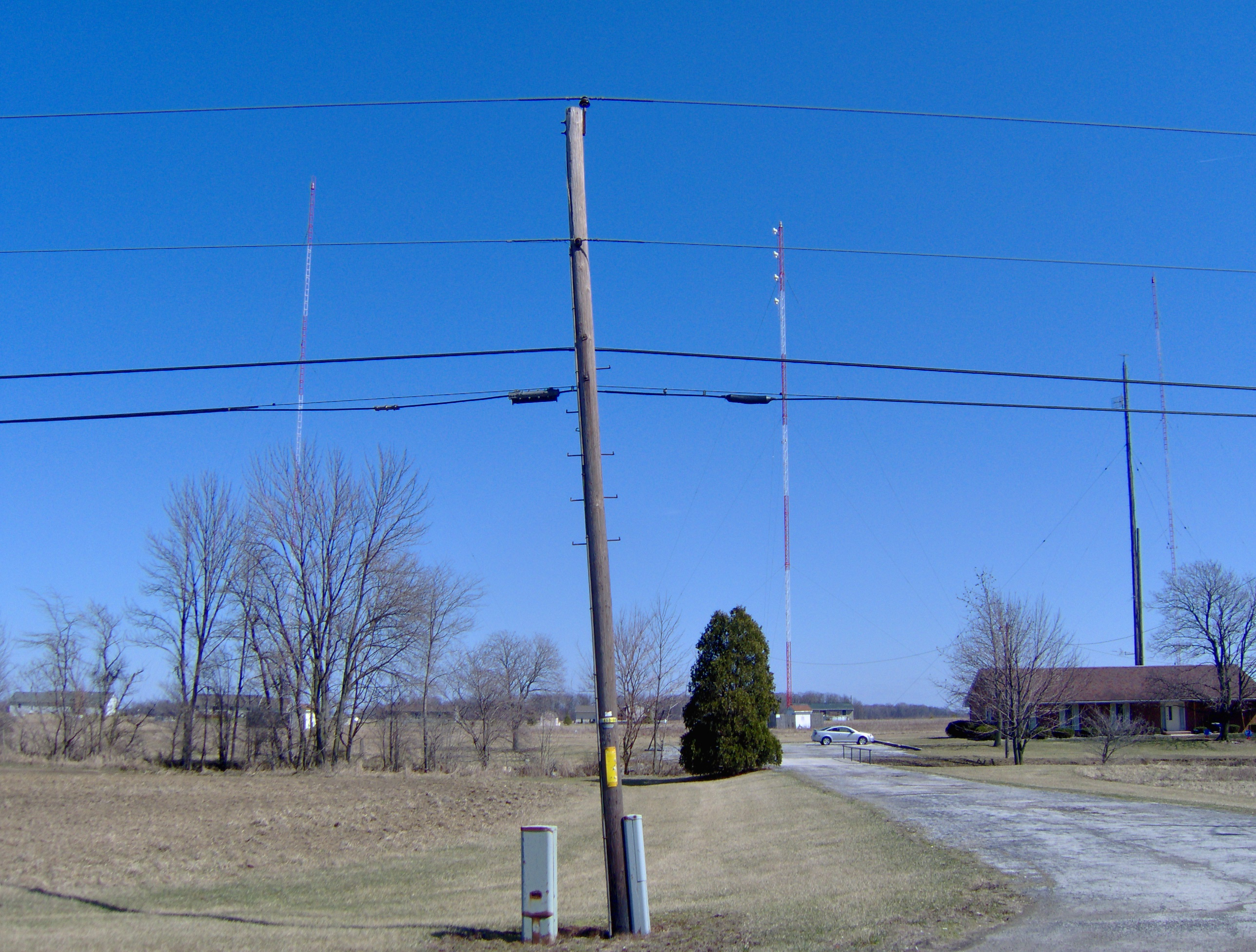
WFOB and WBVI transmitter site, at 1407 U.S. Route 23, south of Fostoria. This building had served as the WFOB and WBVI studios and offices for many years prior to the downtown move.

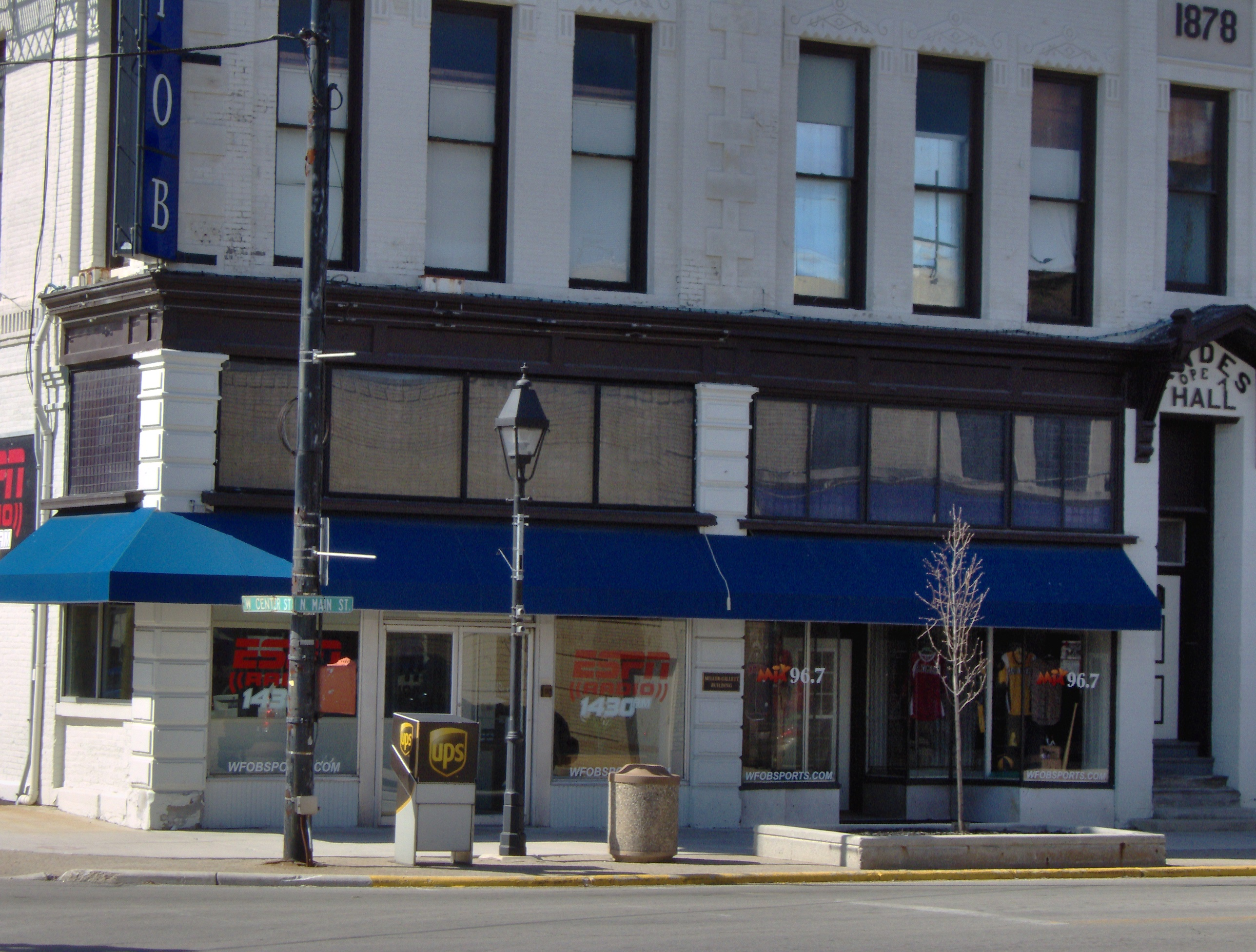
WFOB and WBVI studios and offices, at 101 North Main Street, Fostoria

Seneca Radio Corporation, which was the station's original owner, had decided to sell WFOB-AM-FM in 1986. Tri-County Broadcasting, also known as TCB Holdings, purchased WFOB and its sister station, WBVI. TCB Chairman Donald P. Miller, was also president of Roppe Corporation, known for its rubber products, particularly for matting staircases in office buildings and other commercial dwellings. Miller, a loyal Fostorian, purchased the station to assure the community that the mission of WFOB and WBVI would continue to be that of a "community first" radio station, and not turn its back on its community roots to serve Toledo or other area outside of its licensed community.

Under TCB's direction, WFOB thrived more than ever before, thanks to constant re-investment in the station, as technology continued to evolve over the years. Vinyl records and magnetic tape would be replaced by CDs, satellite technology and computer hard-disk audio storage, thus reducing periodic maintenance costs. WFOB's constant presence in the community from its local news coverage and broadcasting of special events further bolstered its position as a full-service station serving Seneca, Wood and Hancock Counties.

=== The power increase that wasn't ===
In 1989, WFOB listeners were able to hear their local radio station at a much greater distance. Prior to this time, WFOB's signal transmission would barely be heard in the Toledo city limits, due to the presence of another radio station, WBRB, broadcasting from the Detroit suburb of Mount Clemens, Michigan on the same frequency and with the same power and an almost identical antenna pattern propagation. WBRB, having been in financial difficulty for some time, fell silent in 1989. Attempts to find a buyer for the bankrupt station proved futile, and that station was silenced for good after competitor Walter Wolpin (who owned WCAR in Livonia) purchased the license and assets in a 1992 bankruptcy court sale, returning the license to the FCC, with its towers being dismantled the following year, and the razing of its studio building not long after that. After WBRB went off the air, WFOB's signal, no longer inhibited by WBRB, could be heard clearly in the Detroit Metropolitan Area except where adjacent channel interference from AM 1440 WMKM in the Detroit suburb of Inkster was too great.

WFOB serves both Fostoria and Bowling Green, the county seat of Wood County, and the home of Bowling Green State University. To better serve the listeners of Bowling Green, TCB built a second studio facility for WFOB on the second floor of a building in downtown Bowling Green. This studio was staffed by its own news director, who would also break in with local news and sports from the Wood County area, and also serve as a satellite sales office for reps selling WFOB and WBVI airtime in this area. Transmissions were made from this studio to the main Fostoria facility via FM STL microwave.

== WFOB today ==
WFOB continued into the beginning of the twenty-first century as a full-service news, weather, sports and music station, with the music being a blend of Adult Contemporary and Oldies. The station eventually used ABC Radio's Memories and then Timeless Favorites programming during some day parts.

WFOB on Monday, September 1, 2008 dropped all music programming and began broadcasting ESPN Radio. It also aired local news, weather and sports such as the Cleveland Indians and Cleveland Browns. (It had held the local broadcasting rights to the Indians, Browns, and Ohio State University football and basketball prior to the switch.)

On June 1, 2009, WFOB switched to Sporting News Radio and also added The Dan Patrick Show to its lineup along with reinstating a live weekday morning show originating from Fostoria. The morning show is hosted was Josh Hohman and Vic Travagliante (www.wfob.com/mornings) . WFOB also provides local sports programming, including local high school football and basketball along with local shows such as "The Sports Huddle" hosted by Vic Travagliante and "Scoreboard Show" hosted by Burley Stapley, Brian Cooper and Shannon Miller during the football season and Vic Travagliante & Josh Hohman during the basketball season. WFOB broadcasts professional sports including the Cleveland Guardians, Cleveland Cavaliers, Toledo Mud Hens and Cleveland Browns as well as the Ohio State University (Football, Men's & Women's Basketball)

WFOB was also one of the first stations in the country to invest in AM stereo technology. The FCC didn't adopt a standard for AM Stereo until 1993. Following the lead of other stations who had given up on it, WFOB dropped its AM stereo transmission in 2005.

WFOB has enjoyed a long history of tenured personnel over the years such as Kevin Kriss, Burley Stapley, Mike Fry, and John Conlin. Donald and Judy Miller currently oversee the operation of the station.

WFOBsports.com is the station's online source for high school sports in the Hancock, Wood and Seneca County region, and generally broadcasts football and basketball. During the fall, WFOBsports.com consists of an online portal, where every Friday night, and many Saturdays as well, local high school sports can be heard through the calls of Trevor Newby, the voice of WFOBsports.com.

On August 1, 2011, Sporting News Radio changed its branding to become Yahoo! Sports Radio. WFOB changed along with the network to be known as WFOB 1430- Yahoo! Sports Radio.

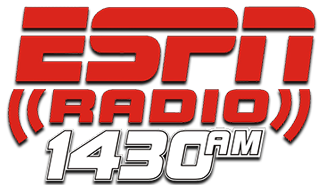
Logo before translator sign on

On August 5, 2015, WFOB became again ESPN Radio 1430 WFOB. The station continues to carry Cleveland Guardians, Cleveland Browns, Cleveland Cavaliers, Ohio State Buckeyes, Toledo Mudhens and Fostoria Redmen, along with other area high schools, sporting events.

In 2016, Lance Morris was hired as sports director, ushering in a new era at WFOB. The tenure was marked by a shift to younger on-air talent. The Psych-up and Scoreboard shows were anchored by Brendan Hall and Chase Bachman in 2018. Bachman returned for the next two seasons to host the program with Shayne Nissen. The Sports Huddle is now hosted by Morris and Matt Cotman.
