= WBNS TV Tower =

Television tower in Columbus, Ohio

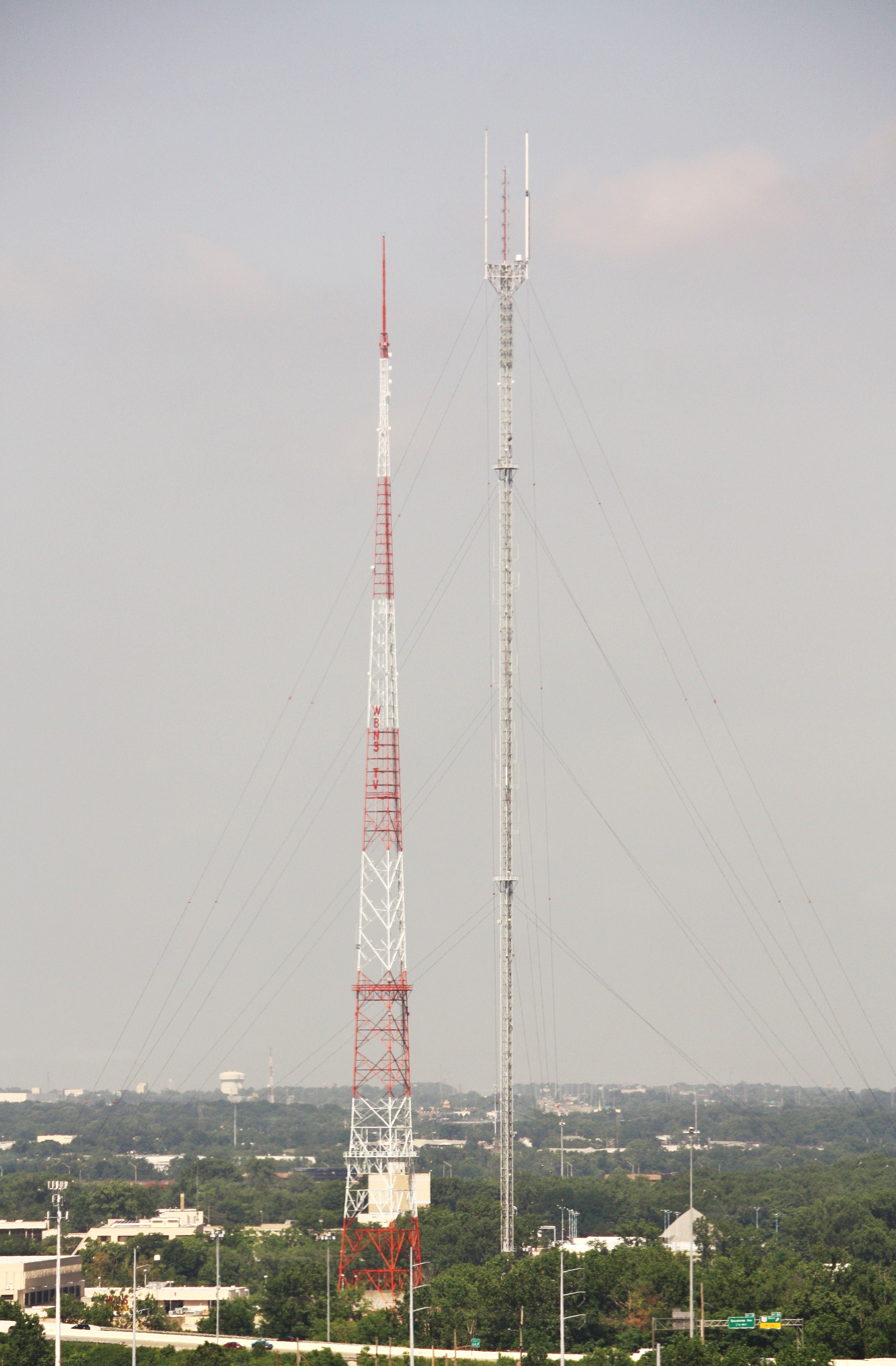
- Interactive map of the WBNS TV Tower area

General information
- Status: Completed
- Type: Steel lattice television tower
- Location: Columbus, Ohio
- Coordinates: 39°58′13″N 83°01′27″W
- Completed: 1948

Height
- Height: 255.7 m (839 ft)

The WBNS TV Tower is a 839 ft (256 m) tall free-standing lattice tower with a triangular cross section used by WBNS-TV in Columbus, Ohio.

When originally completed in August 1948, the tower stood 595 ft (181 m) tall making it one of the tallest freestanding towers in the United States at that time. The tower's height was either later increased or a new tower was built in 1955–1956, at which point it became the second tallest lattice tower in the United States after the WTVR TV Tower which had been built two years prior in 1953. The tower remains to this day the tallest free-standing structure in Columbus, Ohio and one of the tallest in the country. In 1981, WBNS-TV and WBNS-FM broadcast were switched over to an even taller guyed candelabra tower located directly adjacent to the WNBS Tower standing 313.3 m (1,028 ft) in height. WCMH-TV and most of Columbus' FM radio stations also broadcast from the candelabra tower.

== See also ==
- Lattice tower
- List of famous transmission sites
