= World Children's Transplant Fund =

International non-governmental organization

- Abbreviation: WCTF
- Formation: 1988; 38 years ago
- Founder: Mark Kroeker
- Founded at: Los Angeles, California, U.S.A.
- Type: Non-governmental organization
- Purpose: “A world where children in need of organ transplants will have the opportunity regardless of where they live.”

The World Children's Transplant Fund (WCTF) is an international, non-governmental organization founded in Los Angeles, California in 1988, with a focus on providing financial and emotional support to children and their families of the world needing organ transplants.

== Background ==
The Secretariat of the World Children's Transplant Fund is located in Encino, Los Angeles. It is governed by a steering committee.

According to its website, WCTF is "dedicated to developing organ transplant centers in regions of the world where resources are scarce and transplants are most needed, and investing in training and technology to establish pediatric organ transplantation capabilities in international communities that lack services."

The organization promotes and supports the Convention on the Rights of the Child and is a member of the Union of International Associations.

The organization currently operates regional transplant centers in Argentina, Costa Rica, and the United States.

=== History ===
In 1997, WCTF joined the Nicholas Green Foundation, Coalition on Transplantation, and the American Share Foundation to form the American Share Coalition on Transplantation (ASCOT) for the 1997 International Transplant Congresses.
