= WLRQ-FM =

- Cocoa, Florida; United States
- Broadcast area: Space Coast
- Frequency: 99.3 MHz (HD Radio)
- Branding: Lite Rock 99.3

Programming
- Format: Adult contemporary
- Affiliations: Premiere Networks

Ownership
- Owner: iHeartMedia, Inc.; (iHM Licenses, LLC)
- Sister stations: WFKS, WMMB, WMMV

History
- First air date: June 23, 1982
- Former call signs: WEZY-FM (1982–1988)
- Call sign meaning: "Lite Rock"

Technical information
- Licensing authority: FCC
- Facility ID: 20372
- Class: C2
- ERP: 50,000 watts
- HAAT: 150 meters (490 ft)
- Transmitter coordinates: 28°16′42.00″N 80°42′3.00″W

Links
- Public license information: Public file; LMS
- Webcast: Listen live (via iHeartRadio)
- Website: literock993.iheart.com

WLRQ-FM (99.3 FM "Lite Rock 99.3") is a commercial radio station licensed to Cocoa, Florida, United States, and serving the Space Coast including Melbourne and Brevard County. The station is owned by iHeartMedia, Inc. and broadcasts an adult contemporary radio format.

The station broadcasts using HD Radio technology.

== History ==
On June 23, 1982, the station signed on the air. The call sign was WEZY-FM, with the EZ standing for easy listening and beautiful music. WEZY-FM played quarter hour sweeps of mostly instrumental cover versions of popular songs, as well as Broadway and Hollywood show tunes. But by the 1980s, the easy listening format was aging. At first WEZY-FM added more soft vocals and reduced the instrumentals. But by the late 1980s, it had made the transition to soft adult contemporary.

On January 15, 1988, the station changed its call sign to WLRQ-FM. The new call letters helped separate the station from its beautiful music past, aiming at a more youthful audience, representing the new moniker "Lite Rock".
