= WMMB =

WMMB and WMMV
WMMB: Melbourne, Florida; WMMV: Cocoa, Florida; United States
- Broadcast area: Space Coast
- Frequencies: WMMB: 1240 kHz; WMMV: 1350 kHz
- Branding: News Talk WMMB 1240 / 1350

Programming
- Format: Talk radio
- Affiliations: Fox News Radio; Compass Media Networks; Premiere Networks; Westwood One

Ownership
- Owner: iHeartMedia, Inc.; (iHM Licenses, LLC)
- Sister stations: WFKS, WLRQ-FM

History
- First air date: WMMB: 1946; WMMV: 1957
- Former call signs: WMMV: WLRQ (1987–1991); WWHL (1991–1995); WMYM (1995–1997)

Technical information
- Licensing authority: FCC
- Facility ID: WMMB: 11408; WMMV: 20371
- Class: WMMB: C; WMMV: B
- Power: WMMB: 1,000 watts (unlimited); WMMV: 1,000 watts
- Transmitter coordinates: WMMB: 28°4′41.1″N 80°35′54.2″W; WMMV: 28°21′58″N 80°45′08″W
- Translator(s): WMMB: 92.7 W224DJ (Melbourne)

Links
- Public license information: WMMB: Public file; LMS; WMMV: Public file; LMS
- Webcast: Listen live (via iHeartRadio)
- Website: wmmbam.iheart.com

WMMB (1240 AM) and WMMV (1350 AM) are commercial radio stations simulcasting a talk radio format. WMMB is licensed to Melbourne, Florida, United States, and WMMV is licensed to Cocoa, Florida. The stations are owned by iHeartMedia, Inc. and the license is held by iHM Licenses, LLC. The radio studios and offices are on South Babcock Street in Melbourne.

In Melbourne, programming can also be heard on low-power FM translator W224DJ at 92.7 MHz.

== Programming ==
Weekdays begin with a local news and information show, "Bill Mick Live." The rest of the weekday schedule is made up of nationally syndicated conservative talk shows. The stations also broadcast Miami Dolphins football games in the fall.

== History ==
WMMB first signed on the air in 1946. The station that became WMMV went on the air in 1957.

== Translator ==
Broadcast translator for WMMB
Call sign	Frequency	City of license	FID	ERP (W)	HAAT	Class	Transmitter coordinates	FCC info
W224DJ	92.7 FM	Melbourne, Florida	139444	250	151 m (495 ft)	D	28°8′13″N 80°42′12″W	LMS

Former logo
