= WBNS-TV =

Television station in Columbus, Ohio

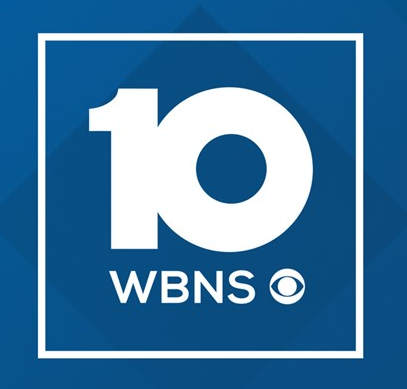
- Columbus, Ohio; United States
- Channels: Digital: 21 (UHF); Virtual: 10
- Branding: 10TV

Programming
- Affiliations: 10.1: CBS; for others, see § Subchannels

Ownership
- Owner: Tegna Inc., a subsidiary of Nexstar Media Group; (WBNS-TV, Inc.)
- Sister stations: WBNS, WBNS-FM; Nexstar: WCMH-TV

History
- Founded: March 17, 1948
- First air date: October 15, 1949
- Former channel numbers: Analog: 10 (VHF, 1949–2009)
- Call sign meaning: "Wolfe Bank Newspaper and Shoes" (from WBNS radio)

Technical information
- Licensing authority: FCC
- Facility ID: 71217
- ERP: 1,000 kW
- HAAT: 279 m (915 ft)
- Transmitter coordinates: 39°58′15.5″N 83°1′39.2″W

Links
- Public license information: Public file; LMS
- Website: www.10tv.com

WBNS-TV (channel 10) is a television station in Columbus, Ohio, United States, affiliated with CBS. It is owned by the Tegna subsidiary of Nexstar Media Group alongside two radio stations, WBNS (1460 AM) and WBNS-FM (97.1); Nexstar also owns NBC affiliate WCMH-TV (channel 4). The WBNS stations share studios on Twin Rivers Drive west of Downtown Columbus, where WBNS-TV's transmitter is also located.

WBNS-TV also serves as the CBS affiliate of record for the nearby Zanesville, Ohio, market.

Before its purchase in August 2019 by Tegna, WBNS-TV was the flagship station of founding owner Dispatch Broadcast Group, whose operations also included WTHR, the NBC affiliate in Indianapolis, and WALV-CD, Indianapolis' MeTV outlet and an alternate NBC affiliate; all of Dispatch's stations were with Tegna.

== History ==
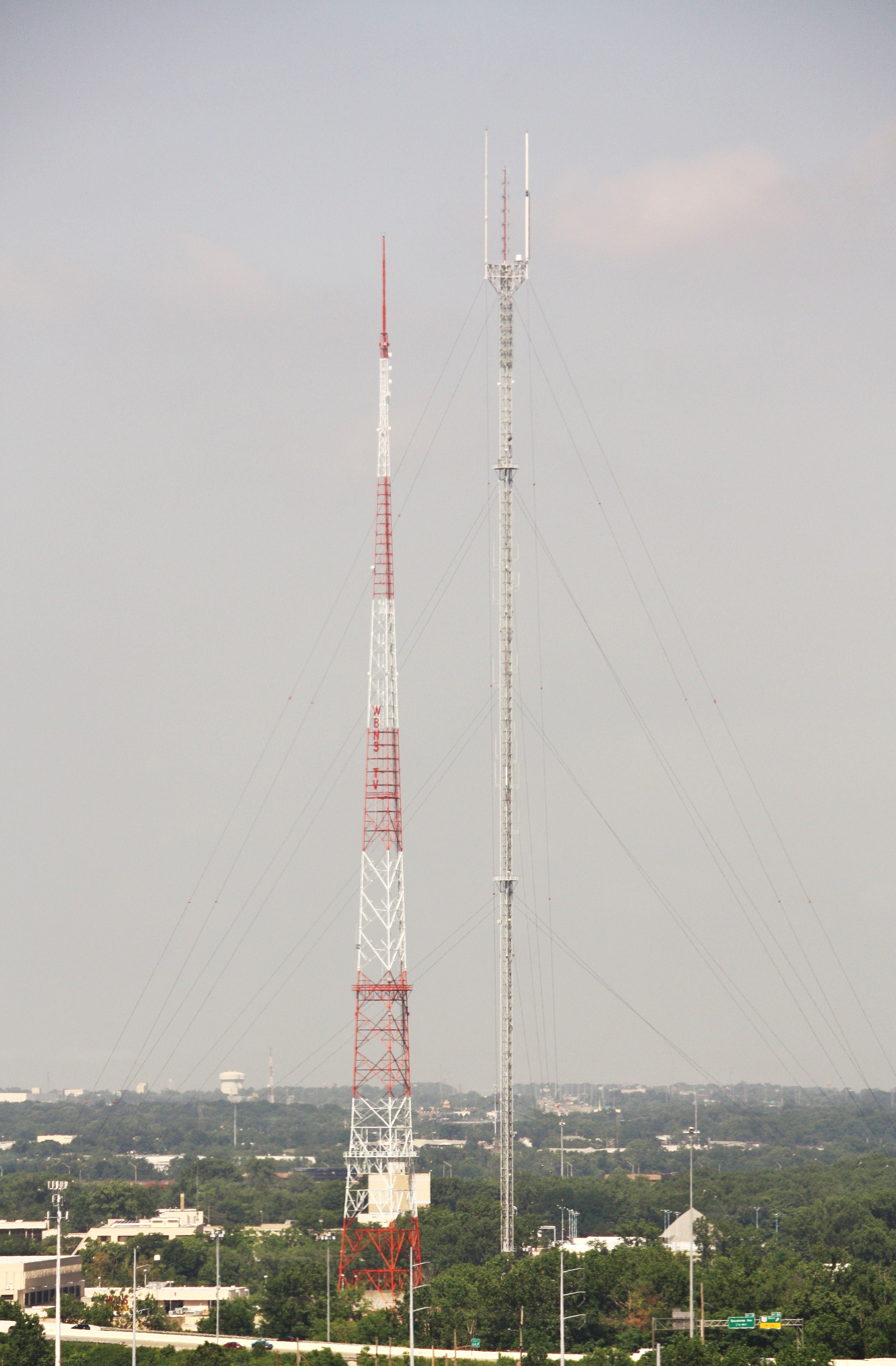
Former WBNS-TV broadcast tower (left), next to the candelabra tower from which WBNS-TV and WBNS-FM now broadcast. WCMH-TV and most of Columbus' FM radio stations also broadcast from the candelabra tower.

=== Until 1995 ===
WBNS-TV began operations on October 15, 1949. Channel 10 has been an affiliate of the CBS television network since its inception, owing to WBNS radio's affiliation with the CBS Radio Network for almost 20 years. It is currently the ninth longest-tenured CBS affiliate. Channel 10 has used the on-air branding of 10TV since 1977. It is also one of only a few stations in the country to have had the same call letters and primary network affiliation throughout its history.

The WBNS call letters stand for "Wolfe, Banks, News, and Shoes", the businesses owned by the company's longtime owners, the Wolfe family. Channel 10 maintained common ownership with The Columbus Dispatch, the city's lone remaining daily newspaper and the "N" in the station's call letters, until 2015 under an exemption of the Federal Communications Commission (FCC)'s cross-ownership rules. The FCC has largely prohibited common ownership of co-located print and broadcast media since the mid-1970s. The Wolfe family, who purchased the Dispatch in 1905, sold the newspaper and related assets to New Media Investment Group in June 2015.

WBNS-TV was known for its locally produced shows Flippo the Clown, Luci's Toyshop, Franz the Toymaker, The Judge, and programs hosted by popular Columbus Zoo and Aquarium personality Jack Hanna (Hanna's Ark). The station also featured "Fritz the Nite Owl", who hosted midnight movies during the 1970s, and the Sunday state government talk show called Capital Square in the 1990s. Throughout much of the 1990s and early years of the millennium, WBNS-TV was home to the 10TV Kids News Network (KNN); a local show, "produced by kids, for kids". The half-hour show aired Saturday mornings. Several KNN kids have gone on to pursue careers in television news or public relations in central Ohio.

=== Since 1995 ===
In 1995, WBNS-TV replaced Cleveland's WJW-TV as the default affiliate in the Mansfield area (part of the Cleveland–Akron DMA) after WJW became a Fox broadcast outlet. The new Cleveland CBS affiliate, WOIO, unlike WBNS-TV, did not reach Mansfield with a Grade B signal. WBNS also replaced Toledo CBS affiliate WTOL on cable television in the Lima DMA.

The first live high-definition broadcast on the station's digital signal took place in September 1998 in which the broadcast was a football game between Ohio State and West Virginia, making the station a pioneer in American digital television. The station claims this to have been the first locally produced HD broadcast in the U.S.; however, as several other stations throughout the country also lay claim to this distinction, the veracity cannot be verified. It is widely considered the first ever live sporting event in HD in the U.S. produced using a production truck and transmission vehicle from NHK, Japan's national public broadcasting organization.

Working with sister company Radio Sound Network, WBNS-TV, WBNS (AM) and Ohio News Network (ONN) produced and distributed on a Streaming media platform the Ohio State spring football game in 2001. It was one of the first live sporting events in the U.S. to be streamed. The game was delivered on RealVideo, a compressed video format, on the RealPlayer media player platform on the station's website. It also was distributed to Windows Mobile mobile devices using the Windows Media Player format, including Compaq's IPAQ personal digital assistant which required an ExpressCard to connect to the Internet.

On June 11, 2019, Dispatch announced it would sell its broadcasting assets, including the WBNS stations, to Tegna Inc. for $535 million in cash. Coinciding with WBNS-TV's 70th anniversary, the deal ended the Wolfe family's involvement in local media after over a century. At the time of the sale announcement, channel 10 was the only major television station in Columbus still owned by Ohio-based interests.

The sale was approved by the FCC on July 29, 2019, and was completed on August 8. WBNS-TV became Tegna's third television station located in Ohio, operating alongside fellow CBS affiliate WTOL in Toledo and NBC affiliate WKYC in Cleveland.

On August 19, 2025, Nexstar Media Group announced it would acquire Tegna. In Columbus, Nexstar already owns WCMH-TV. The deal was completed on March 19, 2026. A temporary restraining order issued one week later by the U.S. District Court for the Eastern District of California, later escalated to a preliminary injunction, has prevented WBNS AM/FM/TV from being integrated into WCMH. Ohio Attorney General Dave Yost reached a deal with Nexstar on April 30, 2026, under which, if the injunction were to be lifted, Nexstar would maintain the existing local program output and editorially independent news departments between WBNS and WCMH through 2030.

== Programming ==
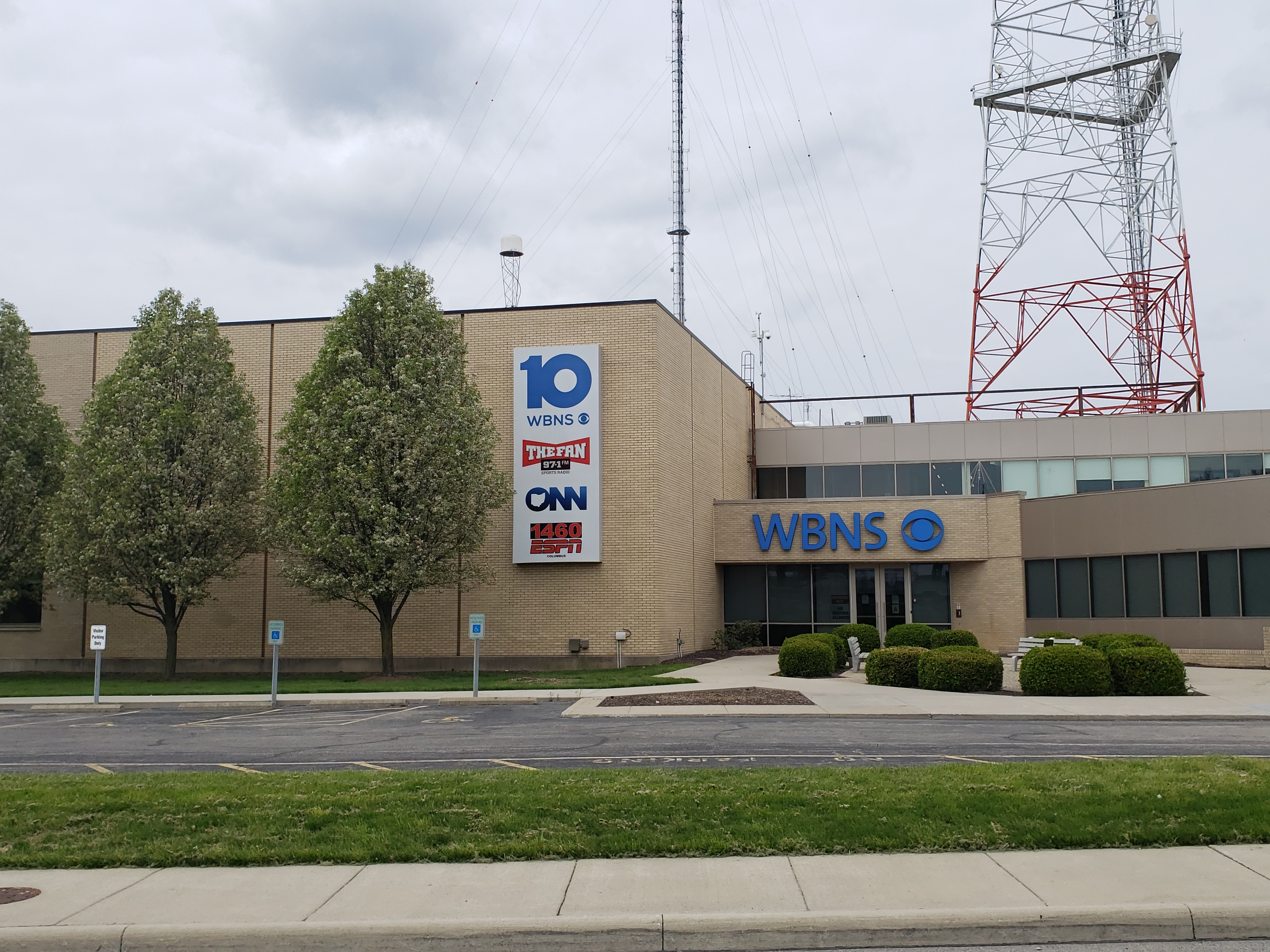
WBNS-TV studios in 2021. The studio also houses WBNS AM and FM.

=== Sports programming ===
WBNS-TV has strong ties to the athletic department of the Ohio State University. For many years, it has produced the coaches' shows for both the football and men's basketball teams, along with other shows about Ohio State athletics. Additionally, its radio sister has been the flagship station of Ohio State football and basketball for decades. Prior to the launch of the Big Ten Network in September 2007, the station aired Ohio State games offered by ESPN Plus in both sports, including prime time preemptions of CBS network programming for games. Because of the Big Ten Network's exclusive contracts to cover live Ohio State sports, WBNS now only carries selected CBS Big Ten basketball broadcasts on weekends and latter portions of the conference tourney, although the programming outside of live sports remains produced by WBNS-TV; WSYX-DT3 and WCMH-TV currently air Ohio State football games through their affiliations with Fox and NBC and those respective networks' contracts with the Big Ten Conference. Since 2023, WBNS-TV has carried select Ohio State football games through the Big Ten on CBS as part of the network's new deal with the Big Ten Conference. The station provides local coverage of the PGA Tour's Memorial Tournament, which is held at Muirfield Village Golf Club in Dublin, Ohio.

=== News operation ===
WBNS presently broadcasts 37 hours of locally produced newscasts each week (with six hours each weekday, three hours on Saturdays and four hours on Sundays).

WBNS-TV was the first television station in the Columbus market to debut a news helicopter, "10TV SkyCam" (now "Chopper 10") in 1979, satellite news truck "10TV Skybeam" in 1986 and launch the Ohio News Network in 1997, which shared studio and office space with WBNS until ONN ended on August 31, 2012.

The first major challenge to Channel 10's dominance occurred in 1985, two years after WCMH began featuring the popular anchor team (and then-married couple) of Doug Adair and Mona Scott. From then until the mid-2000s, WBNS-TV and WCMH alternated holding the dominant ratings position for their 11 p.m. newscasts (and were virtually tied for ratings leads). However, since 2002, WBNS-TV has returned to a dominant position due to stronger CBS programming and CBS' reacquisition of Sunday-afternoon NFL telecasts. WBNS-TV usually rotates games among the two teams with the largest followings in the Columbus market—the Cincinnati Bengals and Cleveland Browns (both of whom are part of the CBS package for the American Football Conference). When possible, WBNS also airs games of the Pittsburgh Steelers, a division rival of the Bengals and Browns whose fan base extends into portions of the WBNS viewing area.

During Super Bowl XLI, channel 10 debuted a large marketing campaign to promote the launch of 10TV News in high definition. The song "Carousels (Dreaming of Tomorrow)" by Columbus rock band Alamoth Lane was used throughout the course of the campaign. Some of the band members were shot playing on the roof of WBNS with the Columbus skyline behind them. The song was also used to promote sister station WTHR's 50th anniversary in 2007.

The station began making preparations for the transition to HD in late March 2007, and debuted its 5 p.m. newscast in high definition on April 2, becoming the first television station in Central Ohio to produce newscasts in HD. The station's newscasts are now known as 10TV News; 10TV News HD was used from 2007 to 2012, after being known as 10TV Eyewitness News for many years.

On November 7, 2008, WBNS-TV's morning-noon anchor Heather Pick died of breast cancer. Pick learned in 2004 that the disease she overcame in 1999 had returned. In her last public appearance, she hosted the "Spirit Celebration with Heather Pick", raising almost $500,000 for the Columbus Cancer Clinic.

On January 3, 2011, WBNS expanded its weekday morning newscast to 2 1/2 hours, starting at 4:25 am. Weekend anchors Jeff Hogan and Angela An replaced Chuck Strickler and Anietra Hamper as anchors, and weeknight 5:30 p.m. anchor Tracy Townsend replaced Hamper and Strickler as noon anchors.

On May 11, 2011, WBNS-TV gained high-profile advertising when WBNS logos and a news ticker replaced those belonging to WCMH-TV on the Casto Building at the corner of High and Broad streets in downtown Columbus. Beginning in 2008, the building was leased by rival station WCMH-TV to house its NBC 4 on the Square newscast. When WCMH discontinued the newscast, WBNS assumed the lease but decided not to use the street-level studio space.

On October 1, 2012, WBNS-TV launched a redesigned set.

On September 17, 2013, Maria Tiberi, the 21-year-old daughter of WBNS-TV sports director Dom Tiberi, was killed in a car accident along Interstate 270 in Hilliard. Although authorities stated that Maria was distracted at the time of the accident, they did not claim that the distraction was a cell phone. In honor of Maria, WBNS has launched a campaign known as "Maria's Message", an awareness program which aims to prevent such accidents from occurring. On April 8, 2014, the 130th Ohio General Assembly passed Senate Bill 294, which officially designated September as "Safe Driving Awareness Month" in honor of Maria. The bill was signed into law by Governor John Kasich in June of that year.

In December 2019, the station named Ashlee Baracy as Chief Meteorologist, replacing Mike Davis, who was fired following his arrest on child pornography charges.

On March 13, 2020, WBNS-TV adopted Tegna's standardized news graphics and "C Clarity" theme, seven months after Tegna acquired the station.

==== Notable alumni ====
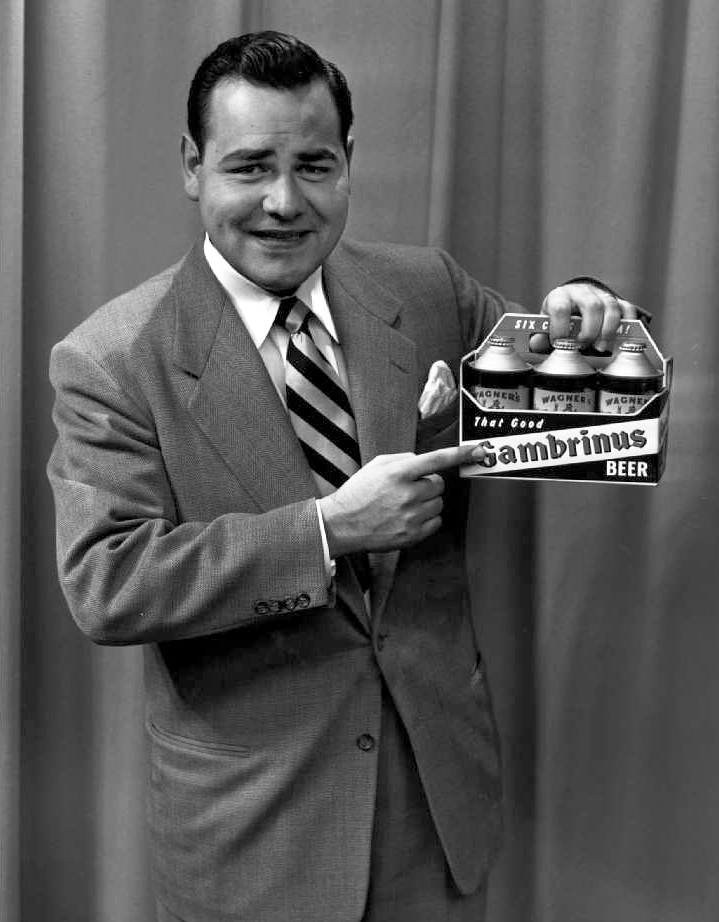
Comedian Jonathan Winters, then known as Johnny Winters, promoting Gambrinus Beer in the early 1950s for August Wagner Breweries, Inc. on WBNS-TV in Columbus, Ohio.

- Sharyl Attkisson – former reporter
- Keith Cate – weekend anchor (1988–1993)
- Carol Costello – 6 and 11 p.m. anchor (1990–1992)
- Jay Crawford – sports anchor (1993–1998)
- Faith Daniels – daytime anchor (1982–1983)
- Mike Gleason – sports announcer (1987–1998)
- Jack Hanna – program host (Hanna's Ark and Front Page Saturday Night)
- Phil Keating – reporter (1993)
- Dave Malkoff – overnight update anchor/associate producer
- Ron Olsen – reporter
- Heather Pick – weekday morning and noon anchor (2002–2008)
- Gary Radnich – sports director/anchor (1982–1985)
- Jerry Revish - news anchor/reporter (1980–2019)
- Rod Serling – writer, producer and creator of The Twilight Zone
- Dana Tyler – evening anchor (1981–1990)
- Jonathan Winters – performer and comedian

== Technical information ==
=== Subchannels ===
The station's digital signal is multiplexed:

Subchannels of WBNS-TV
Subchannel	Res.	Short name	Programming
10.1	1080i	WBNS TV	CBS
10.2	480i	MeTV	MeTV
10.3	480i	Dabl	Dabl
10.4	480i	Crime	True Crime Network
10.5	480i	Quest	Quest
10.6	480i	SHOP LC	Shop LC
10.7	480i	BUSTED	Busted
10.8	480i	ION +	Ion Plus

WBNS-TV broadcasts in Dolby 5.1 and uses its SAP channel for varying purposes, including simulcasts of its radio sister and simulcasts of NOAA weather radio, along with Descriptive Video Service (DVS) and Spanish-language NFL coverage from CBS.

On June 12, 2009, WBNS-TV launched Doppler 10 Now, a weather subchannel, carried on channel 10.2, based on the Local AccuWeather platform. On May 28, 2013, WBNS-TV announced that the 10.2 subchannel would begin carrying Antenna TV. WBNS' promotions for the network, tagged as "Ridiculously Retro", showcase clips from Flippo the Clown and Luci's Toyshop, hinting that old, local favorites could return to the airwaves, but that did not happen. On June 16, 2015, Antenna TV was replaced with Decades on channel 10.2. Then on October 1, 2017, WBNS-TV activated channel 10.3 and moved Decades there, replacing it with Heroes & Icons on channel 10.2. On September 26, 2019, Heroes & Icons was replaced with MeTV on channel 10.2 after WCMH-TV dropped MeTV carriage in favor of Court TV. At midnight on January 1, 2020, Decades was dropped from channel 10.3 and replaced with Dabl. Decades carriage moved to WCBZ-CD channel 22.5. Early in 2023, Circle was replaced with Shop LC on 10.6.

=== Analog-to-digital conversion ===
WBNS-TV shut down its analog signal, over VHF channel 10, on June 12, 2009, as part of the federally mandated transition from analog to digital television. The station's digital signal remained on its pre-transition UHF channel 21, using virtual channel 10.

== Retransmission disputes ==
As of September 15, 2012, the high-definition feed for WBNS-TV was dropped from Dish Network due to a contractual dispute between the two sides.

On September 6, 2017, WBNS and Indianapolis sister station WTHR, in both SD and HD formats, were pulled from their respective local AT&T U-verse and DirecTV channel lineups in a dispute over retransmission licensing fees.
