= WBNS (AM) =

Radio station in Columbus, Ohio

- Columbus, Ohio; United States
- Broadcast area: Columbus, Ohio
- Frequency: 1460 kHz
- Branding: The Fan 2

Programming
- Format: Sports radio
- Affiliations: BetMGM; Westwood One; Ohio State Sports Network

Ownership
- Owner: Tegna Inc., a subsidiary of Nexstar Media Group; (RadiOhio, Incorporated)
- Sister stations: WBNS-FM, WBNS-TV; Nexstar: WCMH-TV

History
- First air date: 1922
- Former call signs: WCAH (1922–1934)
- Call sign meaning: "Wolfe Bank Newspaper and Shoes"

Technical information
- Licensing authority: FCC
- Facility ID: 54901
- Class: B
- Power: 5,000 watts (day); 1,000 watts (night)
- Transmitter coordinates: 39°57′6.2″N 82°54′22.6″W
- Repeater: (97.1-2) WBNS-FM HD2 (Columbus)

Links
- Public license information: Public file; LMS
- Webcast: Listen live
- Website: 971thefan.com

WBNS (1460 AM, "The Fan 2") is a commercial radio station licensed to Columbus, Ohio, United States, carrying a sports and sports betting format with BetMGM and Westwood One Sports programming, and is a co-flagship of the Ohio State Sports Network. Owned by the Tegna Inc. subsidiary of Nexstar Media Group, WBNS, WBNS-FM and WBNS-TV share studios and offices on Twin Rivers Drive near Downtown Columbus. WBNS's transmitter, a diamond-shaped Blaw-Knox tower, is located in East Columbus.

== History ==
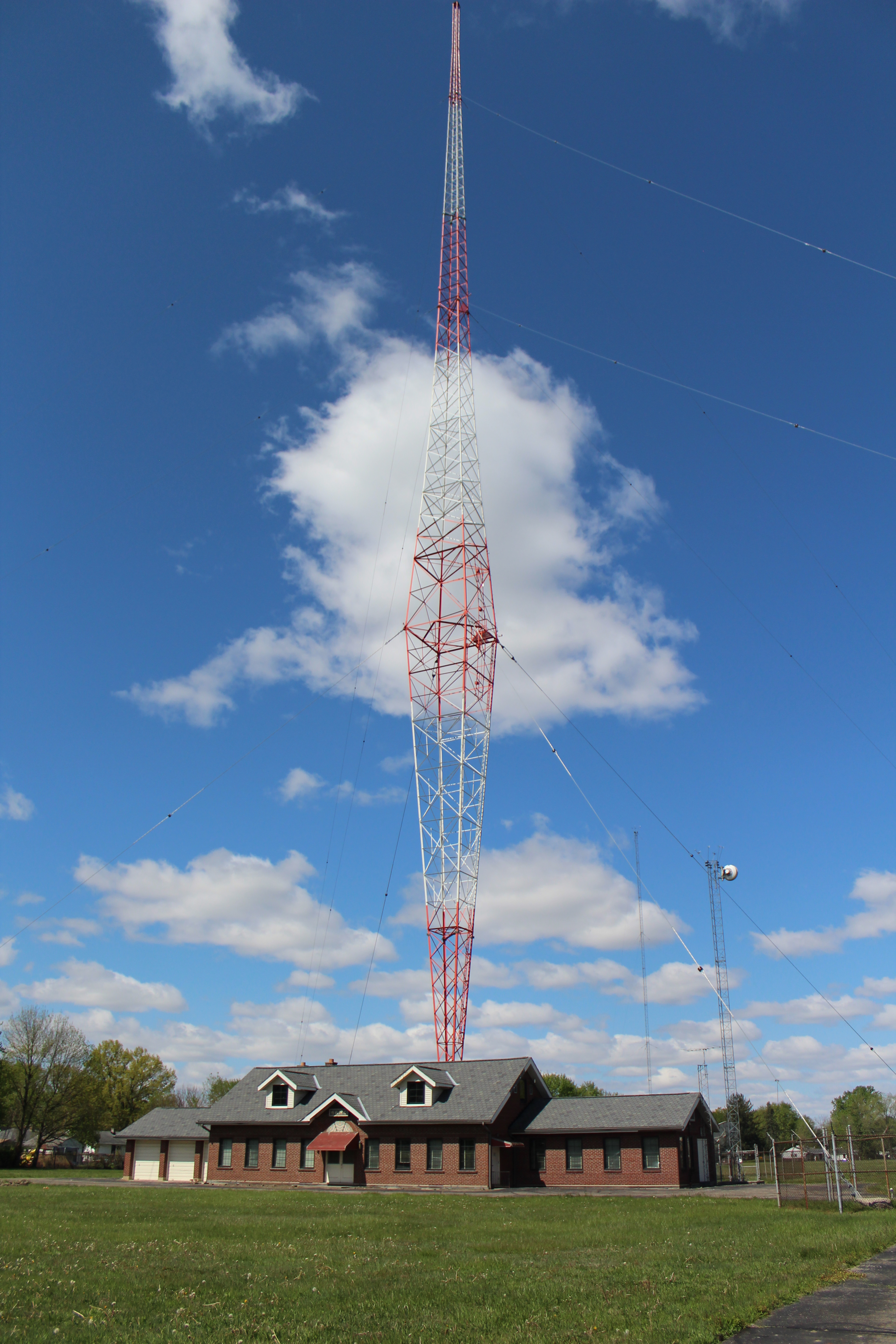
Blaw-Knox diamond tower used by the station

The station was first authorized, as WCAH, on May 13, 1922, and was originally owned by the Entrekin Electric Company of Columbus. The Wolfe family, owners of The Columbus Dispatch, bought the station in 1929 and in January 1934 changed the calls to the present WBNS– the call letters stand for "Wolfe Bank, Newspaper and Shoes"—the businesses controlled by the Wolfe family. (The WBNS stations maintained common ownership with the Dispatch until 2015, when the Wolfes sold the newspaper and related assets to New Media Investment Group.) WBNS was the longtime Columbus affiliate of the CBS Radio Network, and in the present-day serves as the AM flagship of the Ohio State Sports Network.

After various formats over the decades, including full service, Top 40, and MOR, in 2009 WBNS began simulcasting with WBNS-FM, which had previously aired an adult contemporary format. This was intended to improve the nighttime coverage for the station's longtime sports talk format, as well as Buckeyes football and basketball. The AM station must reduce its power to 1,000 watts at night, resulting in reduced coverage outside of Columbus itself. However, the FM station was branded as the main station, under the moniker "97.1 The Fan."

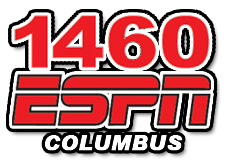
Former logo

In 2011, the simulcast ended. The AM station began offering additional ESPN network programming and announced plans to create original local content such as an MMA show called "Ground & Pound", as well as a coach's show for the local MLS team, the Columbus Crew. On January 5, 2012, it was announced that the station would carry Cleveland Indians broadcasts in Columbus for the 2012 season, marking the return of the Indians after their absence from the Columbus market for the 2011 season. WBNS is one of a few stations remaining in the U.S. to broadcast using a Blaw-Knox tower that employed a distinctive diamond-shaped cantilever design.

On June 11, 2019, Dispatch announced it was selling its broadcasting assets, including the WBNS stations, to Tegna Inc. for $535 million in cash. The sale was completed on August 8.

On August 21, 2025, it was announced that the station will be renamed as "The Fan 2" and will drop ESPN Radio for BetMGM and Westwood One programming on September 2, 2025.

Nexstar Media Group acquired Tegna in a deal announced in August 2025 and completed on March 19, 2026. A temporary restraining order issued one week later by the U.S. District Court for the Eastern District of California, later escalated to a preliminary injunction, has prevented WBNS AM/FM/TV from being integrated into WCMH.

== See also ==
- List of initial AM-band station grants in the United States

== Previous logo ==
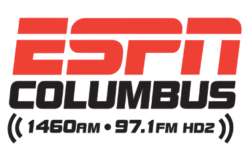
