= List of radio stations in Ohio =

The following is a list of radio stations in the U.S. state of Ohio, which can be sorted by their call signs, frequencies, cities of license, and formats.

== Stations ==
List of radio stations in Ohio
Call sign	Frequency	City of license	Format	Notes
WABQ	1460 AM	Painesville	Gospel music	
WAGX	101.3 FM	Manchester	Classic country	
WAIF	88.3 FM	Cincinnati	Community radio	
WAIS	770 AM	Buchtel	Country	
WAJB-LP	92.5 FM	Wellston	Southern gospel	
WAKR	1590 AM	Akron	Soft adult contemporary/sports	
WAKS	96.5 FM	Akron	Contemporary hits	
WAKT-LP	106.1 FM	Toledo	Variety	
WAKW	93.3 FM	Cincinnati	Christian contemporary	
WAOL	99.5 FM	Ripley	Hot adult contemporary	
WAOM	90.5 FM	Mowrystown	Christian radio (Radio 74 Internationale)	
WAPS	91.3 FM	Akron	Adult album alternative	
WARD	91.9 FM	New Paris	Contemporary worship (Air1)	
WARF	1350 AM	Akron	Sports radio (VSiN)	
WATH	970 AM	Athens	Oldies	
WAUI	88.3 FM	Shelby	Christian radio (AFR)	
WBBG	106.1 FM	Niles	Country	
WBBW	1240 AM	Youngstown	Sports radio (ISN)	
WBCJ	88.1 FM	Spencerville	Christian adult contemporary	(Note: Satellite of WBCL.)
WBCO	1540 AM	Bucyrus	Classic country	
WBCY	89.5 FM	Archbold	Christian adult contemporary	
WBEX	1490 AM	Chillicothe	Talk radio	
WBGU	88.1 FM	Bowling Green	College/free-form (Bowling Green State University)	
WBIE	91.5 FM	Delphos	Christian radio (AFR)	
WBIK	92.1 FM	Pleasant City	Classic rock	
WBJV	88.9 FM	Steubenville	Christian radio (AFR)	
WBKS	93.9 FM	Columbus Grove	Contemporary hits	
WBLL	1390 AM	Bellefontaine	Country	
WBNO-FM	100.9 FM	Bryan	Classic rock	
WBNS	1460 AM	Columbus	Sports radio (ESPN)	
WBNS-FM	97.1 FM	Columbus	Sports radio (ESPN)	
WBNV	93.5 FM	Barnesville	Classic hits	
WBTC	1540 AM	Uhrichsville	Classic hits	
WBUK	106.3 FM	Ottawa	Classic rock	
WBVB	97.1 FM	Coal Grove	Classic hits	
WBVI	96.7 FM	Fostoria	Classic hits	
WBWC	88.3 FM	Berea	College/alternative (Baldwin Wallace University)	
WBWH-LP	96.1 FM	Bluffton	College/variety/smooth jazz (Bluffton College)	
WBZI	1500 AM	Xenia	Classic country	
WCBE	90.5 FM	Columbus	Public radio (NPR)	
WCBV-LP	105.9 FM	Lima	Christian radio	
WCCD	1000 AM	Parma	Gospel music	
WCCR	1260 AM	Cleveland	Catholic (EWTN)	
WCDK	106.3 FM	Cadiz	Classic rock	
WCFI-LP	96.1 FM	Cuyahoga Falls	Variety	
WCHD	99.9 FM	Kettering	Contemporary hits	
WCHI	1350 AM	Chillicothe	Soft adult contemporary	
WCHO	1250 AM	Washington Court House	Oldies	
WCHO-FM	105.5 FM	Washington Court House	Country	
WCIT	940 AM	Lima	Classic country	
WCJO	97.7 FM	Jackson	Country	
WCKX	107.5 FM	Columbus	Urban contemporary	
WCKY	1530 AM	Cincinnati	Sports radio (ESPN)	
WCKY-FM	103.7 FM	Pemberville	Country	
WCLI-FM	101.5 FM	Enon	Classic country	
WCLT	1430 AM	Newark	Adult contemporary	
WCLT-FM	100.3 FM	Newark	Country	
WCLV	90.3 FM	Cleveland	Classical	
WCMJ	96.7 FM	Cambridge	Contemporary hits	
WCMO-LP	97.5 FM	Marietta	College/variety (Marietta College)	
WCOL-FM	92.3 FM	Columbus	Country	
WCPN	104.9 FM	Lorain	Public radio (NPR)	(Note: Satellite of WKSU.)
WCPZ	102.7 FM	Sandusky	Hot adult contemporary	
WCRF-FM	103.3 FM	Cleveland	Christian radio (Moody Radio)	
WCRM-LP	102.1 FM	Columbus	Variety	
WCRS-LP	92.7 FM	Columbus	Variety	
WCSB	89.3 FM	Cleveland	Jazz	
WCSM	1350 AM	Celina	Country	
WCSM-FM	96.7 FM	Celina	Hot adult contemporary	
WCSU-FM	88.9 FM	Wilberforce	College/jazz/urban gospel (Central State University)	
WCUE	1150 AM	Cuyahoga Falls	Christian radio (Family Radio)	
WCVJ	90.9 FM	Jefferson	Contemporary worship (Air1)	
WCVO	104.9 FM	Gahanna	Christian contemporary	
WCVV	89.5 FM	Belpre	Christian radio (BBN)	
WCWA	1230 AM	Toledo	Sports radio (FSR/VSiN)	
WCWT-FM	101.5 FM	Centerville	Campus (Centerville City Schools)	
WCXX-LP	105.5 FM	Cincinnati	Classic rock	
WCYC-LP	105.1 FM	London	Christian radio	
WDAO	1210 AM	Dayton	Urban AC/talk	
WDBZ	1230 AM	Cincinnati	Urban talk/urban contemporary	
WDCM-LP	92.9 FM	Defiance	Variety	
WDEQ-FM	91.7 FM	De Graff	Community radio	
WDFM	98.1 FM	Defiance	Adult contemporary	
WDHT	102.9 FM	Urbana	Rhythmic contemporary	
WDIF-LP	97.5 FM	Marion	Blues	
WDJO	1480 AM	Cincinnati	Oldies	
WDJQ	92.5 FM	Alliance	Contemporary hits	
WDLR	1270 AM	Marysville	Classic hits	
WDLW	1380 AM	Lorain	Classic rock	
WDNP-LP	102.3 FM	Dover	Variety	
WDOG-LP	105.9 FM	New Philadelphia	Rock	
WDOH	107.1 FM	Delphos	Classic hits	
WDOK	102.1 FM	Cleveland	Adult contemporary	
WDPG	89.9 FM	Greenville	Classical	
WDPN	1310 AM	Alliance	Soft adult contemporary	
WDPR	88.1 FM	Dayton	Classical	
WDPS	89.5 FM	Dayton	Campus/jazz (Dayton Public Schools)	
WDTZ-LP	98.1 FM	Delhi Township	Classic hits	
WDWC	90.7 FM	Martins Ferry	Christian radio	
WEBN	102.7 FM	Cincinnati	Active rock	
WEDI	1130 AM	Eaton	Classic country	
WEEC	100.7 FM	Springfield	Christian radio	
WEFC-LP	92.7 FM	Galloway	Ethnic/Russian	
WEGE	104.9 FM	Lima	Classic rock	
WENZ	107.9 FM	Cleveland	Mainstream urban	
WERE	1490 AM	Cleveland Heights	Talk radio	
WERT	1220 AM	Van Wert	Adult standards	
WFCJ	93.7 FM	Miamisburg	Christian radio	
WFCO	90.9 FM	Lancaster	Christian contemporary (WCVO)	
WFGA	106.7 FM	Hicksville	Classic country	
WFGF	92.1 FM	Wapakoneta	Country	
WFGU-LP	88.1 FM	Winchester	Christian radio (3ABN)	
WFIN	1330 AM	Findlay	Talk radio	
WFOB	1430 AM	Fostoria	Sports radio (ESPN)	
WFOT	89.5 FM	Lexington	Catholic (EWTN)	(Note: Satellite of WNOC.)
WFRO-FM	99.1 FM	Fremont	Adult contemporary	
WFTK	96.5 FM	Lebanon	Active rock	
WFUN	970 AM	Ashtabula	Sports radio (ESPN)	
WFXJ-FM	107.5 FM	North Kingsville	Classic rock	
WFXN-FM	102.3 FM	Galion	Mainstream rock	
WGAR-FM	99.5 FM	Cleveland	Country	
WGBE	90.9 FM	Bryan	Public radio/classical (NPR)	(Note: Satellite of WGTE-FM.)
WGDE	91.9 FM	Defiance	Public radio/classical (NPR)	
WGFT	1330 AM	Campbell	Classic hits	
WGGN	97.7 FM	Castalia	Christian contemporary	
WGJM-LP	97.9 FM	Englewood	Urban contemporary gospel	
WGLE	90.7 FM	Lima	Public radio/classical (NPR)	
WGNH	94.9 FM	South Webster	Christian radio	(Note: Satellite of WTHL.)
WGNZ	1110 AM	Fairborn	Southern gospel	
WGOJ	105.5 FM	Conneaut	Christian radio (BBN)	
WGRI	1050 AM	Cincinnati	Christian radio	
WGRN-LP	91.9 FM	Columbus	Variety	
WGRR	103.5 FM	Hamilton	Classic hits	
WGTE-FM	91.3 FM	Toledo	Public radio/classical (NPR)	
WGTZ	92.9 FM	Eaton	Classic hits	
WGUC	90.9 FM	Cincinnati	Public radio/classical (NPR)	
WHBC	1480 AM	Canton	Talk/sports	
WHBC-FM	94.1 FM	Canton	Hot adult contemporary	
WHEI	88.9 FM	Tiffin	Christian contemporary	
WHIO	1290 AM	Dayton	Talk radio	
WHIO-FM	95.7 FM	Pleasant Hill	Talk radio	
WHIZ	1240 AM	Zanesville	Full-service	
WHIZ-FM	92.7 FM	South Zanesville	Hot adult contemporary	
WHJM	88.7 FM	Anna	Catholic (Radio Maria)	(Note: Satellite of KJMJ.)
WHK	1420 AM	Cleveland	Conservative talk	
WHKC	91.5 FM	Columbus	Christian contemporary	
WHKO	99.1 FM	Dayton	Country	
WHKU	91.9 FM	Proctorville	Christian contemporary (K-Love)	
WHKW	1220 AM	Cleveland	Christian radio (SRN)	
WHKZ	1440 AM	Warren	Catholic (Relevant Radio)	
WHLK	106.5 FM	Cleveland	Adult hits	
WHLO	640 AM	Akron	Talk radio	
WHOF	101.7 FM	North Canton	Classic hits	
WHOT-FM	101.1 FM	Youngstown	Contemporary hits	
WHRQ	88.1 FM	Sandusky	Catholic (EWTN)	
WHSS	89.5 FM	Hamilton	Classic rock	
WHTH	790 AM	Heath	Talk radio	
WHVT	90.5 FM	Clyde	Christian radio	
WHVY	89.5 FM	Coshocton	Christian radio	
WHWN	88.3 FM	Painesville	Spanish music	
WILB	1060 AM	Canton	Catholic (EWTN)	
WILB-FM	89.5 FM	Boardman	Catholic (EWTN)	(Note: Satellite of WILB.)
WILE	1270 AM	Cambridge	Country	
WILE-FM	97.7 FM	Byesville	Adult standards	
WIMA	1150 AM	Lima	Talk radio	
WIMT	102.1 FM	Lima	Country	
WIMX	95.7 FM	Gibsonburg	Urban adult contemporary	
WINF-LP	98.5 FM	Delaware	Easy listening	
WING	1410 AM	Dayton	Sports radio (ESPN)	
WINT	1330 AM	Willoughby	Talk radio	
WINW	1520 AM	Canton	Urban contemporary gospel	
WIOI	1010 AM	New Boston	Oldies	
WIOT	104.7 FM	Toledo	Mainstream rock	
WIRO	106.7 FM	Ironton	Adult contemporary	
WITO	1230 AM	Ironton	Classic hits	
WIXZ	950 AM	Steubenville	Urban adult contemporary	
WIZE	1340 AM	Springfield	Black Information Network	
WJAW-FM	100.9 FM	McConnelsville	Country	
WJCU	88.7 FM	University Heights	College/alternative (John Carroll University)	
WJEE	90.1 FM	Bolivar	Christian radio	
WJEH-FM	93.1 FM	Racine	Country	
WJER	1450 AM	Dover-New Philadelphia	Soft adult contemporary	
WJFY-LP	104.1 FM	Newark	Christian radio	
WJIC	91.7 FM	Zanesville	Christian radio (VCY America)	
WJJE	89.1 FM	Delaware	Christian radio (AFR)	
WJKR	103.9 FM	Worthington	Country	
WJKW	95.9 FM	Athens	Christian contemporary	
WJMO	1300 AM	Cleveland	Spanish variety	
WJTA	88.9 FM	Glandorf	Catholic (EWTN)	
WJUC	107.3 FM	Swanton	Mainstream urban	
WJVG-LP	96.7 FM	Columbus	Christian radio	
WJYD	106.3 FM	London	Urban gospel	
WJYM	730 AM	Bowling Green	Gospel music	
WJZE	97.3 FM	Oak Harbor	Mainstream urban	
WKBN	570 AM	Youngstown	Talk radio	
WKCD	90.3 FM	Cedarville	Christian contemporary (K-Love)	
WKCO	91.9 FM	Gambier	College/free-form (Kenyon College)	
WKDD	98.1 FM	Munroe Falls	Hot adult contemporary	
WKEN	88.5 FM	Kenton	Christian contemporary	
WKET	98.3 FM	Kettering	Campus/AOR (Fairmont High School)	
WKFI	1090 AM	Wilmington	Classic country	
WKFM	96.1 FM	Huron	Country	
WKFS	107.1 FM	Milford	Hot adult contemporary	
WKHR	91.5 FM	Bainbridge	Adult standards	
WKJA	91.9 FM	Brunswick	Christian radio	
WKKI	94.3 FM	Celina	Classic hits	
WKKJ	94.3 FM	Chillicothe	Country	
WKKO	99.9 FM	Toledo	Country	
WKKY	104.7 FM	Geneva	Country	
WKLM	95.3 FM	Millersburg	Adult contemporary	
WKLN	102.3 FM	Wilmington	Christian contemporary (K-Love)	
WKLV-FM	95.5 FM	Cleveland	Christian contemporary (K-Love)	
WKNA	98.3 FM	Logan	Classic hits	
WKNR	850 AM	Cleveland	Sports radio (ESPN)	
WKOV-FM	96.7 FM	Wellston	Adult contemporary	
WKRC	550 AM	Cincinnati	Talk radio	
WKRJ	91.5 FM	New Philadelphia	Public radio (NPR)	
WKRK-FM	92.3 FM	Cleveland Heights	Sports radio (ISN)	
WKRP-FM	97.7 FM	Mason	Oldies	
WKRQ	101.9 FM	Cincinnati	Contemporary hits	
WKRW	89.3 FM	Wooster	Public radio (NPR)	
WKSD	99.7 FM	Paulding	Classic hits	
WKSU	89.7 FM	Kent	Public radio (NPR)	
WKSV	89.1 FM	Thompson	Public radio (NPR)	
WKTL	90.7 FM	Struthers	Adult album alternative	(Note: Satellite of WAPS-FM.)
WKTN	95.3 FM	Kenton	Hot adult contemporary	
WKTX	830 AM	Cortland	Urban gospel	
WKVR	102.5 FM	Baltimore	Christian contemporary (K-Love)	
WKVX	960 AM	Wooster	Southern gospel	
WKWO	90.9 FM	Wooster	Christian contemporary (K-Love)	
WKXA-FM	100.5 FM	Findlay	Country	
WLCI-LP	97.5 FM	Nelsonville	Rock	
WLEC	1450 AM	Sandusky	Oldies	
WLFC	88.3 FM	North Baltimore	College/indie rock (University of Findlay)	
WLGN	1510 AM	Logan	Classic hits	
WLHS	89.9 FM	West Chester	Old Time Radio/Big band	
WLKP	91.9 FM	Belpre	Christian contemporary (K-Love)	
WLKR	1510 AM	Norwalk	Classic hits	
WLKR-FM	95.3 FM	Norwalk	Adult album alternative/sports	
WLOH	1320 AM	Lancaster	Country	
WLRD	96.9 FM	Willard	Southern gospel	
WLRU-LP	106.9 FM	Hillsboro	Catholic	
WLRY	88.9 FM	Rushville	Christian radio	
WLTP	910 AM	Marietta	Talk radio	
WLVQ	96.3 FM	Columbus	Classic rock	
WLW	700 AM	Cincinnati	Talk/sports	
WLYV	1290 AM	Bellaire	Talk/sports	
WLZZ	104.5 FM	Montpelier	Country	
WMAN	1400 AM	Mansfield	Talk radio	
WMAN-FM	98.3 FM	Fredericktown	Talk radio	
WMCO	90.7 FM	New Concord	College/alternative (Muskingum University)	
WMIH	89.5 FM	Geneva	Catholic (EWTN)	
WMJI	105.7 FM	Cleveland	Classic hits	
WMJK	100.9 FM	Clyde	Country	
WMKV	89.3 FM	Reading	Adult standards	
WMLX	103.3 FM	St. Marys	Adult contemporary	
WMMS	100.7 FM	Cleveland	Active rock/hot talk	
WMMX	107.7 FM	Dayton	Hot adult contemporary	
WMNI	920 AM	Columbus	Sports radio (FSR)	
WMOA	1490 AM	Marietta	Adult contemporary	
WMOH	1450 AM	Hamilton	Conservative talk	
WMPO	1390 AM	Middleport-Pomeroy	Sports radio (FSR)	
WMRN	1490 AM	Marion	Talk radio	
WMRN-FM	94.3 FM	Marion	Country	
WMRT	88.3 FM	Marietta	Classical	
WMTR-FM	96.1 FM	Archbold	Classic hits	
WMUB	88.5 FM	Oxford	Public radio (NPR)	
WMVR-FM	105.5 FM	Sidney	Hot adult contemporary	
WMWX	88.9 FM	Miamitown	Classic rock	
WMXY	98.9 FM	Youngstown	Adult contemporary	
WMYW-LP	102.7 FM	Paulding	Variety	
WNCD	93.3 FM	Youngstown	Mainstream rock	
WNCI	97.9 FM	Columbus	Contemporary hits	
WNCO	1340 AM	Ashland	Sports radio (FSR)	
WNCO-FM	101.3 FM	Ashland	Country	
WNCR	930 AM	Elyria	Catholic (EWTN)	(Note: Simulcast of WCCR.)
WNCX	98.5 FM	Cleveland	Classic rock	
WNDH	103.1 FM	Napoleon	Classic hits	
WNHC-LP	104.1 FM	Lima	Christian radio	
WNIO	1390 AM	Youngstown	Sports radio (FSR/VSiN)	
WNIR	100.1 FM	Kent	Talk radio	
WNKL	96.9 FM	Wauseon	Christian contemporary (K-Love)	
WNKN	105.9 FM	Middletown	Catholic (Relevant Radio)	
WNKO	101.7 FM	Newark	Classic hits	
WNLB-LP	97.7 FM	Holland	Oldies	
WNLT	104.3 FM	Harrison	Christian contemporary (K-Love)	
WNND	103.5 FM	Pickerington	Classic hits	
WNNF	94.1 FM	Cincinnati	Country	
WNNP	104.3 FM	Richwood	Classic hits	
WNOC	89.7 FM	Bowling Green	Catholic (EWTN)	
WNPA-LP	102.5 FM	Canton	Variety	
WNPQ	95.9 FM	New Philadelphia	Christian contemporary (K-Love)	
WNRK	90.7 FM	Norwalk	Public radio (NPR)	
WNUS	107.1 FM	Belpre	Country	
WNWV	107.3 FM	Elyria	Alternative rock	
WNXT	1260 AM	Portsmouth	Sports radio (FSR)	
WNXT-FM	99.3 FM	Portsmouth	Hot adult contemporary	
WNZN	89.1 FM	Lorain	Spanish music	
WNZR	90.9 FM	Mount Vernon	Christian contemporary	
WOAR	88.3 FM	South Vienna	Contemporary worship (Air1)	
WOBC-FM	91.5 FM	Oberlin	College/free-form (Oberlin College)	
WOBL	1320 AM	Oberlin	Classic country	
WOBN	97.5 FM	Westerville	College/free-form (Otterbein University)	
WOBO	88.7 FM	Batavia	Variety	
WODC	93.3 FM	Ashville	Classic hits	
WOFN	88.7 FM	Beach City	Christian radio	(Note: Satellite of KNYD.)
WOFX-FM	92.5 FM	Cincinnati	Classic rock	
WOHA	94.9 FM	Ada	Catholic (EWTN)	
WOHC	90.1 FM	Chillicothe	Contemporary worship (Air1)	
WOHF	92.1 FM	Bellevue	Classic hits	
WOHI	1490 AM	East Liverpool	Classic hits	
WOHK	96.1 FM	Ashtabula	Christian contemporary (K-Love)	
WOHP-LP	101.3 FM	Huntsville	Oldies	
WOMP	100.5 FM	Bellaire	Classic hits	
WOMP-LP	101.9 FM	Cambridge	Oldies/Adult standards	
WONE	980 AM	Dayton	Sports radio (FSR)	
WONE-FM	97.5 FM	Akron	Classic rock	
WONW	1280 AM	Defiance	Talk radio	
WOOO-LP	95.5 FM	Defiance	Variety	
WORI	90.1 FM	Delhi Hills	Contemporary worship (Air1)	
WOSA	101.1 FM	Grove City	Classical	
WOSB	91.1 FM	Marion	Public radio/classical (NPR)	(Note: Satellite of WOSX.)
WOSE	91.1 FM	Coshocton	Public radio/classical (NPR)	
WOSL	100.3 FM	Norwood	Urban adult contemporary	
WOSP	91.5 FM	Portsmouth	Public radio/classical (NPR)	
WOSU-FM	89.7 FM	Columbus	Public radio (NPR)	
WOSV	91.7 FM	Mansfield	Public radio/classical (NPR)	
WOSX	91.1 FM	Granville	Public radio/classical (NPR)	
WOTL	90.3 FM	Toledo	Christian radio (Family Radio)	
WOUB	1340 AM	Athens	Public radio/community (NPR)	
WOUB-FM	91.3 FM	Athens	Public radio (NPR)	
WOUC-FM	89.1 FM	Cambridge	Public radio (NPR)	(Note: Satellite of WOUB-FM.)
WOUH-FM	91.9 FM	Chillicothe	Public radio (NPR)	
WOUL-FM	89.1 FM	Ironton	Public radio (NPR)	
WOUZ-FM	90.1 FM	Zanesville	Public radio (NPR)	
WOVU-LP	95.9 FM	Cleveland	Variety	
WOXY	94.5 FM	Englewood	Oldies	
WPAY	1520 AM	Rossford	Catholic (Relevant Radio)	
WPFB	910 AM	Middletown	Catholic (EWTN)	
WPFX-FM	107.7 FM	Luckey	Country	
WPKO-FM	98.3 FM	Bellefontaine	Hot adult contemporary	
WPLC-LP	95.1 FM	Piqua	Christian radio (3ABN)	
WPOS-FM	102.3 FM	Holland	Christian radio	
WPTW	1570 AM	Piqua	Classic hits	
WPYK	104.1 FM	New Boston	Christian contemporary (K-Love)	
WQAL	104.1 FM	Cleveland	Hot adult contemporary	
WQCD	1550 AM	Delaware	Classic rock	
WQCT	1520 AM	Bryan	Classic hits	
WQEL	92.7 FM	Bucyrus	Classic rock	
WQGR	93.7 FM	North Madison	Oldies	
WQIO	93.7 FM	Mount Vernon	Adult contemporary	
WQKT	104.5 FM	Wooster	Christian contemporary (WCVO)	
WQLX	106.5 FM	Chillicothe	Hot adult contemporary	
WQMX	94.9 FM	Medina	Country	
WQOU-LP	104.1 FM	Mt. Gilead	Catholic	
WQQO	105.5 FM	Sylvania	Contemporary hits	
WQRP	89.5 FM	Dayton	Christian contemporary	
WQXK	105.1 FM	Salem	Country	
WRAC	103.1 FM	Georgetown	Country	
WRDL	88.9 FM	Ashland	College/alternative (Ashland University)	
WREO-FM	97.1 FM	Ashtabula	Soft adult contemporary	
WREW	94.9 FM	Fairfield	Adult contemporary	
WRFD	880 AM	Columbus	Christian radio (SRN)	
WRGM	1440 AM	Ontario	Sports radio (ESPN)	
WRKD-LP	101.3 FM	Rockford	Adult hits	
WRKZ	99.7 FM	Columbus	Active rock	
WRMU-FM	91.1 FM	Alliance	College/alternative (University of Mount Union)	
WROU-FM	92.1 FM	West Carrollton	Urban adult contemporary	
WRPO-LP	93.5 FM	Russells Point	Oldies	
WRQK-FM	106.9 FM	Canton	Mainstream rock	
WRQN	93.5 FM	Bowling Green	Classic hits	
WRQX	600 AM	Salem	Conservative talk	
WRRM	98.5 FM	Cincinnati	Adult contemporary	
WRRO	89.9 FM	Edon	Catholic (EWTN)	
WRUW-FM	91.1 FM	Cleveland	College/free-form (Case Western Reserve University)	
WRVB	102.1 FM	Marietta	Contemporary hits	
WRVF	101.5 FM	Toledo	Adult contemporary	
WSAI	1360 AM	Cincinnati	Sports radio (FSR)	
WSAV-LP	93.7 FM	Lorain	Christian radio	
WSAX-LP	98.5 FM	Columbus	Smooth jazz	
WSEO	107.7 FM	Nelsonville	Country	
WSGR	88.3 FM	New Boston	Christian contemporary	
WSHB	90.9 FM	Willard	Catholic (EWTN)	
WSIB-LP	106.7 FM	Athens	Religious	
WSJG-LP	103.3 FM	Tiffin	Catholic	
WSNY	94.7 FM	Columbus	Adult contemporary	
WSOH	88.9 FM	Zanesfield	Christian contemporary	
WSPD	1370 AM	Toledo	Talk radio	
WSRW	1590 AM	Hillsboro	Classic hits	
WSTB	88.9 FM	Streetsboro	Campus/alternative/oldies (Streetsboro High School)	
WSWO-LP	97.3 FM	Huber Heights	Oldies	
WSWR	100.1 FM	Shelby	Classic hits	
WTAM	1100 AM	Cleveland	Talk/sports	
WTGN	97.7 FM	Lima	Christian radio	
WTGR	97.5 FM	Union City	Country	
WTIG	990 AM	Massillon	Sports radio (ESPN)	
WTJN-LP	107.1 FM	Troy	Variety	
WTKC	89.7 FM	Findlay	Christian radio	
WTKD	106.5 FM	Greenville	Christian radio	
WTNS	1560 AM	Coshocton	Country	
WTNS-FM	99.3 FM	Coshocton	Adult contemporary	
WTOD	106.5 FM	Delta	Christian radio	
WTOH	98.9 FM	Upper Arlington	Conservative talk	
WTPG	88.9 FM	Whitehouse	Christian adult contemporary	
WTPS-LP	94.1 FM	Napoleon	Christian contemporary	
WTTF	1600 AM	Tiffin	Oldies	
WTTP-LP	101.1 FM	Lima	Christian radio	
WTUE	104.7 FM	Dayton	Classic rock	
WTUZ	99.9 FM	Uhrichsville	Country	
WTVN	610 AM	Columbus	Talk radio	
WUBE-FM	105.1 FM	Cincinnati	Country	
WUDR	98.1 FM	Dayton	College/free-form (University of Dayton)	
WUFM	88.7 FM	Columbus	Christian rock	
WUHS-LP	96.9 FM	West Union	Campus (West Union High School)	
WULM	1600 AM	Springfield	Catholic (Radio Maria)	
WUSO	89.1 FM	Springfield	Classical	
WVKF	95.7 FM	Shadyside	Contemporary hits	
WVKS	92.5 FM	Toledo	Contemporary hits	
WVLO	99.3 FM	Cridersville	Christian contemporary (K-Love)	
WVMC-FM	90.7 FM	Mansfield	Christian contemporary	
WVML	90.5 FM	Millersburg	Christian radio (Moody Radio)	(Note: Satellite of WCRF-FM.)
WVMS	89.5 FM	Sandusky	Christian radio (Moody Radio)	
WVMU	91.7 FM	Ashtabula	Christian radio (Moody Radio)	
WVMX	107.9 FM	Westerville	Adult Top 40	
WVNO-FM	106.1 FM	Mansfield	Adult contemporary	
WVNU	97.5 FM	Greenfield	Classic rock	
WVQC-LP	95.7 FM	Cincinnati	Variety	
WVSG	820 AM	Columbus	Catholic	
WVXG	95.1 FM	Mount Gilead	Classic rock	
WVXU	91.7 FM	Cincinnati	Public radio (NPR)	
WVZC-LP	96.5 FM	Toledo	Variety	
WWBJ-LP	92.1 FM	Hillsboro	Christian radio	
WWGL-LP	97.9 FM	Steubenville	Christian radio	
WWGV	88.1 FM	Grove City	Christian radio (AFR)	
WWJM	105.9 FM	New Lexington	Hot adult contemporary	
WWKC	104.9 FM	Caldwell	Country	
WWLA	103.1 FM	Johnstown	Spanish AC/Regional Mexican	
WWLG	107.1 FM	Circleville	Spanish AC/Regional Mexican	
WWOC-LP	97.7 FM	Bowling Green	Christian radio (3ABN)	
WWOH-LP	104.5 FM	Marietta	Christian radio (3ABN)	
WWOV-LP	101.1 FM	Martins Ferry	Country	
WWOW	1360 AM	Conneaut	Oldies	
WWSR	93.1 FM	Lima	Sports radio (ESPN)	
WWSU	106.9 FM	Fairborn	College/free-form (Wright State University)	
WWTL-LP	106.3 FM	Logan	Southern gospel	
WWWR-LP	97.1 FM	Wadsworth	Variety	
WWYC	1560 AM	Toledo	Christian radio (CSN International)	
WXBW	101.5 FM	Gallipolis	Country	
WXGT	1580 AM	Columbus	Classic rock	
WXIC	660 AM	Waverly	Sports radio (FSR)	
WXIZ	100.9 FM	Waverly	Classic country	
WXKR	94.5 FM	Port Clinton	Classic rock	
WXMF	91.9 FM	Marion	Christian radio	
WXMG	95.5 FM	Lancaster	Urban adult contemporary	
WXML	90.1 FM	Upper Sandusky	Christian radio	
WXMW	89.3 FM	Sycamore	Christian radio	
WXTQ	105.5 FM	Athens	Classic rock	
WXTS-FM	88.3 FM	Toledo	Campus/jazz (Toledo Public Schools)	(Note: Operating under a "Shared Time" agreement on the same frequency.)
WXUT	88.3 FM	Toledo	College/alternative (University of Toledo)	
WXXF	107.7 FM	Loudonville	Soft adult contemporary	
WXZQ	100.1 FM	Piketon	Classic hits	
WXZX	105.7 FM	Hilliard	Alternative rock	
WYBL	98.3 FM	Ashtabula	Country	
WYBZ	107.3 FM	Crooksville	Classic hits	
WYDA	96.9 FM	Troy	Contemporary worship (Air1)	
WYFY	88.1 FM	Cambridge	Christian radio (BBN)	
WYHT	105.3 FM	Mansfield	Hot adult contemporary	
WYKL	98.7 FM	Crestline	Christian contemporary (K-Love)	
WYLR	101.9 FM	Hubbard	Christian contemporary (K-Love)	
WYNS	89.1 FM	Waynesville	Classic rock	
WYNT	95.9 FM	Caledonia	Hot adult contemporary	
WYOH	1540 AM	Niles	Talk radio	
WYOR	88.5 FM	Republic	Christian contemporary	
WYPC	1330 AM	Wellston	Sports radio (FSR)	
WYRO	98.7 FM	McArthur	Classic rock	
WYSA	88.5 FM	Wauseon	Christian contemporary	
WYSM	89.3 FM	Lima	Christian contemporary	
WYSO	91.3 FM	Yellow Springs	Public radio (NPR)	
WYSU	88.5 FM	Youngstown	Public radio (NPR)	
WYSZ	89.3 FM	Maumee	Christian contemporary	
WYTN	91.7 FM	Youngstown	Christian radio (Family Radio)	
WYTS	1230 AM	Columbus	Black Information Network	
WYVK	92.1 FM	Middleport	Adult contemporary	
WYWH-LP	104.5 FM	Athens	Christian radio (3ABN)	
WYWO	1570 AM	Warren	Talk radio	
WZAA-LP	106.9 FM	Jeffersonville	Variety	
WZAK	93.1 FM	Cleveland	Urban AC/talk	
WZCB	106.7 FM	Dublin	Urban contemporary	
WZCP	89.3 FM	Chillicothe	Christian contemporary (WCVO)	
WZDA	103.9 FM	Beavercreek	Country	
WZIP	88.1 FM	Akron	College/contemporary hits (University of Akron)	
WZLP-LP	95.7 FM	Loudonville	Christian radio	
WZLR	95.3 FM	Xenia	Classic hits	
WZMO-LP	107.1 FM	Marion	Variety	
WZNP	89.3 FM	Newark	Christian contemporary (WCVO)	
WZOM	105.7 FM	Defiance	Country	
WZOO-FM	102.5 FM	Edgewood	Oldies	
WZRX-FM	107.5 FM	Fort Shawnee	Oldies	
WZVL	103.7 FM	Philo	Country	
WZWP	89.5 FM	West Union	Christian radio	
WZZZ	107.5 FM	Portsmouth	Classic rock	

== Defunct ==
- KDPM Cleveland (1921–1927)
- W45CM/WELD Columbus (1941–1953)
- WAQI/WAST Ashtabula (1964–1982)
- WBKC/WCDN/WATJ Chardon (1969–2004)
- WBBY-FM Westerville (1969–1990)
- WBOE Cleveland (1938–1978)
- WAND/WCNS/WNYN/WTOF/WBXT/WCER Canton (1947–2011)
- WCLW Mansfield (1957–1987)
- WCNW Fairfield (1964–2024)
- WCRX-LP Columbus (2007–2020)
- WDBK/WFJC Cleveland; moved to Akron in 1927 (1924–1930)
- WFRO Fremont (1950–2021)
- WJDD Carrollton (surrendered in 2022)
- WJEH/WGTR/WJEH Gallipolis (1950–2021)
- WJTB North Ridgeville (1984–2017)
- WKNT/WJMP Kent (1965–2016)
- WJVS Cincinnati (surrendered in 2012)
- WKJH-LP Bryan (cancelled in 2023)
- WLBJ-LP Fostoria (2015–2020)
- WLMH Morrow (cancelled in 2012)
- WLQR Toledo (1954–2016)
- WMH Cincinnati (1921–1923)
- WMVO Mount Vernon (1953–2023)
- WNSD Cincinnati (1972–1978)
- WHBD/WPAY Bellefontaine; moved to Mt. Orab in 1929 and Portsmouth in 1935 (1925–2011)
- WWGH-LP
- WWGK Cleveland (1947–2021)
- WWIZ Lorain (1958–1967)
