= WAST =

WAST or Wast may refer to:

== People ==
- Hugo Wast – Argentine novelist and script writer
- Joan Wast – English blind woman who was burned in Derby for refusing to renounce her Protestant faith
- Zano Wast – American basketball player

== Places and Geography ==
- Al-Wast, Al-Bayda
- Le Wast
- Wast (Amran)
- Wast Hill Tunnel – Canal tunnel in Birmingham, England
- Wast Water, a lake in Cumbria, England

== Organisations ==
- Deutsche Dienststelle (WASt) – German military archive agency (1939–2019)
- WAST (Ohio), a defunct daytime-only radio station licensed to Ashtabula, Ohio, US
- WAST-LP (Wisconsin), a defunct low-power television station in Ashland, Wisconsin, US
- WNYT (TV), formerly WAST, a television station licensed to Albany, New York, US
- Wast Hills Observatory – Astronomical observatory in England, part of the University of Birmingham

== Other ==
- wast, a past-tense form of to be formerly used with the pronoun thou

== See also ==
- AWST (disambiguation)
- WST (disambiguation)
