= WNXT =

WNXT can refer to:

- WNXT (AM), a radio station (1260 AM) licensed to Portsmouth, Ohio, United States
- WNXT-FM, a radio station (99.3 FM) licensed to Portsmouth, Ohio, United States
