= WKVX =

Radio station in Wooster, Ohio

- Wooster, Ohio; United States
- Broadcast area: Wooster, Ohio
- Frequency: 960 kHz
- Branding: Glory Radio

Programming
- Format: Southern gospel
- Affiliations: Ohio State Sports Network; Townhall News

Ownership
- Owner: River Radio Ministries
- Sister stations: WQKT, WZCP, WZNP, WCVO, WFCO

History
- First air date: September 17, 1947; 78 years ago (as WWST)
- Former call signs: WWST (1947–1988)

Technical information
- Licensing authority: FCC
- Facility ID: 74202
- Class: D
- Power: 1,000 watts (day); 32 watts (night)
- Transmitter coordinates: 40°47′31″N 81°54′17″W
- Translator: 102.9 W274AN (Jefferson)
- Repeater: 104.5 WQKT-HD2 (Wooster)

Links
- Public license information: Public file; LMS
- Webcast: Listen Live
- Website: glory.radio

WKVX (960 AM) is a radio station in Wooster, Ohio, United States, with a southern gospel format. it is co-owned with FM station WQKT.

== History ==
The station began broadcasting on September 17, 1947 as WWST, originally broadcasting daytime only. It changed to WKVX on September 1, 1988.

On August 2, 2024, WKVX changed their format from classic hits to southern gospel, branded as "Glory Radio".

== Previous logos ==
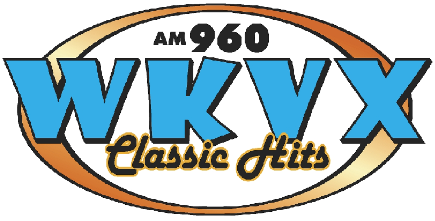
(WKVX's logo under previous "Oldies 960" branding)
