= WGGN =

WGGN may refer to:

- WGGN-TV, a television station (channel 3, virtual 52) licensed to serve Sandusky, Ohio, United States
- WGGN (FM), a radio station (97.7 FM) licensed to serve Castalia, Ohio
