= WBUK =

- Ottawa, Ohio; United States
- Broadcast area: Findlay, Ohio
- Frequency: 106.3 MHz
- Branding: 106.3 The Fox

Programming
- Language: English
- Format: Classic rock

Ownership
- Owner: Findlay Publishing Company; (Blanchard River Broadcasting Co.)
- Sister stations: WFIN, WKXA-FM

History
- First air date: February 4, 1977
- Former call signs: WPNM (1977–1986); WQTL (1986–2002)
- Call sign meaning: former "Big Buck" branding

Technical information
- Licensing authority: FCC
- Facility ID: 40172
- Class: A
- ERP: 1,400 watts
- HAAT: 149 meters (489 ft)
- Transmitter coordinates: 40°57′21.00″N 83°54′42.00″W

Links
- Public license information: Public file; LMS
- Webcast: Listen live
- Website: 1063thefox.com

WBUK (106.3 FM) – branded 106.3 The Fox – is a commercial classic rock radio station licensed to Ottawa, Ohio. Owned by the Findlay Publishing Company through licensee Blanchard River Broadcasting, the station serves the Northwest Ohio counties of Putnam, Hancock, and Allen. The WBUK studios are located in the city of Findlay, while the station transmitter resides near the village of Pandora.

== History ==
The 106.3 frequency originally was home to WPNM (with the calls standing for Putnam, the station's county of license) and was founded on February 4, 1977 by Bellefontaine-based Triplett Broadcasting which owned the former WTOO AM & FM (now WBLL(AM) and WPKO-FM respectively) and WYNT when it was still in Upper Sandusky. Financial difficulties forced Triplett to sell its properties in the 1980s. WPNM's studios were originally located in its city of license, Ottawa, which at first tried a contemporary hit format, then for many years employed a jazz format until 1986 when it became WQTL. The WBUK calls and format moved to 106.3 in 2002.

WBUK launched in 1991 under the ownership of the late Charles Hutchinson's CHH Corporation, and under the direction of Jake Phillips as General Manager and Michael Waite as program director. Phillips was also the General Manager that launched 92Zoo in the same market in the mid 80's. WBUK "The Big Buck" originally broadcast from 1991 to 2002 at 107.5 in the city of license of Ft. Shawnee with studios located on South Metcalf Street near the Ottawa River. It became part of the Lima cluster of Clear Channel Communications in the late 1990s. The 107.5 frequency is now occupied by active rock WZRX-FM.

Over the years, The Big Buck played home to many well known Lima radio personalities. The Breakfast Bunch with Steve McCoy and Todd Walker, Michael Waite(Now OM of WJBR Wilmington, Delaware), Adam Wright, Mike Edwards, Phil Austin, Renee Scott, Betsy Winget, Dave (Mark) Ryan, Spark Simon, "The Roger Ride" Roger Foreman, Eric Hansen, Cori Paige, Jim Edwards, Tony Day, Bobby Cole, and many others.

== Current programming ==
Until 106.3 became the new home of "The Fox", long time Lima area broadcast veteran Spark Simon was the morning personality on "The Big Buck"; the rest of the on-air broadcasts was provided by Jones Radio Networks' Good Time Oldies format. Renee Scott was previously an air personality.

As part of a divestiture among Clear Channel's small-market radio stations, WBUK was initially sold to Florida-based GoodRadio.TV LLC in May 2007, but the deal soon collapsed prior to FCC approval. In September 2008, Clear Channel Communications sold WBUK to the Blanchard River Broadcasting subsidiary of Findlay Publishing Company, which owns and operates WFIN AM and WKXA-FM. Blanchard's purchase of WBUK has since earned FCC approval.

As WBUK's format is a competitor to the classic hits format of WKXA, WKXA has since changed to a country format.
