= WJEH =

WJEH may refer to:

- WJEH (AM), a defunct radio station (990 AM) formerly licensed to serve Gallipolis, Ohio, United States
- WJEH-FM, a radio station (93.1 FM) licensed to serve Racine, Ohio
