= WLLA =

Television station in Kalamazoo, Michigan

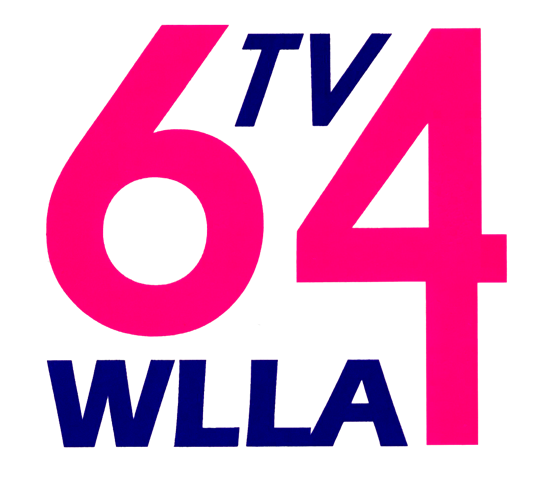
- Kalamazoo–Battle Creek–; Grand Rapids, Michigan; United States
- City: Kalamazoo, Michigan
- Channels: Digital: 22 (UHF); Virtual: 64
- Branding: WLLA 64

Programming
- Affiliations: 64.1: Religious Independent; for others, see § Subchannels

Ownership
- Owner: Christian Broadcasting Ministries; (Christian Faith Broadcast, Inc.)
- Sister stations: WGGN-TV

History
- First air date: June 30, 1987
- Former channel numbers: Analog: 64 (UHF, 1987–2008); Digital: 45 (UHF, until 2020)

Technical information
- Licensing authority: FCC
- Facility ID: 11033
- ERP: 350 kW
- HAAT: 330.8 m (1,085 ft)
- Transmitter coordinates: 42°33′52.1″N 85°27′31″W

Links
- Public license information: Public file; LMS
- Website: wlla.tv

WLLA (channel 64) is a religious independent television station licensed to Kalamazoo, Michigan, United States, serving West Michigan. Owned by Christian Faith Broadcast, Inc., it is a sister station to WGGN-TV in Sandusky, Ohio. WLLA's studios are located on East N Avenue in Kalamazoo, and its transmitter is located near Stewart Lake in Orangeville Township.

== History ==
The station signed on the air on June 30, 1987. In 2007, the station entered a revenue-sharing agreement with long-distance telephone carrier Accxx Communications.

== Technical information ==
=== Subchannels ===
The station's signal is multiplexed:

Subchannels of WLLA
Subchannel	Res.	Short name	Programming
64.1	1080i	WLLADTV	Main WLLA programming
64.2	480i	MeTV	MeTV
64.3	480i	HI	Heroes & Icons
64.4	480i	CATCHYC	Catchy Comedy
64.5	480i	WLLAD5	[Blank]
64.6	480i	WLLAD6	Infomercials
64.7	480i	MeTOONS	MeTV Toons

The station began carrying programming from MeTV on digital subchannel 64.2 on July 4, 2013.

=== Analog-to-digital conversion ===
WLLA shut down its analog signal, over UHF channel 64, on November 1, 2008. The station's digital signal remained on its pre-transition UHF channel 45, using virtual channel 64.
