= WYLI =

WYLI may refer to:

- WYLI-LP, a defunct radio station (93.7 FM) licensed to Lake Wylie, South Carolina
- WLTP (AM), a radio station (910 AM) known as WYLI from 1995 to 2001
