= WMVR (AM) =

Radio station in Sidney, Ohio (1963–2000)

Sidney, Ohio; United States
- Frequency: 1080 kHz

Ownership
- Owner: Dean Miller Broadcasting Corp.

History
- First air date: November 21, 1963
- Last air date: 2000
- Call sign meaning: "Miami Valley Radio"

Technical information
- Facility ID: 15999
- Power: 250 watts (daytime only)
- Transmitter coordinates: 40°18′4″N 84°12′21″W

WMVR was a radio station broadcasting at 1080 AM in Sidney, Ohio, United States. It operated from 1963 to 2001.

== History ==
WMVR began broadcasting November 21, 1963. It was owned and operated by the Van Wert Broadcasting Corporation, owners of station WERT in Van Wert. Prior to WMVR's establishment, the only other two radio stations serving the upper Miami Valley were WPTW in Piqua, which to that point had operated an auxiliary studio in the Ohio Building, and WOHP at Bellefontaine. The original studios and offices were located on the second floor of the Taylor Building at the corner of Main Avenue and Poplar Street in downtown Sidney, while its transmitter and three towers were erected near the intersection of Russell and Kuther roads.

An FM sister station, WMVR-FM 105.5, was launched in 1965. Both stations were sold to the Dean Miller Broadcasting Corporation in 1966 for $125,000. Three years later, the studios were moved to the transmitter site on Russell Road. At that time, the formerly simulcasting stations split, with the AM frequency offering a full-service middle of the road format, evolving to adult contemporary in 1972. WMVR was a charter affiliate that year of the Agri Broadcast Network, founded by the late Ed Johnson.

After the 1980s, the station primarily simulcast the FM and its hot adult contemporary format, though attempts were made to program WMVR AM separately, first with a big band nostalgia format (in 1983–1984) and later as news/talk in the mid-1990s. The AM was closed after one of its three towers, used to produce the directional pattern that projected WIBC (1070 AM) in Indianapolis, was toppled in a storm in 2000, with the FM remaining in operation.
