= WQKT =

Radio station in Wooster, Ohio

- Wooster, Ohio; United States
- Broadcast area: Canton and Akron
- Frequency: 104.5 MHz (HD Radio)
- Branding: The River

Programming
- Format: Christian adult contemporary
- Subchannels: HD2: Christian hip hop; HD3: Southern gospel (WKVX)

Ownership
- Owner: River Radio Ministries
- Sister stations: WKVX, WZCP, WZNP, WCVO, WFCO

History
- First air date: 1947
- Former call signs: WWST-FM (1947–1983)

Technical information
- Facility ID: 74201
- Class: B
- ERP: 52,000 watts
- HAAT: 101 meters (331 ft)
- Transmitter coordinates: 40.792°N 81.905°W

Links
- Webcast: Listen live
- Website: wqkt.com

WQKT (104.5 FM) is a commercial radio station licensed to Wooster, Ohio, United States, serving Canton and Akron, with a Christian adult contemporary format. The station carries football and basketball games of The College of Wooster, along with local high school sports broadcasts. WQKT is co-owned with WKVX 960 AM, which airs a southern gospel format.

WQKT's transmitter and studios are sited on South Hillcrest Drive at Lincoln Way East in Wooster.

== History ==
logo as a country station

The station signed on the air in 1947. Its original call sign was WWST-FM. For its first several decades, it simulcast its AM sister station WWST (now WKVX 960 AM). WWST-FM was powered at 5,000 watts, a fraction of its current output. The two stations had a full service format of middle of the road music (MOR), news and sports. In 1962, as Top 40 stations became popular, WWST-AM-FM followed suit.

In the 1980s, WWST-FM flipped to country music, which it continued to air for four decades. The call letters changed to WQKT on October 10, 1983. The station used the syndicated Westwood One "Mainstream Country" music service.

On November 13, 2023, Dix Broadcasting announced it would sell WQKT and WKVX to River Radio Ministries. The price tag was $3,050,000. River Radio took over operations on May 1, 2024.

Under River Radio Ministries, the station flipped to Christian adult contemporary music. It uses "The River" network from River Radio, primarily simulcasting 104.9 WCVO in Columbus. The station's local morning show, "Morning Edition" moves to WKVX 960. The station continues to air a farming news program, "The Farm Hour with Ron Hamilton." Also continuing are broadcasts of local high school and College of Wooster athletics. All professional sports play-by-play broadcasts were dropped with the sale, except for a few weeks of the Cleveland Cavaliers, whose season ended soon after.
