= WKWO =

Radio station in Wooster, Ohio

- Wooster, Ohio; United States
- Frequency: 90.9 MHz
- Branding: K-Love

Programming
- Format: Contemporary Christian
- Network: K-Love

Ownership
- Owner: Educational Media Foundation

History
- Founded: May 24, 1968
- First air date: 1968 (58 years ago)
- Former call signs: WCWS (1968–1979); WCWS-FM (1979–2020)
- Call sign meaning: "K-Love, Wooster, Ohio"

Technical information
- Licensing authority: FCC
- Facility ID: 65558
- Class: A
- ERP: 2,200 watts
- HAAT: 68 meters (223 ft)
- Transmitter coordinates: 40.8281°N 81.8704°W

Links
- Public license information: Public file; LMS
- Website: www.klove.com

WKWO (90.9 FM) is a radio station licensed to serve Wooster, Ohio. Owned by the Educational Media Foundation (EMF), it broadcasts EMF's Contemporary Christian programming service, K-Love.

The station operated from 1968 to 2019 as WCWS, the campus radio station of The College of Wooster, before the college transitioned it to online-only operation in April 2019. Sold to EMF the following year, WCWS was relaunched as WKWO, carrying K-Love for the Mid-Ohio region.

== History ==
=== WCWS-FM at The College of Wooster ===
The College of Wooster's first venture into radio was the short-lived station WABW, which broadcast for one year in 1926. A carrier current outlet, "WCW", went on the air in 1950, and in 1956, the school struck a deal with commercial station WWST-FM in which the college received two hours of airtime a day.

The WWST-FM agreement ended in November 1966 as FM radio became a more profitable venture, prompting the college to apply for its own station. On September 12, 1967, the college filed for a construction permit of its own, which was granted on December 5. WCWS received its license on May 24, 1968, and it began regular operations that fall. The station broadcast the New York Metropolitan Opera and also was supplied with United Press International wire service.

In the mid-1980s, the station increased its effective radiated power to 890 watts and went stereo. In 1987, WCWS-FM changed frequencies to 90.9 MHz in order to reduce co-channel interference to WKCO at Kenyon College. However, an attempt to increase the station's power further caused unanticipated problems for the college physics department, requiring the transmitter to be moved off campus and to Back Orville Road in 1992.

In 2004, RB Schools, a Texas Christian radio group, challenged the licenses of WCWS-FM and 12 other radio stations during the FCC license renewal process in an attempt to enforce non-consensual time-sharing of the channel. Due to the efforts of the College of Wooster administration, Herman Gibbs, John Finn, and the student management, the FCC denied the challenge in May 2005. As a result, WCWS-FM was revamped as "WOO 91, Wooster's Sound Alternative", with a new image and improved sound; it also began broadcasting 24 hours a day.

In the fall of 2013, WCWS-FM moved out of Wishart Hall to Lowry Center, Wooster’s student center, increasing the visibility of the station on the college's campus.

=== Transition to online and sale to EMF ===
In August 2018, The College of Wooster announced that WOO 91 would become an online-only station, citing the burden of maintaining the facility and increased FCC reporting requirements; the school's dean of students said that the maintenance of the FM station was "no longer sustainable". WCWS-FM went silent on April 8, 2019.

On December 30, 2019, the College of Wooster filed to sell the WCWS-FM license to Educational Media Foundation for $170,000. As a condition of the asset purchase agreement, the transmitter will be relocated to a new site. The call sign was changed to WKWO on March 12, 2020, coincident with the consummation of the sale.
