= WAIS (AM) =

Simulcasting WLOH Lancaster
- Buchtel, Ohio; United States
- Frequency: 770 kHz
- Branding: Wolf Country Radio

Programming
- Format: Country

Ownership
- Owner: Nelsonville TV Cable, Inc.
- Sister stations: WSEO

History
- Call sign meaning: Area Information Station

Technical information
- Licensing authority: FCC
- Facility ID: 48256
- Class: D
- Power: 1,000 watts (days only)
- Transmitter coordinates: 39°25′56.00″N 82°12′2.00″W
- Translator: 103.9 W280FZ (Nelsonville)

Links
- Public license information: Public file; LMS
- Webcast: Listen live
- Website: www.wolfohio.com

WAIS (770 AM) is a radio station broadcasting a country music format. WAIS is licensed to serve the community of Buchtel, Ohio, United States. The station is currently owned by Nelsonville TV Cable, Inc.

On July 31, 2026, WAIS changed their format from Contemporary Christian to a simulcast of country-formatted WLOH 1320 AM Lancaster, branded as "Wolf Country Radio".
