= WGGN-TV =

Television station in Sandusky, Ohio

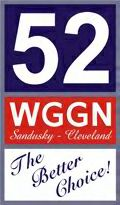
- Sandusky–Cleveland–Toledo, Ohio; United States
- City: Sandusky, Ohio
- Channels: Digital: 3 (VHF); Virtual: 52
- Branding: WGGN-TV 52

Programming
- Affiliations: 52.1: Religious Independent; for others, see § Subchannels

Ownership
- Owner: Christian Broadcasting Ministries; (Christian Faith Broadcast, Inc.)
- Sister stations: WGGN (FM), WLRD

History
- Founded: 1980
- First air date: December 5, 1982
- Former channel numbers: Analog: 52 (UHF, 1982–2009); Digital: 42 (UHF, until 2019); Translator: W33BW 33 Ashland
- Former affiliations: TBN (1982–2008)
- Call sign meaning: Witnessing God's Good News

Technical information
- Licensing authority: FCC
- Facility ID: 11027
- ERP: 10 kW
- HAAT: 283 m (928 ft)
- Transmitter coordinates: 41°4′30.3″N 82°27′4″W

Links
- Public license information: Public file; LMS
- Website: www.cbmtoday.org

WGGN-TV (channel 52) is a religious independent television station licensed to Sandusky, Ohio, United States, serving the Cleveland and Toledo television markets. It is owned by Christian Broadcasting Ministries alongside two religious radio stations: Castalia-licensed WGGN (97.7 FM) and Willard-based WLRD (96.9 FM). The three stations share studios in Castalia; WGGN-TV's transmitter is located in New London.

Operating on a commercial license, the station presently broadcasts religious programming from local churches and national ministries.

== History ==
The station was founded in 1980 and first signed on the air on December 5, 1982, as an affiliate of the Trinity Broadcasting Network. At launch time, the station operated from 4:30 to 11 p.m. and was rejected by some cable companies in the region, such as Fremont Cablevision, due to its limited airtime. As time went on, the station lost its TBN affiliation, but maintained a Christian based religious format.

== Technical information ==
=== Subchannels ===
The station's signal is multiplexed:

Subchannels of WGGN-TV
Subchannel	Res.	Short name	Programming
52.1	1080i	WGGNDTV	Main WGGN-TV programming
52.2	480i	NEWSMAX	Newsmax2
52.4	480i	OAN	One America Plus
52.5	480i	RAV	Real America's Voice

=== Analog-to-digital conversion ===
WGGN-TV shut down its analog signal, over UHF channel 52, on June 12, 2009, the official date on which full-power television stations in the United States transitioned from analog to digital broadcasts under federal mandate. The station's digital signal remained on its pre-transition UHF channel 42, using virtual channel 52.
