= WSEO =

Simulcasting WLOH Lancaster
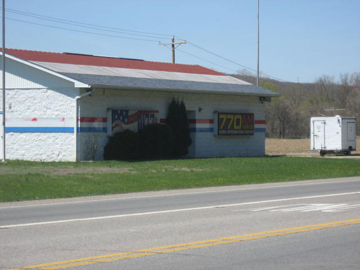
- WSEO studios
- Nelsonville, Ohio; United States
- Frequency: 107.7 MHz
- Branding: Wolf Country Radio

Programming
- Format: Country

Ownership
- Owner: Nelsonville TV Cable
- Sister stations: WAIS

History
- First air date: September 29, 1989
- Former call signs: WSNV (1989–1990); WAIS-FM (1990)
- Call sign meaning: Southeast Ohio

Technical information
- Licensing authority: FCC
- Facility ID: 48258
- Class: A
- ERP: 3,000 watts
- HAAT: 100 meters (330 ft)
- Transmitter coordinates: 39°27′38.00″N 82°13′9.00″W

Links
- Public license information: Public file; LMS
- Webcast: Listen live
- Website: www.wolfohio.com

WSEO (107.7 FM) is a radio station broadcasting a country music format. Licensed to Nelsonville, Ohio, United States, the station is currently owned by Nelsonville TV Cable and under the management of TMCR Broadcasting.

The station went on the air as WSNV on 1989-09-29. On 1990-01-22, the station changed its call sign to WAIS-FM, and on 1990-07-23 to the current WSEO. The station first began broadcasting from studios above its parent company's cable studios in downtown Nelsonville until the early 1990s when its owner built a new cinder-block, windowless station on U.S. Route 33 near the Hocking River, housing WSEO and its sister AM station, WAIS.

The studios were a first of their kind in Ohio in 1993, using an entirely digital production environment for commercial, music and news production. A combination of Contemporary Country, community information, high school sports broadcasting and tight programming likely led to the ratings.

Its local community service area is unique in that Athens, Ohio is not well-served by a commercial television station, leaving residents to depend on radio for most news.

The Cattle Drive at 5 is an all request hour at 5pm. Listeners can call in 740-753-4094 ext. 1 for requests or dedications. The station also features a Theme based countdown hour called the Se7en at 7pm.

On July 31, 2026, WSEO rebranded as "Wolf Country Radio" and began simulcasting WLOH 1320 AM Lancaster.
