= WYRO =

- McArthur, Ohio; United States
- Frequency: 98.7 MHz
- Branding: Pure Rock 98.7

Programming
- Format: Classic rock
- Affiliations: Compass Media Networks; Ohio State Sports Network

Ownership
- Owner: Total Media Group
- Sister stations: WCJO, WKOV-FM, WYPC

History
- First air date: 1997
- Former call signs: WJTD (1994–1997); WCLX (1997–1998); WYPC-FM (1998); WCLX (1998); WJLI (1998–1999)

Technical information
- Licensing authority: FCC
- Facility ID: 29601
- Class: A
- ERP: 5,400 watts
- HAAT: 105 meters (344 ft)
- Transmitter coordinates: 39°8′59.00″N 82°35′36.00″W

Links
- Public license information: Public file; LMS
- Webcast: Listen live
- Website: WYRO Online

WYRO (98.7 FM) is a radio station broadcasting a classic rock format. Licensed to McArthur, Ohio, United States, the station is currently owned by Total Media Group, Inc. It features programming from Compass Media Networks.

== History ==
The station went on the air as WJTD on 1994-03-25. On 1997-06-30, the station changed its call sign to WCLX, on 1998-01-23 to WYPC-FM, on 1998-07-10 to WCLX, on 1998-12-14 to WJLI, and on 1999-09-24 to the current WYRO.

WYRO was previously branded as "Classic Rock 98.7" before changing it to "Pure Rock 98.7". The station has been the radio home for Vinton County Vikings high school sports for the last several years.
