= WDMX =

- Vienna, West Virginia; United States
- Broadcast area: Parkersburg-Marietta
- Frequency: 100.1 MHz
- Branding: Mix 100

Programming
- Format: Classic hits
- Affiliations: Premiere Networks; West Virginia MetroNews

Ownership
- Owner: iHeartMedia, Inc.; (iHM Licenses, LLC)
- Sister stations: WLTP, WNUS, WRVB

History
- First air date: 1989
- Former call signs: WBNN (1987–1989)
- Call sign meaning: WD MiX

Technical information
- Licensing authority: FCC
- Facility ID: 4756
- Class: A
- ERP: 1,650 watts
- HAAT: 134 meters (440 ft)
- Transmitter coordinates: 39°20′18.0″N 81°30′1.0″W

Links
- Public license information: Public file; LMS
- Webcast: Listen live (via iHeartRadio)
- Website: mymix100.iheart.com

WDMX (100.1 FM, "Mix 100") is a classic hits formatted broadcast radio station licensed to Vienna, West Virginia, serving the Parkersburg/Marietta area. WDMX is owned and operated by iHeartMedia, Inc.
