= WCVO =

Coordinates: 40.068°N 82.860°W

- Gahanna, Ohio; United States
- Broadcast area: Columbus, Ohio
- Frequency: 104.9 MHz (HD Radio)
- Branding: 104.9 The River

Programming
- Format: Analog/HD1: Christian contemporary HD2: Christian hip hop "BOOST Radio"

Ownership
- Owner: One Connection Media Group; (River Radio Ministries)
- Sister stations: WZCP, WZNP, WFCO, WQKT, WKVX, WVMC-FM, WSOH, WKEN, WJEE, WHEI

History
- First air date: 1972; 54 years ago
- Call sign meaning: Christian Voice of (Central) Ohio

Technical information
- Licensing authority: FCC
- Facility ID: 11138
- Class: A
- ERP: 6,000 watts
- HAAT: 95.5 meters (313 ft)

Links
- Public license information: Public file; LMS
- Webcast: Listen Live
- Website: riverradio.com

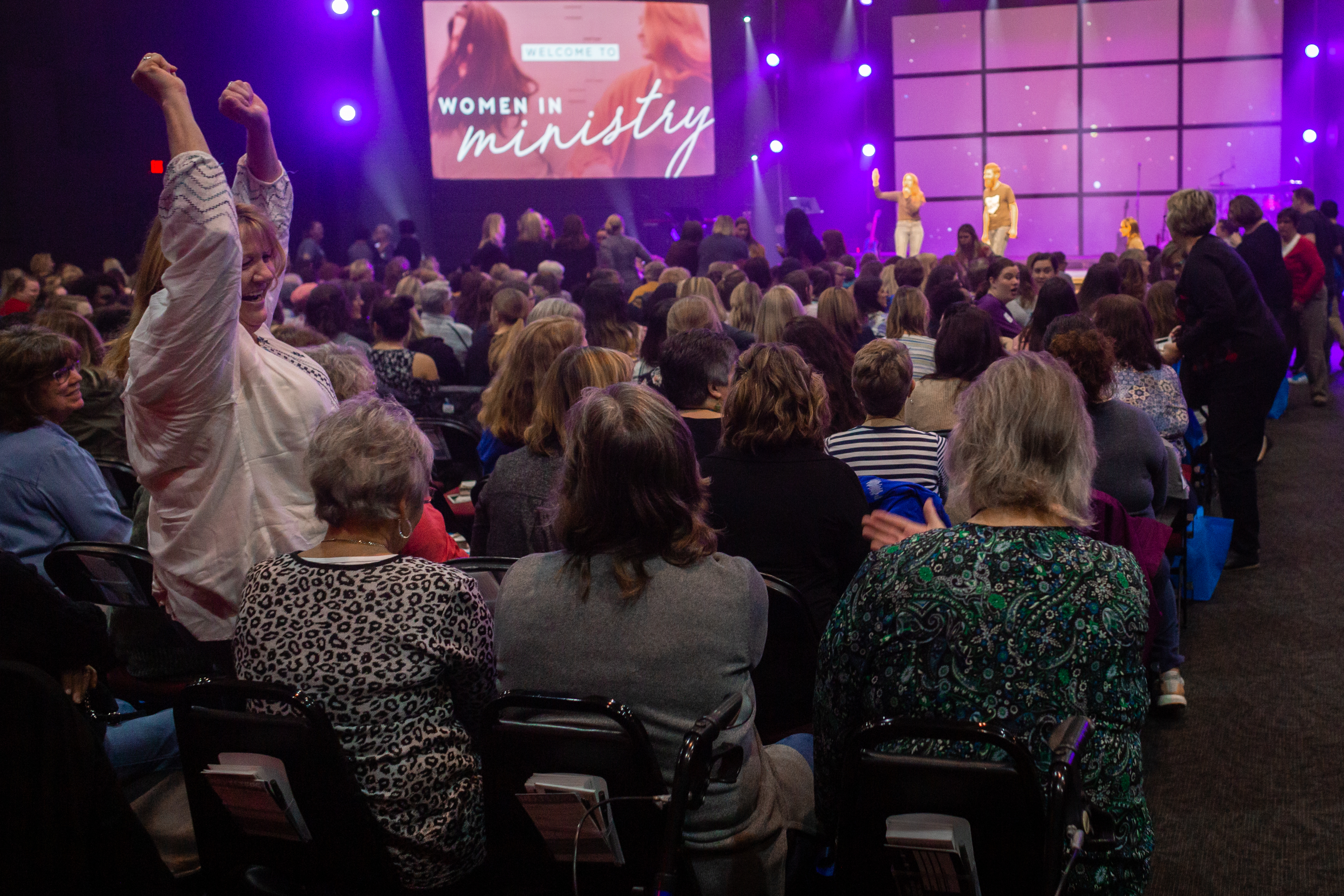
Women in Ministry event

WCVO is a radio station in Gahanna, Ohio, United States located at 104.9 MHz broadcasting family-friendly Christian music as "104.9 the River" in Central Ohio. The station was started by the Christian Voice of Central Ohio (CVCO), which was incorporated in 1964. In 2008, the parent company changed its name to One Connection Media Group. Since 2015, the organization has called itself River Radio Ministries. 104.9 the River's slogan is "Uplifting and Encouraging".

== History ==
WCVO began broadcasting with 3,000 watts on 104.9 FM in 1972, with the studios and tower located at 4400 Reynoldsburg New Albany Road, just south of Ohio 161. An illuminated cross at the top of the tower made the station's facilities easy to locate for several miles. The station's facilities remained located here until 2011, when they relocated the studios to 881 East Johnstown Road. The transmitter is now located along Hamilton Road, broadcasting at 6,000 watts.

The station was the first Christian station to serve Columbus and area communities. For over 25 years the station broadcast a mix of Christian talk, preaching broadcasts, and Christian music of various genres. In 1982, a sister station with a similar format, WCVZ 92.7 FM was started in Zanesville, Ohio.

Christian Voice of Central Ohio, Inc. (CVCO) valued prayer to the point of dedicating a room in their facilities as a "Prayer Chapel", and broadcast a daily "Prayer Line" program that invited listeners to call and share prayer needs, which were lifted in prayer by volunteer hosts.

CVCO is a non-profit 501c3 organization, and has relied throughout its history on donations from listeners and business underwriters. Each year a "Sharathon" event invited participation by listeners.

In April 2016, the Ohio Supreme Court determined that WCVO-FM is considered a place of "public worship" and therefore exempt from property taxes, overturning an earlier decision by Ohio tax commissioner Joseph Testa.

WCVO broadcasts in the HD Radio format.
