= WDPR =

Classical radio station in Dayton, Ohio

- Dayton, Ohio; United States
- Broadcast area: Dayton metropolitan area
- Frequency: 88.1 MHz (HD Radio)
- Branding: Discover Classical

Programming
- Format: Classical music

Ownership
- Owner: Dayton Public Radio

History
- First air date: November 11, 1985
- Former frequencies: 89.5 MHz (1985–1998)
- Call sign meaning: "Dayton Public Radio"

Technical information
- Licensing authority: FCC
- Facility ID: 61582
- Class: A
- ERP: 780 watts
- HAAT: 238 meters (781 ft)
- Transmitter coordinates: 39°43′16.00″N 84°15′0.00″W
- Repeaters: 89.9 WDPG (Greenville); 89.1 WUSO (Springfield)

Links
- Public license information: Public file; LMS
- Webcast: Listen live
- Website: DiscoverClassical.org

WDPR (88.1 FM) is a non-commercial educational radio station licensed to Dayton, Ohio, carrying a classical music format branded "Discover Classical". Owned by Dayton Public Radio, WDPR's primary signal serves the Dayton metropolitan area. The station's reach is extended via WDPG (89.9 FM) in Greenville and WUSO (89.1 FM) in Springfield. WDPR's studios and transmitter are located separately inside Suite 110 on North Main Street and Guthrie Road in Dayton, while WDPG's transmitter resides in Greenville; WUSO's transmitter is located on the campus of Wittenberg University on Woodlawn Avenue in Springfield. In addition to a standard analog transmission, WDPR is available online.

== History ==
WDPR signed on November 11, 1985 at 89.5, moving to 88.1 in June 1998. Its original city of license was West Carrollton, Ohio. WDPR's old transmitter at 89.5 only operated at 6,000 watts to protect Louisville's WFPL at nearby 89.3. Its current transmitter at 88.1 only operates at 780 watts to protect WNAS in New Albany, Indiana; also at 88.1.

WDPG signed on in February 1994. WDPG went on the air after the demise of the former WGVO (91.9 MHz), which was operated by the Greenville City Schools.
