= WCMO-LP =

Radio station at Marietta College in Marietta, Ohio

- Marietta, Ohio; United States
- Broadcast area: Marietta
- Frequency: 97.5 MHz

Programming
- Format: College radio

Ownership
- Owner: Marietta College
- Sister stations: WMRT

History
- First air date: October 1, 1960 (Note: As the full-service, Class D license WCMO. This was replaced by WCMO-LP in 2024, representing a power upgrade.)
- Former call signs: WCMO (1960–2024)
- Former frequencies: 89.3 MHz (1960–1984); 98.5 MHz (1984–2024)
- Call sign meaning: College Marietta Ohio

Technical information
- Licensing authority: FCC
- Facility ID: 778001
- Class: D
- ERP: 100 watts
- HAAT: 26 meters (85 ft)
- Transmitter coordinates: 39°25′8″N 81°26′33″W

Links
- Public license information: LMS
- Website: Official website

WCMO-LP (97.5 FM) is a student-run radio station at Marietta College in Marietta, Ohio, United States. It provides music and talk programming. WCMO-LP is one of two stations owned by Marietta College along with WMRT (88.3 FM), which offers classical and jazz music and is managed by the college's communications department. Both stations broadcast from studios in the McKinney Media Center.

WCMO began broadcasting on October 1, 1960, originally at 89.3 MHz. After WMRT launched in 1975 as a higher-power home for its arts programming, WCMO was off the air for a year before returning as a student station in 1976. In 2024, its original license was replaced with a new low-power FM license that enabled a power increase from 10 watts to 100.

== History ==
Marietta College had a carrier current station known as WMCO as early as January 1949. It applied on February 25, 1960 for a new FM radio station to be located in Andrews Hall on the campus with a 10-watt transmitter, and received the construction permit on April 27. WCMO began broadcasting on October 1, 1960; the FM and carrier current stations simulcast most of their output. WCMO broadcast a mix of jazz, classical, and educational programs as well as Top 40–type "personality" programming with student DJs.

Over the course of the 1960s, student demands for programming, especially of rock music, became increasingly divergent with WCMO's more staid format. In 1966, even though many members of the student senate wished for change at WCMO, they voted to drop a senate investigation of the station's format. The acting director of broadcasting at that time, Ralph Matheny, told the senate that WCMO was intended to provide "a unique cultural and educational service to the people of the town and campus" but that "WCMO feels that this cultural aspect does not include rock". In November 1975, Marietta College started a second station with higher power and greater coverage beyond the college campus: WMRT 88.3. For a year, WCMO was off the air until it was reorganized as a student-run station in November 1976,

In 1984, the station moved to 98.5 FM with 4 watts. The tower was moved from Andrews Hall to Cisler Hill, where WMRT's transmitter was located, to increase coverage; by that time, WCMO was operating for four hours a day. By 1992, the station was on the air from 3 p.m. to midnight during the school year, with each day divided into three three-hour DJ shifts primarily incorporating classic rock and alternative music.

In 2023, Marietta College filed an application with the Federal Communications Commission (FCC) for a Low Power FM (LPFM) license with an increase in the station's effective radiated power to 100 watts and a change in frequency to 97.5 MHz. The FCC issued a construction permit for the new station in early 2024. The original WCMO license went off the air October 10, 2024, and its license returned to the FCC.
