= WCJO =

- Jackson, Ohio; United States
- Frequency: 97.7 MHz
- Branding: 97 Country- The Bull

Programming
- Format: Country music
- Affiliations: Compass Media Networks; Agri Broadcast Network

Ownership
- Owner: Total Media Group
- Sister stations: WKOV-FM, WYPC, WYRO

Technical information
- Licensing authority: FCC
- Facility ID: 29684
- Class: A
- ERP: 3,000 watts
- HAAT: 91.0 meters (298.6 ft)
- Transmitter coordinates: 39°1′45.00″N 82°35′51.00″W

Links
- Public license information: Public file; LMS
- Webcast: Listen Live
- Website: WCJO Online

WCJO (97.7 FM) is an American commercial radio station broadcasting a country music format. Licensed to Jackson, Ohio, United States, the station is currently owned by Total Media Group, Inc. and features programming from Compass Media Networks. Before its present-day branding as "97 Country- The Bull", the station was known as "Hot Country 97.7".
