= WHEI =

- Tiffin, Ohio; United States
- Frequency: 88.9 MHz
- Branding: Rise FM

Programming
- Format: Contemporary Christian music

Ownership
- Owner: Mark Boyer; (Soaring Eagle Promotions Inc.)

History
- Call sign meaning: HEIdelberg (previous licensee Heidelberg University)

Technical information
- Licensing authority: FCC
- Facility ID: 26688
- Class: A
- ERP: 100 watts
- HAAT: 18.0 meters
- Transmitter coordinates: 41°6′59.00″N 83°10′3.00″W

Links
- Public license information: Public file; LMS
- Website: https://risefmohio.com/

WHEI (88.9 FM) is a radio station licensed to Tiffin, Ohio. The station is owned by Mark Boyer, through Soaring Eagle Promotions Inc.

On December 17, 2021, the station was rebranded as "Rise FM".

In 2024, Rise FM merged with River Radio Ministries.
