= WMRT =

Radio station at Marietta College in Marietta, Ohio

- Marietta, Ohio; United States
- Broadcast area: Parkersburg-Marietta
- Frequency: 88.3 MHz

Programming
- Format: Classical, jazz

Ownership
- Owner: Marietta College
- Sister stations: WCMO-LP

History
- First air date: November 17, 1975
- Call sign meaning: "Marietta"

Technical information
- Licensing authority: FCC
- Facility ID: 40117
- Class: B1
- ERP: 9,200 watts
- HAAT: 62 meters
- Transmitter coordinates: 39°25′07″N 81°26′32″W

Links
- Public license information: Public file; LMS
- Webcast: Listen live
- Website: www.marietta.edu/student-media-wmrtfm

WMRT (88.3 FM) is a radio station at Marietta College in Marietta, Ohio, United States, broadcasting a classical music and jazz music format. The station is one of two stations on the Marietta College campus; WMRT is managed by the college's communications department, while WCMO-LP 97.5 is student-oriented and student-led. WMRT went on the air in 1975 and has retained its format throughout its history.

== History ==
The Federal Communications Commission (FCC) granted Marietta College a construction permit on January 31, 1974, to build a radio station broadcasting at 88.3 MHz. WMRT began broadcasting November 17, 1975. From the beginning, WMRT was designed to be more regional and public-oriented than the college's existing station, WCMO; its original lineup included classical, folk and jazz music programs. WCMO had been running much of this programming, but it broadcast with 10 watts, and the move freed that facility to become a student-led outlet in 1976. It also offered radio courses for distance learners. The station operated from the basement of Andrews Hall until the McKinney Media Center opened in 1984.

In 1997, WMRT debuted local news broadcasts produced by journalism and radio production students. Two years later, the station was upgraded with the installation of an automation system, making operation more efficient and less staff-intensive. For a time beginning in December 2004, Fine Arts Radio rebroadcast WMRT to the Athens area on a translator. This filled a void in that area created when WOUB-FM dropped classical music earlier that year. The McKinney Media Center studios were renovated in 2017.

Though WMRT airs some student-produced programming, most of its output comes from the WFMT Radio Network as well as the Metropolitan Opera and public radio distributor PRX. Seven Ranges Radio Company, owner of commercial station WVVV in the Parkersburg–Marietta area, provides engineering and automation support services for WMRT and built its studio facilities.
