= WMVR-FM =

- Sidney, Ohio; United States
- Frequency: 105.5 MHz
- Branding: Hits 105.5

Programming
- Format: Hot adult contemporary
- Affiliations: Westwood One; Agri Broadcast Network; Buckeye Ag Radio Network; Ohio State Sports Network

Ownership
- Owner: Michelle Stallard; (Fender Broadcasting, LLC)

History
- First air date: 1965
- Call sign meaning: "Miami Valley Radio"

Technical information
- Licensing authority: FCC
- Facility ID: 15998
- Class: A
- ERP: 6,000 watts
- HAAT: 47 meters (154 ft)
- Transmitter coordinates: 40.301°N 84.206°W

Links
- Public license information: Public file; LMS
- Webcast: Listen live
- Website: www.hits1055.com

WMVR-FM (105.5 MHz, "Hits 105.5") is a commercial radio station licensed to Sidney, Ohio, broadcasting a hot adult contemporary music format. Its studios, offices, and transmitter are located on Russell Road, just outside Sidney.

== History ==
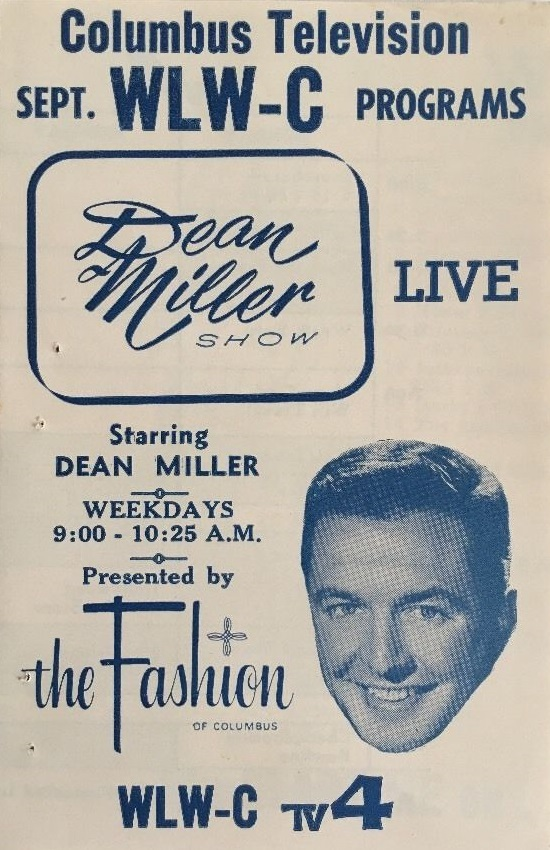
Advertisement for The Dean Miller Show on WLW-C (now WCMH-TV) in Columbus

On January 8, 1964, the Federal Communications Commission granted the Van Wert Broadcasting Company—owner of WMVR (1080 AM), which signed on November 21, 1963—a construction permit for an FM station on 105.5 MHz. The station signed on in 1965; it simulcast and continued the programming of the AM station, a daytime-only outlet.

In 1966, WMVR-AM-FM was purchased by the Dean Miller Broadcasting Corporation, owned by Dean Miller, an actor and Ohio native. Before coming to Sidney, Miller had been a television personality and actor in Hollywood. He was best known for the role of Matt Henshaw on the Desilu-produced CBS sitcom December Bride from 1954 to 1959, co-starring with Spring Byington, Frances Rafferty, Verna Felton, and Harry Morgan. He later co-hosted the NBC daytime celebrity interview series Here's Hollywood, with Helen O'Connell, in addition to appearances on the NBC game show Your First Impression and as an occasional fill-in host for Art Linkletter's House Party on CBS. A Hamilton, Ohio, native, Miller (born Dean C. Stuhmueller, Sr.,) began his career essentially as a radio broadcaster before a by-chance meeting with some Hollywood executives who agreed to give the young Miller a chance to act. Miller graduated from Ohio State University in Columbus. Miller also hosted a talk and variety show on WLW-C television (now WCMH-TV) in the early 1960s.

Miller moved the WMVR stations from their original home in the Taylor Building downtown to their present location in the summer of 1969. At that time, the stations began offering separate programming, with a full service/middle of the road format on AM and beautiful music on FM. In the 1980s, the station switched to hot adult contemporary as Hits 105.5. The AM station, which had simulcast the FM for most of the period aside from attempts at big band and news/talk formats, was closed in November 2000 after one of the towers was blown down in a storm.

Dean Miller died January 13, 2004, at his home in Grosse Pointe, Michigan. His widow, Ida, owned WMVR-FM until her death on May 6, 2014. The station remained owned by his family.

On August 3, 2015, WMVR-FM changed formats to adult hits, branded as "105.5 TAM FM", with the letters TAM representing "Totally About Music".

In March 2022, the station was sold to Fender Broadcasting, a company owned by the station's assistant general manager Michelle Stallard. After the acquisition was completed on June 24, 2022, the station reverted to its previous hot AC format and branding Hits 105.5 on September 6.
