= WZZZ =

- Portsmouth, Ohio; United States
- Frequency: 107.5 MHz
- Branding: 107.5 The Breeze

Programming
- Format: Classic rock
- Affiliations: Total Media Sports

Ownership
- Owner: Total Media Group Inc.
- Sister stations: WNXT, WNXT-FM

History
- First air date: 2003
- Former call signs: WNPM (2000–2002)

Technical information
- Licensing authority: FCC
- Facility ID: 88356
- Class: A
- ERP: 2,600 watts
- HAAT: 151 meters
- Transmitter coordinates: 38°43′22″N 82°59′56″W

Links
- Public license information: Public file; LMS
- Webcast: Listen Live
- Website: WZZZ Online

WZZZ (107.5 FM) is a radio station broadcasting a classic rock format. Licensed to Portsmouth, Ohio, United States, the station is currently owned by Total Media Group Inc. and is programmed locally.

== History ==
The station went on the air as WNPM on April 12, 2000. On December 16, 2002, the station changed its call sign to the current WZZZ.
