= WNUS =

- Belpre, Ohio; United States
- Broadcast area: Parkersburg-Marietta
- Frequency: 107.1 MHz
- Branding: Country 107 NUS

Programming
- Format: Country
- Affiliations: Premiere Networks

Ownership
- Owner: iHeartMedia, Inc.; (iHM Licenses, LLC)
- Sister stations: WDMX, WLTP, WRVB

Technical information
- Licensing authority: FCC
- Facility ID: 67465
- Class: A
- ERP: 3,800 watts
- HAAT: 127 meters (417 ft)
- Transmitter coordinates: 39°18′36″N 81°35′49″W

Links
- Public license information: Public file; LMS
- Webcast: Listen Live
- Website: 107nus.iheart.com

WNUS (107.1 FM) is a radio station broadcasting a country format. Licensed to Belpre, Ohio, United States, it serves the Parkersburg-Marietta area. The station is currently owned by iHeartMedia, Inc.
