= Wasit (Amran) =

Wast واسط
- Sub-district
- Location in Yemen
- Country: Yemen
- Governorate: 'Amran Governorate
- District: Harf Sufyan District

Population (2004)
  - Total: 2,729
- Time zone: UTC+3

Wast (Arabic: واسط) is a sub-district located in Harf Sufyan District, 'Amran Governorate, Yemen. Wast had a population of 2729 according to the 2004 census.
