= WRVB =

- Marietta, Ohio; United States
- Broadcast area: Marietta-Parkersburg
- Frequency: 102.1 MHz
- Branding: 102 The River

Programming
- Format: Top 40 (CHR)
- Affiliations: Premiere Networks

Ownership
- Owner: iHeartMedia, Inc.; (iHM Licenses, LLC)
- Sister stations: WDMX, WNUS, WLTP

History
- Call sign meaning: "River"

Technical information
- Licensing authority: FCC
- Facility ID: 68306
- Class: B1
- ERP: 11,000 watts
- HAAT: 150 meters (490 ft)
- Transmitter coordinates: 39°19′27″N 81°37′33″W

Links
- Public license information: Public file; LMS
- Webcast: Listen live (via iHeartRadio)
- Website: 102theriver.iheart.com

WRVB (102.1 FM) is a radio station broadcasting a top 40 (CHR) format. Licensed to Marietta, Ohio, United States, it serves the Parkersburg-Marietta area. The station is currently owned by iHeartMedia, Inc. and features the bulk of its programming from iHeartMedia's Premiere Networks subsidy.

== History ==
The station originated in competing applications for a new FM station on 94.3 MHz. William G. Wells and R. Sanford Guyer, doing business as Marietta Broadcasting Company, owned WMOA on 1490 AM; the competing applicant, 5 KW, Inc., owned WBRJ on 910 AM. On February 17, 1965, the Federal Communications Commission (FCC) designated the applications for a comparative hearing. Following an agreement between the applicants, the FCC dismissed 5 KW's application and granted Marietta Broadcasting a construction permit on June 23, 1965, authorizing 3,000 watts on 94.3 MHz. Broadcasting began on December 1, 1966, under the call sign WMOA-FM.

In 1967, Wells and Guyer agreed to sell WMOA and WMOA-FM to W. Ernst Minor for $190,000, subject to FCC approval. The FCC granted WMOA-FM's initial station license on October 9, 1967. In 1969, Minor agreed to sell his 51 percent interest in the stations' licensee, Major-Minor Corporation, to general manager Ray H. Rosenblum for $90,000. Rosenblum already owned the remaining 49 percent.

In May 1978, the FCC ordered a hearing on the renewal applications for WMOA and WMOA-FM. The issues included whether the licensee had exceeded its representations concerning commercial time and whether its financial reports and responses to FCC inquiries were accurate. In a decision announced June 29, 1979, administrative law judge James F. Tierney granted the stations' renewal applications and imposed a $3,500 fine for excessive commercial time. By 1981, WMOA-FM was broadcasting a beautiful music format.

On June 28, 1983, the FCC approved the sale of WMOA and WMOA-FM by Rosenblum's WMOA, Inc., to Employe Owned Broadcasting Corporation for $1 million, including a noncompetition agreement. The buyer, headed by Carl Clovis, already owned WBRJ. To comply with the FCC's ownership rules, WMOA's AM license was to be transferred separately to Washington Technical College. Later in 1983, the FM station's call sign was changed to WEYQ.

In December 1986, the FCC authorized WEYQ to change from channel 232A, corresponding to 94.3 MHz, to channel 271A, corresponding to 102.1 MHz. The allocation change took effect on February 2, 1987. A further order adopted July 21, 1987, approved an upgrade from Class A to Class B1 on 102.1 MHz, requiring a transmitter site southwest of Marietta; that allocation change became effective September 21.

In 1988, Tschudy Communications Corporation, headed by Earl Judy Jr., agreed to purchase WEYQ and WBRJ for $1,112,000. WEYQ was then listed as an adult contemporary station on 94.3 MHz. By late 1991, it was broadcasting on 102.1 MHz. By 1994, WEYQ was airing contemporary hit radio with an effective radiated power of 11,000 watts.

In 1994, Tschudy, then operating in bankruptcy proceedings, agreed to sell WEYQ to Marietta Radio Properties, a subsidiary of Burbach Broadcasting Company, for $600,000. Tschudy terminated the agreement on December 28, 1994, and the proposed sale became the subject of litigation.

WEYQ went off the air in early 1995. Its call sign became WURN on March 6. By mid-March, it had resumed broadcasting with soft adult contemporary programming supplied by Westwood One and had entered a local marketing agreement with WRZZ. By November 1995, the station had replaced its former "Q-102" branding with "Sunny 102".

In 1998, 102, Inc., headed by William Benns III, agreed to purchase WURN from Tschudy for $900,000. The call sign changed to WRVB on July 7, 1998. By mid-July, the station had replaced soft adult contemporary with a modern adult contemporary format using the "River" branding. By August 1999, WRVB was being classified as a contemporary hit radio station.

In 1999, Clear Channel Communications agreed to acquire WRVB as part of an $11.5 million purchase of four Parkersburg–Marietta stations from Benns's companies. The transaction also included an option to acquire WRZZ. By 2001, WRVB was listed as a Clear Channel-owned contemporary hit radio station.

Clear Channel's parent company adopted the iHeartMedia name on September 16, 2014. In 2026, WRVB operated under iHeartMedia ownership with a contemporary hit radio format and the branding "102 The River".
