= WSOH =

Coordinates: 40.3353°N 83.6628°W

- Zanesfield, Ohio; United States
- Broadcast area: Bellefontaine, Ohio; West Liberty, Ohio
- Frequency: 88.9 MHz
- Branding: Rise FM

Programming
- Format: Christian Contemporary Music

Ownership
- Owner: Soaring Eagle Promotions, Inc.
- Sister stations: WKEN

Technical information
- Licensing authority: FCC
- Facility ID: 176916
- Class: A
- ERP: 400 Watts
- HAAT: 130 meters

Links
- Public license information: Public file; LMS
- Webcast: Listen Online
- Website: http://risefmohio.com/

WSOH is a radio station licensed to Zanesfield, Ohio broadcasting on 88.9 FM. WSOH airs a Christian contemporary music format and is owned by Soaring Eagle Promotions, Inc. The station operates in a simulcast with sister station WKEN.

Former logo as Shine FM

On December 17, 2021, the station was rebranded as "Rise FM".

In 2024, Rise FM merged with River Radio Ministries.
