= WVMC-FM =

Radio station in Mansfield, Ohio

- Mansfield, Ohio; United States
- Frequency: 90.7 MHz
- Branding: Rise FM

Programming
- Format: Contemporary Christian

Ownership
- Owner: Soaring Eagle Promotions, Inc.

History
- First air date: April 29, 1979

Technical information
- Licensing authority: FCC
- Facility ID: 39815
- Class: A
- ERP: 1,550 watts
- HAAT: 75 meters
- Transmitter coordinates: 40°43′22.8″N 82°31′51.6″W
- Translators: 91.1 W216AH (Ashland); 102.7 W274AN (Wooster)

Links
- Public license information: Public file; LMS
- Webcast: Listen Live
- Website: http://risefmohio.com

WVMC-FM (90.7 MHz) is a listener supported contemporary Christian music radio station in Mansfield, Ohio. It operates translator stations in Ashland, Ohio (91.1 MHz), and in Wooster, Ohio (102.7 MHz).

The station signed on April 29, 1979, from Mansfield Christian School, the original owner of the station.

WVMC aired a Christian CHR/Hit format provided by the WAY-FM Network until July 1, 2013, when WAY-FM ceased providing programming via satellite to non-owned stations. At that time, the station switched to a contemporary Praise and Worship Music format branded as "Total Praise."

Effective April 13, 2021, Mansfield Christian School sold WVMC-FM and translators W216AH and W274AN to Soaring Eagle Promotions, Inc.

On December 17, 2021, the station was rebranded as "Rise FM".

In 2024, Rise FM merged with River Radio Ministries.
