= WKOV-FM =

- Oak Hill, Ohio; United States
- Broadcast area: Jackson, Ohio
- Frequency: 96.7 MHz
- Branding: Mix 96.7

Programming
- Format: Adult contemporary
- Affiliations: Compass Media Networks

Ownership
- Owner: Total Media Group
- Sister stations: WCJO, WYRO, WYPC

History
- First air date: 1971

Technical information
- Licensing authority: FCC
- Facility ID: 29691
- Class: B1
- ERP: 16,000 watts
- HAAT: 129.0 meters (423.2 ft)
- Transmitter coordinates: 39°1′45.00″N 82°35′51.00″W

Links
- Public license information: Public file; LMS
- Webcast: Listen Live
- Website: WKOV-FM Online

WKOV-FM (96.7 MHz) is a radio station broadcasting an adult contemporary format. Licensed to Oak Hill, Ohio, United States, it serves the Jackson, Ohio area. The station is currently owned by Total Media Group. The station formerly carried a hot adult contemporary format as "Star 96.7", later "Fever 96.7" and currently, "Mix 96.7". The WKOV call letters were originally used for 1570 AM, which was moved to 1330 AM (another Jackson County Broadcasting owned station presently known as WYPC) starting in 1952 before adding an FM counterpart. By 1991, the WKOV call letters were exclusive to 96.7 FM.

== Current Logo ==
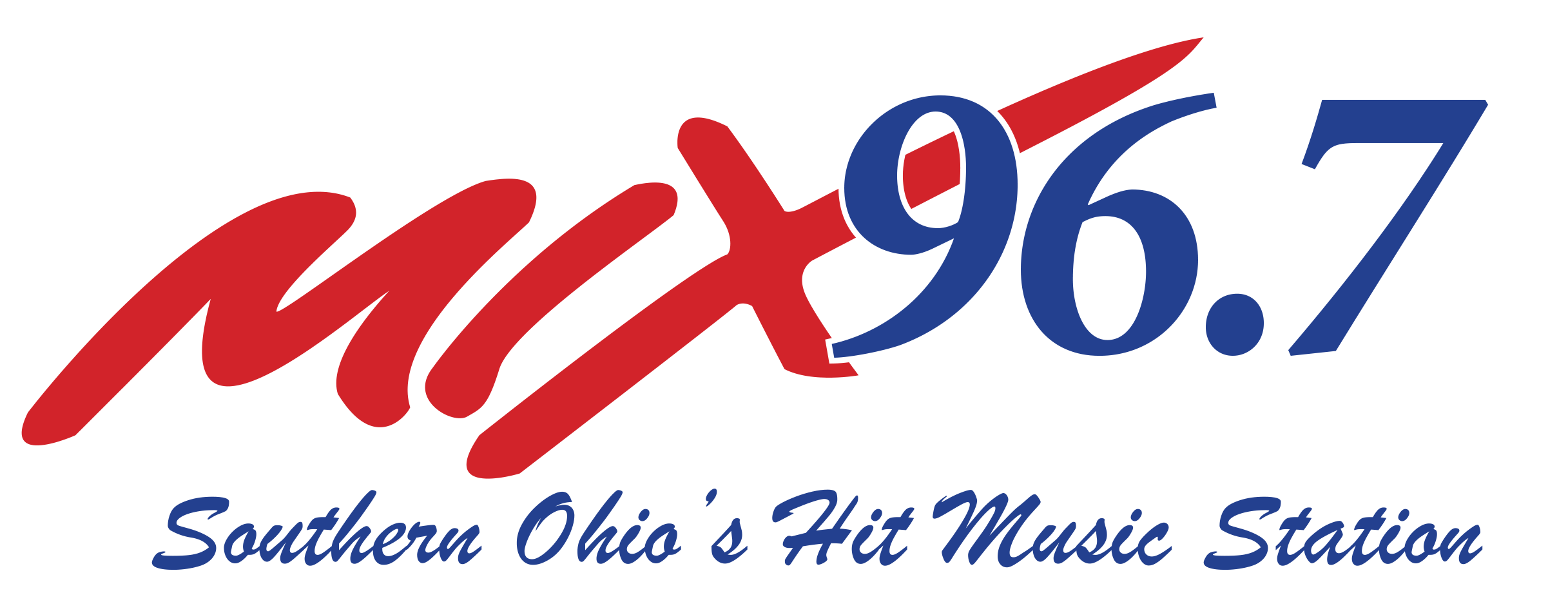
