= WUSO =

Radio station in Springfield, Ohio, U.S.

Simulcast of WDPR, Dayton, OH
- Springfield, Ohio; United States
- Frequency: 89.1 MHz
- Branding: Dayton Public Radio

Programming
- Format: Classical music
- Affiliations: WDPR

Ownership
- Owner: Dayton Public Radio, Inc.

History
- First air date: February 20, 1966
- Call sign meaning: Wittenberg University, Springfield, Ohio

Technical information
- Licensing authority: FCC
- Facility ID: 65468
- Class: A
- ERP: 100 watts
- HAAT: 26 meters (85 ft)
- Transmitter coordinates: 39°56′9.00″N 83°48′41.00″W

Links
- Public license information: Public file; LMS
- Webcast: Listen live
- Website: discoverclassical.org

WUSO (89.1 FM) is a non-commercial educational radio station licensed to Springfield, Ohio, United States. It is owned by Dayton Public Radio, Inc. and rebroadcasts the classical music programming of WDPR in Dayton on a full-time basis from its transmitter atop Tower Hall on the Wittenberg University campus.

From 1966 to 2019, WUSO was Wittenberg's student-run college radio station, with studios in Firestine Hall on the campus.

== History ==
=== Radio returns to Wittenberg ===
Wittenberg University (WU) received a construction permit from the Federal Communications Commission (FCC) to build a new 10-watt radio station on the campus on October 11, 1965. Organization on campus for a new station had dated to 1961, when a radio club was formed with 35 students. Two years later, a student committee was formed to analyze the idea, and the university appropriated funds to purchase equipment. On February 20, 1966, WUSO began broadcasting. The station represented the return of broadcasting to the university, which had shown an interest in radio transmissions beginning in 1896. Signing on in 1922, station WCSO (Note: Preceded earlier in the year by experimental 8XAK, this station was originally assigned the WNAP call letters, which were changed to WCSO on March 6, 1925.)—the university being Wittenberg College at the time—operated until 1930, when it was shuttered as part of a consolidation that formed WGAR, a new station in Cleveland.

WUSO initially broadcast for six hours a day; by 1971, it was on for three hours in the morning and then 11 hours in the evening. The station survived a 1977 funding cut by the WU student government (SGA) that nearly threatened it with closure because it suggested relocating the facility without considering the technical and legal implications of such a move. Pressure from SGA forced cutbacks, such as the elimination of a news wire, as well as internal reforms. Studios were in the basement of Alumni House before relocating to Sprecher Hall in 1979. The move required major changes and left the station off the air for a year and a half, and it also saw the station convert to stereo broadcasting.

Over time, WUSO began operating with a freeform format, a contrast to the Top 40-heavy FM dial in the area. Programs ranged from Christian rock to jazz; in 1986, station manager Krista May did on-air shifts hosting a punk rock show under the name "Chrystal Meth". However, despite a series of efforts over the years, WUSO remained a 10-watt outlet. By 1986, the original transmitter was out of service for six weeks during the winter term. Even with 10 watts, the station attracted substantial interest on campus: there were 120 DJs in 1990. The station narrowly survived another financial challenge again in 1996 when the student senate made a grant to allow the station to purchase Emergency Alert System equipment that it needed in order to meet requirements for the new service. The station abandoned Sprecher Hall in 1998 as part of its demolition, moving into the basement of Firestine Hall and replacing much of its equipment in the process.

=== Upgrade to 120 watts ===
As a Class D station operating on the same 10-watt basis as in 1966, WUSO was vulnerable. In the late 1970s, the FCC encouraged many stations to upgrade to Class A status—100 watts minimum—and left Class D stations a secondary service, vulnerable to being bumped by other stations. Furthermore, even though the transmitter was atop Tower Hall, students living there sometimes had trouble receiving the station. WUSO had twice solicited power increases, first in 1971 and then in 1986. However, such changes also would have come with needed upgrades to professionalize even as FCC restrictions tightened the ability of Class D stations to upgrade. Alongside moving to Firestine, the station mounted a third effort at a power increase, hoping to avoid the paperwork-related problems that had plagued past pushes. The proposed increase turned into a years-long legal battle in the wake of two related applications from Christian groups, the American Family Association and Life Radio Ministries. This conflict was lengthened because the FCC overhauled the process by which it compared applications for non-commercial educational radio stations, leaving the three applications—WUSO's improvement and the two new Christian radio stations, one for Urbana and one for Delaware—in a mutually exclusive group. The three parties then filed a universal settlement, granting WUSO's improvement and the Delaware new station application, which was granted on April 25, 2003.

In November 2004, WUSO upgraded from 10 watts to 120, improving its coverage area and signal strength in the Springfield area. In December 2003, Wittenberg athletics moved to WUSO from commercial station WULM; the move came in the middle of the basketball season after WULM refused to produce and carry broadcasts of Wittenberg women's basketball games. WUSO also initiated online streaming in 2006. WUSO's studios in the basement of Firestine Hall were flooded when a water pipe burst on April 8, 2012. Four feet of water inundated the facilities, and the studio equipment was a total loss. The station was off the air for nearly a year; the studios were rebuilt with increased space for live bands to play and an expanded lobby. By 2018, the station had 18 student-produced shows on its lineup.

=== Sale to Dayton Public Radio ===
In August 2017, WUSO entered into a partnership with WDPR Dayton Public Radio to rebroadcast its classical music programming from 6 a.m. to 2 p.m. on weekdays. As WDPR's signal does not reach Springfield, this expanded the service's coverage. In March 2019, WUSO began rebroadcasting WDPR on a full-time basis, and WU filed in December 2022 to sell the station outright to DPR for $94,580. The sale was consummated on March 13, 2023.
