= WBBY-FM =

Radio station in Westerville, Ohio (1969–1990)

- Westerville, Ohio; United States
- Frequency: 103.9 MHz

Ownership
- Owner: Mid-Ohio Communications, Inc.

History
- First air date: May 5, 1969
- Last air date: December 31, 1990
- Former call signs: WBBY (1969–1982)

Technical information
- ERP: 2,000 watts

WBBY-FM was a radio station in Westerville, Ohio, United States.

== History ==
On June 19, 1968, Mid-Ohio Communications was granted a construction permit for a new FM radio station on 103.9 FM in Westerville, which signed on May 5, 1969. It broadcast with an effective radiated power of 2,000 watts, with a format of oldies and rock music.

WBBY-FM's troubles began in earnest in December 1977, with a dispute between William S. Bates, the majority stockholder, and the other owners of the station. On the 9th, the owners obtained a restraining order against Bates, saying he had "brought ridicule and disgrace" to the station, insulted customers, and made obscene gestures. The Delaware County court found that Bates likely suffered from a mental condition. Among the other shareholders of Mid-Ohio Communications was Ken Bates, William's son. The restraining order was never delivered. Four days later, Bates was spotted at the station at 5:45 am. The news director, on site at the time, called the sheriff's office. He barricaded himself in his son's office and the facility and did not leave for 10 hours. Bates continued to be a thorn in WBBY-FM's side. In February 1979, he stole equipment from the station, forcing it off the air. In May, he served a 10-day jail sentence and was fined $500 for violating the restraining order. Not long after, it became the jazz station of record for Columbus, a format it would hold for the rest of its life.

In 1981, William R. Bates's share of WBBY-FM was involuntarily transferred to the QNP Corporation, a business of Richard (Carl) Nourse, as a result of divorce proceedings. The extent of Nourse's involvement in the station became the central factor in years of new legal proceedings that followed. In 1982, its license renewal was designated for hearing alongside a competing proposal for the frequency from Metro Broadcasting, Inc. While WBBY initially was to lose its license, Metro dropped out of the running when it was bought out by Nourse, and the administrative law judge approved the renewal of WBBY's license despite a new finding: that Nourse, who was claimed to be the station manager spending 40 hours per week at WBBY, was actually working full-time at his family's car dealership in Marietta, Ohio, 120 miles (190 km) away.

The FCC Review Board, however, did not agree. In July 1986, it ruled that WBBY should lose its license. The review board, using an automotive metaphor, wrote that Nourse had been a mere "hood ornament" at WBBY-FM, spending most of his time in Marietta. After several appeals, the full FCC unanimously agreed with the review board in February 1990, finding "a pattern ... of deliberate concealment and false statements" by Mid-Ohio. WBBY-FM ceased operations December 31, 1990, resulting in 20 job losses.
