= WKEN =

Coordinates: 40°40′25″N 83°36′32″W

- Kenton, Ohio; United States
- Frequency: 88.5 MHz
- Branding: Rise FM

Programming
- Format: Christian Contemporary Music

Ownership
- Owner: Soaring Eagle Promotions, Inc.
- Sister stations: WSOH

Technical information
- Licensing authority: FCC
- Facility ID: 174814
- Class: A
- ERP: 2800 Watts
- HAAT: 59 meters (194 ft)

Links
- Public license information: Public file; LMS
- Webcast: Listen Online
- Website: https://risefmohio.com/

WKEN is a radio station licensed to Kenton, Ohio broadcasting on 88.5 FM. WKEN airs a Christian contemporary music format and is owned by Soaring Eagle Promotions, Inc. The station operates in a simulcast with sister station WSOH.

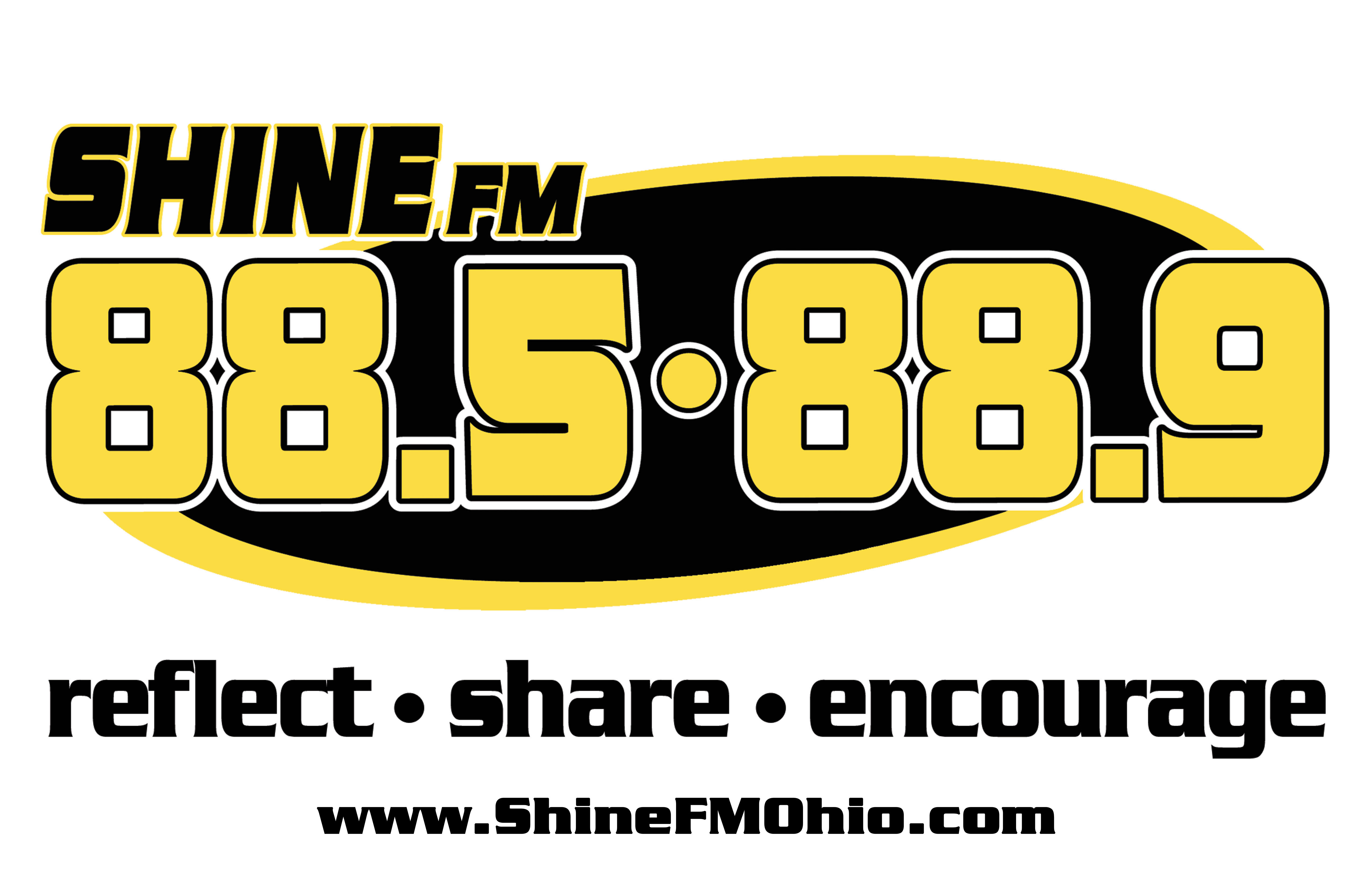
Former logo as Shine FM

On December 17, 2021, the station was rebranded as "Rise FM".

In 2024, Rise FM merged with River Radio Ministries.
