= WJEE =

Radio station in Bolivar, Ohio

Coordinates: 40°39′28″N 81°21′08″W

- Bolivar, Ohio; United States
- Broadcast area: Canton, Ohio
- Frequency: 90.1 MHz
- Branding: Rise FM

Programming
- Format: Christian

Ownership
- Owner: Soaring Eagle Promotions, Inc. dba Shine FM

Technical information
- Licensing authority: FCC
- Facility ID: 176212
- Class: A
- ERP: 6,000 watts
- HAAT: −10 meters (−33 ft)

Links
- Public license information: Public file; LMS
- Website: risefmohio.com

WJEE is a Christian radio station licensed to Bolivar, Ohio, broadcasting on 90.1 FM. WJEE serves the Canton, Ohio radio market.

== History ==
The station was originally owned by Denny and Marge Hazen Ministries, Inc., and was branded "Faith Ministry Radio". Co-owner Denny Hazen died in 2015. The station was originally part of a simulcast with 90.9 FM WJDD in Carrollton, Ohio. In 2020, WJDD was sold to Educational Media Foundation for $100,000, which surrendered the license. Effective March 5, 2021, WJEE was sold to Soaring Eagle Promotions, Inc. dba Shine FM, for $50,000.

On December 17, 2021, the station was rebranded as "Rise FM".

In 2024, Rise FM merged with River Radio Ministries.
