= WKXA-FM =

- Findlay, Ohio; United States
- Frequency: 100.5 MHz
- Branding: 100.5 KXA

Programming
- Format: Country

Ownership
- Owner: Blanchard River Broadcasting Company
- Sister stations: WFIN, WBUK

History
- First air date: 1948 (as WFIN-FM)
- Former call signs: WFIN-FM (1948–1975); WHMQ (1975–1989)

Technical information
- Licensing authority: FCC
- Facility ID: 5849
- Class: B
- ERP: 20,000 watts
- HAAT: 134 meters
- Transmitter coordinates: 40°55′0.00″N 83°35′45.00″W

Links
- Public license information: Public file; LMS
- Webcast: Listen Live
- Website: wkxa.com

WKXA-FM (100.5 FM) is a radio station licensed to Findlay, Ohio, United States. The station is currently owned by Blanchard River Broadcasting Company, a division of the Findlay Publishing Company.

== History ==
The station began as WFIN-FM and in 1975 changed to country-formatted WHMQ. In June 1989 the call letters became WKXA . Since the station adopted its current calls it has changed format several times, from CHR to Hot Adult Contemporary to Rock Adult Contemporary (as "Rockin' Hits 100.5") to the current classic hits sound.

On Friday February 10, 2012, WKXA announced that they will be switching back to their original country music format on Tuesday February 14, 2012. Their callsign became "Your Country Now, 100.5 WKXA"

WKXA is sometimes referred to on-air simply as "KXA".
