= WLRD =

- Willard, Ohio; United States
- Broadcast area: Mid-Ohio
- Frequency: 96.9 MHz
- Branding: WLRD 96.9

Programming
- Format: Southern Gospel
- Affiliations: Salem Radio Network

Ownership
- Owner: Christian Faith Broadcast, Inc.
- Sister stations: WGGN (FM)

History
- Former call signs: WHHA (1998–1998)
- Call sign meaning: W "LoRD", or "WilLaRD"

Technical information
- Licensing authority: FCC
- Facility ID: 81963
- Class: A
- ERP: 6,000 watts
- HAAT: 100.0 meters (328.1 ft)
- Transmitter coordinates: 40°57′36.00″N 82°37′16.00″W

Links
- Public license information: Public file; LMS
- Website: Official website

WLRD (96.9 FM) is a radio station broadcasting a Southern Gospel format. Licensed to Willard, Ohio, United States, the station serves the Mid-Ohio area. The station is currently owned by Christian Faith Broadcast, Inc.

== History ==
The station went on the air as WHHA on 1998-11-02. on 1998-12-28, the station changed its call sign to the current WLRD.
