= Al-Wast, Al-Bayda =

Al-Wast الوسط
- Sub-district
- Country: Yemen
- Governorate: Al Bayda
- District: Na'man

Population (2004)
  - Total: 960
- Time zone: UTC+3

Al-Wast (Arabic: الوسط) is a sub-district located in Na'man District, Al Bayda Governorate, Yemen. Al-Wast had a population of 960 according to the 2004 census.
