= WFIN =

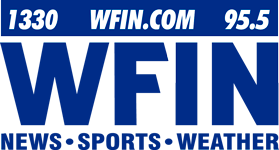
- Findlay, Ohio; United States
- Frequency: 1330 kHz
- Branding: 1330 95.5 WFIN

Programming
- Format: Talk radio with sports
- Affiliations: Agri Broadcast Network; CBS Sports Radio; Fox News Radio; Cleveland Guardians Radio Network; Ohio State Sports Network; Westwood One

Ownership
- Owner: Blanchard River Broadcasting Company
- Sister stations: WKXA-FM, WBUK

History
- First air date: December 15, 1941
- Call sign meaning: Findlay

Technical information
- Licensing authority: FCC
- Facility ID: 5848
- Class: D
- Power: 1,000 watts (day); 79 watts (night)
- Transmitter coordinates: 41°0′30.00″N 83°38′7.00″W
- Translator: 95.5 W238CX (Findlay)

Links
- Public license information: Public file; LMS
- Webcast: Listen live
- Website: wfin.com

WFIN (1330 AM) is a commercial radio station licensed to Findlay, Ohio, United States, featuring a mixed talk and sports format. The station is currently owned by Blanchard River Broadcasting Company, which is owned by The Findlay Publishing Company. WFIN is also relayed full-time over low-power FM translator W238CX (93.5 FM).

== History ==
WFIN first went on the air December 15, 1941, under the ownership of Findlay Radio Company, headed by Cloyce W. Oxley, who also served as the station's general manager. Studios and offices were located at 500 1/2 South Main Street in downtown Findlay. The station operated at its current frequency and daytime power, but with no nighttime authorization.

In September 1949, WFIN was sold to Findlay Publishing Company. R.L. Heminger was the company president, and Harold Heminger was named general manager. In 1957, studios and offices were moved to the second floor of 101 West Sandusky Street.

In late 1987, the FCC granted limited nighttime power parameters for Class III Regional stations, including WFIN. The following year, WFIN began broadcasting with nighttime power of 79 watts, as it continues to do today.

Studios and offices were moved in 1993 to a new, state of the art facility on Lake Cascades Parkway in Findlay. Concurrent with the studio move was the formation of Blanchard River Broadcasting Company, the new licensee set up as a subsidiary company of Findlay Publishing Company. WFIN and its sister stations remain there today.

== FM Translator ==
WFIN also has an FM translator, W238CX, to extend the coverage of the main AM station; it also provides the listener the ability to listen on the FM band, providing high fidelity stereophonic sound.

Broadcast translator for WFIN
Call sign	Frequency	City of license	FID	ERP (W)	Class	FCC info
W238CX	95.5 FM	Findlay, Ohio	201116	250	D	LMS

== Programming ==
WFIN airs a mix of news/talk and sports talk programming. Westwood One Sports airs in the evening and overnight hours during the week, and the bulk of the day on weekends.
