= WAST (Ohio) =

Daytime-only radio station in Ashtabula, Ohio

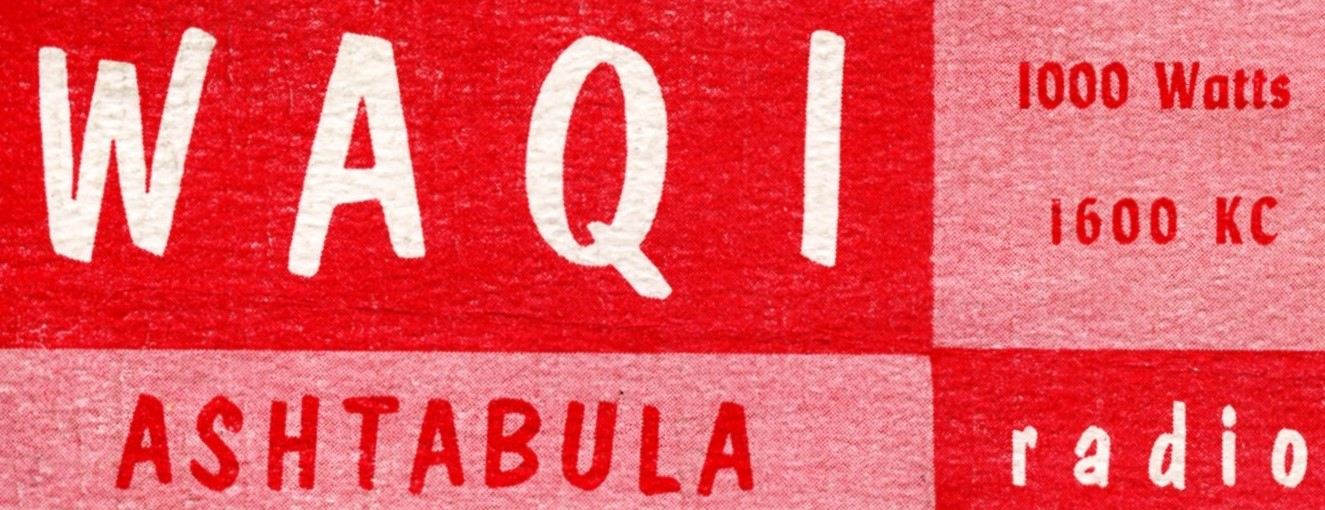
- Ashtabula, Ohio; United States
- Broadcast area: Northeast Ohio (limited)
- Frequency: 1600 kHz
- Branding: Wacky Radio 1600

Ownership
- Owner: Quests Inc.
- Sister stations: WELW

History
- First air date: February 6, 1964
- Last air date: October 1, 1982
- Former call signs: WAQI (1964–1982)
- Call sign meaning: Disambiguation of "Wacky"

Technical information
- Facility ID: 54256
- Class: D
- Power: 1,000 watts (daytime only)
- Transmitter coordinates: 41°51′17.6″N 80°49′51.6″W

WAST was a commercial daytime-only radio station licensed to Ashtabula, Ohio, at 1600 AM, serving parts of Northeast Ohio and Northwest Pennsylvania. The station broadcast from 1964 to 1982 with the WAQI callsign.

== History ==
=== WAQI ===
What ended up becoming WAST first went on the air on February 6, 1964, as WAQI, founded by James B. Denton in the late 1950s. Denton applied for the construction permit in December 1959. The Federal Communications Commission (FCC) granted the construction permit in April 1962.

The station broadcast at 1,000 watts during daytime hours only using a two-tower directional antenna with majority of the signal going east and west, from its studio and transmitter facility at the intersection of North Bend Road and Ketchum Avenue in Ashtabula. WAQI fell silent on October 1, 1982, when the FCC license expired.

=== WAST ===
Although 1600 never returned to the air, it was licensed again on May 21, 1984, under the call sign WAST The license for WAST expired on June 7, 1991, and has since been deleted by the FCC. FCC rules now prohibit the re-licensing of daytime stations, so the station is gone forever. The original transmitter/studio building and the north tower still stand on North Bend Road in Ashtabula.

== Photos ==
WAQI/WAST Studio and Transmitter Site
July 1967	August 1991	December 2014
