= WJEH (AM) =

Gallipolis, Ohio; United States
- Frequency: 990 kHz
- Branding: Joy 990

Programming
- Format: Defunct (was Southern gospel)

Ownership
- Owner: Thomas L. Susman; (Vandalia Media Partners 2, LLC)

History
- First air date: 1990
- Former call signs: WJEH (1950–1990); WGTR (1990)
- Call sign meaning: John E. Halliday (original owner)

Technical information
- Facility ID: 70692
- Class: D
- Power: 1,000 watts day 250 watts critical hours 16 watts night
- Transmitter coordinates: 38°48′20″N 82°13′23″W

WJEH (990 AM) was a radio station licensed to Gallipolis, Ohio. Last owned by Thomas Susman, through licensee Vandalia Media Partners 2, LLC, it broadcast a Christian music format dedicated to the Southern gospel.

== History ==
The station was originally licensed on July 3, 1950 with the call sign WJEH. The station changed its call sign to WGTR on June 4, 1990, and back to WJEH on June 30, 1990.

Its license was cancelled by the Federal Communications Commission on May 20, 2021.
