= WZCP =

- Chillicothe, Ohio; United States
- Frequency: 89.3 MHz
- Branding: 89.3 The River

Ownership
- Owner: Christian Voice of Central Ohio
- Sister stations: WCVO, WFCO, WZNP, WZWP

History
- First air date: April 27, 1988
- Former call signs: WXUC (1987–1988); WVXC (1988–2007)

Technical information
- Licensing authority: FCC
- Facility ID: 74298
- Class: A
- ERP: 2,100 watts
- HAAT: 107.0 meters
- Transmitter coordinates: 39°20′45″N 83°11′15″W

Links
- Public license information: Public file; LMS
- Webcast: Listen Live
- Website: WZCP website

WZCP is an American non-commercial FM radio station located in Chillicothe, Ohio, and operates on the assigned frequency of 89.3 MHz. As of 2007, WZCP identifies itself on the air as "89.3 The River".

The station previously had the call sign of WVXC-FM and was owned by Cincinnati Classical Public Radio. Three repeater stations (including WVXC) were sold to Christian Voice of Central Ohio in 2007 because of the small population and lack of a revenue stream from the outlying communities and to pay off the debt incurred by the purchase of 7 stations in 2005 from Xavier University for $15 million.
