= WZNP =

- Newark, Ohio; United States
- Broadcast area: Newark/Zanesville
- Frequency: 89.3
- Branding: 89.3 The River

Programming
- Format: CCM

Ownership
- Owner: River Radio Ministries
- Sister stations: WCVOWFCO; WZCP

History
- First air date: March 24, 2008
- Call sign meaning: Zanesville Newark Promise

Technical information
- Licensing authority: FCC
- Facility ID: 89343
- Class: A
- ERP: 5,500 watts
- HAAT: 99 meters
- Transmitter coordinates: 39°58′46.00″N 82°12′40.00″W

Links
- Public license information: Public file; LMS
- Webcast: Listen Live
- Website: WZNP website

WZNP is a non-commercial FM radio station located in Newark, Ohio, and operates on the assigned frequency of 89.3 MHz.

The station was established as the replacement for South Zanesville-licensed station WCVZ, which was sold by the Christian Voice of Central Ohio in 2008 to become the new home for WHIZ-FM. WZNP is part of the "River Radio Network", along with WFCO and WZCP.
