= WNXT-FM =

Coordinates: 38.723°N 82.999°W

- Portsmouth, Ohio; United States
- Frequency: 99.3 MHz
- Branding: Mix 99.3

Programming
- Format: Hot adult contemporary

Ownership
- Owner: Total Media Group Inc.
- Sister stations: WNXT, WZZZ

History
- First air date: September 15, 1965

Technical information
- Licensing authority: FCC
- Facility ID: 62329
- Class: A
- ERP: 2,550 watts
- HAAT: 156 meters

Links
- Public license information: Public file; LMS

WNXT-FM broadcasts on FM in the Portsmouth, Ohio, area at 99.3 MHz. WNXT-FM broadcasts contain a mixture of contemporary pop music from the 1970s through today.
