= WLTP (AM) =

Radio station in Marietta, Ohio

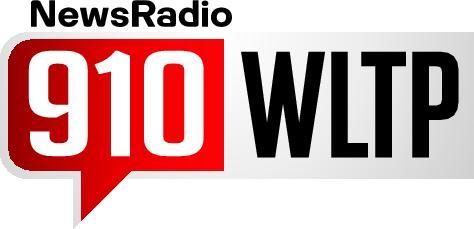
- Marietta, Ohio; United States
- Broadcast area: Parkersburg–Marietta
- Frequency: 910 kHz
- Branding: NewsRadio 910 WLTP

Programming
- Format: Talk radio
- Affiliations: Fox News Radio; Compass Media Networks; Premiere Networks

Ownership
- Owner: iHeartMedia, Inc.; (iHM Licenses, LLC)
- Sister stations: WDMX, WNUS, WRVB

History
- First air date: August 4, 1964
- Former call signs: WBRJ (1964–1995); WYLI (1995–2001); WBRJ (2001–2004)

Technical information
- Licensing authority: FCC
- Facility ID: 55182
- Class: D
- Power: 5,000 watts (day); 40 watts (night)
- Transmitter coordinates: 39°21′48″N 81°30′10″W (day); 39°17′23″N 81°31′36″W (night)

Links
- Public license information: Public file; LMS
- Webcast: Listen Live
- Website: newsradio910wltp.iheart.com

WLTP (910 kHz) is an AM radio station broadcasting a news/talk format. Licensed to Marietta, Ohio, United States, it serves the Parkersburg–Marietta area. The station is owned by iHeartMedia, Inc.

== History ==
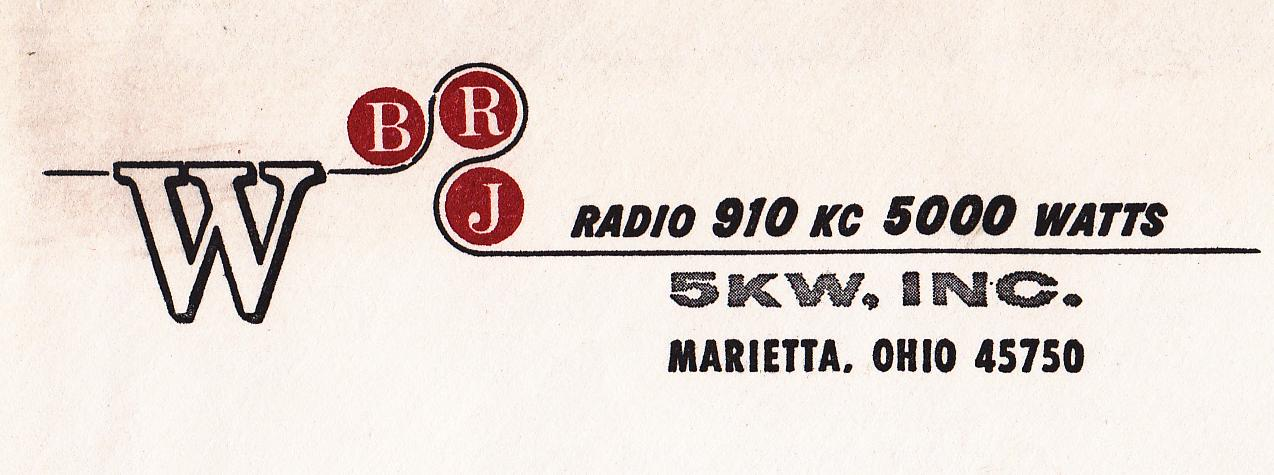
WBRJ (AM) Logo Circa 1973

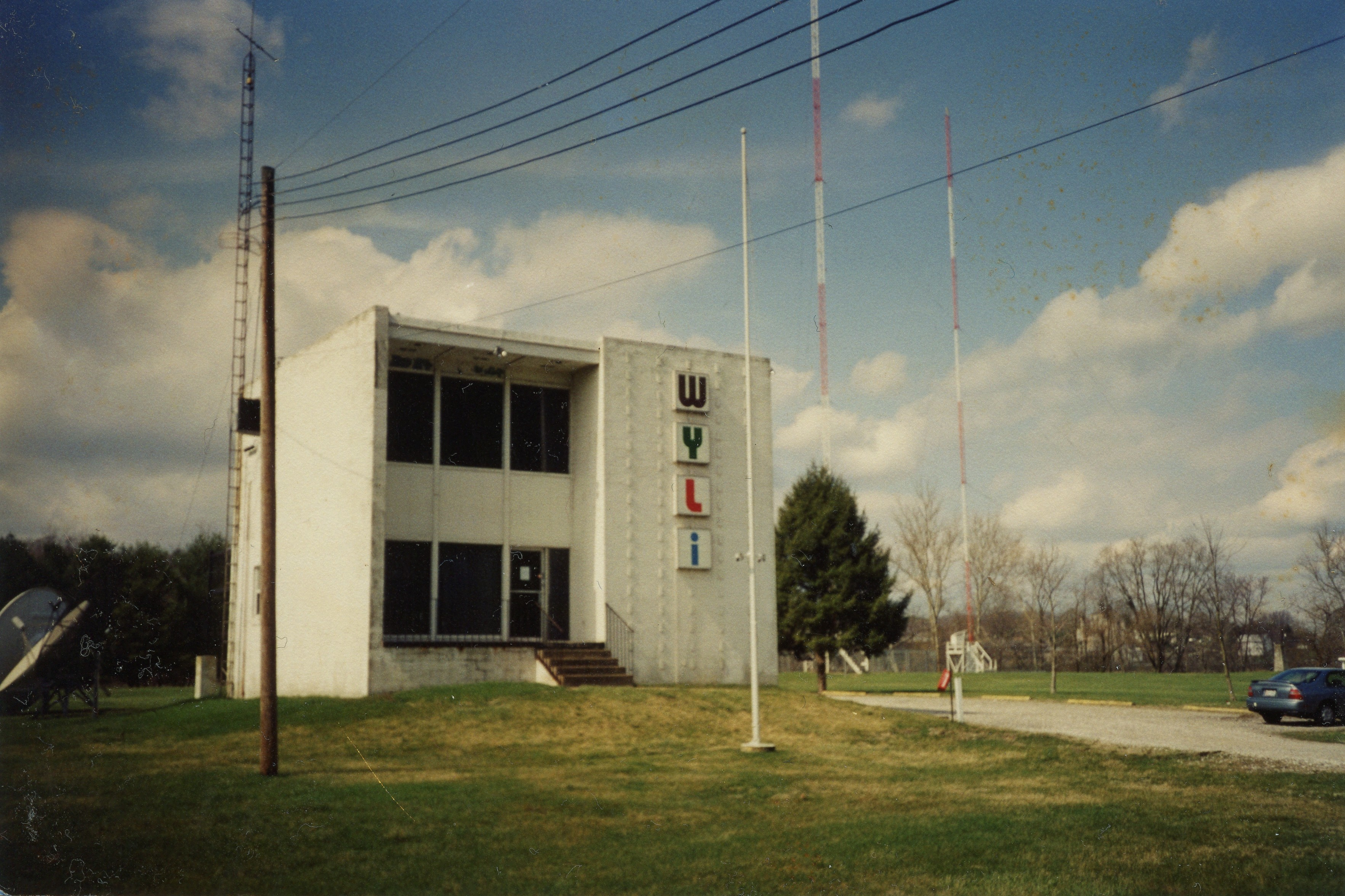
Former Transmitter Site at 233 Pennsylvania Ave, Marietta, OH Circa 1995

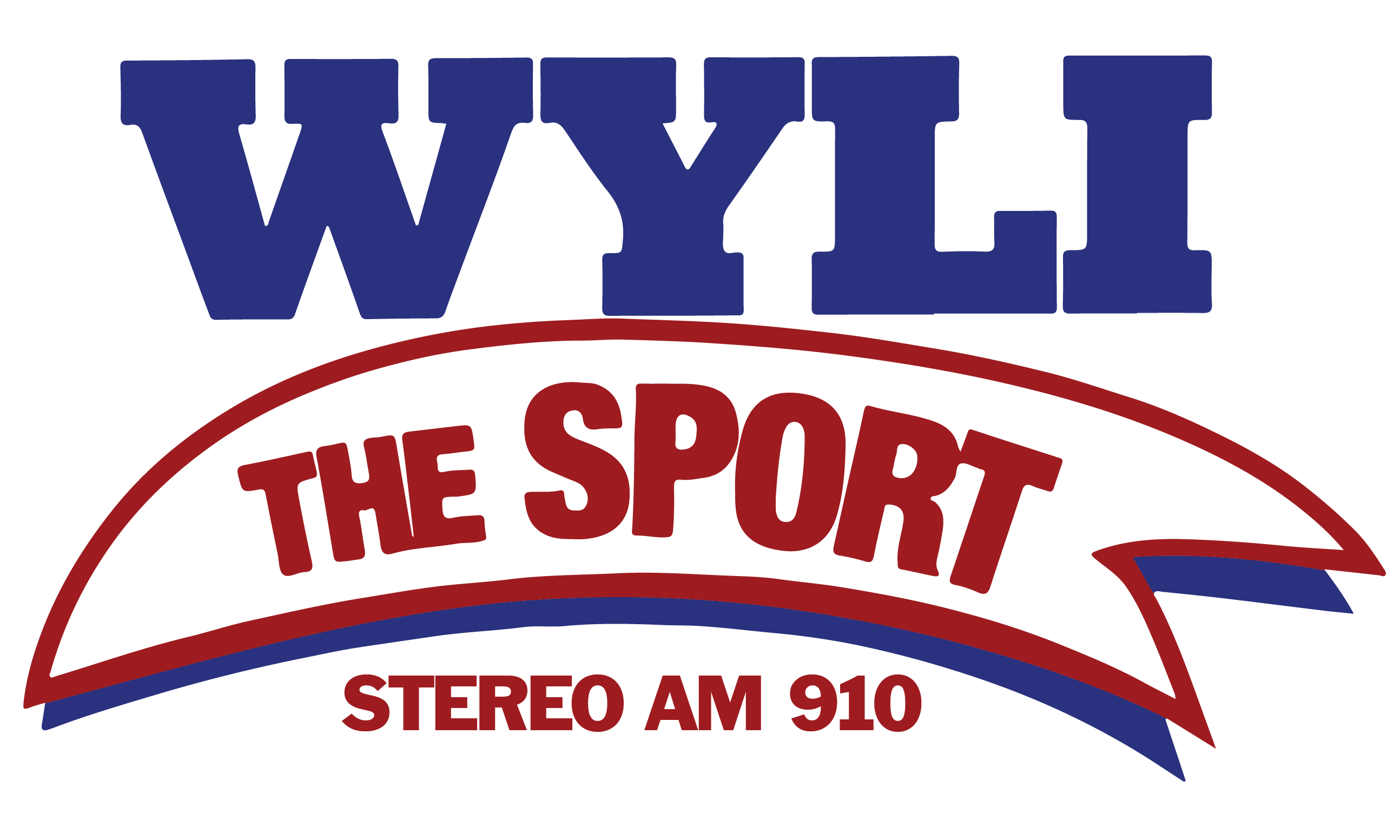
Logo From 1998 to 2000

The station began broadcasting August 4, 1964, and originally held the call sign WBRJ. In 1967, the station adopted a country music format. By 1980, the station was airing a MOR format. By 1989, the station was again airing a country music format. By 1991, the station had adopted a news-talk format.

In January 1995, the station's call sign was changed to WYLI, and by March 1995, the station had been taken silent. In summer of 1996, the station returned to the air, broadcasting a CHR format and carrying Imus in the Morning. In early 1998, the station was again taken silent. In September of that year WYLI was purchased by WRCM Ltd. Under the direction of former WKNR (1220) broadcasters Todd Bartley and Jim Pogras the station returned to the air with an oldies format before transitioning to a locally based All Sports format as "AM Stereo 910 The Sport" that aggressively covered local sports, news, and had popular locally-hosted sports talk shows that rewarded fans who joined the "locker room.". In early 2000, the station was again taken silent. The station's former studio and tower location in Marietta was torn down to make room for a community water park. The towers were moved about eight miles southwest to Boaz, West Virginia.

In 2001, the station's call sign was changed back to WBRJ, and the station returned to the air, continuing to air a sports format. In 2004, the station's call sign was changed to WLTP, and it adopted a talk format.
