= WYPC =

- Wellston, Ohio; United States
- Frequency: 1330 kHz
- Branding: 105.3 WYPC

Programming
- Format: Oldies
- Affiliations: Fox News Radio

Ownership
- Owner: Total Media Group
- Sister stations: WKOV-FM, WCJO

History
- First air date: 1953
- Former call signs: WKOV (1952–1991); WJTD (1998)

Technical information
- Licensing authority: FCC
- Facility ID: 29689
- Class: D
- Power: 500 watts (day); 50 watts (night)
- Transmitter coordinates: 39°6′22.3″N 82°34′43.6″W
- Translator: 105.3 W287CZ (Jackson)

Links
- Public license information: Public file; LMS
- Webcast: Listen Live
- Website: WYPC Online

WYPC (1330 AM) is a radio station broadcasting an oldies format. Licensed to Wellston, Ohio, United States. The station serves the Wellston/Jackson area, is currently owned by Total Media Group, Inc., the owner of the station since 1970, and features programming from Fox News Radio.

== History ==
The station went on the air in 1953, as WKOV at 1570 kilohertz. The station moved to 1330 kHz by 1958. An FM station, WKOV-FM, was added in 1971. WKOV-AM featured a full-service adult contemporary/MOR format until 1991, when the call letters changed to WYPC-AM, and the station switched to country music, with the AC format moving to WKOV-FM (which had programmed beautiful music). WYPC-AM adopted an adult standards music format in the mid-1990s. WYPC-AM changed its format from Adult Standards to Sports Talk in August 2012. In July 2026, WYPC-AM (and it's FM translator, 105.3 FM) changed formats, switching from Sports Talk to an Oldies format called "Southern Ohio Gold", with music from the 1950s to the 1980s.
