= WNXT (AM) =

- Portsmouth, Ohio; United States
- Frequency: 1260 kHz
- Branding: Fox Sports Radio 1260

Programming
- Format: Sports
- Affiliations: ABC Radio; Fox Sports Radio; Ohio State Sports Network

Ownership
- Owner: Total Media Group Inc.
- Sister stations: WNXT-FM, WZZZ

History
- First air date: 1951

Technical information
- Licensing authority: FCC
- Facility ID: 62328
- Class: D
- Power: 250 watts day
- Transmitter coordinates: 38°48′38.30″N 82°59′20.60″W
- Translator: 95.7 W239CQ (Portsmouth)

Links
- Public license information: Public file; LMS
- Webcast: Listen live
- Website: wnxtradio.com

WNXT (1260 AM) is a radio station broadcasting a sports format. Licensed to Portsmouth, Ohio, United States, the station is currently owned by Total Meda Group Inc. and features programming from ABC Radio and Fox Sports Radio.

== History ==
WNXT went on the air in 1951. The history began when the original owner of WSAZ radio left to start a radio station in Portsmouth after WSAZ, as a radio station, became defunct.

On December 24, 2025, the 4 masts were demolished, signalling the end of broadcasting.

WNXT-AM resumed broadcast operations from a new transmitter site in South Portsmouth, KY, on December 31, 2025.

== Today's format ==
Today much of WNXT is dominated by Fox Sports Radio and local sports. The station dumped much of its country music in 2004 for ESPN Radio. The station has a major variety of both local and professional sports. Mark Williams and Chuck Greenslate are some of the local sports personalities. During the fall and winter, both Williams and Greenslate do the local sports show, the Saturday Morning Sports-line, talking to local coaches via telephone line. WNXT is also an affiliate for Cincinnati Reds baseball, Ohio State University football and basketball and Columbus Blue Jackets hockey.

== Community Corner ==
Local personality Bill Shope hosts the Community Corner show on weekdays from 8:00am to 9:00am.
