= WPKO-FM =

- Bellefontaine, Ohio; United States
- Broadcast area: Bellefontaine, Ohio
- Frequency: 98.3 MHz (HD Radio)
- Branding: Mix 98.3

Programming
- Format: Hot adult contemporary
- Subchannels: HD2: Classic rock "107.3 The Drive"
- Affiliations: Ohio State Sports Network; Premiere Networks

Ownership
- Owner: V-Teck Communications

History
- First air date: June 1, 1969 (as WOGM)
- Former call signs: WOGM (1969–1978); WTOO-FM (1978–1988)
- Call sign meaning: PeaK of Ohio

Technical information
- Licensing authority: FCC
- Facility ID: 69626
- Class: A
- ERP: 1,750 watts
- HAAT: 131 meters (430 ft)
- Transmitter coordinates: 40.368°N 83.734°W
- Translator: HD2: 107.3 W297BP (Bellefontaine)

Links
- Public license information: Public file; LMS
- Webcast: Listen live HD2: Listen live
- Website: www.peakofohio.com

WPKO-FM (98.3 FM) is an American radio station in Bellefontaine, Ohio. It is programmed in a hot adult contemporary radio format, and is almost entirely locally produced. The station is owned by V-Teck Communications, and is the sister station to WBLL 1390 AM.

== History ==
WPKO originally signed on the air on June 1, 1969, with the call letters WOGM (for "Ohio's Good Music") before switching to WTOO-FM with a contemporary hit format on June 1, 1978, as "Stereo Too 98" . The station became WPKO-FM on February 19, 1988. For a time, the -FM suffix was required as part of the call letters to differentiate the station from its AM sister station, now known as WBLL. While this remains the station's official call letters, the station now is commonly known as WPKO.

On January 6, 2005, a major ice storm caused a loss of power to the broadcast facilities. As a result, WPKO was knocked off the air for several hours. V-Teck Communications has recently obtained emergency power generators to ensure this does not happen again.
