= WKCO =

Radio station at Kenyon College in Gambier, Ohio

- Gambier, Ohio; United States
- Frequency: 91.9 MHz

Programming
- Format: College Radio/Freeform radio

Ownership
- Owner: Kenyon College

History
- Call sign meaning: Kenyon College

Technical information
- Licensing authority: FCC
- Facility ID: 34261
- Class: A
- ERP: 265 watts
- HAAT: 58.0 meters
- Transmitter coordinates: 40°22′25.00″N 82°23′45.00″W

Links
- Public license information: Public file; LMS
- Webcast: Listen Live
- Website: WKCO homepage

WKCO (91.9 FM) is a freeform radio station licensed to Gambier, Ohio, United States, the station serves Kenyon College. The station is owned by Kenyon College.

== History ==
The first Kenyon College radio station, WKCO, was conceived and built in 1947 by returning war veterans who used their knowledge to plan and build all of the equipment themselves. The original transmitter was replaced in 1961 when Jonathan Katz (’62) designed and built an AM transmitter which was replaced two or three years later by a small commercial unit. In 1972, WKCO moved to a 10-watt FM broadcast. After the Federal Communications Commission (FCC) abolished 10-Watt FM stations, WKCO upped its wattage to 100 watts. At that same time, WKCO expanded its operations in Farr Hall and began broadcasting seven days a week. With the addition of UPI wire services, WKCO began hourly news broadcasts and added a half-hour Sunday evening news program. The station's format was mostly rock, some classical music and regular news broadcasts. The transition from the carrier current station to FM broadcasting was overseen by station manager Greg Widin (’74) whose work made the FM application and launch successful. The expansion of the station's program schedule was initiated by station manager John Boffa Jr. ('76). The 1970s represented a period of significant growth at the station once the FM broadcast capability expanded its listener range to as far as Mount Vernon, the nearest town larger than Gambier, where Kenyon is located. Internet streaming broadcasts were added in the early 2000s and are currently available via the station's website.
