= WBLL =

Radio station in Bellefontaine, Ohio

- Bellefontaine, Ohio; United States
- Frequency: 1390 kHz
- Branding: 106.9 The Bull

Programming
- Format: Country music
- Affiliations: Cleveland Guardians Radio Network; Ohio State Sports Network

Ownership
- Owner: V-Teck Communications

History
- First air date: February 14, 1951
- Former call signs: WOHP (1951–1969); WTOO (1969–1981); WTCY (1981–1983); WOHP (1983–1988); WPKO (1988–1989)
- Call sign meaning: W Bellefontaine

Technical information
- Licensing authority: FCC
- Facility ID: 69627
- Class: D
- Power: 500 watts (day); 81 watts (night)
- Translator: 106.9 W295CI (Urbana)

Links
- Public license information: Public file; LMS
- Webcast: Listen live
- Website: www.peakofohio.com

WBLL (1390 AM) is an American radio station in Bellefontaine, Ohio. It currently broadcasts with country music programming, along with certain sporting events (Cleveland Guardians baseball, local high school sports). The station is owned by V-Teck Communications, and is the sister station of WPKO 98.3 FM.

== History ==
WBLL originally signed on the air in 1951 with the call letters WOHP (for "Ohio's Highest Point"). It was the first radio station licensed to Bellefontaine since station WHBD relocated to Mount Orab, Ohio in 1929 (later known as WPAY in Portsmouth, Ohio).

In the late 1960s, the station's callsign changed to WTOO (for "Top Of Ohio"), in 1981 to WTCY (for "Top (of Ohio) CountrY"), and then switched back to the WOHP calls on February 14, 1983, with a gospel format. On February 19, 1988, the station became WPKO, in recognition of its sister station, WPKO-FM. The call letters became WBLL on May 12, 1989.

Joe Rockhold was a disk jockey at WOHP in the 1950s where he launched his broadcasting career. Shortly before the decade was over he became a staff announcer (and eventually became best known as children's show host "Uncle Orrie")at Dayton's WHIO-TV where he remained until his retirement in 1969. Rockhold however remained active in broadcasting throughout his retirement at WSRW (AM) in Hillsboro, Ohio before his death in 1981.

On January 28, 2004, V-Teck Communications applied for a construction permit for a transmitter in Grandview Heights, Ohio. This transmitter would be well within the Columbus metropolitan area. The FCC acknowledged the CP request on November 17, 2004, and further acknowledged an application for a major modification to a licensed facility on January 21, 2005. This may indicate plans by V-Teck to effectively move the station from Bellefontaine to the Grandview Heights-Columbus area.

While the license location for the newest application is in Grandview Heights, the major modification request is for 39°53′39″N 83°05′30″W, placing the new transmitter (if built) near Grove City, Ohio. This is southwest of Columbus; Bellefontaine and the present transmitter are to the northwest of Columbus.

For a brief time in the mid-1970s, WTOO set trends by breaking several songs before the major stations in Cincinnati, Columbus and Cleveland. This was under the management of Program and Music Director David Mark early in his career. Mark eventually became one of the country's major voice-over announcers and, beginning in the 1990s and well into the 2000s, was the promotional voice of Fox TV network stations and many UPN TV network stations across the country.

The WOHP callsign was later used at an FM station in Portsmouth, Ohio as a repeater of the former WCDR "The Path" (now WKCD) in Cedarville, Ohio which is now WSGR, formerly part of the Contemporary Christian K-LOVE network.

The WOHP callsign is now being used at a low-power FM station in Huntsville, Ohio.

The WTCY callsign is now used by a Catholic FM station in Traverse City, Michigan.

On January 3, 2018, WBLL flipped from its talk format to country music as "106.9 The Bull".

== AM 1390 timeline ==
WBLL has had several ownerships over the decades

- 1950s- Founded in 1951 by C.H. Chaimberlain, (later acquired by Lake Erie Radio and TV Inc.) as WOHP.
- 1960s- Purchased in 1961 by Hi-Point Broadcasting.
- Early 1970s- Purchased by WOHP Inc. Callsign switched to WTOO in 1969. FM sister WOGM (98.1 mHz is founded in 1969)
- Mid 1970s-early 80s- Purchased by Triplett Broadcasting. WOGM becomes WTOO-FM by 1976. WTOO-AM becomes WTCY in 1981. AM callsign reverts to WOHP in 1983.
- Late 1980s-present- Purchased by V-Teck Communications, Callsign switched to WPKO-AM in 1988 and again in 1989 to the current WBLL.

(source: Broadcasting Magazine yearbooks)
