= WLOH =

Radio station in Lancaster, Ohio

- Lancaster, Ohio; United States
- Broadcast area: Fairfield County; Hocking County; Perry County
- Frequency: 1320 kHz
- Branding: Wolf Country Radio

Programming
- Format: Country
- Affiliations: Compass Media Networks; United Stations Radio Networks; Cincinnati Bengals Radio Network; Ohio State Sports Network

Ownership
- Owner: WLOH Radio Company

History
- First air date: October 9, 1948; 77 years ago
- Former call signs: WHOK (1948–81)
- Call sign meaning: Lancaster, Ohio

Technical information
- Licensing authority: FCC
- Facility ID: 73217
- Class: D
- Power: 500 watts (day); 16 watts (night)
- Transmitter coordinates: 39°42′22″N 82°32′43″W
- Translators: 99.3 W257EQ (Logan); 102.9 W275CT (Somerset); 104.5 W283BO (Lancaster)

Links
- Public license information: Public file; LMS
- Webcast: Listen Live
- Website: wolfohio.com

WLOH (1320 AM) is a commercial radio station licensed to Lancaster, Ohio, United States, and features a country format known as "Wolf Country Radio". Owned by the WLOH Radio Company, WLOH also serves as a local affiliate for the Cincinnati Bengals Radio Network and the Ohio State Sports Network. WLOH's transmitter is located in Berne Township. The station extends its range over a series of low-power FM translators including W283BO (104.5 FM) in Lancaster, W275CT (102.9 FM) in Somerset, and W257EQ (99.3 FM) in Logan. In addition to a standard analog transmission, WLOK is available online.

== History ==
The station signed on the air on October 9, 1948, the first broadcasting station in Lancaster. Its original call sign was WHOK, which stood for its owner, the Hocking Valley Broadcasting Company. WHOK was a daytimer, broadcasting at 500 watts and required to go off the air at sunset. Dr. Nelson Embrey was the General Manager and the studios were on Memorial Drive.

In 1958, it added an FM station, WHOK-FM at 95.5 MHz. (The FM station was later sold and is today Urban AC outlet WXMG.) By the 1970s, WHOK was airing a full service, middle of the road format of popular adult music, news and sports, while the FM station had an authomated country music sound. WHOK 1320 AM changed its call letters to WLOH in 1981, while the FM station kept the WHOK-FM call sign.

In 2001, WLOH was acquired by Frontier Broadcasting for $325,000. The station changed to a country music format on January 30, 2015.

== Translators ==
Broadcast translators for WLOH
Call sign	Frequency	City of license	FID	ERP (W)	HAAT	Class	Transmitter coordinates	FCC info
W257EQ	99.3 FM	Logan, Ohio	142494	250	24.8 m (81 ft)	D	39º31'44"N,82º27'13"W	LMS
W275CT	102.9 FM	Somerset, Ohio	200945	250	61 m (200 ft)	D	39º43'43.7'N, 82º13'23.5"W	LMS
W283BO	104.5 FM	Lancaster, Ohio	153192	250	24.4 m (80 ft)	D	39º42'13'N, 82º33'13"W	LMS

== Former on-air staff ==
Stan Robinson was recipient of the Russell W. Alt Award for his 43+ years of promoting county fairs in Ohio. Each year he'd broadcast from The Fairfield County Fair and he hosted The Stan Robinson @ RJ Pitcher Inn.
