= WFCO =

Coordinates: 39°40′49″N 82°35′51″W

- Lancaster, Ohio; United States
- Broadcast area: Fairfield County, Ohio
- Frequency: 90.9 MHz
- Branding: 90.9 The River

Programming
- Format: Contemporary Christian

Ownership
- Owner: River Radio Ministries

History
- First air date: 1988
- Call sign meaning: Fairfield's Christian Outreach

Technical information
- Licensing authority: FCC
- Facility ID: 36478
- Class: A
- ERP: 2,500 watts
- HAAT: 78 meters (256 ft)

Links
- Public license information: Public file; LMS
- Webcast: Listen live
- Website: riverradio.com

WFCO is a contemporary Christian radio station licensed to Lancaster, Ohio, broadcasting on 90.9 FM, and is owned by River Radio Ministries.

WFCO currently airs a variety of contemporary Christian music from the mid-2000s to today. Previously, the station aired classic Christian music from the 1970s, '80s, and '90s, and also aired Christian Talk and Teaching programs.

WFCO began broadcasting in 1988, and initially operated only 12 hours a day, running 200 watts. WFCO was originally owned by Fairfield Christian Academy, and the station was known as "Fairfield's Christian Outreach". WFCO began 24-hour operations in the early 1990s.

In 2002, WFCO moved to downtown Lancaster, added more local and musical programming and became known as "Peaceful 90.9 FM". In 2006, WFCO increased its power to 1,200 watts. In 2007, WFCO adopted the branding "Refreshing 90.9 FM". In 2013, the station began a more uniform schedule where most talk programs were in the morning hours and music was played in the afternoon and evening hours. One exception to this was WFCO's public affairs show Community Accent that aired live in the morning and replayed in the evening. The station also broadcast a variety of high school sports from area schools. This included everything from basketball, baseball, football, soccer, softball, volleyball to even one track meet a year.

On November 1, 2019, River Radio Ministries announced the acquisition of WFCO from Lancaster Educational Broadcasting Foundation. The station was converted to River Radio's contemporary Christian "The River" format. The sale, at a price of $235,000, was consummated on February 4, 2020.
