= Mass media in Columbus, Ohio =

Columbus, Ohio is served by several newspapers, magazines, and television and radio stations.

== Newspapers and magazines ==
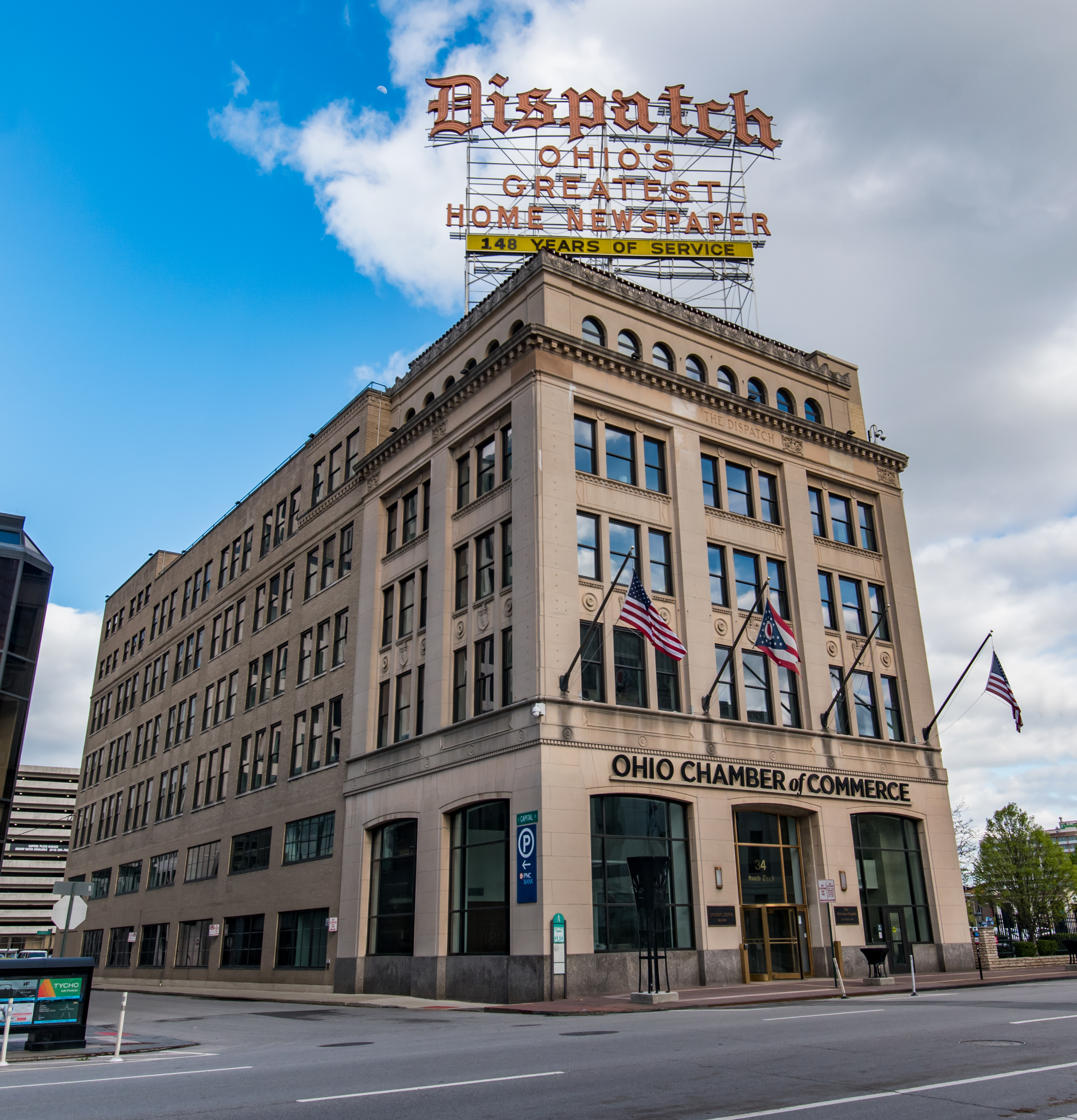
The Columbus Dispatch building

Several weekly and daily newspapers serve Columbus and Central Ohio. The major daily newspaper in Columbus is The Columbus Dispatch; its erstwhile main competitor, The Columbus Citizen-Journal, ceased publication on December 31, 1985. There are also neighborhood/suburb specific papers, such as the Dispatch Printing Company's ThisWeek Community News, which serves 23 suburbs and Columbus, the Columbus Messenger, and the independently owned Short North Gazette. The Lantern and UWeekly serve the Ohio State University community. "Alternative" arts/culture/politics-oriented papers include Outlook Media's Outlook: Columbus (serving the city's LGBT community), and aLIVE (formerly the independent Columbus Alive and now owned by the Columbus Dispatch). The newest addition to the Columbus media scene is Live Local! Columbus, a free, quarterly magazine that focuses on local arts, culture, and events.

The Columbus Magazine, CityScene, (614) Magazine, and Columbus Monthly are the city's magazines. Online media publication Columbus Underground also serves the Columbus region as an independently owned alternative voice. The Confluence Cast, a Columbus-centric podcast hosted by Tim Fulton, is presented by Columbus Underground and focuses on the civics, lifestyle, entertainment, and people of the city.

The city's business community is served by The Daily Reporter, central Ohio's only printed daily business and legal newspaper; Columbus Business First, a daily online/weekly print business publication that is part of the Charlotte-based American City Business Journals, and Columbus CEO, a monthly business magazine. Gongwer News Service, a daily independent political newsletter, provides extensive Statehouse coverage.

== Television ==
Columbus is the base for 11 television stations and is the 32nd largest television market as of October 27, 2022.

=== Full power ===
- 4 WCMH-TV Columbus (NBC)
- 6 WSYX Columbus (.1 ABC, .2 MyNetworkTV, .3 Fox)
- 10 WBNS-TV Columbus (CBS)
- 28 WTTE Columbus (Roar)
- 34 WOSU-TV Columbus (PBS)
- 51 WSFJ-TV London (Bounce TV)
- 53 WWHO Chillicothe (The CW)

=== Low-power ===
- 17 WDEM-CD Columbus (Rock Entertainment Sports Network)
- 19 WCLL-CD Columbus (Daystar)
- 22 WCBZ-CD Columbus (Cozi TV)
- 23 WQMC-LD Columbus (.1 Independent, .2 Telemundo)
- 29 WOOH-LD Zanesville
- 32 WCSN-LD Columbus
- 39 WGCT-CD Columbus (TCT)

Warner Cable introduced its two-way interactive QUBE system in Columbus in December 1977, which consisted of specialty channels that would evolve into national networks Nickelodeon, MTV and The Movie Channel. QUBE also displayed one of the earliest uses of Pay-per-view and video on demand.

== Radio ==
Columbus is home to the 36th largest radio market. The following box contains all of the radio stations in the area, as well as their current format:

=== AM ===
- 610 WTVN Columbus (Talk)
- 820 WVSG Columbus (Catholic/EWTN)**
- 880 WRFD Worthington (Christian) (Note: Daytime-only station)
- 920 WMNI Columbus (Sports/Fox)
- 1230 WYTS Columbus (Black Information Network)
- 1270 WDLR Marysville (Adult contemporary)
- 1460 WBNS Columbus (Sports/ESPN)
- 1550 WQCD Delaware (Regional Mexican; WXGT simulcast)
- 1580 WXGT Columbus (Regional Mexican)

=== FM ===
- 88.1 WWGV Grove City (American Family Radio)**
- 88.7 WUFM Columbus (Christian rock)**
- 89.7 WOSU-FM Columbus (NPR)**
- 90.5 WCBE Columbus (NPR)**
- 91.5 WHKC Columbus (Christian contemporary)**
- 92.3 WCOL-FM Columbus (Country)
- 93.3 WODC Ashville (Adult hits)
- 94.7 WSNY Columbus (Adult contemporary)
- 95.5 WXMG Lancaster (Urban adult contemporary)
- 96.3 WLVQ Columbus (Classic rock)
- 97.1 WBNS-FM Columbus (Sports/ESPN)
- 97.5 WOBN Westerville (College; Otterbein University)**
- 97.9 WNCI Columbus (Contemporary hits)
- 98.9 WTOH Upper Arlington (Conservative talk)
- 99.7 WRKZ Columbus (Active rock)
- 100.3 WCLT-FM Newark (Country)
- 101.1 WOSA Grove City (Classical)**
- 101.7 WNKO New Albany (Classic hits)
- 102.5 WKVR Baltimore (K-Love)**
- 103.1 WWLA Johnstown (Spanish adult contemporary)
- 103.5 WNND Pickerington (Classic hits)
- 103.9 WJKR Worthington (Country)
- 104.3 WNNP Richwood (Classic hits; WNND simulcast)
- 104.9 WCVO Gahanna (Christian contemporary)**
- 105.7 WXZX Hilliard (Alternative rock)
- 106.3 WJYD London (Urban gospel)
- 106.7 WZCB Dublin (Mainstream urban)
- 107.1 WWLG Circleville (Spanish adult contemporary; WWLA simulcast)
- 107.5 WCKX Columbus (Mainstream urban)
- 107.9 WVMX Westerville (Hot adult contemporary)

=== LPFM ===
- 102.1 WCRM-LP Columbus (Community radio)**
- 102.1 WCBX-LP Columbus (Jazz)**
