= WVKO =

WVKO may refer to:

- WXGT, a radio station (1580 AM) licensed to Columbus, Ohio, United States, which held the call sign WVKO from 1951 to 2020
- WWLA (FM), a radio station (103.1 FM) licensed to Johnstown, Ohio, which held the call sign WVKO-FM from 2004 to 2024
- WSNY, a radio station (94.7 FM) licensed to Columbus, Ohio, which held the call sign WVKO-FM from 1948 to 1983
