= WXMG =

WXMG may refer to:

- WXMG (FM), a radio station (95.5 FM) licensed to serve Lancaster, Ohio, United States
- WJYD, a radio station (106.3 FM) licensed to serve London, Ohio, which held the call sign WXMG from 2011 to 2015
- WTOH, a radio station (98.9 FM) licensed to serve Upper Arlington, Ohio, which held the call sign WXMG from 1998 to 2011
