= WHOK =

WHOK may refer to:

- WJYD, a radio station (107.1 FM) licensed to serve Circleville, Ohio, United States, which held the call sign WHOK-FM from 2013 to 2015
- WXMG (FM), a radio station (95.5 FM) licensed to serve Lancaster, Ohio, which held the call sign WHOK or WHOK-FM from 1948 to 2013
