= WCLT =

WCLT may refer to:

- WCLT (AM), a radio station (1430 AM) licensed to Newark, Ohio, United States
- WCLT-FM, a radio station (100.3 FM) licensed to Newark, Ohio, United States
