= WDLR =

Radio station in Marysville, Ohio

- Marysville, Ohio; United States
- Broadcast area: Delaware, Ohio
- Frequency: 1270 kHz
- Branding: MY 96.7

Programming
- Format: Classic hits
- Affiliations: Cincinnati Bengals Radio Network; Cincinnati Reds Radio Network; Columbus Blue Jackets Radio Network; Ohio State Sports Network

Ownership
- Owner: Brent Casagrande; (Delmar Communications, Inc.)
- Sister stations: WQCD, WVXG

History
- First air date: May 25, 1984
- Former call signs: WUCO (1984–2011); WQTT (2011–2020)

Technical information
- Licensing authority: FCC
- Facility ID: 29636
- Class: B
- Power: 500 watts
- Transmitter coordinates: 40°14′46.00″N 83°19′50.00″W
- Translator: 96.7 W244DV (Marysville)

Links
- Public license information: Public file; LMS
- Webcast: Listen live
- Website: delmarmediagroup.com/radio/967wdlr/

WDLR (1270 AM) is a commercial radio station licensed to Marysville, Ohio. The station primarily serves the Union County region, with limited coverage in the Columbus market. The station is under ownership of Brent Casagrande through licensee Delmar Communications, Inc, and features a locally programmed classic hits format.

== Early history ==
WDLR signed on May 25, 1984, as WUCO with a country music format, switching to oldies in 1991 and adult contemporary in the late 1990s. It was previously owned by Frontier Broadcasting, based in the Columbus suburb of Westerville, and was founded by Bart Johnson, the son of the late farm broadcaster Ed Johnson. WPTW in Piqua was also owned by Frontier Broadcasting (now owned by Muzzy Broadcasting).

It switched again to a classic country format in 2003 before the station was sold to St. Gabriel Radio in 2005. Afterward, Bart Johnson and former ABN Radio farm director Dale Minyo formed Ohio Ag-Net under the umbrella of Agri Communicators Inc., the former parent company of ABN.

== St. Gabriel Radio ==
In August 2005, WUCO was purchased by St. Gabriel Radio Inc. -- formed in 1998 and named for the Archangel Gabriel, the patron saint of communication workers worldwide—and adopted a Catholic-centered format aimed towards the Columbus market, with studios in Columbus. The majority of WUCO's programming schedule included content from EWTN Radio. Beginning in February 2007, WUCO was also near-simulcast on FM via Lexington-licensed WFOT 89.5 MHz, which services the Mansfield area and is now a repeater of WNOC-based Annunciation Radio.

When WUCO moved its studios to Columbus in July 2007 as part of St. Gabriel Radio, Gene Kirby, a community-minded local citizen, stepped up to help fill the void for local community radio when he started up WMHO, a micropower AM broadcaster at 1620 kHz. This Part 15-compliant broadcast first aired classic country and later an oldies format. WMHO was on the air until the summer of 2011 until its tower was irreparably damaged by a lightning strike.

WUCO's connection to St. Gabriel Radio would last until December 2008, when the organization began leasing time on Columbus-licensed WVKO, at the time owned by Bernard Ohio, LLC. This enabled St. Gabriel Radio to expand its reach into the Columbus market and its volunteer base (culminating in the purchase of WOSU (AM) from Ohio State University in December 2011, rechristened as WVSG), while also necessitating a divestiture of WUCO.

== True Oldies Channel ==
WUCO was leased over in late 2009 to ICS Holdings Inc., also then the owner of WDLR in Delaware, adopting The True Oldies Channel a satellite-feed service of Citadel Media, and branded itself as "True Oldies 1270 WQTT," despite the WUCO calls still in use and aired at the top of the hour. ICS Holdings eventually purchased the station in February 2010, changing its name to ICS Communications.

In the summer of 2010, WUCO briefly aired Spanish language programming (not dissimilar to WDLR's Spanish-language format at the time) although the WUCO website - then using the WDLR domain and URL - did not initially reflect this change. WUCO changed back to The True Oldies Channel in December 2010, again with the "1270 WQTT" brand. WUCO's callsign finally changed to WQTT in September 29, 2011.

ICS Holdings sold WQTT, along with WDLR and WVXG, to Delmar Communications, Inc. effective December 30, 2014. The price for the transaction was undisclosed WQTT broadcasts Marysville High School football, along with serving as the Marysville affiliate for both the Cincinnati Reds Radio Network and the Ohio State Sports Network. It also carries coverage of the annual Little Brown Jug horse racing event in Delaware each September, simulcasting sister station WDLR.

== Classic rock format ==
On January 1, 2019, WQTT shifted from an oldies format to a classic rock format. The station relocated back to Marysville, and began airing the Bob & Tom Show.

== My 96.7 ==
On December 8, 2020, WQTT changed its call sign to WDLR (the WDLR calls and classic hits format moved from 1550 AM Delaware, Ohio). On January 1, 2021, WDLR changed its format from classic rock to classic hits, branded as "My 96.7".

== FM translator ==
WDLR launched an FM translator on October 29, 2016. It broadcasts from East of town on US Route 36.

Broadcast translator for WDLR
Callsign	Frequency	City of license	Facility ID	ERP	HAAT	Class	Transmitter coordinates
W244DV	96.7 MHz	Marysville	141717	250 watts	0 meters	D	40°15′42.10″N 83°16′24.10″W

== See also ==
- Classic rock
- WQCD (AM)
- Scott Shannon
