= Ostrander, Ohio =

- Village
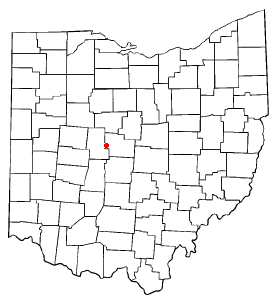
- Location of Ostrander, Ohio

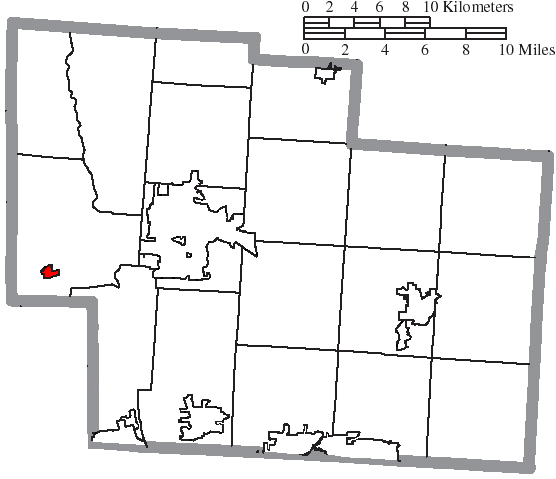
- Location of Ostrander in Delaware County
- Coordinates: 40°16′09″N 83°12′27″W
- Country: United States
- State: Ohio
- County: Delaware
- Township: Scioto

Area
  - Total: 0.94 sq mi (2.43 km^{2})
  - Land: 0.94 sq mi (2.43 km^{2})
  - Water: 0 sq mi (0.00 km^{2})
- Elevation: 938 ft (286 m)

Population (2020)
  - Total: 1,094
  - Density: 1,166.7/sq mi (450.46/km^{2})
- Time zone: UTC-5 (Eastern (EST))
  - Summer (DST): UTC-4 (EDT)
- ZIP code: 43061
- Area code: 740
- FIPS code: 39-58940
- GNIS feature ID: 2399592
- Website: https://ostranderohio.us/

Ostrander (/ˈoʊstrændər/ OH-stran-dər) is a village in Delaware County, Ohio, United States. The population was 1,094 at the 2020 census.

== History ==
Ostrander was laid out in 1852, and incorporated as a village in 1875. The village has the name of one Shelemiah Ostrander, a railroad official. Ostrander was placed along the CCC&I Railroad, which served as the village's lifeline for much of its history. Although the tracks running through Ostrander were taken out of service in 1971, evidence of its locomotive history remains with a railroad bridge over Blues Creek.

== Geography ==
According to the United States Census Bureau, the village has a total area of 0.84 square miles (2.18 km^{2}), all land.

== Demographics ==
Historical population
Census	Pop.	Note	%±
1880	269		—
1890	357		32.7%
1900	401		12.3%
1910	431		7.5%
1920	391		−9.3%
1930	391		0.0%
1940	411		5.1%
1950	408		−0.7%
1960	438		7.4%
1970	399		−8.9%
1980	397		−0.5%
1990	431		8.6%
2000	405		−6.0%
2010	643		58.8%
2020	1,094		70.1%
U.S. Decennial Census

=== 2000 census ===
As of the census of 2000, there were 405 people, 148 households, and 111 families living in the village. The population density was 1,218.5 inhabitants per square mile (470.5/km^{2}). There were 156 housing units at an average density of 469.3 per square mile (181.2/km^{2}). The racial makeup of the village was 98.02% White, 0.25% African American, 0.25% Native American, and 1.48% from two or more races.

There were 148 households, out of which 39.2% had children under the age of 18 living with them, 61.5% were married couples living together, 8.1% had a female householder with no husband present, and 25.0% were non-families. 17.6% of all households were made up of individuals, and 8.8% had someone living alone who was 65 years of age or older. The average household size was 2.74 and the average family size was 3.14.

In the village, the population was spread out, with 27.9% under the age of 18, 8.9% from 18 to 24, 35.1% from 25 to 44, 19.3% from 45 to 64, and 8.9% who were 65 years of age or older. The median age was 34 years. For every 100 females there were 90.1 males. For every 100 females age 18 and over, there were 87.2 males.

The median income for a household in the village was $49,583, and the median income for a family was $49,375. Males had a median income of $36,250 versus $27,500 for females. The per capita income for the village was $27,751. About 6.3% of families and 5.8% of the population were below the poverty line, including 9.4% of those under age 18 and 8.6% of those age 65 or over.

=== 2010 census ===
As of the census of 2010, there were 643 people, 221 households, and 175 families living in the village. The population density was 765.5 inhabitants per square mile (295.6/km^{2}). There were 230 housing units at an average density of 273.8 per square mile (105.7/km^{2}). The racial makeup of the village was 97.7% White, 0.5% African American, 0.3% Asian, and 1.6% from two or more races. Hispanic or Latino of any race were 1.7% of the population.

There were 221 households, of which 44.3% had children under the age of 18 living with them, 62.0% were married couples living together, 9.5% had a female householder with no husband present, 7.7% had a male householder with no wife present, and 20.8% were non-families. 15.4% of all households were made up of individuals, and 5.9% had someone living alone who was 65 years of age or older. The average household size was 2.91 and the average family size was 3.24.

The median age in the village was 35 years. 32.8% of residents were under the age of 18; 6.1% were between the ages of 18 and 24; 28.2% were from 25 to 44; 24.8% were from 45 to 64; and 8.2% were 65 years of age or older. The gender makeup of the village was 52.1% male and 47.9% female.

== Notable people ==
- Ben Curtis - pro golfer
- Ed Johnson - Founder of the Agri Broadcast Network

== Public services ==
Law enforcement in Ostrander is the responsibility of the Ostrander Police Department; fire protection is provided by the Scioto Township Fire Department, and emergency medical services are provided by the Delaware County EMS.

Ostrander has a public library, a branch of the Delaware County District Library.
