= WTDA =

WTDA may refer to:

- WTDA-LP, a low-power radio station (96.5 FM) licensed to serve Williamston, North Carolina, United States
- WJKR, a radio station (103.9 FM) licensed to serve Worthington, Ohio, United States, which held the call sign WTDA from 2004 to 2012
