= WNND =

Radio station in Pickerington, Ohio

WNND and WNNP

WNND: Pickerington, Ohio; WNNP: Richwood, Ohio; United States
- Broadcast area: Columbus metropolitan area
- Frequencies: WNND: 103.5 MHz (HD Radio); WNNP: 104.3 MHz
- Branding: Rewind 103.5/104.3

Programming
- Format: Classic hits

Ownership
- Owner: Saga Communications; (Franklin Communications, Inc.)
- Sister stations: WLVQ; WSNY; WVMX

History
- First air date: WNND: 1989 (as WSWZ); WNNP: 1995 (as WZJZ)
- Former call signs: WNND: WSWZ (1989–1998); WJZA (1998–2010); WNNP: WZJZ (1995–1999); WJZK (1999–2009); WODB (2009–2010)

Technical information
- Licensing authority: FCC
- Facility ID: WNND: 60590; WNNP: 30563
- Class: WNND: A; WNNP: A
- ERP: WNND: 4,200 watts; WNNP: 3,400 watts
- HAAT: WNND: 119 meters; WNNP: 133 meters
- Transmitter coordinates: WNND: 39°57′0.00″N 82°43′29.00″W; WNNP: 40°18′22.00″N 83°19′45.00″W

Links
- Public license information: WNND: Public file; LMS; WNNP: Public file; LMS
- Webcast: Listen Live
- Website: Rewind 103.5/104.3

WNND and WNNP, branded Rewind 103.5/104.3, are two FM radio stations serving the Columbus, Ohio, market. Owned by Saga Communications and operated as part of its Columbus Radio Group, WNND broadcasts on 103.5 MHz from Pickerington, Ohio, and WNNP broadcasts on 104.3 MHz from Richwood, Ohio. Rewind 103.5/104.3's studios are located in Upper Arlington.

These frequencies have simulcast for most of their history, joining from 1999 to 2009 and again since 2010. WNND launched in 1989 as WSWZ and switched to smooth jazz as WJZA in 1998. WNNP launched in 1995 as a separate jazz station, WZJZ, before flipping to a simulcast of WJZA as WJZK in 1999. The simulcast was broken in 2009, when 104.3 switched to classic hits as WODB "Big Hits B104.3". Both stations were relaunched, again as a simulcast but this time in the classic hits format, on July 30, 2010, adopting their present call signs.

At 4:35 p.m. on July 30, 2010, after a brief stunt airing songs with an "end" theme, WJZA and WODB became "Rewind 103.5/104.3: Columbus' Greatest Hits," and adopted a 1980s-based classic hits format. The first song on "Rewind" was "Let's Groove" by Earth, Wind & Fire. On August 6, 2010, WJZA and WODB changed their call letters to WNND and WNNP, respectively.

WNND broadcasts in the HD Radio format.

== History ==
WNND and WNNP are now one of two radio stations in the Columbus market to have a Classic Hits format, joining Newark-based WNKO. They also feature the second 1980s-derived classic hits format in Columbus radio history, as sister station WVMX was all-1980s WXST ("Star 107.9") back in the late 1990s.

=== WSWZ (FM), later WJZA (103.5 FM) ===
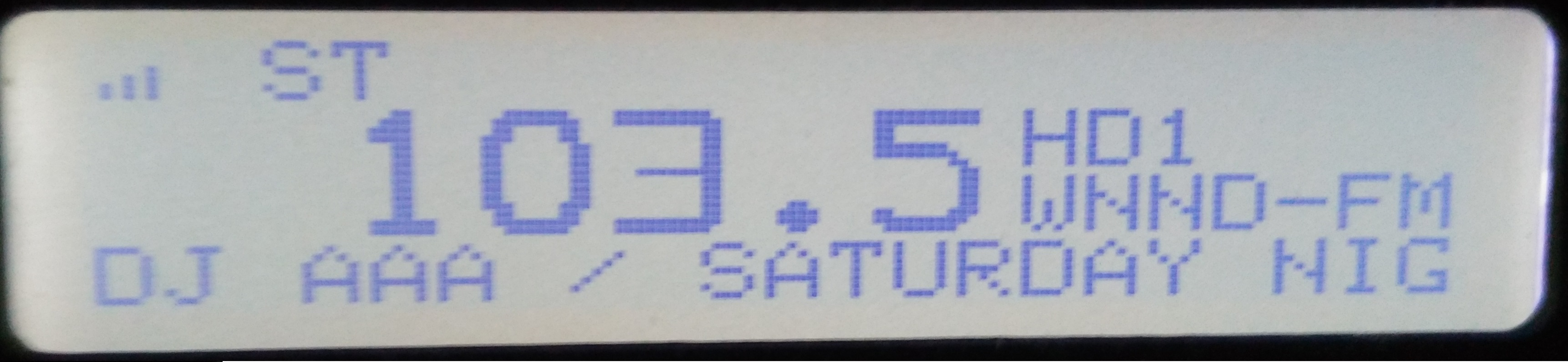
WNND's HD Radio Channel on a SPARC Radio with PSD

On 103.5 MHz, WSWZ (FM) signed on the air at 6 AM on October 7, 1989 with 6 kilowatts from a non-directional antenna on Tower Hill north of Lancaster that also reached into nearby Columbus, more than 30 miles distant. "Z-103" programmed an oldies format to Lancaster and Columbus that ultimately proved so popular that two more powerful FM stations in Ohio's capital city also switched to an oldies format. Along with the oldies format, WSWZ-FM also programmed local newscasts twice an hour in the mornings, and twice an hour in the afternoons. In its later years, the station received most of its oldies from a satellite playlist service, but kept 8 hours of local programming along with news inserts during morning and afternoon drive times.

New owners changed the call letters of WSWZ to WJZA on February 13, 1998, and switched the format to smooth jazz, taking the format previously aired on 107.5 in Columbus. That station dropped the WJZA calls and smooth jazz format on December 26, 1997 in exchange for WCKX's calls and format, which were dropped from 106.3 FM (now known as WHTD).

In time, the usage of the "smooth jazz" name was taken very liberally as WJZA shifted to a hybrid of Adult Contemporary, Urban AC, and instrumental covers, while the majority of WJZA's programming was soon derived from Broadcast Architecture's "Your Smooth Jazz" service, which chiefly operated under this hybrid style. The jazz and smooth jazz formats proved sustainable, but not as popular as the original oldies format on WSWZ.

=== WNNP (104.3 FM) ===
WNNP began broadcasting in 1995 as WZJZ with a jazz format. In 1999, WZJZ switched to a simulcast of WJZA's smooth jazz programming under the WJZK call letters. Their classic hits format, known as "Big Hits B104.3", launched on February 2, 2009 at 12:00PM, taken from the former "Big Hits B107.9" WODB at 107.9, which a few days earlier, switched to a Hot AC format as WVMX, "Mix 107.9." Morning host Dave Kay was the only local personality on the station, with the rest of the programming having been satellite-fed from Dial Global (but under a different channel than the one WTDA carried).

Due to WNNP's transmitter originating 40 miles northwest from Columbus in Richwood, the 104.3 signal suffers coverage problems in the Columbus metro, mainly in the eastern and southern portions. While still WODB, the station filed an application to change its city of license and transmitter location from Richwood to West Jefferson, Ohio, along with increasing power from 3.4 KW to 6 KW, so as to offer better coverage in the Columbus area. The move ultimately was rejected by the FCC.

== A Letter from WJZA's Columbusjazz.com as of July 30, 2010 ==
One thing we can count on in life is change.

It’s in that spirit that we tell you that the programming on 103.5 is changing.

Playing smooth jazz music is one side of who we are. It’s the side you hear.

The other side of who we are is the reality that operating a commercial radio station is a business. That is the side that we see. In the last few years the business side of Smooth Jazz 103.5 has become increasingly difficult.

There are many reasons for this, but the unfortunate fact is that the audience for the station can no longer sustain the business of the station. In that way we are no different than a retail business that doesn’t have enough customers to keep the doors open.

You do have an option for listening. You can still listen to the same Smooth Jazz Network on-line from their web site.

We've considered it an honor and pleasure to have entertained you over the past few years. Thank you for listening.

Sincerely,

The Staff & Management of Smooth Jazz WJZA
