= WODB =

WODB may refer to:

- WODB-LP, a low-power radio station (90.9 FM) licensed to serve Caguas, Puerto Rico
- WNNP, a radio station (104.3 FM) licensed to serve Richwood, Ohio, United States, which held the call sign WODB from 2009 to 2010
