= WHTH =

Radio station in Heath, Ohio

- Heath, Ohio; United States
- Broadcast area: Columbus, Ohio (limited)
- Frequency: 790 kHz
- Branding: 107.7 Buckeye Country

Programming
- Format: Country

Ownership
- Owner: Runnymede Corporation
- Sister stations: WNKO

History
- First air date: 1970
- Call sign meaning: Heath

Technical information
- Licensing authority: FCC
- Facility ID: 57937
- Class: D
- Power: 1,000 watts (day); 26 watts (night)
- Transmitter coordinates: 40°03′05″N 82°28′08″W
- Translator: 107.7 W299CG (Newark)
- Repeater: 101.7 WNKO-HD2 (Newark)

Links
- Public license information: Public file; LMS
- Website: www.wnko.com

WHTH (790 AM, "107.7 Buckeye Country") is a radio station broadcasting a country music format. Licensed to Heath, Ohio, United States. The station is locally owned and operated by the Runnymede Corporation.
