= WQCD (AM) =

Radio station in Delaware, Ohio

Simulcast of WVXG Mount Gilead
- Delaware, Ohio; United States
- Broadcast area: Delaware County, Ohio
- Frequency: 1550 kHz
- Branding: Classic Rock 93X

Programming
- Format: Classic rock

Ownership
- Owner: Brent Casagrande; (Delmar Communications, Inc.)
- Sister stations: WXGT; WDLR; WVXG

History
- First air date: January 18, 1961
- Former call signs: WDLE (1960); WONT (1960); WDLR (1960–2004); WXOL (2004–2007); WDLR (2007–2020)
- Call sign meaning: Disambiguation of WWCD (former branding)

Technical information
- Licensing authority: FCC
- Facility ID: 54557
- Class: D
- Power: 5,000 watts (day); 29 watts (night)
- Transmitter coordinates: 40°17′56″N 83°2′46″W
- Translator: 92.9 W225CM (Delaware)

Links
- Public license information: Public file; LMS
- Webcast: Listen live
- Website: delmarmediagroup.com/radio/wvxg/

WQCD (1550 AM) is a commercial classic rock radio station licensed to serve Delaware, Ohio, locally owned by Brent Casagrande through licensee Delmar Communications, Inc. The station is a full-time simulcast of WVXG in Mount Gilead. In addition to a standard analog transmission, WQCD is relayed over analog Delaware translator W225CM (92.9 FM); as WXGT's FM translator W225CS (92.9 FM) also broadcasts on the same frequency, WXGT and WQCD brand as "93X". The station's studios are located in Columbus's Brewery District, while the WQCD transmitter is located in Delaware.

The station broadcasts at 5,000 watts during the day and 29 watts at night as a Class D operation, to protect nearby Class-A clear-channel station CBEF Windsor, Ontario.

== History ==
The station signed on the air in October 1960 as WDLR. The call sign represented the station's city of license: Delaware. Initially locally owned through Delaware Broadcasting, Inc., the station was purchased in 1968 by Cardinal Communications Group which was the broadcast arm of tobacco conglomerate R. J. Reynolds. In 1973, it was sold to Radio Delaware Incorporated which was principally owned by James N Shaheen.

In the early 1990s, WDLR was famous among Ohio Wesleyan students for its lunchtime program "Tradio", hosted by Stu Sisk.

In 1997, Radio Delaware sold the station to Fifteen Fifty Corporation which was owned by Patrica Casagrande of Powell, Ohio and her son Robert G. Casagrande.

Prior to taking back the WDLR call sign in July 2007, the station used WXOL after June 9, 2004.

In summer 2008, WDLR was acquired by ICS Holdings, Inc., which is owned principally by Mark Litton.

For several years, WDLR was a Spanish language Regional Mexican music format under the branding "La Jefa 1550" and was geared to the Hispanic communities of the greater Columbus area. "La Jefa" is Spanish for "The Chief" and the name of the branding of a group of similarly related branded format stations, many of which owned by Univision Radio. During this time, the station was also the local affiliate of The Don Cheto Show in morning drive.

In 2014, WDLR flipped from Regional Mexican to a gold-based 1970s/1980s adult contemporary format under the name "Local 1550". WDLR - along with sister station WQTT in Marysville - had derived a portion of its programming from Scott Shannon's The True Oldies Channel from Cumulus Media Networks. After distributor Cumulus Media Networks discontinued The True Oldies Channel in June 2014, WDLR began programming their music format in-house.

ICS Holdings sold WDLR, along with WQTT and WVXG, to Delmar Communications, Inc. effective December 30, 2014. The price for the transaction was $250,000.

Logo as "Local 92.9"

WDLR began simulcasting its programming on 92.9 FM in June 2016. The FM signal is transmitted from the same location as the AM towers, off U.S. 36/State Route 37 on the east side of Delaware. On July 15, 2020, WDLR began an additional simulcast on WVKO (now WXGT) and its translator W225CS, both located in Columbus. Weeks later, WDLR adopted a new format and slogan called "My 92.9". The format now includes hits from the 2000s, as well as a different song lineup. During this era, the station broadcast high school football and basketball, along with serving as the Delaware affiliate for the Cleveland Indians Radio Network, and also served as the flagship station for coverage of the annual Little Brown Jug horse racing event. WDLR was a local affiliate for ABC News Radio, ONN Radio and the Ohio Ag Net and carried hourly updates from Fox Sports Radio and localized weather forecasts from WeatherBug.

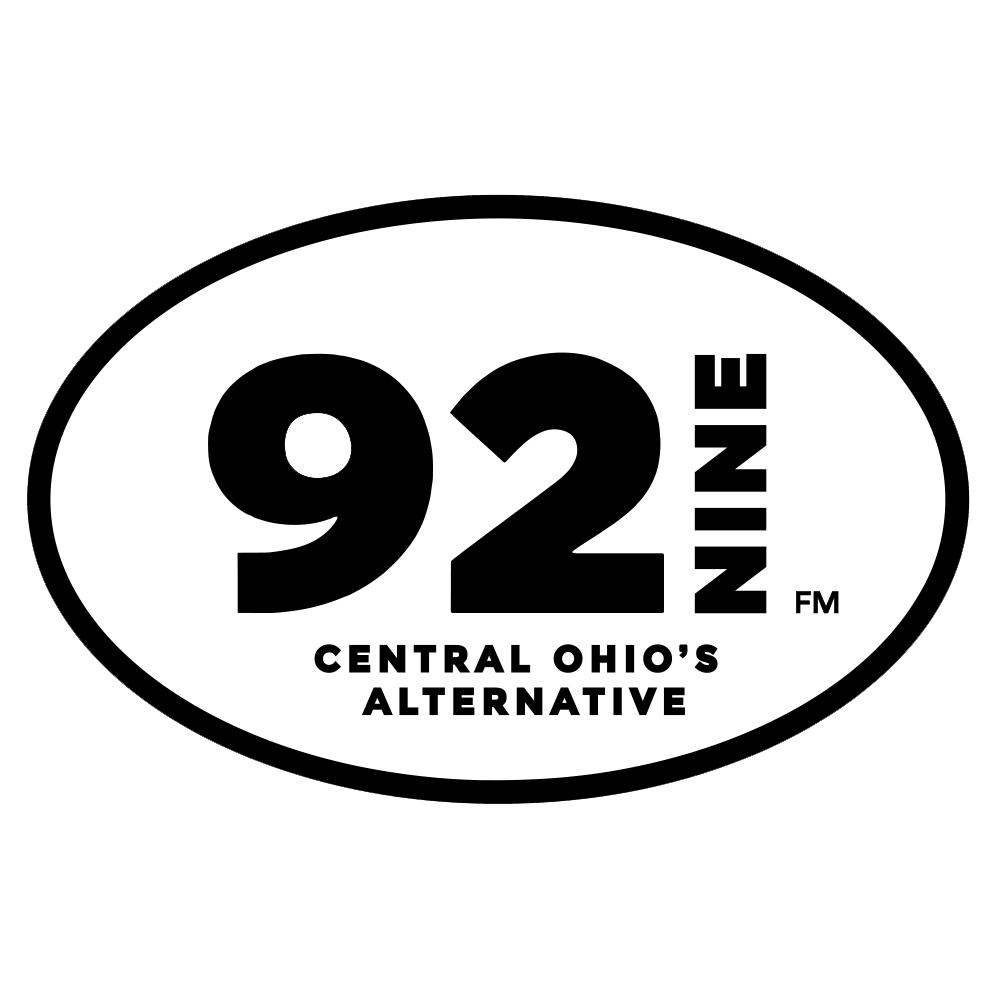
Logo as "CD 92.9"

On September 1, 2020, WDLR and WMYC re-branded as "My 92.9". On November 21, 2020, WMYC would drop the format to adopt an alternative rock format under the operation of WWCD Limited; at that time, it was similarly announced that WDLR would begin simulcasting the new format of WMYC on January 1, 2021. The station changed its call sign to WQCD on December 8, 2020.

The local marketing agreement with WWCD Limited ended on January 31, 2024. On February 1, Delmar Media launched an in-house alternative rock format on WWCD (the former WMYC; renamed WXGT) and WQCD as "93X". Delmar announced that the first ten days of "93X" would be commercial-free, and that the station would carry news updates from ABC News Radio. After five weeks, WXGT and WQCD moved to an oldies format on March 8, 2024, returning to the "My 92.9" branding used in 2020 and retaining the ABC affiliation; Delmar had continued to use the "My" branding in the Delaware area on WDLR (1270 AM).

On March 18, 2025, WQCD changed their format from oldies to Spanish tropical, branded as "Rumba 92.9" (Temporary format; WQCD will be changing to Regional Mexican as "La Grande 92.9 on April 1).

On January 20, 2026, WQCD changed its format from Regional Mexican to a simulcast of classic rock-formatted WVXG 95.1 FM Mount Gilead, branded as "93X".

=== FM Translator ===
Call sign	Frequency	City of license	FID	ERP (W)	HAAT	Class	Transmitter coordinates	FCC info
W225CM	92.9 FM	Delaware, Ohio	142214	250	76 m (249 ft)	D	40°17′57″N 83°02′45″W	LMS
