= La Mega Media =

American Spanish-language newspaper, magazine and radio station chain

La Mega Media, Inc.
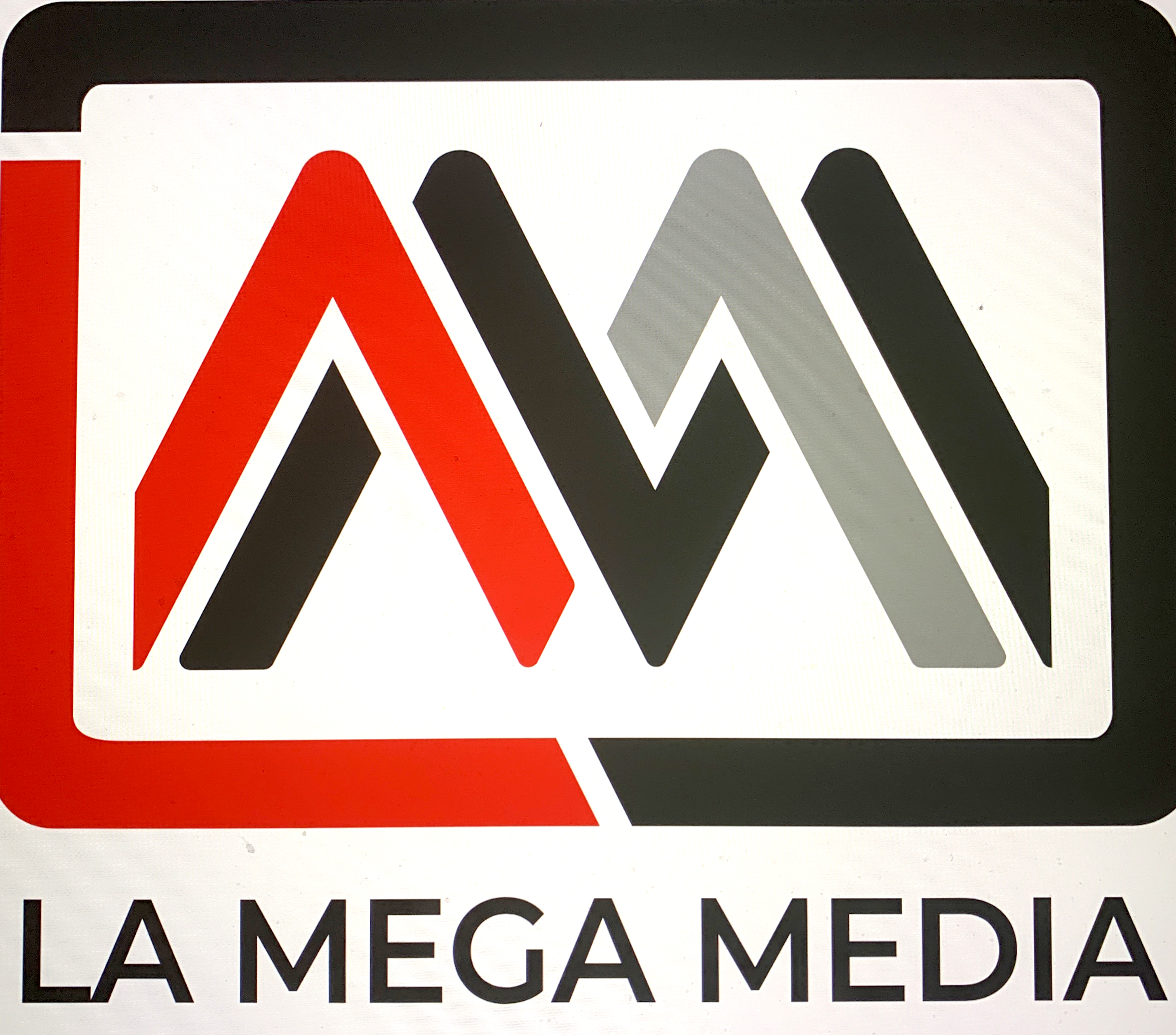
- Industry: Radio Broadcasting and Publishing
- Founded: 1999 (originally as The Spanish Journal)
- Headquarters: Columbus, Ohio, USA
- Key people: Roland Medrano (CEO)
- Products: La Mega Nota, LaMega1, La Mega Radio
- Revenue: $3 million (2019)
- Number of employees: 24 (2019)
- Website: Official Website

La Mega Media, Inc., also known as La Mega Nota, is a chain of bilingual weekly newspapers, monthly magazines, and Spanish-language radio stations based in Columbus, Ohio, that serves Hispanic communities in several metropolitan areas of the United States such as Cleveland, Cincinnati, Columbus, Dayton, Pittsburgh and North Kentucky.

== History ==
The media company was founded in 1999 as TSJ Media, parent company of the monthly broadsheet newspaper The Spanish Journal (Spanish: La Jornada Latina), which was published in Cincinnati. In 2006, TSJ News was bought by Blue Ash, Ohio–based Gate West Coast Ventures, LLC, which also owns the translation company Strategic Spanish. As a division of Gate West Coast, TSJ expanded to several other markets in the Midwestern United States. In 2019 TSJ Media, TSJ News and TSJ Radio was bought by Columbus, Ohio-based La Mega Media, Inc., creating the largest Hispanic media platform in the Midwest. La Mega Media's new service model offers content, promotions and entertainment by integrating the 3 radio stations – La Mega 103.1 FM in Columbus, La Mega 97.7 FM in Cincinnati, La Mega 1300 AM in Cleveland, Newspaper La Mega Nota and the La Mega1 App

== Publications ==
La Mega Media's print publications La Mega Nota are centrally produced in Cincinnati Ohio, while ads are sold by local staff throughout Ohio and Pittsburgh, PA. For the most part, the La Mega Nota publications are written in Spanish, although some sections may be written in English for ESL students.

== Broadcasting ==
In September 2001, the Spanish Journal Network had a talk show on Christian radio station WTSJ 1050 AM (now WGRI; the calls standing for its initials were coincidental), called Noticiero Latino–Radio en Español. It ended on December 26, 2005 due to the end of their time brokerage agreement on that station.

After launching an information-by-telephone service (iNFO-TELEFONO) and converting the newspaper from a monthly publication to a weekly one, the Spanish Journal Network resumed broadcasts of Radio en Español in Spring 2005 on WDBZ 1230 AM, airing each Sunday with six hours of programming.

TSJ Media operates three Spanish-language radio stations, two of which it took over under Gate West Coast ownership, the third under Murray Hill Broadcasting:

- WOXY "La Mega 97.7 FM" in Mason, Ohio (Cincinnati)
- WWLA "Mega 103.1" in Columbus, Ohio
- WLFM-LP "La Mega 87.7" in Cleveland, Ohio

In addition to its Spanish-language radio stations, TSJ Media also operated WVKO (1580 AM), an English-language classic hits station in Columbus, Ohio.

- WTUV and WHBE-FM "La Poderosa 105.7 FM & 620 AM" in Eminence, Kentucky (Louisville)
- KMNV and KMNQ "La Invasora 1400 AM – 1470 AM" in Minneapolis–Saint Paul
