= WTOH =

Radio station in Upper Arlington–Columbus, Ohio

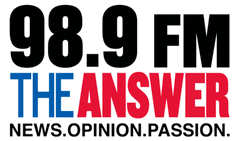

Upper Arlington, Ohio; United States
- Broadcast area: Columbus, Ohio
- Frequency: 98.9 MHz (HD Radio)
- Branding: 98.9 The Answer

Programming
- Language: English
- Format: Conservative talk radio
- Subchannels: HD2: Today's Christian Music 95.9 (Contemporary Christian)
- Affiliations: Compass Media Networks; Pittsburgh Steelers Radio Network; Radio America; Salem Radio Network; Townhall News

Ownership
- Owner: Salem Media Group; (Salem Media of Ohio, Inc.)
- Sister stations: WRFD

History
- First air date: 1989; 37 years ago
- Former call signs: WXMX (1989–91); WRVF (1991–94); WLLD (1994–97); WZAZ-FM (1997–98); WXMG (1998–2011); WJKR (2011–13)
- Call sign meaning: "Talk Ohio"

Technical information
- Licensing authority: FCC
- Facility ID: 73972
- Class: A
- ERP: 2,600 watts
- HAAT: 154 meters (505 ft)
- Transmitter coordinates: 39°58′16″N 83°1′40″W
- Translator: HD2: 95.9 W240CX (Columbus)

Links
- Public license information: Public file; LMS
- Webcast: Listen live; Listen live (via Audacy); Listen live (HD2)
- Website: www.989theanswer.com; 959columbus.com (HD2)

WTOH (98.9 FM, "The Answer") is a conservative talk radio station serving the Greater Columbus area, currently owned by the Salem Media Group and licensed to Upper Arlington, Ohio. The station's studios are shared with sister station WRFD (880 AM) and are located in North Columbus; WTOH's transmitter is northwest of downtown.

== History ==
=== Adult contemporary (1989–1991) ===
The station began in 1989 as adult contemporary WXMX "The Mix" by Twin Rivers Communications owned by Michael and Mary Mahaffey.

=== Country (1991–1996) ===
In 1991, the station was purchased by Alan Gray's Tri-City Radio and changed to modern country music as WRVF "98.9 The River." In 1994 the station was sold to Carl Hirsch who re-imaged it as "Wild Country, The New 98.9" (under the WLLD calls) and again later as the decidedly less aggressive "Country 98-9". The station briefly stunted in late 1996 by simulcasting audio from 98.9 MHz on both 105.7 MHz and 107.1 MHz in a short-lived attempt to "surround" country competitor WCOL-FM.

=== Alternative (1996–1998) ===
Then-owner Jacor Communications programmed the station as the alternative rock "Channel Z" (under the WZAZ-FM calls) prior to an acquisition by Blue Chip Broadcasting (and subsequently Radio One).

=== Urban (1998–2011) ===
After "Channel Z" was relocated to 105.7 FM and Blue Chip's acquisition, the station flipped to urban oldies as "Magic 98.9", WXMG, in 1998, which later evolved to Urban AC in 2001, retaining the "Magic" moniker.

=== Adult hits ===
At 12:00pm on September 16, 2011, "Magic 98.9" moved to sister station WJYD, displacing the urban gospel format ("Joy 106.3"). The 98.9 frequency then flipped to adult hits, branded as "98-9 Jack FM." The first song on "Jack FM" was "Cum on Feel the Noize" by Quiet Riot. On September 23, 2011, WXMG changed their call letters to WJKR (at the same time, the WXMG calls moved to WJYD). The station was one of three non-urban radio stations owned by Radio One (the others being all-news KROI—Houston and Top 40 WNOU—Indianapolis), until the company sold it on October 23, 2012, to Salem Communications.

=== Talk (2012–present) ===
On November 1, 2012, at approximately 12:01 a.m., "Jack FM" signed off after playing "It's The End Of The World As We Know It" by R.E.M. Salem Communications took over after a few seconds of dead air with a speech from Ronald Reagan, with the official launch of "98.9 The Answer" at 6 that morning.

On February 15, 2013, the WJKR callsign changed to WTOH.

The "Jack FM" format and WJKR callsign returned to Columbus on July 24, 2013 when WMNI-FM flipped from a simulcast of then sister station News/Talk WMNI (who flipped to adult standards 6 days earlier) back to Adult Hits as "103.9 Jack FM". The station had originally carried the format as WTDA "103.9 Ted FM" from 2005-2007.

== HD Radio ==
WTOH also broadcasts in HD Radio. Its HD2 subchannel airs a Christian contemporary format and is branded "Today's Christian Music 95.9". Its HD2 subchannel is simulcast on 95.9 MHz, through translator W240CX.

Call sign	Frequency	City of license	FID	ERP (W)	HAAT	Class	FCC info
W240CX	95.9 FM	Columbus, Ohio	10906	99	209 m (686 ft)	D	LMS
