= WJKR =

Radio station in Worthington–Columbus, Ohio

- Worthington, Ohio; United States
- Broadcast area: Columbus metro area
- Frequency: 103.9 MHz (HD Radio)
- Branding: 103.9 The Maverick

Programming
- Format: Classic country
- Subchannels: HD2: Soft AC; HD3: Sports (WMNI)

Ownership
- Owner: North American Broadcasting Company, Inc.
- Sister stations: WMNI, WRKZ

History
- First air date: September 4, 1998
- Former call signs: WAXV (1998, CP); WEGE (1998–2004); WTDA (2004–2012); WMNI-FM (2012–2013)
- Call sign meaning: Former Jack FM affiliate

Technical information
- Licensing authority: FCC
- Facility ID: 60099
- Class: A
- ERP: 6,000 watts
- HAAT: 99.3 meters (326 ft)
- Transmitter coordinates: 40.1592°N 82.9230°W
- Translator: HD2: 94.1 W231EG (Columbus)

Links
- Public license information: Public file; LMS
- Webcast: Listen live; Listen live (HD2)
- Website: 1039themaverick.com; mystar941.com (HD2)

WJKR (103.9 FM) is a commercial radio station licensed to Worthington, Ohio, United States, and serving the Columbus metro area. It carries a classic country format known as "103.9 The Maverick". Owned by North American Broadcasting Company, Inc., its studios are located on Dublin Road in Columbus.

WJKR's transmitter is located off of Fisher Road near Interstate 270 in Columbus. WJKR also broadcasts in HD Radio: the HD2 subchannel plays soft adult contemporary music and feeds FM translator W231EG at 94.1 MHz, and the HD3 subchannel simulcasts WMNI.

== Prior history of 103.9 FM in Columbus ==
Prior to this station's establishment, the 103.9 MHz frequency in the Columbus market was occupied by WBBY-FM, licensed to Westerville, Ohio. It went on the air on May 5, 1969. WBBY was ordered to go silent on December 31, 1990. It was found that the majority owner/station manager withheld details to the Federal Communications Commission (FCC) about his level of involvement in a Marietta, Ohio car dealership.

WBBY-FM held a jazz format throughout most of its existence. That format was eventually picked up by WZJZ and WSWZ.

== History ==
The current station signed on the air on September 4, 1998. It was also initially licensed to Westerville. At first, it broadcast classic rock music as "Eagle 103.9." It used the call sign WEGE.

The station became WTDA ("Ted FM") in 2004 with an adult hits format. It had a sound similar to Jack FM, which was gaining popularity across America. (A real Jack FM station would later air on this frequency.) With the Ted FM format, WTDA used the slogan "We Play Anything." The station's call letters attempted to incorporate this "Ted FM" branding. In September 2005, the station's owners added the Indianapolis-based syndicated Bob & Tom Show for morning drive time. Bob & Tom had recently been dropped by Clear Channel's WBWR.

On January 8, 2007, WTDA rebranded as something new. It was the first FM talk radio station in Columbus. It picked up The Glenn Beck Radio Program after the show was dropped from 610 WTVN. On September 8, 2007, the Columbus Dispatch reported that WTDA had become the Columbus radio home of the Pittsburgh Steelers football team. The format lasted less than three years.

On December 21, 2009, WTDA flipped to classic hits and rebranded as "Classic Hits 103.9." It used satellite programming from Dial Global's Classic Hits service. WTDA was one of four radio stations in the Columbus market to have a Classic Hits/Oldies format, joining Newark-based WNKO and the WNND/WNNP "Rewind 103.5/104.3" simulcast.

On June 14, 2012, WTDA flipped to an all-news format, changing the call letters to WMNI-FM. The format was simulcast with WMNI 920 AM, which previously had an adult standards format. WMNI-AM-FM used a national all-news service from America's Radio News Network. The simulcast ended on Thursday, July 18, 2013, when WMNI returned to the adult standards format. WMNI-FM kept the news format for a few more days.

On July 24, 2013, WMNI-FM changed format to adult hits, subscribing to the JACK FM service. It rebranded as "103-9 Jack FM". The call letters were changed to WJKR the following day. The WJKR call sign was formerly used on 98.9 FM, which itself carried the "Jack FM" format in Columbus, and is now conservative talk WTOH. WJKR changed its city of license from Westerville, Ohio, to Worthington, Ohio, effective August 22, 2013.

On April 15, 2022, at noon, WJKR flipped to a country music format, branded as "Country 103.9". It competes for country listeners with WCOL-FM 92.3, owned by iHeartMedia and often the #1 station in Columbus. WCLT-FM 100.3 also has a country format.

On February 28, 2025, WJKR changed its format from mainstream country to classic country, branded as "103.9 The Maverick".

== WJKR-HD2 ==
On June 14, 2022, WJKR's HD2 subchannel switched from a simulcast of WMNI 920 AM (which flipped to sports) to a soft adult contemporary format, branded as "Star 95.1" (simulcast on translator W236CZ 95.1 FM Columbus). On September 15, 2023, it was announced that W236CZ's frequency would move to 94.1 FM on October 9, 2023, in connection with a strong upgrade with its 141-meter antenna, raising the power from 88 to 250 watts.

On October 12, 2023, W236CZ was licensed to operate on 94.1 FM, as W231EG. The station calls itself "Star 94.1" and uses the syndicated John Tesh Intelligence for Your Life show for its morning drive time program.

== Translator ==
WJKR rebroadcasts its HD2 subchannel on the following translator:

Broadcast translator for WJKR-HD2
Call sign	Frequency	City of license	FID	ERP (W)	Class	FCC info
W231EG	94.1 FM	Columbus, Ohio	142835	250	D	LMS

== Previous logos ==
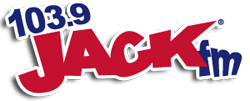
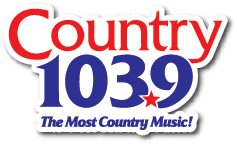
