= WCLT (AM) =

Radio station in Newark, Ohio

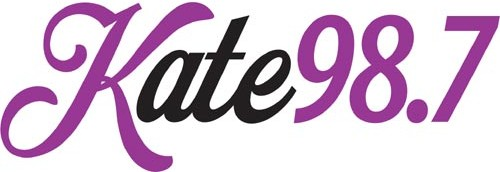
- Newark, Ohio; United States
- Frequency: 1430 kHz
- Branding: Kate 98.7

Programming
- Format: Adult contemporary
- Affiliations: Fox News Radio; Westwood One; Agri Broadcast Network; Cincinnati Bengals Radio Network; Ohio State Sports Network; Motor Racing Network

Ownership
- Owner: WCLT Radio
- Sister stations: WCLT-FM

History
- First air date: 1949

Technical information
- Licensing authority: FCC
- Facility ID: 71284
- Class: D
- Power: 500 watts day 48 watts night
- Transmitter coordinates: 40°2′2″N 82°24′8″W
- Translator: 98.7 W254CT (Newark)

Links
- Public license information: Public file; LMS
- Webcast: Listen Live
- Website: WCLT Online

WCLT (1430 AM) is a radio station broadcasting an adult contemporary format. Licensed to Newark, Ohio, United States. The station is currently owned by WCLT Radio and features programming from Fox News Radio and Westwood One.

== FM Translator ==
In addition to the main station at 1430 kHz, WCLT is relayed by an FM translator to widen the broadcast area, especially during nighttime hours when the AM frequency broadcasts with only 48 watts.

Broadcast translator for WCLT
Call sign	Frequency	City of license	FID	ERP (W)	Class	FCC info
W254CT	98.7 FM	Newark, Ohio	142529	250	D	LMS

It is on 98.7 MHz and has a power of 250 watts.

== History ==
On January 11, 2017, at 12:00 p.m., WCLT changed their format from sports to adult contemporary, branded as "Kate 98.7". Also , it added an FM Transmitter then on 98.7 MHz.

== Previous logo ==
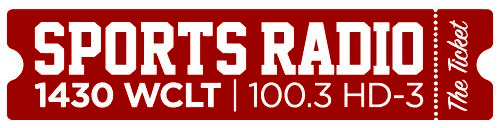
