= WWLG =

Radio station in Circleville, Ohio

Simulcast of WWLA, Johnstown, Ohio
- Circleville, Ohio; United States
- Broadcast area: Columbus metropolitan area
- Frequency: 107.1 MHz (HD Radio)
- Branding: La Mega 103.1/107.1

Programming
- Language: Spanish
- Format: AC/Regional Mexican

Ownership
- Owner: Urban One; (Blue Chip Broadcasting Licenses, Ltd.)
- Sister stations: WCKX, WJYD, WXMG, WWLA

History
- First air date: 1965; 61 years ago
- Former call signs: WNRE (1965–1972); WNRE-FM (1972–1987); WNHZ (1987–1988); WLRO (1988–1990); WTLT (1990–1993); WAHC (1993–1997); WAZU-FM (1997–1998); WAZU (1998–2007); WNKK (2007–2013); WHOK-FM (2013–2015); WJYD (2015–2024)
- Call sign meaning: "La Mega"

Technical information
- Licensing authority: FCC
- Facility ID: 64717
- Class: A
- ERP: 6,000 watts
- HAAT: 100 meters (328 ft)
- Transmitter coordinates: 39°39′52.2″N 82°51′3.6″W

Links
- Public license information: Public file; LMS
- Webcast: Listen live
- Website: columbus.lamegamedia.com

WWLG (107.1 FM) is a commercial radio station licensed to Circleville, Ohio, and serving the Columbus metropolitan area. Branded as "La Mega", the station is owned by Urban One and broadcasts a combination Spanish AC/Regional Mexican format.

WWLG's effective radiated power (ERP) is 6,000 watts. The transmitter site is on Ringgold-Fairfield Road in Circleville.

== Station history ==
In 1965, the station signed on the air as WNRE, which stood for the young owner's name, Nelson Embry. At the time, the station broadcast from a small downtown Circleville studio with a very low power signal. The transmitter was later moved to its present location on a hill along State Route 159 northeast of Circleville.

In the mid-1980s, the station adopted the Z-Rock syndicated hard rock format before changing format and call letters to WLRO with the slogan "Lady Radio", featuring programming geared specifically towards women. That was short lived, and in 1989, the station was changed to "Classic Hits 107.1", with a classic hits format. In the early 1990s, it was WTLT "The Light", playing a contemporary Christian format.

In 1993, 107.1 flipped to a simulcast of WAKS (105.7 FM)'s rhythmic CHR format, first as "Hot 105/107", then as contemporary hit radio "105.7/107.1 Kiss FM". In April 1994, the "KISS-FM" branding and format moved exclusively to 107.1, becoming "The New 107.1 Kiss FM".

In January 1995, after teasing a "major announcement" for about a week, 107.1 flipped to 1970s music as "Arrow 107.1", complimenting 105.7 once again.

Arrow ended in 1996 and 107.1 then became active rock "107.1 The Big Wazoo". The station complimented its sister station WLVQ, which had a classic rock format. This name and format would broadcast on 107.1 until January 8, 2007, at 8 p.m., when WAZU flipped to country as "Wink 107.1". "Wink" debuted with Big & Rich’s "Comin' to Your City" followed by Brooks & Dunn’s "Play Something Country".

On April 1, 2013, the country format of Wink was merged with K95's format and became "K95 at 107.1" with a classic country format, changed shortly after to "K107.1".

At 12:00 a.m., on November 13, 2015, the station flipped to a simulcast of WXMG, as Radio One had purchased WHOK-FM and sister WZOH-FM from Wilks. WHOK then flipped to urban gospel as "Joy 107.1" on November 16 at 5:00 p.m. The station changed its call sign to WJYD on November 23, 2015.

On November 1, 2024, the station would flip to a Spanish AC/Regional Mexican format, simulcasting La Mega Media owned WWLA under a new arrangement between Urban One and the company; the company had also filed for new callsign WWLG with the move. The "Joy" format would move to WHTD.
