= WRFD =

Christian talk radio station in Columbus–Worthington, Ohio, United States

- Columbus-Worthington, Ohio; United States
- Broadcast area: Columbus metropolitan area
- Frequency: 880 kHz
- Branding: The Word 880 AM 104.5 FM

Programming
- Format: Christian radio
- Affiliations: SRN News

Ownership
- Owner: Salem Media Group; (Salem Media of Ohio, Inc.)
- Sister stations: WTOH

History
- First air date: September 27, 1947
- Call sign meaning: "Rural Free Delivery"

Technical information
- Licensing authority: FCC
- Facility ID: 58630
- Class: D
- Power: 23,000 watts (days only); 6,100 watts (critical hours)
- Transmitter coordinates: 39°56′31″N 83°1′20″W
- Translator: 104.5 W283CL (Columbus)

Links
- Public license information: Public file; LMS
- Webcast: Listen live Listen live (via Audacy); Listen live (via iHeartRadio)
- Website: thewordcolumbus.com

WRFD (880 AM) is a commercial radio station licensed to both Columbus and Worthington, Ohio. It is owned by the Salem Media Group and broadcasts a Christian talk and teaching radio format. WRFD and sister station WTOH (98.9 FM) share studios on North High Street in the northwest portion of Columbus; WRFD's transmitter is near the former site of Cooper Stadium in the Franklinton section of Columbus.

WRFD is licensed by the Federal Communications Commission as a daytime-only station. To avoid interference, it is required to sign off at local sunset to protect WHSQ in New York City, a 50,000-watt clear-channel station using the same frequency. WRFD's programming can be heard around the clock over low-power FM translator station W283CL (104.5 FM), which transmits from a tower located on Stimmel Road, also in Franklinton.

== History ==
WRFD signed on the air on September 14, 1947. It broadcast only during the day, originally at 5,000 watts of power. It was owned and operated by Peoples Broadcasting Company. Peoples Broadcasting was a subsidiary of the Farm Bureau Mutual Insurance Company (the present-day Nationwide Mutual Insurance Company; the Ohio Farm Bureau Federation was Nationwide's founding member). WRFD was originally aimed at the regional agricultural market (hence the use of RFD, or rural free delivery), and had its studios and transmitter located on East Powell Road in rural Delaware County, north of Columbus.

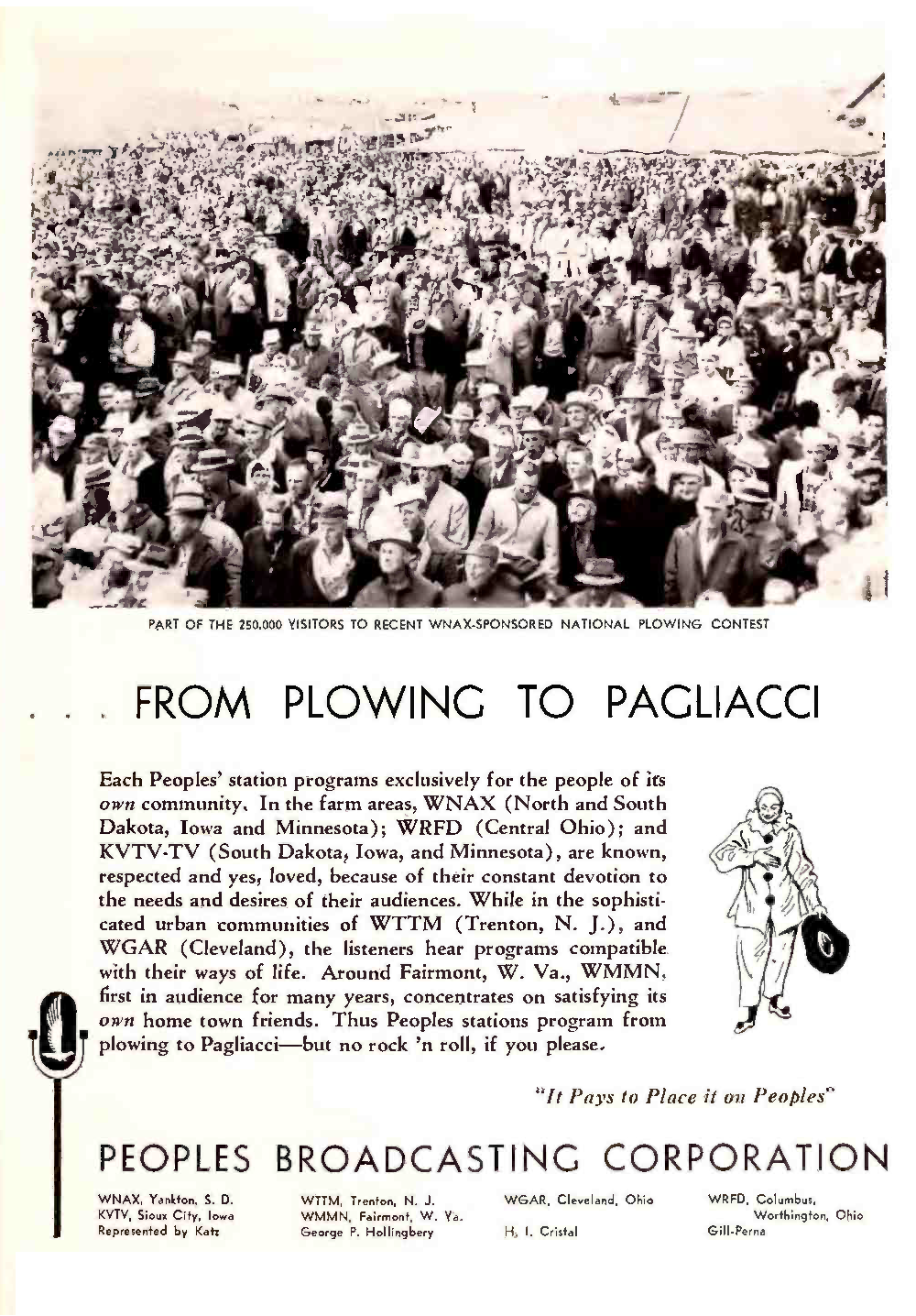
Advertisement for Peoples Broadcasting Corporation aka Nationwide Communications Corporation, later known as Nationwide Communications Corporation, a subsidiary of the Nationwide Mutual Insurance Co. (Note the Nationwide "eagle" logo inside the Peoples microphone logo)

WRFD held a construction permit for an FM station that actually was on the air for a period of time in the early 1950s. But few people owned FM receivers in those days and the license was turned in a short time later. In 1961, WRFD decided again to launch an FM station. WRFD-FM 97.9 had a classical music format. In 1967, it ended the classical format, becoming radio station WNCI, with the new call letters standing for parent company Nationwide Communications and Insurance. WRFD was later sold to Buckeye Media in 1974, which sold it to current owner Salem Communications in late 1981. During the 1970s WRFD was a "daytimer" that broadcast with 50,000 watts output and was off the air after sunset. They played Top 40 music, and featured a "Memorial Day 500", a countdown of the 500 most popular songs. In the 1980s to late 1990's, it broadcast with 500 watts pre-sunrise, 5,000 watts during critical hours (two hours after sunrise and before sunset), and a daytime power of 9,000 watts. Doug Leonard served as chief engineer for many years.

WRFD maintained a daily broadcast schedule of farm news and agribusiness information, which for many years was presented from 7:00 a.m. - 7:30 a.m. and again during the noon hour during the In the late '80s, the farm program adopted the brand Ohio Farm Radio.

One widely known WRFD farm broadcaster was Ed Johnson, who hosted the program from 1967 until 1972. Leaving WRFD, he founded The Agri Broadcasting Network (ABN) which he owned and operated until his death in February 2001. The longest serving Farm Director at the station during the Salem years was Joe Cornely, who broadcast weekday farm news and information until 1998, when he joined the Ohio Farm Bureau Federation staff. He was followed by Darrin Johnston, who was replaced in 2002 by Andy Vance who left Salem Communications in 2005 to found the Buckeye Ag Radio Network, and later acquire Johnson's ABN Radio.

Since February 1, 1982, WRFD has operated with a Christian talk, teaching, and music format. In the mid-1980's the station branded itself "Ohio's Power Station- Covering 80 of Ohio's 88 Counties". On air personalities at that time included Chuck Brown, Rick Dolezal, Boyce Lancaster, Bill DeWeese, Ann Rae, Scott Saunders, and Steve Lineberry. In 2024, Ann Rae is the longest serving on air host, followed by afternoon talker Bob Burney, who started out hosting a weekly Saturday morning talk show around 1991. After an extensive morning and early afternoon schedule of talk and teaching programs, the balance of the broadcast day consisted of Contemporary Christian Music of the more inspirational type. Featured artists included Keith Green, Sandi Patti, Michael Card, Harvest, Twila Paris, Steven Curtis Chapman, and many more.

During the 1990s more of the late afternoon and early evening broadcast hours were dedicated to talk programming. Starting in the spring and summer of 1992, "The Bible Answer Man" with Hank Hannegraff was broadcast for the first time, pushing music programming to after 7:00 p.m. on weekdays.

In 1994, Salem Media of Ohio purchased 103.1 FM WRZR, licensed to Johnstown, and began broadcasting a Contemporary Christian Music format 24/7 tagged "Joy FM". Salem eventually sold the station in early 1996. This effort continued the trend toward more talk and less music on WRFD.

By the late 90's, what little programming that remained on WRFD was Southern Gospel music which was heard only in the final hours of the long summer broadcast days, furnished by satellite delivery. No music programming remains today, as internet streaming and an FM translator eliminates the issue of evening time blocks being available only for the spring and summer months.

In 2005, Salem executives, with hopes of providing a more consistent programming schedule, decided to discontinue WRFD's agricultural programming.

== Current programming ==
Local programming on WRFD now includes Bob Burney Live on weekday afternoons, repeated overnight. On Saturdays, local programs include Listen to Your Money, Saving Face, and Saturday Live, hosted by Columbus radio veteran Tom Wiebell.

WRFD carries programs from national religious leaders, including Greg Laurie, Chuck Swindoll, Jim Daly, John MacArthur, J. Vernon McGee, Joni Eareckson Tada and David Jeremiah. Two secular conservative talk hosts are also heard, Jay Sekulow and Eric Metaxas. WRFD uses a brokered programming format, where hosts pay for their time on the air and may use their shows to seek donations to their ministries.

== Translator ==
Broadcast translator for WRFD
Call sign	Frequency	City of license	FID	ERP (W)	Class	Transmitter coordinates	FCC info
W283CL	104.5 FM	Columbus, Ohio	152209	250	D	39°56′14″N 83°1′16″W	LMS

== Notes ==
1. Nationwide Insurance and the Ohio Farm Bureau Federation have had a long and close relationship; Nationwide having originally been created by the farm bureau to meet the insurance needs of farmers.
