= WVMX =

Radio station in Westerville, Ohio

- Westerville, Ohio; United States
- Broadcast area: Columbus metropolitan area
- Frequency: 107.9 MHz (HD Radio)
- Branding: Mix 107.9

Programming
- Format: Hot adult contemporary
- Affiliations: Westwood One

Ownership
- Owner: Saga Communications; (Franklin Communications, Inc.)
- Sister stations: WLVQ; WNND; WNNP; WSNY

History
- First air date: 1991
- Former call signs: WCEZ (1991–1997); WLYR (1997–1998); WXST (1998-April 2001; May–July 2001); WJHT (April–May 2001); WODB (July 2001–2009)
- Call sign meaning: "Variety Mix"

Technical information
- Licensing authority: FCC
- Facility ID: 54556
- Class: A
- ERP: 3,000 watts
- HAAT: 143 meters (469 ft)
- Transmitter coordinates: 40°14′41.5″N 82°55′49.1″W

Links
- Public license information: Public file; LMS
- Webcast: Listen Live
- Website: mymix1079.com

WVMX (107.9 FM, "Mix 107.9") is a radio station broadcasting a hot adult contemporary format. Licensed to the suburb of Westerville, Ohio, United States, it serves the Columbus metropolitan area. The station is owned Saga Communications through licensee Franklin Communications, Inc., and operates as part of its Columbus Radio Group. Its studios are located in Upper Arlington and the transmitter site is west of Sunbury.

== History ==
The station was first assigned the WCEZ call sign on April 5, 1991 (as "Easy 108"). On April 11, 1997, the station changed the call sign to WLYR (as "Lite Rock 108").

=== WXST ===
107.9 operated as WXST "Star 107.9" from May 1998 until July 24, 2001, under owners Stop 26/Riverbend and played primarily Top 40-based 1980s music. WXST was widely credited as the first radio station in the U.S. to broadcast a 1980s-based format full-time. The web site for "Star 107.9" has been restored and now operates as a tribute site to the original WXST "Star 107.9", once again streaming 1980s hits, along with voice overs by the original DJs, biographies and detailed history of WXST "Star 107.9". The call sign was changed briefly to WJHT on April 23, 2001, but changed back to WXST less than a month later on May 16. The station was rumored to be switching to a CHR/Pop station as "Hot 107.9" at the time.

Before committing to 1980s music, WXST 'stunted' briefly by airing a freeform mix of music promoted on-air as the "Wheel of Formats".

The station switched to satelitte-based oldies after Columbus station WBNS-FM switched from oldies to hot adult contemporary. This switch left no FM oldies station in the Columbus metro area, so WXST quickly moved to fill this void. In the process, the Columbus area lost its only 1980s station. The WXST call letters now are assigned to STAR 99.7 in Charleston, South Carolina, but licensed by the FCC to the town of Hollywood. STAR 99.7 is an Urban Adult Contemporary formatted station.

The station was later sold to Saga Communications, which also owns AC WSNY 94.7 "Sunny 95", WNND 103.5, and WNNP 104.3.

=== WODB ===
WVMX previously broadcast a classic hits format as "B-107.9" playing music from the 1960s, 1970s, and occasionally 1980s (as WODB). The station also operated briefly as "Oldies 107.9" and "Oldies 108". The station's most recent slogan was "BIG Hits B-107.9", replacing the previous slogan "Feel Good Oldies All the Time." At first, WODB was playing songs from the late 1960s, 1970s, and 1980s with most of the music from the 1970s and 1980s. But not long after the switch they added more 1960s and early 1970s songs in the playlist and cut back on the 1980s songs.

On January 27, 2009 at Noon, Big Hits B-107.9 switched from a classic hits format to a hot adult contemporary format, calling itself Mix 107.9, playing 5,000 songs in a row. The switch was made the day after former MIX 97.1 (WBNS-FM) switched to a Sports simulcast of its AM sister station WBNS 1460 The Fan. The switch makes Saga the majority owner of the AC format in Columbus, with the exception of rival Clear Channel's Gold-Based AC WLZT "Lite 93.3".

=== WVMX ===
On February 2, 2009, the classic hits and BIG Hits format returned, at 104.3 FM in Richwood. On February 6, 2009, "Mix 107.9" changed call sign to WVMX with the WODB being reunited with the "BIG Hits" format on 104.3 FM.

During the summer of 2009, WVMX's city of license changed from Delaware to Westerville. Power was increased to 3,000 watts while transmitter height was lowered slightly. As the station is transmitting from the same tower as before, there was no change in coverage area.

On February 2, 2009, Mix 1079 re-positioned as "Today's Best Mix" and eliminated the 1980s from their playlist. This gave Mix a more adult top 40 sound competing against WNCI, while sister stations WODB/WJZA would later flip to "Rewind 103.5/104.3" WNND/WNNP, featuring a 1980s-based classic hits format (in effect returning the format WXST once pioneered back into the market).
