= WRKZ =

Active rock radio station in Columbus, Ohio

- Columbus, Ohio; United States
- Broadcast area: Columbus metro area
- Frequency: 99.7 MHz
- Branding: 99.7 The Blitz

Programming
- Format: Active rock

Ownership
- Owner: North American Broadcasting Company, Inc.
- Sister stations: WMNI, WJKR

History
- First air date: April 26, 1962
- Former call signs: WMNI-FM (1962–1980); WRMZ (1980–1986); WMGG (1986–1992); WBZX (1992–2008)
- Call sign meaning: "Rock"

Technical information
- Licensing authority: FCC
- Facility ID: 49107
- Class: B
- ERP: 20,000 watts
- HAAT: 239 meters (784 ft)
- Transmitter coordinates: 39°58′16.00″N 83°1′40.00″W

Links
- Public license information: Public file; LMS
- Webcast: Listen live
- Website: theblitz.com

WRKZ (99.7 FM) is a commercial radio station licensed to Columbus, Ohio, United States, and serving the Columbus metro area. Owned by the North American Broadcasting Company, it features an active rock format branded "99.7 The Blitz". The studios are on Dublin Road (U.S. Route 33).

The transmitter is on Twin Rivers Drive, sharing a tower with WCMH-TV.

== History ==
The station signed on the air on April 26, 1962. Its original call sign was WMNI-FM, the FM counterpart to WMNI 920 AM. The two stations mostly simulcast an easy listening format.

By 1978 the station's call letters were WRMZ and, in the early '80s, it started to broadcast a country music format. Joe Hill former OM of WHRI/KWHR/WHRA/WHME was there in 1983. From 1987 to 1992, the station was known as WMGG, Magic 99-7, and played classic rock.

The Blitz began at 4 p.m. on July 2, 1992. WBZX aired an active rock format. In morning drive time, it carried The Howard Stern Show, syndicated from New York City from 1997 to 2005.

On April 3, 2008, WBZX began stunting with radio static and a voice mentioning that the "station is rebooting". The last song played on The Blitz was Breaking Benjamin's "Until the End". The next day, at 5:00 P.M., WBZX relaunched as The Rock, along with the call letters changing to WRKZ. The new station premiered with Nirvana's "Smells Like Teen Spirit". The Rock still had the active rock format, but it focused less on new music and played popular rock music from the 1980s.

The station added the syndicated The Bob & Tom Show during the Morning Drive in December 2008.

During the last few months as The Rock, the station added rock songs from the '60s and '70s into its playlist, shifting it into a mainstream rock direction. Only a few months later, the station hosted its first-ever "Town Hall Meeting", with Program Director Hal Fish and on-air personalities Ronni Hunter and Blazor taking calls, emails and texts as to what Columbus area listeners wanted more and less of on 99.7. A week later, on April 1, 2010, they once again went to the airwaves and detailed an "Action Plan" as to what would happen on the station in the following weeks, including the return of such Blitz-era staples as "Choose It Or Lose It" as well as a showcase for local musical talent. In addition, a website was launched at blitzorrock.com to determine whether or not listeners wanted to keep the station named The Rock or for The Blitz to make a return.

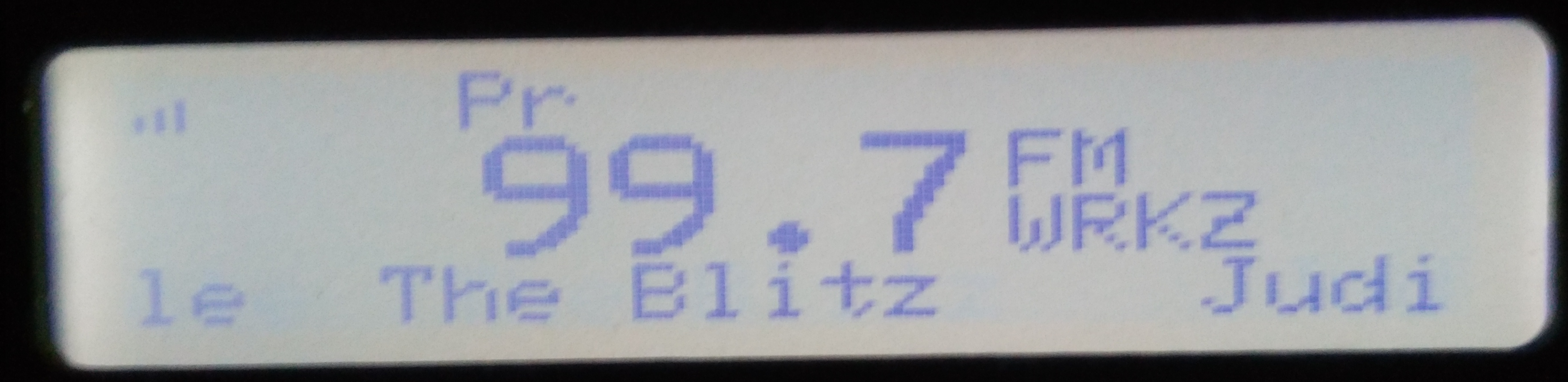
WRKZ on a SPARC HD Radio with RDS

On April 22, 2010, at a "Blitz or Rock Reveal Party" it was announced that the station would be once again called The Blitz. It premiered with Mudvayne's "Happy?", followed by Disturbed's "Down with the Sickness". Along with the changes, it was also announced that The Bob & Tom Show would be dropped in a few weeks and be replaced by a local morning show. The show that replaced it was Blazor and Mo in the morning, which ironically was the same show that Bob & Tom replaced in December 2008.

In early December 2011, Mo (Maurice Jovan) was no longer on the air. On February 6, 2012, Mark Blazor resigned.
