= Columbus Messenger =

Newspaper in Columbus, Ohio

Columbus Messenger Newspapers
- Type: Bi-weekly newspaper
- Format: Tabloid
- Publisher: Philip F. Daubel
- Managing editor: Rick Palsgrove
- Founded: 1974
- Ceased publication: 2025
- Headquarters: Columbus Office; 3500 Sullivant Ave. Columbus, Ohio 43204; United States; London Office; 78 S. Main St. London, Ohio 43140; United States
- Circulation: Every other, Sunday; 21,135 Eastside; 20,070 Southeast; 20,297 Southwest; 24,766 Westside; 14,581 Madison
- Website: www.columbusmessenger.com

Columbus Messenger Newspapers was a bi-weekly suburban newspaper chain started in 1974. It published six free or by subscription, independently owned newspapers: the Westside Messenger, the South and Canal Winchester Messenger, the Groveport Messenger, the Grove City Messenger, and the Madison Messenger, covering communities around Columbus, Ohio, and Madison County.

Each of the six papers published every other Sunday and feature happenings with local government, community organizations and human interest stories.

Columbus Messenger ceased on April 11, 2025.

== Canal Winchester edition ==
The Canal Winchester Messenger covers Canal Winchester and is distributed to homes in the Canal Winchester school district, includes drop sites at local businesses and libraries.

== Groveport edition ==
The Groveport Messenger covers Groveport and Obetz and distributed to all Groveport Madison School District homes as well as the city of Obetz.

== Grove City edition ==
The Grove City Messenger Covering all of City of Grove City and Commercial Point.

== Westside edition ==
The Westside Messenger Covering Lincoln Village, Prairie Twp., Westgate, Galloway.

== Madison County edition ==
The Madison Messenger covers Madison County, Ohio, including London, Mount Sterling, West Jefferson, South Solon, Sedalia, Summerford and all rural routes, and distributed to ZIP codes 43140, 43143, 43162, 43153, 43151 and 43064. The Madison Messenger also goes to South Charleston in Clark County the first Monday of each month.
