= WXGT =

Radio station in Columbus, Ohio

Simulcasting WVXG Mount Gilead
- Columbus, Ohio; United States
- Broadcast area: Columbus metropolitan area
- Frequency: 1580 kHz
- Branding: Classic Rock 95X WVXG

Programming
- Format: Classic rock

Ownership
- Owner: ICS Communications, Inc.
- Sister stations: WDLR; WQCD; WVXG

History
- First air date: December 29, 1951
- Former call signs: WVKO (1951–2020); WMYC (2020); WWCD (2020–2024)

Technical information
- Licensing authority: FCC
- Facility ID: 22341
- Class: B
- Power: 3,200 watts (day); 290 watts (night)
- Transmitter coordinates: 40°3′42″N 82°56′41″W
- Translator: 92.9 W225CS (Columbus)
- Repeater: 1550 WQCD (Delaware)

Links
- Public license information: Public file; LMS
- Webcast: Listen live
- Website: delmarmediagroup.com/radio/wvxg/

WXGT (1580 AM) is a commercial classic rock radio station licensed to serve Columbus, Ohio, owned by ICS Communications, Inc. The station's studios are located in Downtown Lewis Center, in the Lewis Center Metroplex, while the station transmitter is located in Columbus' Brandywine neighborhood on Morse Road.

In addition to a standard analog transmission, WXGT is relayed over low-power analog Columbus translator W225CS (92.9 FM), as well as WQCD (1550 AM) in Delaware, Ohio; WQCD also operates its own translator, W225CM (92.9 FM). As WXGT and WQCD's translators are both on the 92.9 frequency, the stations collectively brand as "93X". WXGT is also available online.

== History ==
Originally WVKO, the station signed on on December 29, 1951, under the ownership of Skyway Broadcasting. Unlike most AM stations of the time, WVKO actually went on the air three years after its FM sister station, WVKO-FM (94.7). Both stations lasted under common ownership for the next thirty years, as WVKO-FM primarily simulcast the programming of its AM sister station until August 6, 1982, where it went into separate programming as WSNY. Both stations were sold by Skyway Broadcasting to Franklin Communications—now a part of Saga Communications—in January 1982 for $3 million.

From 1963 until 1997, WVKO was an R&B/Soul music station, its tagline being "The Rhythm of The City". It was during this time that WVKO employed Ted Williams as an overnight disc jockey; Williams gained fame in 2011 when, while homeless, he was discovered by a videographer for the Columbus Dispatch and a video featuring his "golden radio voice" went viral on the Internet. Ted briefly returned to the station as the morning show host in January 2016.

In the mid-1980s, WVKO received Federal Communications Commission (FCC) permission to broadcast around the clock, using lower power after sunset.

WVKO dropped its soul/R&B format in early February 1997 and switched to an urban gospel music format, while also airing a variety of sermon-based shows featuring local and national religious leaders during the daytime and evening hours. In 2005, the gospel format was modified to airing only between the hours of 6 a.m. and 6 p.m. on weekdays and Sundays, with R&B, soul, and southern blues airing during the evening and overnight hours and on Saturdays, interspersed with various local talk and information programs aimed at the African-American community. It was also the broadcast outlet for the Columbus Clippers minor league baseball team.

WVKO went off the air on May 5, 2006, due to the soon-to-expire transmitter land lease, and major financial issues incurred by both the station and its previous owner, Youngstown-based Stop 26 Riverbend; the license was transferred on January 22, 2007, to Bernard Ohio LLC, following a period under the supervision of a bankruptcy trustee, despite some formal objections filed with the FCC. The station moved to another transmitter site in March 2007, at which point it returned to the air with reduced power under a special temporary authority.

On December 6, 2007, WVKO debuted a progressive talk radio format, mostly carrying programming from the Air America radio network; local programming included Fight Back hosted by Dr. Robert Fitrakis; and Blue State Diner hosted by Michael Alwood. In late May 2008, WVKO openly began soliciting listeners for cash donations due to both a lack of advertiser support and increased rent for the studios.

St. Gabriel Radio entered into a local marketing agreement in December 2008 to program WVKO, with the progressive talk being dropped on December 23 in favor of Catholic radio programming in a simulcast with Marysville-licensed WUCO (1270 AM), which St. Gabriel had owned since 2005; WUCO would also be divested. This arrangement continued until September 9, 2011, when St. Gabriel purchased WOSU (820 AM) from the Ohio State University for $2 million; the sale was approved on November 7 by the FCC. St. Gabriel moved their programming to the renamed WVSG on December 17 and ended their lease of WVKO on December 20.

WVKO returned to progressive talk on January 2, 2012; again, due to a lack of advertiser support, the station's format changed again on December 17 to urban gospel branded as "The Praise". It and WVKO-FM (103.1) were sold to TSJ Radio, LLC effective December 19, 2014, at a price of $743,750.

On March 4, 2018, under a local marketing agreement with Sandblast LP, the format was once again modified from all gospel music to the format it had from 2005 to 2006, with gospel music and Christian talk programming airing on Sundays and during the weekday daytime hours, plus R&B, soul, southern blues, and public affairs talk programming airing on Saturdays and during the evening and overnight hours on weeknights. In February 2019, Sandblast LP exercised its option to purchase WVKO from TSJ Radio for $250,000; the deal never closed, and TSJ retook control of both stations, in addition to purchasing translator W225CS (92.9 FM) from Sandblast LP for $30,000 excluding deducted unpaid obligations of $26,277.50.

On July 15, 2020, WVKO changed its format from urban adult contemporary to a simulcast of Delaware-based classic hits station WDLR (1550 AM). On July 28, 2020, the station changed its call sign to WMYC; that September, the two stations rebranded as "My 92.9". Effective October 28, 2020, TSJ Radio sold WMYC and translator W225CS to ICS Communications, Inc.

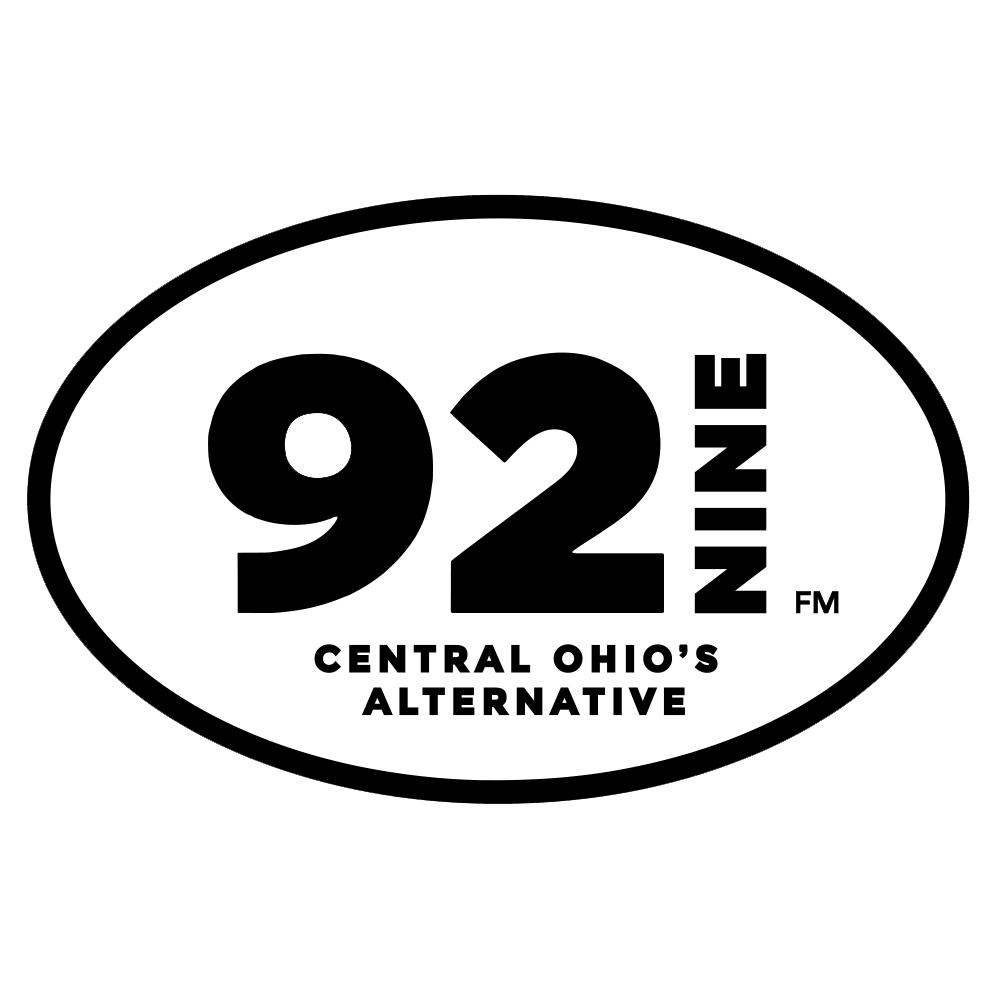
Logo as "CD 92.9"

The simulcast with WDLR was temporarily broken on November 21, 2020, when WMYC flipped to alternative rock as "CD 92.9", under the operation of Randy Malloy's WWCD Limited. Concurrent with the change, it was announced that "CD 92.9" would begin airing on WDLR on January 1, 2021. The "CD" programming had previously aired on 101.1 FM (now WOSA) from 1990 to 2010, and then on 102.5 FM (now WKVR) until the lease of that frequency expired on November 1, it had continued as an Internet radio station until the agreement with WMYC. On December 8, 2020, the WWCD call sign, formerly used on 101.1 and 102.5, was assigned to the station.

On January 5, 2024, it was announced by WWCD, Ltd. that the "CD 92.9" brand and format would become an online-only station on January 31, 2024. On February 1, Delmar Media launched an in-house alternative rock format on WWCD and WQCD as "93X". WWCD also changed its call sign to WXGT, which had previously been used on what is now WCOL-FM from 1978 to 1990. Delmar announced that the first ten days of "93X" would be commercial-free, and that the station would carry news updates from ABC News Radio. This format again switched again to an oldies format on March 8, 2024, again as "My 92.9"; Delmar continued to use the "My" branding in the Delaware area on WDLR (1270 AM). The online-only WWCD ceased operations on April 28, 2024, after a failed attempt to license the WWCD intellectual property with iHeartMedia's WXZX (105.7 FM).

On March 18, 2025, WXGT changed their format from oldies to Spanish tropical, branded as "Rumba 92.9". The formst was only temporary, as WXGT flipped to regional Mexican as "La Grande 92.9" on April 1.

On January 20, 2026, WXGT dropped the Spanish format, and began relaying WVXG.

=== FM translator ===
Since August 2017, WXGT has simulcast on low-power Columbus translator W225CS (92.9 FM), and re-branded itself "92.9 The Drum" in November 2019. As of November 21, 2020, the station has been branded as "CD 92.9 FM", the third incarnation of the station that began as "CD101" in 1990, and became "CD102.5" in 2010.

Broadcast translator for WXGT
Callsign	Frequency	City of license	Facility ID	ERP	HAAT	Class	Transmitter coordinates
W225CS	92.9 MHz	Columbus	142648	250 watts	150 meters (490 ft)	D	39°57′39.90″N 83°0′3.40″W
