= WWLA (FM) =

Radio station in Johnstown–Columbus, Ohio

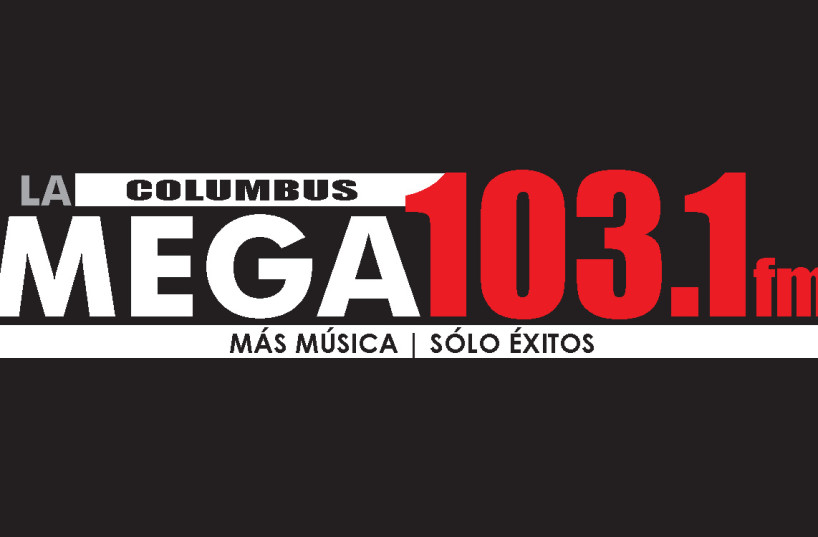
- Johnstown, Ohio; United States
- Broadcast area: Columbus, Ohio; Newark, Ohio
- Frequency: 103.1 MHz
- Branding: La Mega 103.1/107.1

Programming
- Format: Spanish AC/Regional Mexican

Ownership
- Owner: La Mega Media, Inc; (Lazo Media LLC)

History
- First air date: July 29, 1975; 51 years ago
- Former call signs: WWWJ (1975–1988); WXLE (1988–1991); WRZR (1991–1995); WTJY (1995–1996); WSMZ (1996–2004); WVKO-FM (2004–2024)
- Call sign meaning: "La Mega"

Technical information
- Licensing authority: FCC
- Facility ID: 58633
- Class: A
- ERP: 1,600 watts
- HAAT: 135 meters (443 ft)
- Transmitter coordinates: 40°13′44.2″N 82°39′35.4″W
- Repeater: 107.1 WWLG (Circleville)

Links
- Public license information: Public file; LMS
- Webcast: Listen live
- Website: columbus.lamegamedia.com

WWLA (103.1 FM, "La Mega 103.1") is a Spanish language radio station playing Spanish adult contemporary and some regional Mexican music. WWLA is licensed by the Federal Communications Commission (FCC) to serve the community of Johnstown, Ohio. It is owned by Lazo Media LLC. and simulcast full-time over Urban One-owned WWLG in Circleville.

== History ==
The station was first licensed, as WWWJ, on July 29, 1975.

According to filings with the FCC, the station, then WVKO-FM, ceased broadcasting on May 5, 2006, as the license holder was in bankruptcy. In January 2007, the station license was transferred to Bernard Ohio LLC. The FCC granted permission to resume operations on June 19, 2007.

Bernard Radio is a company that operates several radio stations on behalf of the D.B. Zwirn investment fund. The Zwirn hedge fund was attempting to sell off the radio stations in its portfolio in order to terminate the fund.

WVKO-FM and WVKO were sold to TSJ Radio, LLC effective December 19, 2014, at a price of $743,750. On March 4, 2019, WVKO-FM was sold to Lazo Media LLC.

On November 1, 2024, as part of an arrangement with operator La Mega Media, the station would begin simulcasting on Urban One owned station WJYD; with the move, the station would take on new callsign WWLA, with WJYD eventually assuming the WWLG callsign to match.

== On-air staff ==
- Marisela Juarez
- Gil Garcia
- Gustavo Aguilar
