= WVXG =

Radio station in Mount Gilead, Ohio

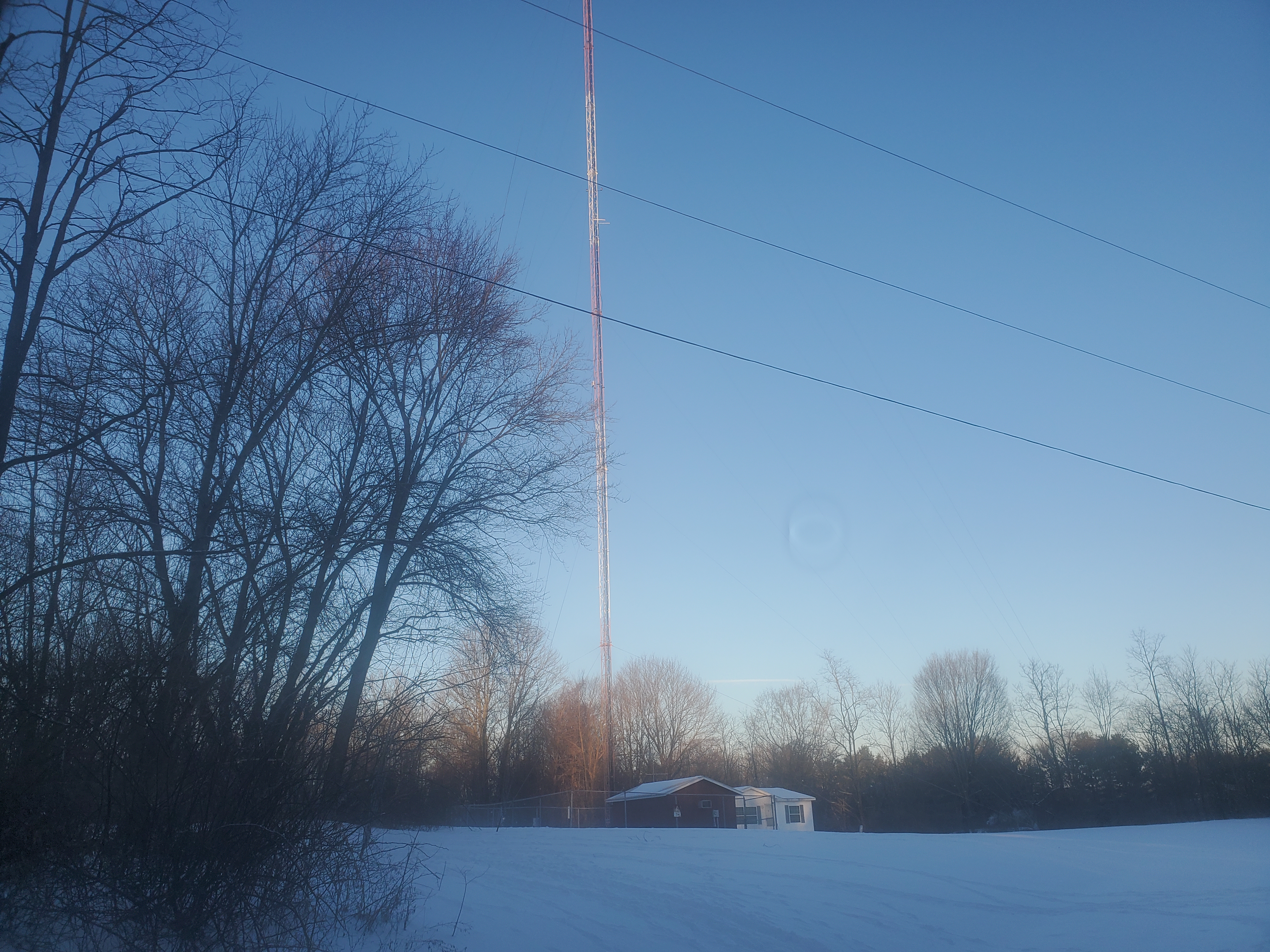
- WVXG Antenna
- Mount Gilead, Ohio; United States
- Broadcast area: Mid-Ohio
- Frequency: 95.1 MHz
- Branding: Classic Rock 95X WVXG

Programming
- Format: Classic rock
- Affiliations: ABC News Radio; Westwood One

Ownership
- Owner: Brent Casagrande; (Delmar Communications, Inc.)
- Sister stations: WQCD, WDLR

History
- First air date: March 8, 1991
- Former call signs: WOHO (1991–1993)
- Call sign meaning: Voice of Xavier in Mount Gilead (former simulcast of WXVU; both stations were previously owned and operated by Xavier University)

Technical information
- Licensing authority: FCC
- Facility ID: 74300
- Class: A
- ERP: 6,000 watts
- HAAT: 100 meters (330 ft)
- Transmitter coordinates: 40°35′15.00″N 82°48′20.00″W

Links
- Public license information: Public file; LMS
- Webcast: Listen live
- Website: WVXG Online

WVXG (95.1 FM, "Classic Rock 95X") is a radio station licensed to serve Mount Gilead, Ohio, United States. The station is owned by Brent Casagrande, through licensee Delmar Communications, Inc., and serves the Mid-Ohio area. WVXG broadcasts a classic rock music format. The station is the local affiliate for The Bob and Tom Show, while the majority of the programming comes from the satellite-fed The Classic Rock Experience from ABC Radio Networks.

== History ==
Former logo

The station was assigned the call letters WOHO on March 8, 1991. On October 22, 1993, the station changed its call sign to the current WVXG. Throughout the 1990s and into the early 2000s, WVXG was owned by Xavier University and was a member of the "X-Star Radio Network," which featured a variety of programs, including news, talk, jazz, and adult standards. This multi-state network was originally based at flagship WVXU in Cincinnati, even as WVXU had adopted a separate program schedule.

One year before the sale of WVXU and the shutdown of the X-Star Radio Network, Xavier spun off WVXG to ICS Holdings, Inc. for around $385,000. ICS Holdings entered a licensing agreement with the Christian Voice of Central Ohio, who broadcast a Contemporary Christian music format from 2004 through March 2008 as "95.1 The River," patterned directly after WCVO. Christian Voice of Central Ohio continues the format online and on Chillicothe, Ohio-licensed WZCP (also a former X-Star affiliate as WVXC).

After the lease agreement with the Christian Voice of Central Ohio ended on March 18, 2008, ICS flipped WVXG to a satellite-based classic rock format.

ICS Holdings sold WVXG, along with WQTT and WDLR, to Delmar Communications, Inc. effective December 30, 2014. The price for the transaction was $250,000.

Previous logo
