= WLVQ =

Radio station in Columbus, Ohio

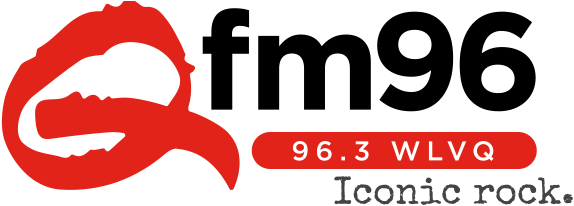
- Columbus, Ohio; United States
- Broadcast area: Columbus metropolitan area
- Frequency: 96.3 MHz (HD Radio)
- Branding: Qfm 96

Programming
- Format: Classic rock
- Affiliations: Westwood One

Ownership
- Owner: Saga Communications; (Franklin Communications, Inc.)
- Sister stations: WNND; WNNP; WSNY; WVMX

History
- First air date: April 1, 1959
- Former call signs: WTVN-FM (1959–1966, 1974–1977); WBUK (1966–1974)
- Call sign meaning: Mirrors former sister station WTVN

Technical information
- Licensing authority: FCC
- Facility ID: 11277
- Class: B
- ERP: 18,000 watts
- HAAT: 229 meters (751 ft)
- Transmitter coordinates: 39°58′16.00″N 83°1′40.00″W

Links
- Public license information: Public file; LMS
- Webcast: Listen live
- Website: qfm96.com

WLVQ (96.3 FM, "Q-FM 96") is a commercial classic rock radio station in Columbus, Ohio, United States. Owned by Saga Communications, and operated as part of its Columbus Radio Group, the station serves the Columbus metro area. The WLVQ studios are located in Upper Arlington, OH, and the station transmitter is in Columbus on the Twin Rivers Drive tower.

== History ==
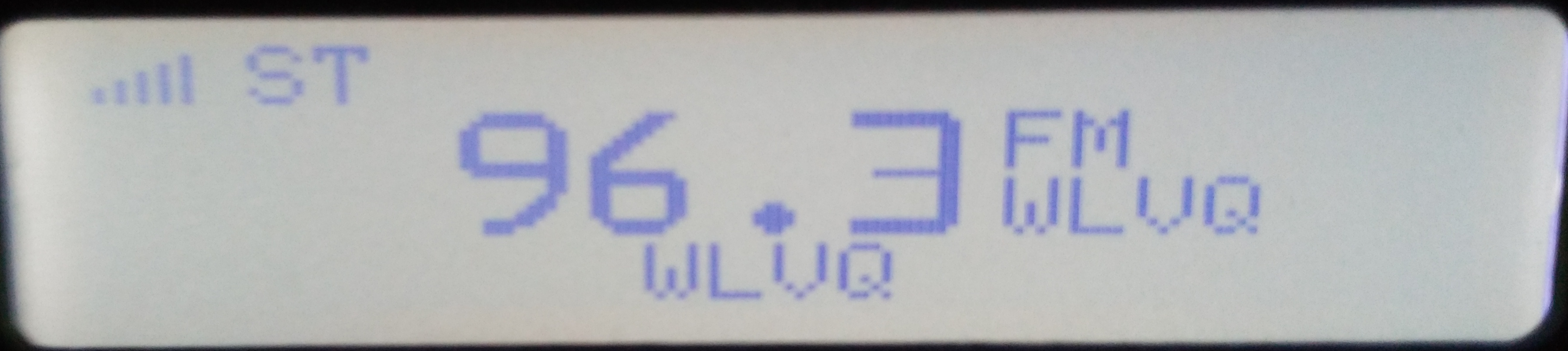
WLVQ on a SPARC HD Radio with RDS.

The 96.3 MHz frequency was first occupied by WLWF, a station owned by the Crosley Broadcasting Corporation along with sister station WLWC (now WCMH-TV); WLWF broadcast from 1949–1953. WLVQ itself began on April 1, 1959, as WTVN-FM, owned by Taft Broadcasting Company along with sister stations WTVN and WTVN-TV (now WSYX). In 1966, WTVN-FM changed its callsign to WBUK and format to adult contemporary. The station again switched formats and started playing "beautiful music" (easy listening) in 1969. The station reverted to the WTVN-FM call sign in 1974, but continued to play "beautiful music".

The station adopted the WLVQ call sign on February 14, 1977. The first song played was "New Kid in Town" by the Eagles. For many years the station's mascot was The Q Kangaroo, a creature selected by a listener in a contest. Q-FM-96 was an early champion of, and outlet for, Columbus's vibrant rock music community, and was particularly notable for its "Hometown Album Project", a series of compilation LPs featuring local artists, which debuted shortly after the station signed on. Another program in the 1980s was the Sunday morning show "Psychedelic Sunday," showcasing 1960s-era rock, much of it relatively obscure, and hosted by British DJ Russell Carey. Sunday nights saw the Jazz Hour, hosted by Mike Eiland, which was heavy on jazz fusion and instrumental rock ("close enough for jazz" according to Eiland); listener favorites included Gamalon and Joe Satriani.

On November 4, 2015, Saga Communications announced it had agreed to purchase WLVQ from Wilks Broadcast Group. Saga owns and operates Columbus stations WSNY, WVMX, WNND and WNNP through its Franklin Communications, Inc. subsidiary. The purchase by Saga was consummated on February 3, 2016, at a price of $13 million.

== Current programming ==
Currently WLVQ/Q-FM-96 airs the Torg & Elliott morning show; Scott Torgerson and Jerry Elliott. Long time morning host Mark "Daddy Wags" Wagner is retired. Jerry Elliott and Kristie Kemper joined The Morning Show in 1990, Torg joined the show in 2013. Jerry was a stand-up comedian, Kristie came from the morning show at WAZU/Dayton, OH, and Torg, former afternoon drive personality on sports WBNS-FM/97.1 The Fan. Kristie Kemper also handles mid-days along with the Iconic Nooner feature. Archie steers the ship through afternoons with features like the 4:20 Haircut & the Joe Show Drive at Five on Fridays. In September 2022 “DaveMan” returned to Qfm96 after 16 years to take over evenings from Doug Risher who accepted a new position on Nantucket Island.
