= WSNY =

Radio station in Columbus, Ohio

- Columbus, Ohio; United States
- Broadcast area: Central Ohio
- Frequency: 94.7 MHz (HD Radio)
- Branding: Sunny 95

Programming
- Format: Adult contemporary
- Affiliations: Premiere Networks

Ownership
- Owner: Saga Communications; (Franklin Communications, Inc.)
- Sister stations: WLVQ; WNND; WNNP; WVMX

History
- First air date: November 11, 1948
- Former call signs: WVKO-FM (1948–1983)
- Call sign meaning: We're SuNnY 95 FM!

Technical information
- Licensing authority: FCC
- Facility ID: 22339
- Class: B
- ERP: 22,000 watts
- HAAT: 230 meters (750 ft)
- Transmitter coordinates: 39°58′16.0″N 83°01′40.0″W

Links
- Public license information: Public file; LMS
- Webcast: Listen live
- Website: www.sunny95.com

WSNY (94.7 FM) is a commercial radio station in Columbus, Ohio, United States. It airs an adult contemporary radio format and is owned by Saga Communications, operating as part of its Columbus Radio Group. From mid-November until the Christmas holidays, WSNY switches to Christmas music. CBS affiliate WBNS-TV's meteorologists supply WSNY with weather reports. The station's studios and offices are on Carriage Hill Lane in Columbus.

WSNY has an effective radiated power (ERP) of 22,000 watts and can be heard throughout Central Ohio. Its transmitter site is northwest of Downtown Columbus off Twin Rivers Drive near Interstate 670. WSNY broadcasts in the HD Radio hybrid format.

== History ==
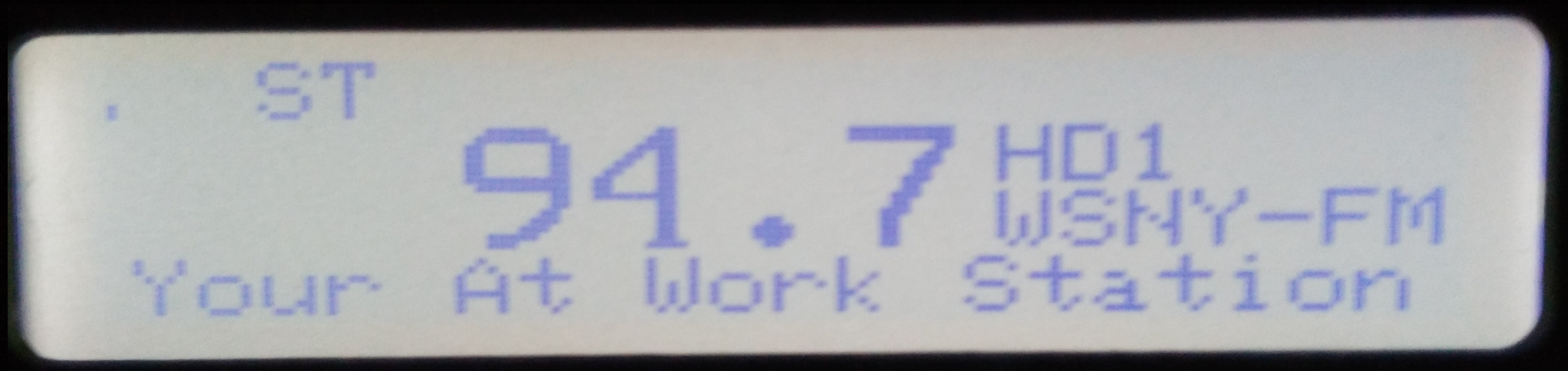
WSNY's HD Radio Channel on a SPARC Radio with PSD.

On November 11, 1948, the station first signed on as WVKO. Initially, it was a stand-alone FM station, not associated with any AM or TV station. It was owned by Skyway Broadcasting and had studios on South 3rd Street. It added a sister station in 1951, WVKO (1580 AM, now WXGT). Most of its early days, WVKO-AM-FM served Columbus' Black community, with R&B music.

The station began broadcasting a soft adult contemporary format on August 6, 1982, when DJ Chuck Martin played The Beatles, "Here Comes the Sun" as the first song to launch "Sunny 95." It acquired the call sign WSNY to go with its Sunny branding.

Tom Collins, who consulted several Josephson International stations, was the Program Director who launched the new AC format for WSNY. The new jock lineup included long time Columbus radio personality Chuck Martin (from WVKO and WCOL) as morning host and Tony Michaels in mid-days. Bob Nunnally soon joined as morning show host as Chuck Martin moved to afternoon drive. Bob Simpson began his morning drive hosting duties in 1986 and Nunnally moved to afternoon drive.

Other notable personalities in the early "Sunny 95" days include Bob Lewis, Bob Nunnally, Tony Michaels and Perry Joos. Within the first year, legendary urban programmer Harry Lyles replaced Tom Collins as station Program Director. General Manager Steve Joos introduced computerized music research and an effective listener focus group program.

From the late 1990s through the 2010s, Dino Tripodis and Stacy McKay were the morning team, hosting "Sunny in the Morning with Dino & Stacy" for more than 20 years. In June 2018, Tripodis announced his departure from the station after 24 years on-air at WSNY. However, Tripodis returned to WSNY in July 2021 after a three-year hiatus to co-host with McKay in mornings. Both left in April 2024 and a new show debuted in place Their current show is known as "Randi & Rice."

Former logo
