= WCKX =

Radio station in Columbus, Ohio

- Columbus, Ohio; United States
- Broadcast area: Columbus, Ohio
- Frequency: 107.5 MHz (HD Radio)
- Branding: Power 107.5

Programming
- Format: Urban contemporary

Ownership
- Owner: Urban One; (Blue Chip Broadcasting Licenses, Ltd)
- Sister stations: WJYD, WXMG, WWLG

History
- First air date: 1993 (as WJZA)
- Former call signs: WJZA (1993–1997)
- Call sign meaning: "Country Kix", from previous country music format

Technical information
- Licensing authority: FCC
- Facility ID: 27645
- Class: A
- ERP: 1,900 watts
- HAAT: 126 meters (413 ft)
- Transmitter coordinates: 39°57′46.00″N 82°59′46.00″W

Links
- Public license information: Public file; LMS
- Webcast: Listen live
- Website: www.mycolumbuspower.com

WCKX (107.5 FM), known on air as "Power 107.5", "Power 107,” or simply “Power” is a radio station broadcasting a hip hop-leaning urban contemporary format. The station is licensed to and serves the Columbus, Ohio metropolitan area. It first began broadcasting in 1993 under the call sign WJZA. The station is currently owned by Radio One, and highly influenced by the BlackPlanet social networking site. The station serves as the sister station to WHTD. Its studios are located just north of downtown, but the transmitter is located in downtown atop the Borden Building. The two station carries the syndicated The Morning Hustle with Kyle and L’Oreal, weekdays from 6 to 10 a.m, as well as Posted on the Corner with Incognito and DJ Misses from 7 p.m to midnight.

== Station history ==
WCKX was originally assigned the WJZA call sign on November 23, 1993. On December 29, 1997, the WCKX call sign assigned to 106.3 MHz ("Power 106") in London, Ohio (now WJYD) was reassigned to 107.5 FM, while the WJZA call sign was dropped and later picked up by 103.5 FM in Pickerington ("Smooth Jazz 103.5 FM").

Since 2014, WCKX competes directly with iHeartMedia's urban WZCB.

On November 28, 2017, at 10 a.m., WCKX began simulcasting with sister station WBMO, and rebranded as "Power 107.5/106.3". On November 1, 2024, WCKX dropped the simulcast with sister station WHTD, and reverted to simply being "Power 107.5".
