= Ed Johnson (broadcaster) =

American broadcaster

Ed Johnson (born G. Edwin Johnson) was the founder of Agri Communicators, Inc., the parent company of the Agri Broadcast Network (ABN).

== Career ==
Johnson was the founder, president, and CEO of Agri Communicators Inc., which included the Agri Broadcasting Network (ABN Radio), Ohio's Country Journal, a monthly farm newspaper, and the television program AgriCountry. Following Johnson's death in 2001, the family sold the ABN to Clear Channel Communications, who moved network operations from Columbus and merged the network and programming into its Lima, Ohio cluster.

In early 2007, AdVance Broadcast & Communication Ltd, parent company of the Buckeye Ag Radio Network acquired the ABN, reintroduced Johnson's well-known preference for broadcasting "from the farm," and in early 2009 returned broadcast operations to Columbus.

The network evolved out of Johnson's daily reports aired on Columbus radio station WRFD from 1967 to 1972. Leaving the station, he founded the ABN and ran it from his kitchen table in 1972. His weekend television program, Agri Country, aired on 11 television stations across Ohio until its cancellation in 2001 as part of the ABN sale. The program aired over 1,000 episodes over its twenty-year run.

== "From the Farm, Good Morning!" ==
His morning radio show was broadcast from his farm in Ostrander (Delaware County). In 1972, he started the ABN and his daily reports were eventually broadcast to over 72 radio stations across Ohio, Indiana, and West Virginia. Known for his infectious enthusiasm and passion for agriculture, Johnson always opened his broadcast with the trademark phrase "From the Farm, Good Morning!", followed by the crow of his legendary rooster sidekick, Abner.

Another staple of the Johnson years was the use of ABN "Stinger." This brief banjo riff was used as a sounder at the beginning of each ABN broadcast. Clear Channel discontinued the use of the stinger after acquiring ABN.

== Death ==
Johnson survived a heart attack in the mid-1990s. Dedicated to his work, he was back at the microphone just days after his surgery. He suffered a massive heart attack in February 2001 and died at the age of 63.

Johnson was honored posthumously for his work by the National Association of Farm Broadcasting in 2005 with enshrinement in the NAFB Hall of Fame.

Marilyn Johnson still resided in Delaware County until her death in 2021.
