= WMNI =

Radio station in Columbus, Ohio

- Columbus, Ohio; United States
- Broadcast area: Columbus metropolitan area
- Frequency: 920 kHz
- Branding: Fox Sports 920

Programming
- Format: Sports
- Affiliations: Fox Sports Radio; Columbus Clippers; Notre Dame Fighting Irish football

Ownership
- Owner: North American Broadcasting Company, Inc.
- Sister stations: WJKR; WRKZ

History
- First air date: April 26, 1958
- Call sign meaning: Founder William R. Mnich; "Music, News, Information"

Technical information
- Licensing authority: FCC
- Facility ID: 49110
- Class: B
- Power: 1,000 watts (day); 500 watts (night)
- Transmitter coordinates: 39°53′32″N 83°02′51″W
- Repeater: 103.9 WJKR-HD3 (Worthington)

Links
- Public license information: Public file; LMS
- Webcast: Listen live
- Website: foxsports920.com

WMNI (920 AM) is a commercial radio station licensed to Columbus, Ohio, known as "Fox Sports 920" with a sports format. Locally owned by North American Broadcasting Company, Inc., WMNI serves the Columbus metropolitan area. WMNI's studios are located in Marble Cliff, Ohio, using a Columbus address, while the transmitter resides in Grove City. In addition to a standard analog transmission, WMNI is available online.

== Programming ==
In addition to its sports talk format, WMNI carries a number of local and national sports events, including the Indy 500, the Brickyard 400, Notre Dame college football and Columbus Clippers Triple A baseball.

On Saturday and Sunday mornings, WMNI features talk shows such as "Plant Talk with Fred Hower" and "At Home With Gary Sullivan" as well as some paid brokered programming. WMNI carries news updates from Fox News Radio.

== History ==
On April 26, 1958, WMNI first signed on the air. For most of its three decades, it had a full service, country radio format. As country music listening started to move from AM to FM in the 1980s, WMNI switched to a satellite-delivered adult standards format from Westwood One. By the late 1990s, much of the music was locally programmed using Columbus-based disc jockeys. As of August 2007, WMNI shifted back to Westwood One's "America's Best Music" format, a mix of soft oldies and standards.

On June 14, 2012 at 6:00 a.m., WMNI switched to a simulcast of WMNI-FM, which had flipped from a classic hits sound as WTDA-FM to a news format.

On July 18, 2013, the AM/FM simulcast ended, with WMNI returning to the soft oldies and adult standards format.

On June 12, 2017, WMNI changed their format from adult standards to soft adult contemporary music, branded as "Easy 95.1 & 920" (simulcast on FM translator W236CZ 95.1 FM Columbus).

On June 14, 2022, WMNI changed their format from soft adult contemporary to sports, branded as "Fox Sports 920", with programming from Fox Sports Radio. The 95.1 translator switched to a relay of sister station WJKR's HD2 subchannel.

== Previous logo ==
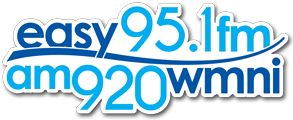
