= WXMG (FM) =

Radio station in Lancaster, Ohio

Lancaster, Ohio; United States
- Broadcast area: Columbus metropolitan area
- Frequency: 95.5 MHz
- Branding: Magic 95.5

Programming
- Format: Urban adult contemporary

Ownership
- Owner: Urban One; (Blue Chip Broadcasting Licenses, Ltd.)
- Sister stations: WCKX, WJYD, WWLG

History
- First air date: December 1958; 66 years ago as WHOK-FM
- Former call signs: WHOK-FM (1948–1981); WHOK (1981–1995); WHOK-FM (1995–2013); WZOH-FM (2013–2015)

Technical information
- Licensing authority: FCC
- Facility ID: 72311
- Class: B
- ERP: 21,000 watts
- HAAT: 232 meters (761 ft)
- Transmitter coordinates: 39°40′32.0″N 82°40′34.0″W

Links
- Public license information: Public file; LMS
- Webcast: Listen live
- Website: www.mycolumbusmagic.com

WXMG (95.5 MHz "Magic 95.5") is a commercial FM radio station licensed to Lancaster, Ohio, and serving the Columbus metropolitan area. It is owned by Urban One and broadcasts an urban adult contemporary radio format. WXMG carries nationally syndicated shows from Rickey Smiley, D.L. Hughley and Al B. Sure! The radio studios and offices are on East First Avenue in Columbus.

WXMG's effective radiated power (ERP) is 21,000 watts. The transmitter is on Stoney Hill Road SW in Delmont, Ohio, near U.S. Route 22.

== Station history ==
=== Country (1958–2013) ===
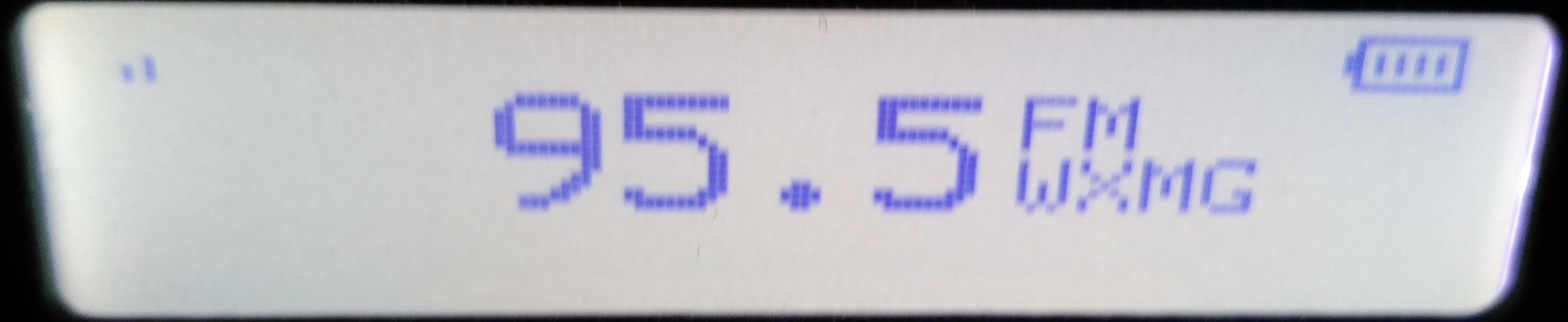
WXMG on a SPARC HD Radio with RDS.

The station first went on the air in December 1958 as WHOK-FM, making it one of Central Ohio's oldest FM stations. It was the FM counterpart to WHOK (1320 AM, now WLOH). For decades, WHOK-FM was a country music station, using the "K95.5" moniker. From September 7, 2003, to January 8, 2007, WHOK-FM played mainly classic country as "Country Legends K95.5".

The relaunch of the station in January 2007 (which saw its moniker changed to "95.5 The Hawk", and a new 50/50 classic and current country balance taking place) coincided with a change in ownership from CBS Radio to Wilks Broadcasting. Accordingly, the station completely revamped its website and as of May 2007, the new WHOK.com was rolled out, offering artist and concert links as well as a streaming audio feature by which users can "listen live" anytime.

Beginning in January 2009, WHOK-FM incorporated more of the classic country back into its playlist, dating back to the 1950s with songs by Hank Williams, Sr., some early Johnny Cash and George Jones numbers, and rare gems by Tammy Wynette and Billy "Crash" Craddock, to name a few. However, the station did not present this to listeners as a change in format; the branding of the station was still "95.5 The Hawk" and the website still displayed the same look and feel as before, albeit with more classic country artists. The playlist extended into the 1990s and early 2000s (e.g. Garth Brooks, Alan Jackson, Faith Hill) but no current or recent titles were played outside of certain syndicated shows.

On January 16, 2012, the station reverted to the K95.5 branding, and readopted a mix of newer and classic country with the positioner "New Country and the Legends". The classic component continued to differentiate WHOK-FM from its sister WNKK (Wink 107.1), which exclusively played new country.

=== Sports (2013–2015) ===
On Monday, April 1, 2013, at 6 p.m., the station changed to "95.5 The Game", broadcasting a sports format as an affiliate of CBS Sports Radio. K95 and its format moved to the former home of WINK 107.1 as "K95 on 107.1" and blowing up WINK 107.1 and staying with the former K95 branding, only switching frequencies from 95.5 to 107.1. The final song played on K95 on the 95.5 signal as a country format was "Wide Open Spaces" by The Dixie Chicks. On April 4, 2013, the station changed its call sign to WZOH-FM.

During its stint as a sports format, WZOH-FM was the Columbus affiliate for the Cleveland Browns and Cleveland Cavaliers. It was also the English flagship for Columbus Crew SC for the 2014 season.

=== Urban (2015–present) ===
The sports format lasted until midnight on November 12, 2015. At that time, WXMG's format moved from 106.3 FM to 95.5 FM. The 95.5 frequency, along with WHOK-FM, had been purchased by Radio One.

== Translator ==
Due to the poor signal in downtown Columbus, WZOH-FM operated a translator on 94.1 MHz as W272AT until June 25, 2013.
