= WNKO =

Coordinates: 40.144°N 82.639°W

- New Albany, Ohio; United States
- Broadcast area: Newark, Ohio Columbus, Ohio
- Frequency: 101.7 MHz (HD Radio)
- Branding: Kool 101.7

Programming
- Format: Classic hits
- Subchannels: HD2: WHTH simulcast (Country)

Ownership
- Owner: Runnymede Corporation

History
- First air date: 1972

Technical information
- Licensing authority: FCC
- Facility ID: 57936
- Class: B1
- ERP: 22,000 watts
- HAAT: 107 meters

Links
- Public license information: Public file; LMS
- Webcast: Listen Live
- Website: wnko.com

WNKO (101.7 FM) is a radio station licensed to New Albany, Ohio with a classic hits format.

The station is locally owned and operated by the Runnymede Corporation. WNKO began operating in 1972 and is the sister station to WHTH.

The station had previously covered only the Newark, Ohio vicinity with 3,000 watts of power. In 2009, WNKO filed an application to change its city of license to New Albany, Ohio, change its transmitter location, and upgrade power. The move was tentative on WKSW (now WCLI-FM), formerly in Urbana, Ohio, completing a move into the Dayton market and switching frequencies from 101.7 to 101.5. Until such completion was made, WNKO could not otherwise move because its signal was limited with WKSW.

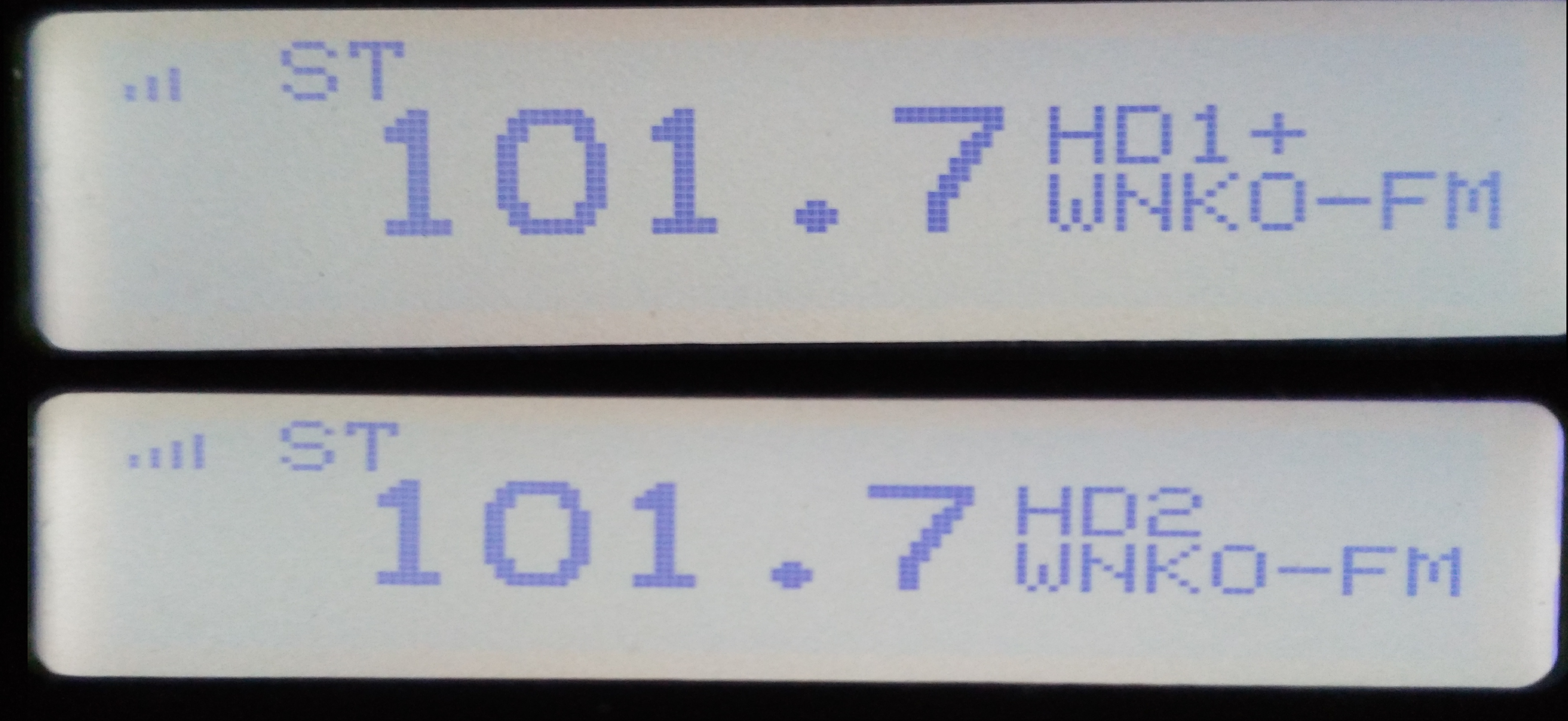
WNKO's HD Radio Channels on a SPARC Radio with PSD.

On March 25, 2011, WNKO began broadcasting from its new transmitter in Johnstown, Ohio. With this change, the station began providing a serviceable signal to the Columbus metropolitan area.

WNKO broadcasts in the HD format, and is also licensed to broadcast a digital hybrid signal.
