= Agri Broadcast Network =

Radio news network in Ohio

The Agri Broadcasting Network
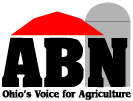
- Type: Radio network
- Country: United States
- Availability: State of Ohio, Surrounding Region
- Founded: 1972 by Ed Johnson in Columbus, Ohio
- Owner: Agri Communicators Inc. (1972-2001); Clear Channel Communications (2001-2007); AdVance Broadcast and Communication Ltd. (2007-2010)
- Replaced by: Ohio Ag Net

The Ohio Ag Net is a radio news network in the U.S. state of Ohio. Ohio Ag Net programming is heard on more than 70 radio stations statewide, including the major markets of Canton, Toledo, and Columbus. It is the direct successor to the original Agri Broadcasting Network (ABN.)

== History ==
The Agri Broadcasting Network (ABN) was founded in 1972 by the late Ed Johnson, President of Agri Communicators Inc., which included the Agri Broadcasting Network (ABN Radio), Ohio's Country Journal, a monthly farm newspaper, and the television program AgriCountry. Johnson, a well-known farm broadcaster formerly of WRFD in Columbus, Ohio, launched the network with a small number of radio stations, and delivered programming over the telephone from his farm in Ostrander, Ohio. His unmistakable enthusiasm, passion for agriculture, and unique broadcast style won a faithful following, and the network grew. The network, by the late 1970s finally leased a land line loop to affiliates which also fed programming from the Ohio News Network and Sports Ohio Network (later ONN Sports). By the mid-1980s, the ABN became a satellite operation.

Adding the television program to his efforts in 1982, Johnson's fame grew from that of a well-respected agricultural journalist to a household name in Ohio. In 1992, he launched the magazine Ohio's Country Journal. The size and scope of the ABN Radio network also grew, expanding to a footprint exceeding 72 radio stations in Ohio, Indiana, and West Virginia.

Following Johnson's death in 2001, the Johnson family sold the ABN to Clear Channel Communications, who moved network operations from Columbus and merged the network and programming into its Lima, Ohio cluster. In early 2007, Advance Broadcast & Communication Ltd, parent company of the Buckeye Ag Radio Network (aka: "the BARN") acquired the ABN, reintroduced Johnson's well-known preference for broadcasting "from the farm," and in early 2009, returned broadcast operations to Columbus.

In December 2010, Advance Broadcast and Communications ceased operations as mentioned on its website (now defunct and now redirects to AndyVance.com).

Lindsay Hill, associate farm director and co-founder of Buckeye Ag Radio Network "The Barn" (and wife of Vance) died in a two vehicle accident at the intersection of Ohio State Routes 235 and 41, just north of New Carlisle and west of North Hampton near Springfield, Ohio on Thursday morning May 19, 2011, while she was a new employee for AgDay, a television program produced by Farm Journal Magazine. Hill began her career as an ABN intern under Johnson's mentoring. Husband Andy Vance began his career at WRFD where Johnson started his.

Following the sale of ABN to Clear Channel, the Johnson family maintained the Country Journal, but Johnson's weekend television program, AgriCountry, which aired on 11 television stations across Ohio, was cancelled. The program aired over 1,000 episodes over its twenty-year run. The Johnson family business, Agri Communicators Inc., continues to publish Ohio's Country Journal, in addition to Ohio Ag Net, a new radio network founded in 2007 under the ownership of Johnson's son Bart and his wife Sheryl Johnson. ABN veteran anchor (and successor to "'ol E.J.") Dale Minyo anchors most of its programming.

Since 2011, Ohio Ag Net now uses the classic seven-note ABN synthesizer logo, played in the style of a banjo.

== "From the Farm, Good Morning!" ==
Launching his morning radio show from his farm in Ostrander (Delaware County), Johnson infused his reports with stories of his life on the farm. He always opened his broadcast with the trademark phrase "From the Farm, Good Morning!", followed by the crow of his legendary rooster sidekick, Abner. Prone to talking about his Belgian draft horses, Johnson enjoyed a relationship with his listeners that transcended his news and market commentary.

Another staple of the Johnson years was the use of ABN "Stinger." This brief synthesizer logo (resembling a banjo riff) was used as a sounder at the beginning of each ABN broadcast. Clear Channel discontinued the use of the stinger after acquiring ABN. A similar-styled version of the sounder using an actual group of musicians playing a banjo and other instruments was used by Clear Channel to play the familiar brief melody.

== Johnson's passing ==
Johnson survived a heart attack in November 1992. Dedicated to his work, he was back at the microphone shortly after his surgery. He suffered a massive heart attack in February 2001 and passed on at the age of 63. His death caused a series of key transitions, including the sale of ABN to Clear Channel, and the subsequent purchase of the network by Advance.

Maintaining the tradition and heritage of the Johnson years, the company dedicated the "Ed Johnson Memorial Studio" at the network's Columbus newsroom in July 2009. Johnson was honored posthumously for his work by the National Association of Farm Broadcasting in 2005 with enshrinement in the NAFB Hall of Fame.

== 2400 Olentangy River Road ==
For the majority of the Johnson era, ABN's studios were located at 1515 West Lane Avenue, just west of the Ohio State campus. The proximity to the University and Johnson's faithful passion for his alma mater led the network to create a well-known internship program. Numerous students worked in the ABN studios, including its owners Vance and Hill. Following their acquisition of the network from Clear Channel in 2007, the couple began the process of moving ABN from Lima back to Central Ohio.

On September 16, 2008, in partnership with WOSU Public Media, ABN announced the network would move its studios and network operations to the Fawcett Center for Tomorrow on the Campus of the Ohio State University. Flanked by WOSU General Manager Tom Reiland and OSU President Gordon Gee, Vance & Hill explained their desire to reconnect ABN to its roots in Columbus and reaffirm the traditional connection to the University. Renovating the original WOSU radio studios throughout the Fall and Winter of 2008, the network signed on from Columbus in January 2009.

As part of the university partnership, ABN employed a number of student interns in programming, operations, and marketing. In Fall 2009, ABN opened a learning laboratory in its studios to students in the Agricultural Communications program within the College of Food, Agricultural, and Environmental Sciences.

As of the beginning of 2011, Ohio Ag Net became the sole farm radio network serving Ohio continuing the tradition started by ABN founder Ed Johnson in 1972. In January of that same year, the familiar ABN synthesizer sounder began aired at the beginning of all programs aired on Ohio Ag Net after the demise of ABN (under the ownership of AdVance.) In June 2011, the Brownfield Ag Radio Network began operation in Ohio with a lineup of 12 radio affiliates making Ohio the tenth state in the mid-west covered by the network.

== Ohio Farm Bureau ==
At the beginning of 2021, the Johnson Family announced the purchase of the Ohio

== Sources ==
- Reese Medal and Gerlach Awards Presented at Ohio State
- ABN History
- National Association of Farm Broadcasting Hall of Fame
- Columbus Business First
- Death of Lindsay Hill
- Lindsay Hill tribute by husband Andy Vance
- Ohio Brownfield Charter Network Introduced
