= WCLT-FM =

Radio station in Newark–Columbus, Ohio

- Newark, Ohio; United States
- Broadcast area: Columbus metropolitan area
- Frequency: 100.3 MHz (HD Radio)
- Branding: T-100

Programming
- Format: Country
- Subchannels: HD2: Mainstream rock
- Affiliations: Compass Media Networks; Motor Racing Network

Ownership
- Owner: WCLT Radio
- Sister stations: WCLT

History
- First air date: August 7, 1947

Technical information
- Licensing authority: FCC
- Facility ID: 71285
- Class: B
- ERP: 50,000 watts
- HAAT: 119 meters (390 ft)
- Transmitter coordinates: 40°2′2.00″N 82°24′8.00″W
- Translator: HD2: 104.7 W284CH (Newark)

Links
- Public license information: Public file; LMS
- Webcast: Listen live Listen live (HD2)
- Website: wclt.com thebiglick.com (HD2)

WCLT-FM (100.3 FM) is a commercial radio station licensed to Newark, Ohio, United States, serving the Columbus metropolitan area. . It is owned by WCLT Radio and carries a country music format branded as "T-100". The transmitter and studios are on Jacksonville Road (Ohio State Route 13) in Newark.

WCLT-FM broadcasts using HD Radio technology. The HD2 digital subchannel carries a mainstream rock format known as "104.7 The Big Lick", relayed over FM translator W284CH at 104.7 MHz.

== History ==
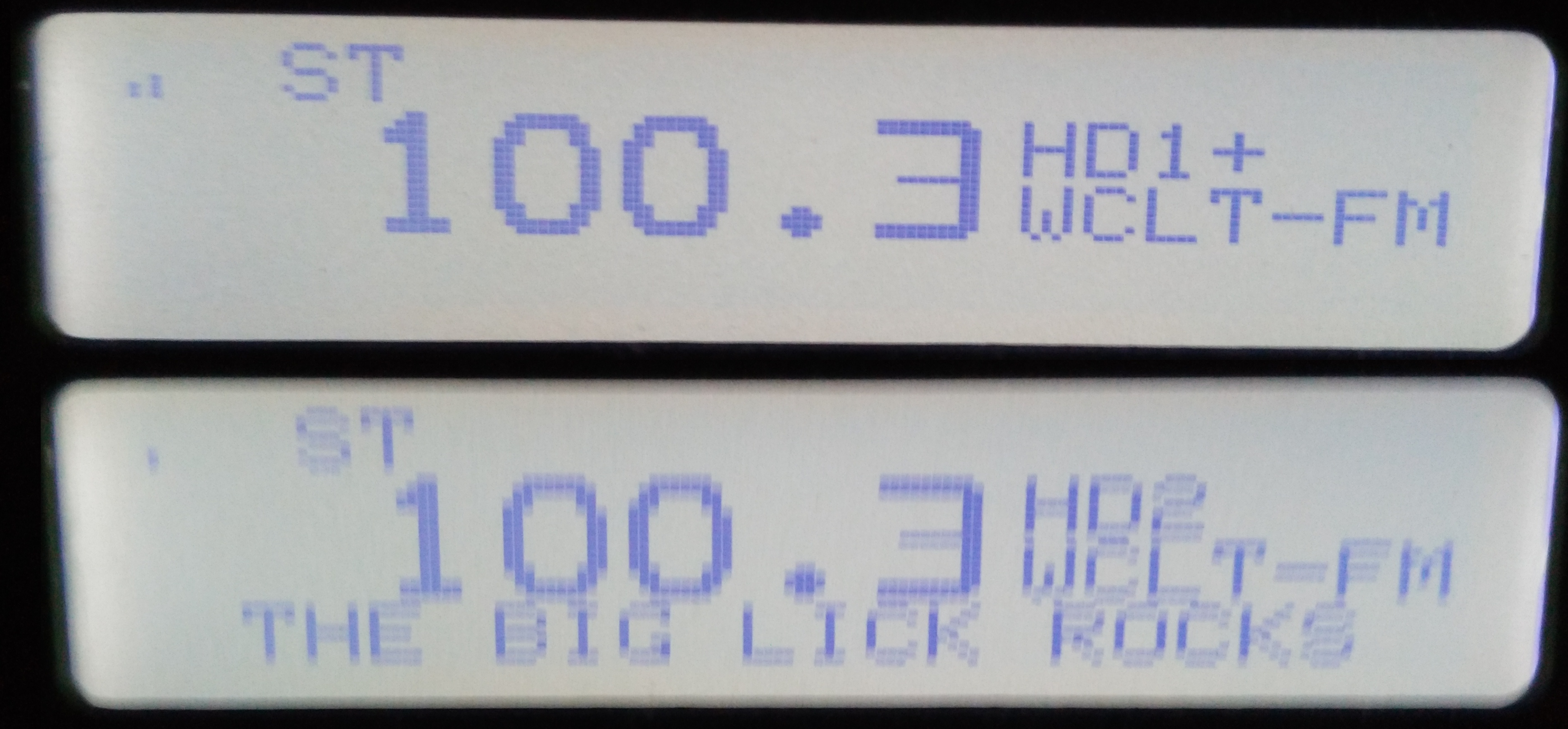
WCLT's HD Radio Channels on a SPARC Radio with PSD.

WCLT-FM signed on the air on August 7, 1947. It was owned by The Advocate, Newark's daily newspaper. In its early days, WCLT-FM largely simulcast co-owned WCLT (1480 AM).

By the 1970s, the FM station was offering separate programming. While WCLT (AM) was a Top 40 station, WCLT-FM played automated easy listening music. In the 1980s, the station made the transition to soft adult contemporary music. In the 1990s, it flipped to country music.
