= WJYD =

Radio station in London–Columbus, Ohio

London, Ohio; United States
- Broadcast area: Columbus metropolitan area
- Frequency: 106.3 MHz (HD Radio)
- Branding: Joy 106.3

Programming
- Format: Urban gospel

Ownership
- Owner: Urban One; (Blue Chip Broadcasting Licenses, Ltd)
- Sister stations: WCKX, WWLG, WXMG

History
- First air date: January 24, 1992
- Former call signs: WCKX (1992–1997); WMXG (1997–1998); WCZZ (1998–2000); WJYD (2000–2011); WXMG (2011–2015); WBMO (2015–2022); WHTD (2022–2024)
- Call sign meaning: Joy

Technical information
- Licensing authority: FCC
- Facility ID: 63949
- Class: A
- ERP: 6,000 watts
- HAAT: 100 meters (330 ft)
- Transmitter coordinates: 39°53′5.00″N 83°25′23.00″W

Links
- Public license information: Public file; LMS
- Webcast: Listen live
- Website: www.joycolumbus.com

WJYD (106.3 FM) is a commercial radio station licensed to London, Ohio, United States, and featuring an urban gospel format known on air as "Joy 106.3". Owned by Urban One, the station serves the Columbus metropolitan area.

The studios and offices are on East First Avenue, just north of downtown. The transmitter is off London-Lockbourne Road in London.

== History ==
The station was first licensed on May 26, 1993, as WCKX. When WCKX moved from 106.3 in London to 107.5 in Columbus on December 26, 1997, the call letters were changed to WMXG. The station became WCZZ on October 2, 1998. When 106.3 was known as WCKX, it was the Columbus area's only R&B and Hip Hop station, yet suffered from poor ratings because of its tower location in London, since the primary signal coverage reached only the western fringes of Franklin County and put secondary coverage into the remainder of the Columbus metropolitan area. The former WJZA at 107.5 became huge competition for "Power 106.3" in the late 90s and was eventually bought by Radio One and transferred to the 107.5 signal. In July 2000, the station flipped to urban gospel, branded as "Joy 106.3," with the WJYD calls adopted on July 31 of that year. On September 16, 2011, the station became the new home of WXMG's Urban AC format, and rebranded as "Magic 106.3." On September 23, WJYD changed its call letters to WXMG.

On November 13, 2015, WXMG began simulcasting on WZOH-FM after Radio One purchased it and WHOK-FM from Wilks Broadcasting, as Radio One announced they would be moving the "Magic" format to the new frequency. After simulcasting for three days, WXMG flipped to classic hip hop, branded as "Boom 106.3", on November 16 at noon. The station changed its call sign to WBMO on November 23, 2015.

On November 28, 2017, at 10 a.m., WBMO dropped classic hip hop for a simulcast with WCKX.

The station adopted new call letters WHTD on February 1, 2022.

On November 1, 2024, WHTD dropped the simulcast with WCKX and changed back to urban gospel under the revived "Joy 106.3" moniker; the "Joy" programming moved from WJYD (107.1 FM).
