= WJTA =

Catholic radio station in Glandorf, Ohio

Coordinates: 41.093°N 84.025°W

- Glandorf, Ohio (Transmitter near Leipsic); United States
- Broadcast area: Putnam, Hancock and surrounding counties plus northern portion of Lima area.
- Frequency: 88.9 MHz
- Branding: Holy Family Radio

Programming
- Format: Christian radio (Catholic)
- Affiliations: EWTN

Ownership
- Owner: Holy Family Communications
- Sister stations: WOHA (for: One Holy, Apostolic)

History
- First air date: July 26, 2010
- Call sign meaning: With Jesus, The Answer

Technical information
- Licensing authority: FCC
- Class: A
- ERP: 2,000 watts
- HAAT: 55.3 metres (181 ft)

Links
- Public license information: Public file; LMS
- Webcast: Listen Live from website
- Website: Holy Family Radio.FM; WJTA Facebook page

WJTA "Holy Family Radio" (for: "Jesus, The Answer") is a non-commercial FM broadcasting station with its studio and office located in Glandorf, Ohio with transmitter located near Leipsic in rural Putnam County. WJTA airs programming from the EWTN Global Catholic Radio Network, and transmits at 88.9 mHz on the FM band. It is the first full-time Catholic radio station to come on the air in northwestern Ohio and within the Toledo Diocese...the others being WNOC "Annunciation Radio" licensed in Bowling Green and based in Toledo (with Sandusky sister station WHRQ) and WRRO licensed in Edon serving the Bryan area and the corner of the Ohio, Indiana and Michigan state lines.

Aside from WHJM "Radio Maria" licensed in Anna, Ohio, serving the northern portion of the Cincinnati Archdiocese and the southern portion of the Lima area in west central Ohio, WJTA also simulcasts its programming for the Limaland area on WOHA at 94.9 mHz in Ada in addition to live audiostreaming from its website...and its smartphone app.

== History ==
Founder Tom Deitering was inspired by listening to EWTN's shortwave station WEWN. He at first thought about purchasing a station of his own but the price was astronomical. After hearing of new frequency availabilities opening up between the non-commercial frequencies of 88.1 and 91.9 (after analog television transmissions were scheduled to end in February 2009) Deitering applied for a frequency in October 2007 and was granted the 88.9 frequency in September 2009. Afterwards Mr. and Mrs Deitering began a speaking tour of local Catholic parishes within the Toledo diocese asking for donations to help with starting up the new station. In June 2010 a tower was purchased and erected, and on-air testing began.

WJTA (while in its construction permit status) aired test transmissions for several hours daily to adjust its transmitter which began on June 9 through July, and is now airing Catholic programming 24/7 since its official sign-on which took place on July 26, 2010. Upon its official inaugural sign-on, WJTA began local Catholic programming in addition to national programming from EWTN Radio. Its signal also reaches into neighboring Findlay to the east and the northern portion of the Lima area to the south on a standard FM car radio. WJTA is also known to be received in the communities of Delphos, Bluffton, Beaverdam, Paulding, Defiance and Napoleon while its Findlay FM translator (booster station W204CU) was heard north of Bluffton in the Cory-Rawson area, neighboring Arlington, Mount Blanchard, Benton Ridge, North Baltimore and Vanlue.

Its simulcast sister 94.9 WOHA (with its stronger 3,000-watt signal) now serves the greater Limaland area including the community of Carey, the location of the Basilica and National Shrine of Our Lady of Consolation.

A kick-off dinner for WTJA took place on August 1, 2010, at the Ottawa Knights of Columbus Hall. Toledo Bishop Leonard Blair among other guests introduced local and area listeners to the new station. WJTA's first website commenced streaming in early 2011, and they upgraded their domain in 2017.

WJTA's coverage area also complements the signals of WVSG 820 AM in Columbus as "St. Gabriel Radio" in addition to WNOC 89.7 FM licensed to Bowling Green serving the Toledo area and WHRQ 88.1 in Sandusky serving the north-coast area as "Annunciation Radio" which also carry nearly all of the EWTN Radio schedule in their respective areas and frequencies and can be easily accessed by a car radio in northwestern and north central Ohio.

== New station for Lima area on the air ==
According to its official website, Holy Family Communications purchased station WONB 94.9 mHz in Ada on December 12 of 2019. The purchase of WONB was approved by the FCC on March 4, 2020. The station is a simulcast of WJTA for the greater Lima area.

A new callsign (WOHA) was also approved, and commenced simulcasting WJTA's programming on April 22, 2020. Ohio Northern University will continue to use the WONB callsign as an internet-based station and concentrates solely on webcasting.

== New studio and office location ==
On August 10, 2022, Holy Family Radio moved its upgraded studio and office from its WJTA transmitter site near Leipsic to its permanent location in the former Glandorf school building (now the St. John the Baptist Parish Center) at 103 North Main St. in its community of license of Glandorf, Ohio. The event was celebrated with a grand opening ceremony with Mary Ann Deitering cutting the ribbon followed by a fellowship dinner and open house for its listeners, underwriters, families and supporters.

Holy Family Radio's online audiostream can also be heard from its official website and via its mobile app for cellphones.

Plans are being made for additional full-power FM repeater stations (90.9 in Fostoria and 89.7 in Van Wert) pending FCC approval.

== WJTA staff ==
- Tom Deitering (1936–2012) –founder, owner and first president
- Mary Ann Deitering – co-owner, executive director, secretary, volunteer coordinator and business manager
- Leo Schroeder – board president
- Kim Schroeder -volunteer
- John Recker – vice president
- Connie Recker-receptionist
- Deacon Jeff Compton – general manager and program director
- Greg Case – engineer
- Jim Lammers – chief operator and technical consultant
- Father Bob DeSloover – Spiritual director
- Jim Linthicum – volunteer, voice-overs and audio production.
- Lincoln Bramlage – past board president

Tom Deitering died on Saturday, September 15, 2012, at St. Rita's Medical Center in Lima, Ohio, after several weeks of deteriorating health. A Mass of Christian Burial took place on Wednesday, September 19, 2012, at Holy Family Catholic Church located southwest of the WJTA transmitter site in the rural community of New Cleveland. He is interred in the church cemetery. His obituary can be found here.

== Local programming ==
Aside from being an affiliate of EWTN Global Catholic Radio, WJTA also started producing and airing programs of local origin beginning in 2013.

- The Catholic Playlist- Contemporary Catholic music with Jeff Compton. Fridays at 10 pm and again on Saturdays at 8 pm. The program is also aired as a podcast from its website.

...and on affiliates (partial listing) including:

- Annunciation Radio (originated by WNOC) in Toledo
- WSJG-LP "St. John Paul The Great Radio" in Tiffin
- WVSG "St. Gabriel Radio" in Columbus
- KDJW "St. Valentine Catholic Radio" in Amarillo, Texas

and

- WEUC "Eucharist Radio" in Morganfield, Kentucky.

In April 2014, WJTA's live studio was upgraded to newer equipment including a new audio console, telephone interface, microphones and a digital audio processor providing consistent clean modulated sound on the air and online along with EWTN programming now provided by a digital receiver replacing the satellite dish which was destroyed in a 2012 summer derecho storm. WJTA and simulcast sister WOHA also streams its audio by means of its own smartphone app.

In January 2017 WJTA began simulcasting for the Findlay area on FM translator W256CJ at 99.1 mHz. This translator was previously used as a booster station for WBIE in Delphos which aired programming from American Family Radio. In April 2018, the Findlay translator moved to 88.7 mHz with the callsign W204CU (formerly W257EF) with increased power to cover a wider area of Findlay and Hancock County.

W204CU was sold in June 2023 to a non-Catholic Christian broadcaster

== Call sign history ==
The WJTA calls were previously used at another religious station at 91.7 FM in Kosciusko, Mississippi, from 1990 to 2008 (as "Assurance 91"...now defunct).

== See also ==
- WNOC, WHRQ, WFOT and WSHB "Annunciation Radio" based in Toledo
- WRRO EWTN affiliate serving the Bryan area and the Ohio/Indiana/Michigan state line corner region. (programming fed from Annunciation Radio's base in Toledo)
- WVSG "St.Gabriel Radio" EWTN affiliate in Columbus (the former WOSU (AM)).
