= Glandorf =

Glandorf is the name of the following places:

- Glandorf, Germany
- Glandorf, Ohio
- Glandorf (Kärnten), Austria
