= St. John the Baptist Catholic Church (Glandorf, Ohio) =

Historic church in Ohio, United States

- St. John The Baptist Roman Catholic Church
- U.S. National Register of Historic Places
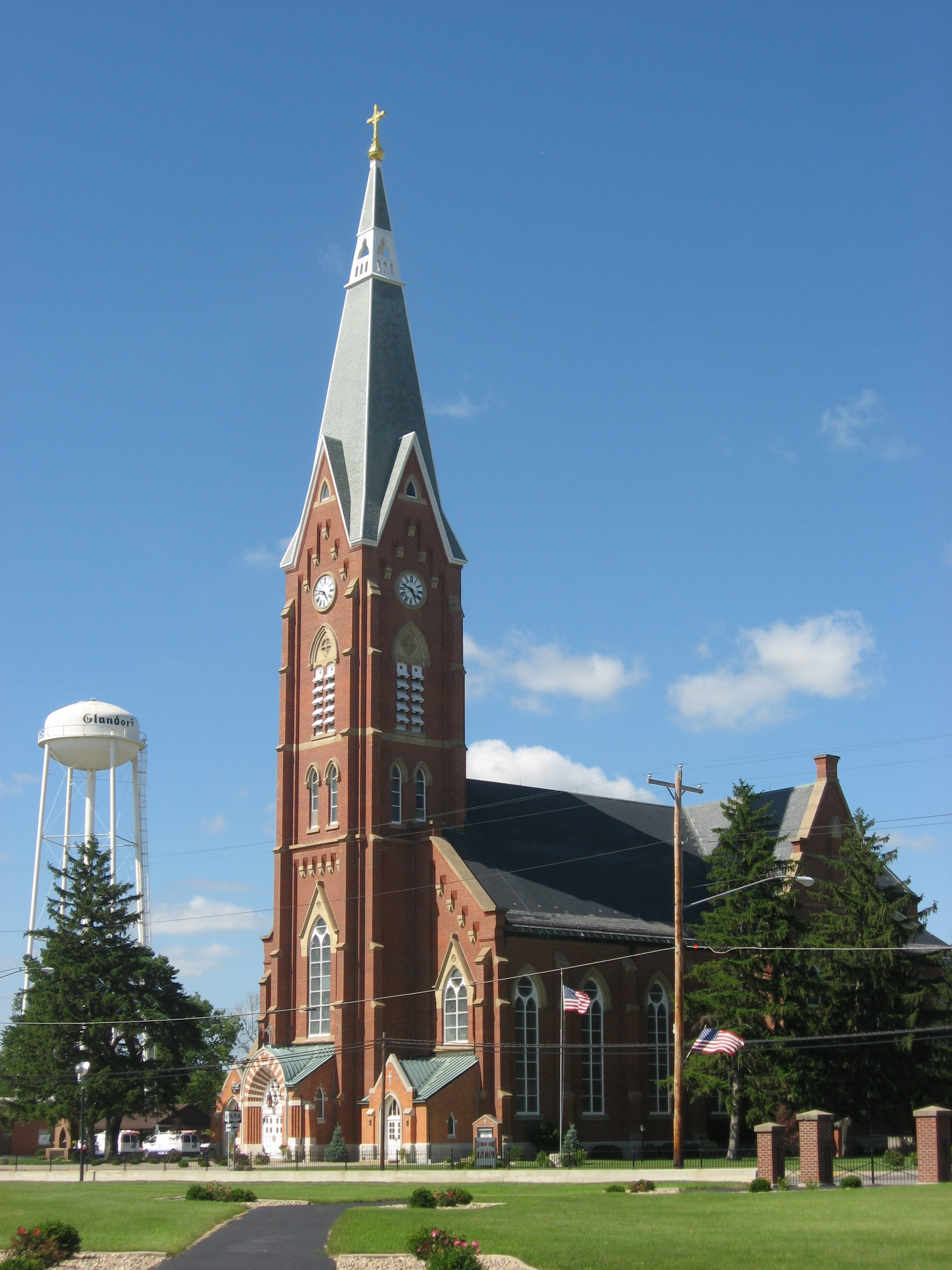

- Location within Ohio Location within the United States
- Location: OH 694 and Main St., Glandorf, Ohio
- Coordinates: 41°1′50″N 84°4′46″W
- Area: less than one acre
- Built: 1875
- Architect: Cudell & Richardson
- Architectural style: Gothic
- NRHP reference No.: 77001083
- Added to NRHP: June 17, 1977

St. John The Baptist Roman Catholic Church is a historic church at Ohio 694 and Main Street in Glandorf, Ohio. It was built in 1875 and added to the National Register in 1977.

== History ==
In 1834, Father Johann Wilhelm Horstmann and other settlers immigrated from Glandorf, Germany, to Putnam County, Ohio. They acquired a tract of land from the government, and established the town of Glandorf along with the first Catholic church in Putnam County. The church building was a 16 ft (4.9 m) by 18 ft (5.5 m) log cabin that also served as a residence for Father Horstmann.

The congregation quickly outgrew the original building and, in 1837, a larger hewn-log church was dedicated to St John the Baptist. Father Horstmann died in 1843 and Father Bohne, who took over the parish, began construction of a brick church building. Shortly afterward, the parish put under the control of the Sanguinist Fathers and, in 1848, a convent was established.

The current church building was built in 1875 and dedicated in 1878. It was designed by Cudell & Richardson, and it was the largest Roman Catholic church in Ohio at the time. The church is built in the Neo-Gothic style and has a 169-foot spire. It contained "figurines from Austria, stained glass windows imported from Munich, Germany, and a highly detailed pulpit which was purchased for $1,400 at the Centennial Exposition in Philadelphia", according to Michael Leach, who wrote a book on the church's history. Pioneer cemetery, which holds the grave of Father Horstmann, sits beside the church.

In 1977, the church was added to the National Register.

In 1992, a fire in the church caused $1.2 million worth of damage to the inside.

In 2015, the parish opened a museum to display the history of the church and the town of Glandorf.

== Church restoration ==
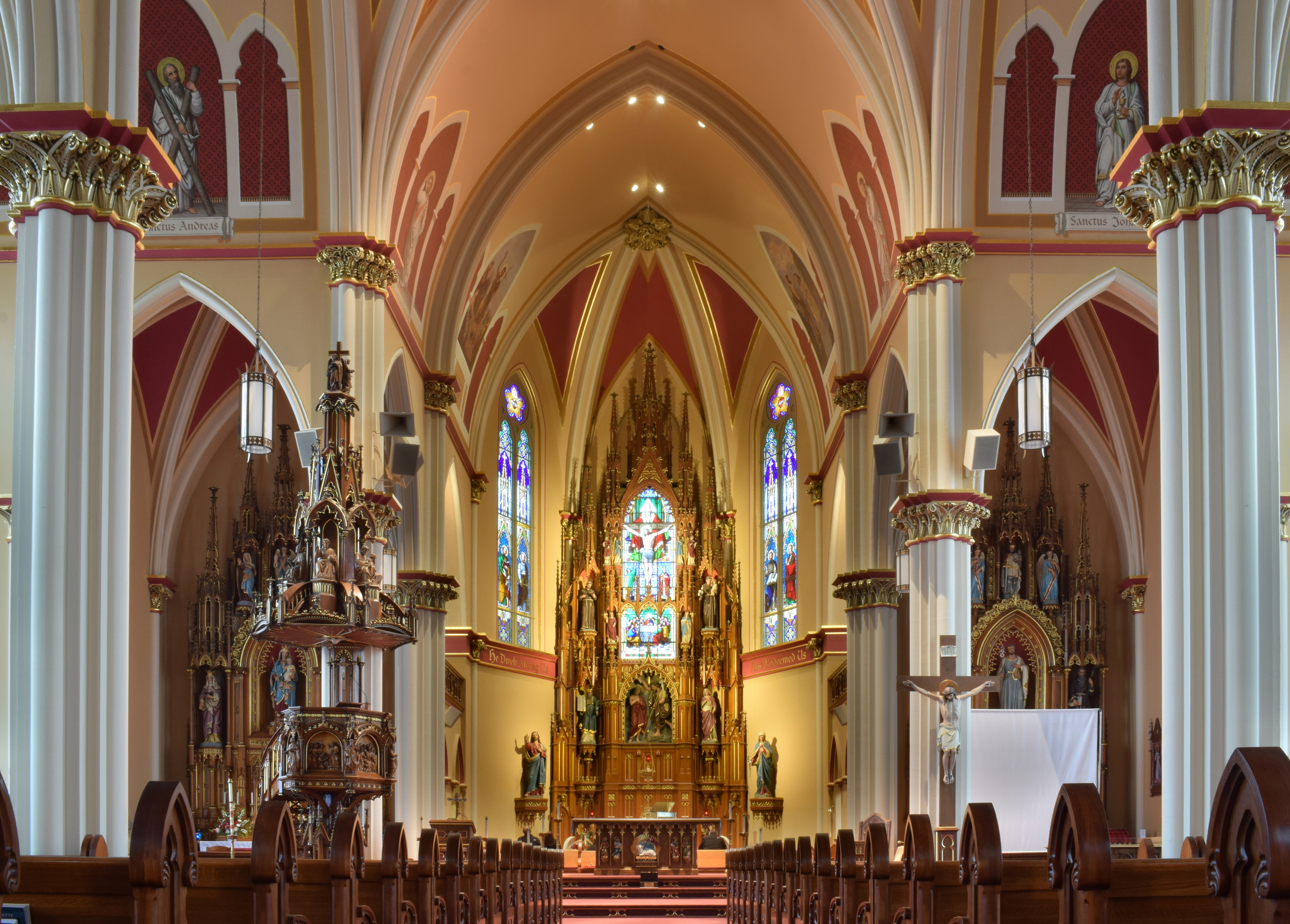
Interior

In 2017, the church underwent a 3-month restoration and improvement project. The $1.2 million project involved preventive measures such as fiberglassing the interior walls, painting, and installing updated storm windows to protect the stained glass. In addition, a lowered ceiling in the vestibule was removed to uncover a stained glass window. The work was carried out by Conrad Schmitt Studios of New Berlin, Wisconsin.
