= WSJG-LP =

Radio station in Tiffin, Ohio

Coordinates: 41°06′30″N 83°10′32″W

- Tiffin, Ohio; United States
- Broadcast area: Tiffin and portions of Seneca County, Ohio
- Frequency: 103.3 MHz
- Branding: St. John Paul The Great Radio

Programming
- Format: Christian radio (Catholic talk)
- Affiliations: EWTN Global Catholic Radio Network

Ownership
- Owner: San Raphael Radio Inc.

History
- First air date: January 27, 2015
- Call sign meaning: Saint John Paul The Great

Technical information
- Licensing authority: FCC
- Class: L1 (low-power FM
- ERP: 100 watts
- HAAT: 22.287 meters (73.12 ft)

Links
- Public license information: LMS
- Website: Official website

WSJG-LP ("St. John Paul The Great Radio") is a non-commercial low-power FM broadcasting station at 103.3 MHz in Tiffin, Ohio. It is the seventh Catholic station in the Toledo Diocese and is named in honor of Pope John Paul II who is now a canonized saint.

== History ==
The construction permit for WSJG-LP was granted by the FCC on February 12, 2014. Test transmissions began on January 1, 2015 and ended on January 27, 2015 when regular programming commenced.

WSJG airs Catholic programming from EWTN Global Catholic Radio for Tiffin and surrounding communities in Seneca County. Between signing on air and the completion of its local studio in May 2015, the station aired EWTN via an audio feed of Toledo-based Annunciation Radio (originated by WNOC). With the studio in operation, WSJG-LP also began producing local Catholic programming.

== Callsign history ==
The WSJG call letters were previously used briefly in 1991 at a gospel music-formatted station at 104.3 FM in Hamlet, North Carolina which is now WJSG.

== See also ==
- WNOC
- WJTA
- WLBJ-LP
