= WRRO =

- Edon, Ohio; United States
- Broadcast area: Northwest Ohio; Northeastern Indiana
- Frequency: 89.9 MHz
- Branding: Annunciation Radio

Programming
- Format: Christian (Catholic)
- Affiliations: EWTN; Ave Maria Radio

Ownership
- Owner: Our Lady of Guadalupe Radio, Inc.; (Annunciation Radio)
- Sister stations: WFOT; WHRQ; WNOC; WSHB

History
- First air date: June 19, 2012

Technical information
- Licensing authority: FCC
- Facility ID: 175485
- Class: A
- ERP: 1,400 watts
- HAAT: 93.9 meters (308 ft)
- Transmitter coordinates: 41°32′58″N 84°46′18″W

Links
- Public license information: Public file; LMS
- Webcast: Listen live
- Website: annunciationradio.com

WRRO (89.9 FM) is a non-commercial radio station which is licensed to Edon, Ohio, featuring a Catholic–based Christian format as a repeater station in the Annunciation Radio network. Owned by Our Lady of Guadalupe Radio, Inc. (d/b/a Annunciation Radio), the station serves Bryan, Ohio, and surrounding areas within the corner region of the Ohio, Indiana and Michigan state lines. WRRO was previously a sister station to WRDF, licensed in Columbia City, Indiana, and serving the Ft. Wayne market area.

WRRO made its on-air premiere on Tuesday June 19, 2012 originally as a repeater of WLYV, 1450 AM in Fort Wayne, Indiana until June 2014 when Redeemer Radio programming moved to WRDF (formerly WHPP).

WRRO is the fourth Catholic station to come on the air within the Roman Catholic Diocese of Toledo in Northwestern Ohio, the others being WJTA 88.9 FM licensed in Glandorf, based in Leipsic serving Ottawa, Findlay and portions of the Lima area and Annunciation Radio's owned stations WNOC licensed in Bowling Green serving Toledo and WHRQ in Sandusky.

WRRO was affiliated with Fort Wayne Catholic Radio Group, Inc. which now owns and operates WRDF "Redeemer Radio" at 106.3 FM licensed to Columbia City, Indiana and serving Ft. Wayne.

Previous owner Club 1915 Inc. is a venture of the Knights of Columbus Council 1915 of Bryan, Ohio. Club 1915 Inc. is also located in Bryan. and was the owner of WRRO which worked in partnership with Redeemer Radio until the spring of 2016 when it switched its affiliation to Toledo-based Annunciation Radio and its local station WNOC.

WRRO is now broadcasting as an affiliate of Annunciation Radio which will continue to air local programs in addition to much of the broadcast schedule of EWTN Global Catholic Radio and Ave Maria Radio Network. Programming is now fed directly from Annunciation's base in Toledo

WLYV was owned and operated by Fort Wayne Catholic Radio Group Inc. and was sold to Adams Radio Group in the spring of 2014. WLYV is now WIOE, and airs an oldies format. In this deal, Redeemer Radio purchased the former WHPP. Redeemer Radio programming moved to WHPP (now WRDF) on June 2, 2014.

WLYV simulcasted WHPP until July 4, 2014 when AM 1450 transitioned to "1450 The Patriot" as a talk format. Club 1915 Inc. sold WRRO to Our Lady of Guadalupe Radio, Inc. effective November 23, 2016 for $5,000.

== See also ==
- WRRO mention on Catholic Radio Guide
- WRRO startup date moved to Spring 2012 (from WRDF website)
- WRRO press release (March 1, 2012 from WRDF website)
- Article of WRRO's planned start-up from Fort Wayne Journal-Gazette website (October 3, 2011)
- WRRO-FM to carry Reedeemer Radio programs (from Reedeemer Radio Facebook entry on October 3, 2011)
- WRRO mention on Ohio K of C summer 2011 newsletter (in pdf format. scroll down to lower right hand corner of page 8.)
