= WOSX =

Radio station in Granville, Ohio

Semi-satellite of WOSU-FM, Columbus, OH, and WOSA, Grove City, OH
- Granville, Ohio; United States
- Broadcast area: Licking County; Columbus metro area (limited)
- Frequency: 91.1 MHz

Programming
- Format: Classical music; NPR News

Ownership
- Owner: Ohio State University
- Sister stations: WOSA, WOSU-FM, WOSU-TV

History
- First air date: November 12, 1953
- Former call signs: WDUB (1962–2020)

Technical information
- Licensing authority: FCC
- Facility ID: 16595
- Class: A
- ERP: 300 watts
- HAAT: 52 meters (171 ft)
- Transmitter coordinates: 40°4′16.2″N 82°31′23.5″W

Links
- Public license information: Public file; LMS
- Website: Official website

WOSX (91.1 FM) is a non-commercial, 300-watt college radio station registered by the Federal Communications Commission (FCC). It is currently owned and operated by Ohio State University and licensed to serve Granville, Ohio, United States.

== As WDUB ==
=== History ===
Originally WDUB and owned by Denison University, the station began as an AM "carrier current" radio station on November 12, 1953, at 7 a.m. with the Star Spangled Banner, but ceased broadcasting for a brief period of time in the 1960s, while the building that had housed its studios was being replaced. In 1969, the FCC authorized WDUB to return to the air with a 10-watt signal at 90.9 FM. During the 1970s, WDUB broadcast about 17 hours of programming per day, including open-format music, local sports, and extensive news and special events programming. Stereo broadcasting was introduced in 1975.

In the 1980s and 1990s, the station devoted its resources primarily to music, increased its power to 100 watts, increased its hours of operation, and changed its frequency to its current dial position. In the fall of 2004, WDUB began a second era of its history as the station began streaming its on-air content worldwide. During the summer of 2005, the station went through an entire digital upgrade of the main sound board, studio interconnects, catalog, recording, and record keeping functions.

Over 100 DJs volunteered to broadcast about one show per week. The open format allowed for each DJ to broadcast whatever type of music he or she preferred. The station aspired to feature 24-hour broadcasting, with shows going all night and day.

=== Popularity ===
WDUB was consistently ranked as one of America's most popular college radio stations by The Princeton Review (#20 in 2008) (#18 in 2011) (#18 in 2012) . The station was also featured in American Eagle stores nationwide from June to September in 2009. . Most recently, WDUB was ranked 17th in The Princeton Review's list of best college radio stations ahead of the release of their 2015 guide.

=== Events ===
The first annual "Doobiepalooza", a 91.1 WDUB sponsored event, occurred on May 3, 2014. The event showcased student musicians and artists. In fall 2014, WDUB debuted two new logos, a Swasey Chapel logo and a "boombox" logo, both created by students as part of a logo creation contest.

=== Alumni ===
Numerous Denison University graduates have used their WDUB experience as an entry into the field of commercial broadcasting. Notable former DJs include actor Steve Carell and former Cleveland Browns CEO Joe Banner.

== Transfer to Ohio State ==
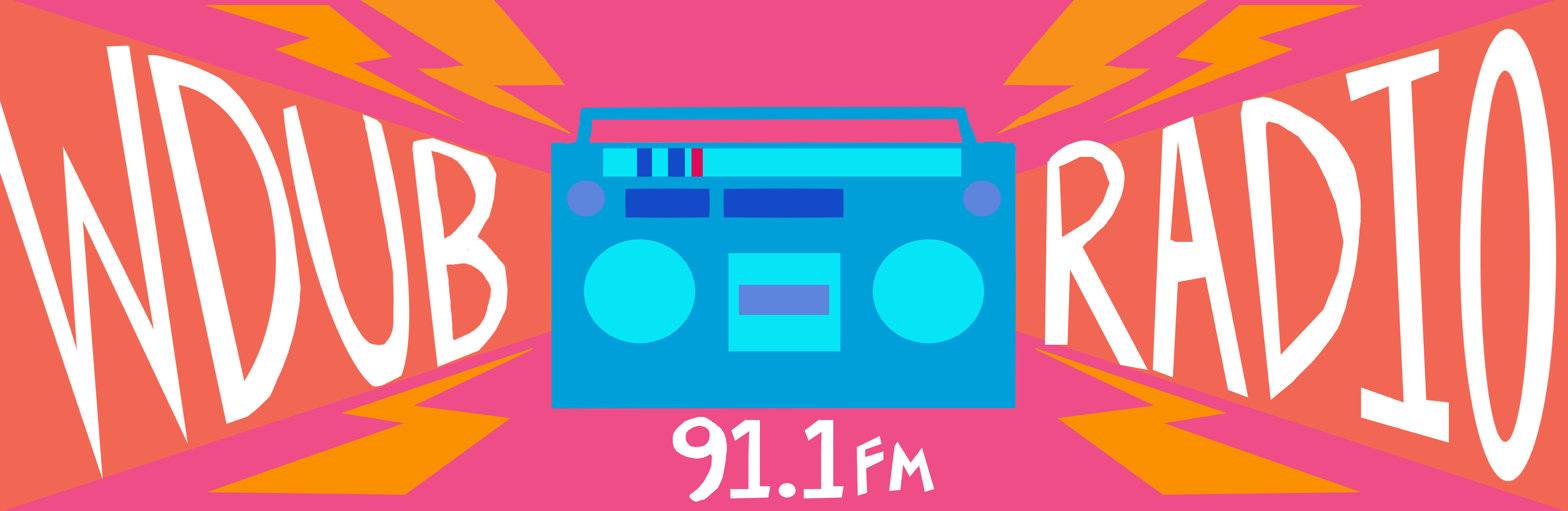
WDUB Banner Logo 2014-2020

On September 1, 2019, the station went silent after the students decided to move solely to an Internet radio format. The switch occurred due to changes made by the FCC, with which WDUB was having trouble complying.

On December 11, 2019, Denison University filed paperwork with the FCC to transfer the signal to Ohio State University for $5,000, on-air announcements for four years, and paid student internships. The sale was consummated on February 24, 2020, at which point the station changed its call sign to WOSX. As part of the sale, Denison University retained the WDUB call sign.

On March 2, 2020, WOSX relaunched as a hybrid of WOSU's existing public radio formats, simulcasting WOSU-FM in drive time periods with NPR's Morning Edition and All Things Considered while carrying WOSA's classical format at all other times; a four-station regional network operated by WOSU concurrently switched from relaying WOSA to relaying WOSX.

== Repeaters and translators ==
Broadcast translators for WOSX
Call sign	Frequency	City of license	FID	ERP (W)	HAAT	Class	Transmitter coordinates	FCC info
WOSB	91.1 FM	Marion, Ohio	66193	2,500 (horiz.); 6,800 (vert.)	83.88 m (275 ft)	B1	40°41′4.2″N 83°15′23.7″W	LMS
WOSE	91.1 FM	Coshocton, Ohio	66192	6,000	94.47 m (310 ft)	A	40°20′30.2″N 81°57′55.4″W	LMS
WOSP	91.5 FM	Portsmouth, Ohio	66187	110	358.13 m (1,175 ft)	A	38°45′42.2″N 83°3′40.6″W	LMS
WOSV	91.7 FM	Mansfield, Ohio	66184	750	135.08 m (443 ft)	A	40°42′33.2″N 82°29′10.6″W	LMS
