= WOSP =

WOSP may refer to:

- Great Orchestra of Christmas Charity (Wielka Orkiestra Świątecznej Pomocy), a charity in Poland
- WOSP (FM), a radio station licensed to Portsmouth, Ohio, US
