= WEAO =

WEAO may refer to:

- WEAO (TV), a television station (channel 24, virtual 49) licensed to Akron, Ohio, United States
- WVSG (AM), a radio station (820 AM) licensed to Columbus, Ohio, United States, which held the call sign WEAO from 1922 to 1933.
- Western European Armaments Organisation, a body of the Western European Union
- WhatExploitsAreOnline, a website used to obtain information on the latest Roblox exploits
