= WOHA (FM) =

Radio station in Ada–Lima, Ohio

- Ada, Ohio; United States
- Broadcast area: Lima
- Frequency: 94.9 MHz
- Branding: Holy Family Radio

Programming
- Format: Catholic radio
- Affiliations: EWTN

Ownership
- Owner: Holy Family Communications, Inc
- Sister stations: WJTA (originating station at 88.9mHz)

History
- First air date: October 18, 1991
- Former call signs: WONB (1991–2020)
- Call sign meaning: One Holy Apostolic

Technical information
- Licensing authority: FCC
- Facility ID: 50133
- Class: A
- ERP: 3,000 watts
- HAAT: 100.0 meters (328 feet)
- Transmitter coordinates: 40°45′58.00″N 83°50′14.00″W

Links
- Public license information: Public file; LMS
- Webcast: Listen Live from website
- Website: holyfamilyradio.fm

WOHA (94.9 FM) is a non-commercial educational FM radio station licensed to Ada, Ohio, operating at 94.9 MHz. The station is owned and operated by Holy Family Communications, Inc, and simulcasts Holy Family Radio, a Catholic radio station based at WJTA licensed in Glandorf and transmitting from Leipsic.

== History ==
In 1988, Ohio Northern University applied to the Federal Communications Commission to build a new radio station in Ada. WONB began broadcasting October 18, 1991. It was a student-run station, with studios in the Freed Center for the Performing Arts and a transmitter on campus. The station played a classic hits format during the daytime and more contemporary hits at night. WONB was associated with the school's communication and media studies department and its multimedia journalism major.

In December 2019, Ohio Northern announced it was selling the WONB license and facility to Holy Family Communications, which would use the station to rebroadcast its Catholic radio station WJTA, licensed to Glandorf. The facility sold for $175,000. Holy Family had been attempting to expand into the Lima area for nearly a decade; in 2016, the network had lost out on a translator that was then bought by a commercial broadcaster and relocated to Cincinnati. Ohio Northern has shifted its student radio to a live stream and podcasts; it also did not sell the WONB call letters in the transaction.

The sale was consummated on April 21, 2020, at which time the new owners changed the station's call sign to WOHA (for "One Holy Apostolic"). Holy Family began operation of the station on April 22, 2020. Its 3,000 watt signal clearly reaches the greater Limaland area and its adjacent communities along the I-75 corridor of West Central and Northwestern Ohio, as far north as the agricultural communities north of Findlay and as far south as Anna and Botkins south of Wapakoneta in addition to the faith community and its pilgrims of the Basilica and National Shrine of Our Lady of Consolation located in the village of Carey and neighboring Upper Sandusky.

Plans are being made for additional fulltime repeater stations at 90.9 in Fostoria and 89.7 in Van Wert pending FCC approval.

WOHA also audiostreams though the Holy Family Radio mobile app for cel phones.
