= WOSU-TV =

Television station in Columbus, Ohio

- Columbus, Ohio; United States
- Channels: Digital: 16 (UHF); Virtual: 34
- Branding: WOSU PBS

Programming
- Affiliations: 34.1: PBS; for others, see § Technical information and subchannels

Ownership
- Owner: Ohio State University
- Sister stations: WOSU-FM, WOSA

History
- First air date: February 20, 1956
- Former channel numbers: Analog: 34 (UHF, 1956–2009); Digital: 38 (UHF, 2004–2020)
- Former affiliations: NET (1956–1970)
- Call sign meaning: Ohio State University

Technical information
- Licensing authority: FCC
- Facility ID: 66185
- ERP: 675 kW
- HAAT: 332 m (1,089 ft)
- Transmitter coordinates: 40°9′33″N 82°55′22.7″W
- Translator(s): W18ES-D Mansfield

Links
- Public license information: Public file; LMS
- Website: wosu.org/television/

Former satellite station
- WPBO
- Portsmouth, Ohio
- Channels: Digital: 43 (UHF); Virtual: 42

History
- First air date: October 1, 1973
- Last air date: October 25, 2017; (44 years, 24 days)
- Former channel numbers: Analog: 42 (UHF, 1973–2009)

Technical information
- Facility ID: 66190
- ERP: 50 kW
- HAAT: 382 m (1,253 ft)
- Transmitter coordinates: 38°45′42″N 83°3′41″W

WOSU-TV (channel 34) is a PBS member television station in Columbus, Ohio, United States. Owned by Ohio State University as part of WOSU Public Media, it is sister to public radio stations WOSU-FM (89.7) and WOSA (101.1 FM). The three stations share studios on North Pearl Street near the OSU campus; WOSU-TV's transmitter is located on Highland Lakes Avenue in Westerville, Ohio.

WOSU-TV began broadcasting on February 20, 1956, though Ohio State University had pushed to start an educational television station as early as 1951. It initially engaged in the broadcast of programs for schools and college students as well as programming from National Educational Television—the forerunner to PBS. As the first UHF station in the market, many households could not receive channel 34 when it launched. A major step forward for the station was its 1968 telecast of a highly anticipated football game between Ohio State and Michigan, as many went out to buy all-channel television sets or converters. Channel 34 continued to telecast live football games on a viewer-supported basis through 1971, after which the NCAA prevented the station from continuing with the practice.

In the early 1970s, WOSU-TV moved from its original studios into the Fawcett Center for Tomorrow on the OSU campus, from its original tower to its present site in Westerville, and into Portsmouth with the launch of rebroadcaster WPBO (channel 42), which broadcast from 1973 to 2017. In the 1980s, Ohio State's public broadcasting operation was the subject of internal and external reviews that found deficiencies in management, ethics, and television programming; the university placed the WOSU stations under academic supervision, where they remained through the 1990s and were frequently subject to budget cuts.

WOSU was Central Ohio's first TV station to use a digital signal to broadcast multiple channels of programming. In 2006, it opened a second studio inside the COSI museum in downtown Columbus. This closed in 2021 when the university opened a new headquarters for the WOSU Public Media stations adjacent to the OSU campus. WOSU produces programs covering Central Ohio politics, arts and culture, and communities.

== History ==
=== Early years ===
The Ohio State University (OSU) had expressed interest in educational television as early as 1951. That year, it petitioned the Federal Communications Commission (FCC) to move very high frequency (VHF) channel 12 to Columbus so that it could use it as an educational channel. The FCC denied the proposal because it would have had to delete channels from three other cities, including Indianapolis and Huntington, West Virginia; this left OSU to use the previously assigned channel 34 in the new ultra high frequency (UHF) band. In spite of being forced to UHF, the university chose to press forward with its plans for educational TV, requiring it to start over with its preparation of engineering data for the application. The application was nearly ready by January 1953, the university having waited so that it did not buy equipment that immediately became obsolete with advancements in UHF technology. OSU had identified a location on its farm, on the west side of the Olentangy River, for a studio site. It was formally filed on February 18, 1953, and approved by the FCC on April 22.

While Keith Tyler, a WOSU leader, expected the university to move quickly on establishing the station, administration took a slower tack; this frustrated Tyler, who saw the university slipping behind Michigan State University and the University of Wisconsin in setting up educational television. OSU approved a contract for tower construction on the corner of Star Road and Lane Avenue in February 1954, and the television studio on the site broke ground that December. In September 1955, channel 34 broadcast its first test pattern, which soon expanded to include the occasional broadcast of programs. The station officially began broadcasting on February 20, 1956, becoming the 19th noncommercial educational TV station on air. Its first day on air included a film program showing scenes of the OSU campus and a performance by its symphonic choir.

By 1958, WOSU-TV operated for about 30 hours a week; nearly half of that output consisted of live programs from the studio or remote locations. A local children's show, Five and Ten, was among channel 34's early successes; another offering, the German Hour, was a carry-over from a popular WOSU radio program. Its educational offerings ranged from remedial college-level math to driver's education courses. The general audience was limited by the fact that most sets of the time did not come equipped to tune the UHF band; the university estimated only about 2,000 Columbus-area homes could watch. When it signed on for the first time, one potential viewer called to say it was impossible that WOSU-TV was broadcasting on channel 34 when their TV dial stopped at 13; station management treasured comments from viewers, since they proved that there were viewers beyond students in classrooms. In 1959, the station acquired the first video tape recorder in Columbus; its studios grew cramped, with the men's restroom doubling as an office and a small house being built nearby to alleviate the crowded conditions. Its educational programs supported not only the university but public schools and the Midwest Program on Airborne Television Instruction.

=== Football on 34 ===
From before channel 34 signed on, officials anticipated using it as a telecasting outlet for the popular Ohio State Buckeyes football team. In 1955, George E. Condon of the Cleveland Plain Dealer asked what might motivate households to notice channel 34 and convert their VHF-only sets to receive the area's first UHF station. He remarked, "Down deep, most people here feel Big Ten football will be the big answer." In the late 1950s, the station began taping football games with a tape recorder installed in a converted passenger bus, known by staff as "The Wire" and as an unreliable setup.

Shortly after it signed on in 1956, station management was hopeful that the NCAA would grant approval to televise home football games. Prior to the 1957 season, the NCAA revised restrictions on college football telecasts, at the behest of several state legislatures, to permit the telecast of home games on a noncommercial basis by "the home college's institutionally owned educational television station". Channel 34 finally got its chance in 1968, when the station received NCAA approval to telecast the sold-out Michigan–Ohio State game. The broadcast was the station's first local production in color, using a unit from New York. The broadcast, organized at the last minute and produced by ABC Sports, was announced by the station's program director and the general manager of WOSU; the Buckeyes won the game en route to a national championship. It stimulated the sale of all-channel sets and UHF converters as fans flocked to buy the necessary equipment to see the highly anticipated matchup. Channel 34 broadcast multiple sold-out OSU home football games in 1969, 1970, and 1971, conditional on public support to front the costs of renting equipment. Even though the team sold out all its home games in 1972, the NCAA no longer allowed WOSU-TV to air games live. Citing the station's increased distribution on cable systems well outside its broadcast coverage area, it declined to allow the station to air further telecasts and thus hurt attendance at colleges in areas as distant as Sandusky, Portsmouth, Xenia, and Zanesville. From 1978 to 1990, the station offered tape-delayed football broadcasts, which included the Ohio State Marching Band's pregame and halftime routines.

=== New tower, new studios, and Portsmouth expansion ===
In 1967, Nationwide Communications, the broadcasting division of Columbus-based Nationwide Mutual Insurance Company, obtained a construction permit to build a new UHF TV station in the city. It proposed a tower near Westerville, which was initially vociferously opposed by the university because it feared disruption to the operations of its radio astronomy observatory. Nationwide and the university reached an agreement to share the tower, which also faced opposition from residents and the Genoa Township zoning board. However, the zoning board's 2–1 vote against the tower was not unanimous, as was required to prevent the rezoning of the site. In 1971, WOSU-TV received federal funding to help acquire local color cameras and build the Westerville tower, (Note: While WNCI-TV never materialized, channel 28 eventually did under another owner as WTTE in 1984, using WOSU's Westerville site.) which was completed in January 1973.

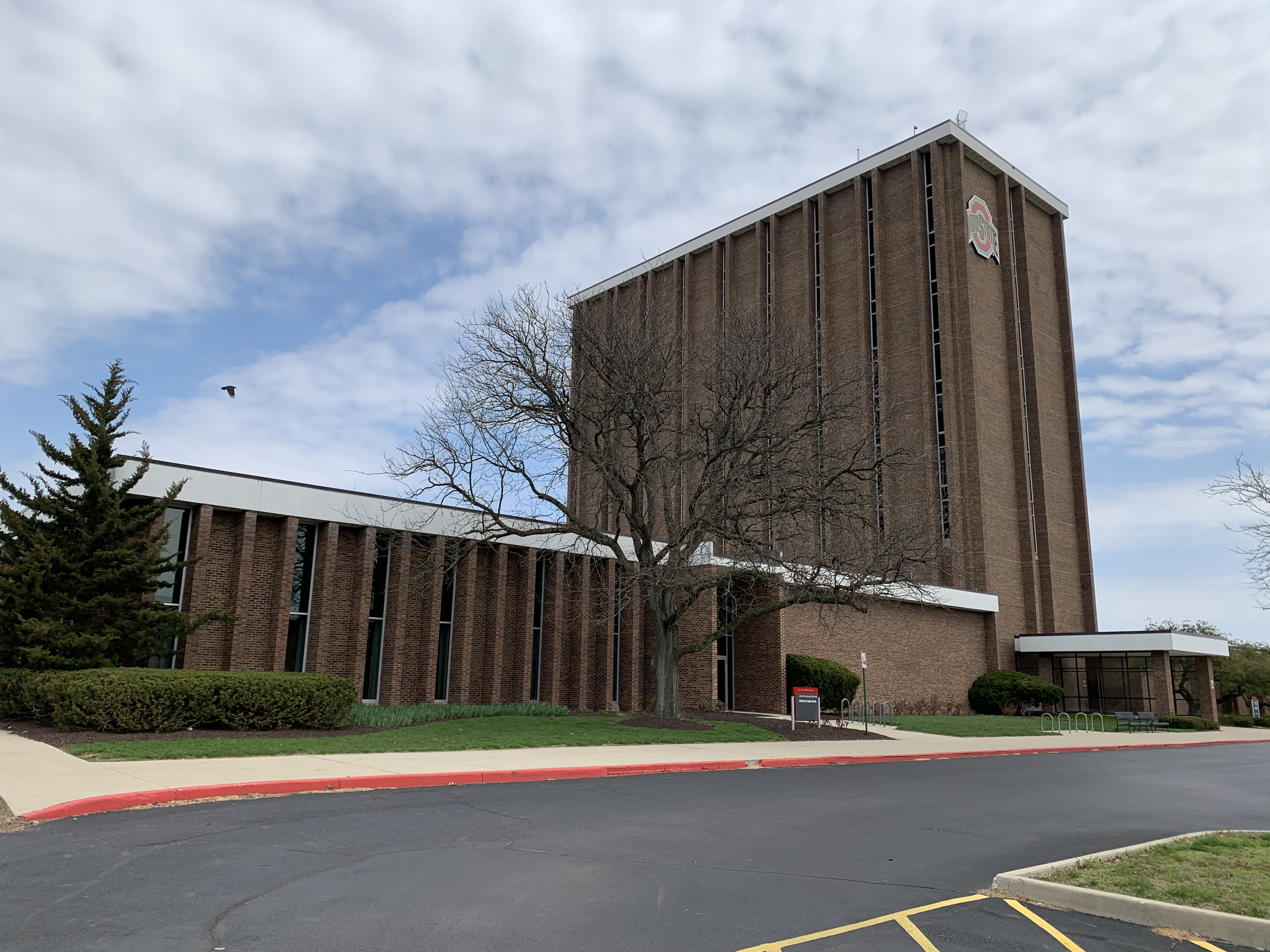
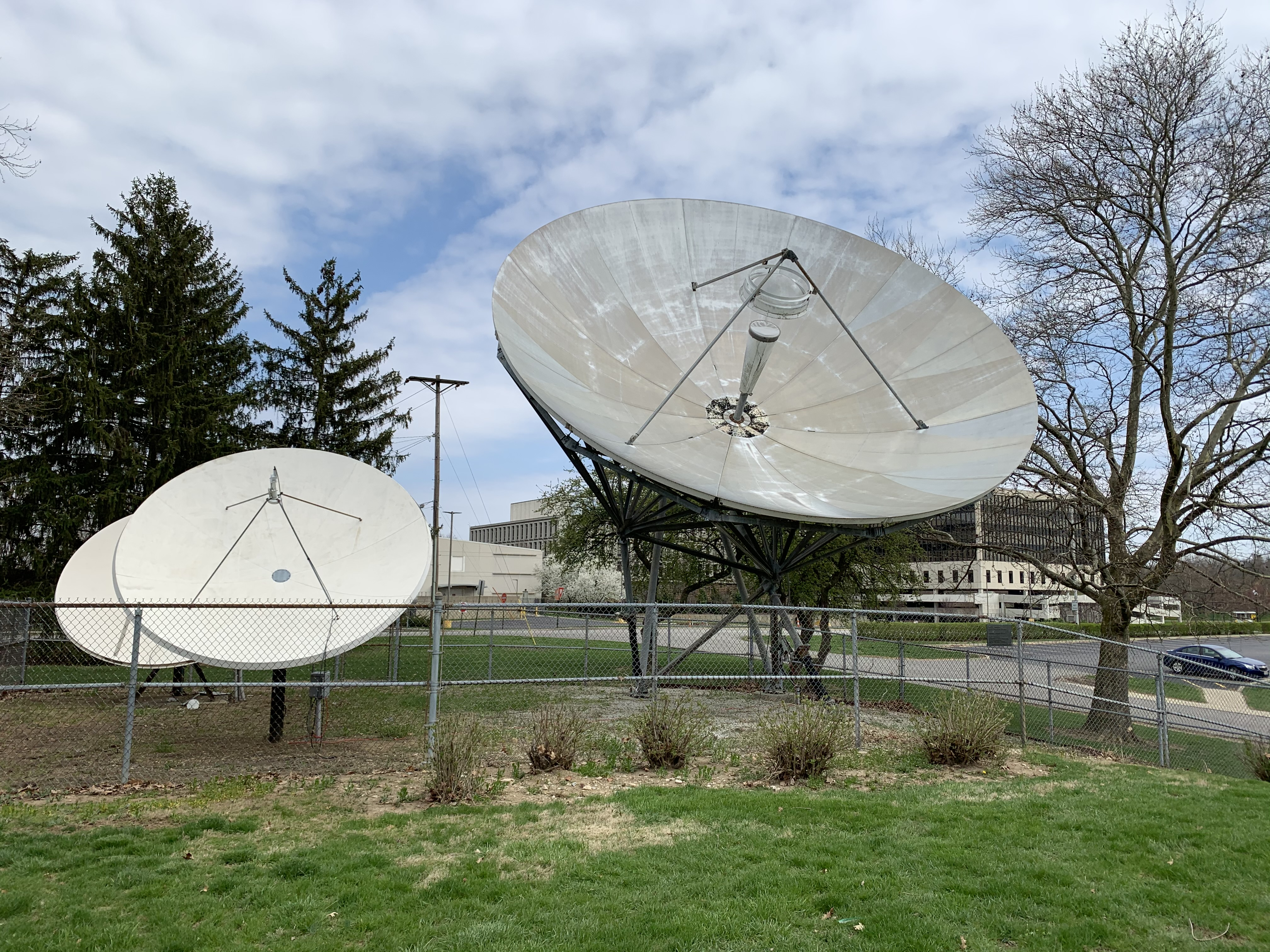
WOSU-TV broadcast from the Fawcett Center for Tomorrow from 1971 to 2021.

Beyond football and a new tower, the 1970s were a busy decade for the new station. In May 1970, Ohio State University shut down after the Kent State shootings in northeast Ohio; this included the temporary closure of the WOSU radio and television stations. At the time, WOSU television was still at the research farm, far enough from campus that it was joked that students could not find WOSU-TV if they tried. The WOSU stations moved to the newly built Center for Tomorrow in August 1971, uniting WOSU radio and television under one roof for the first time; the previous site became the home of the Ohio Educational Television Network Commission. The Fawcett Center facility had been intended for three television studios but was scaled back to two due to financial constraints. The Network Commission used the site as the hub of its statewide distribution system for educational television broadcasts over WOSU-TV and other stations. Friends of WOSU, a local fundraising group, was established in 1973 to provide additional financial support during a time when it appeared the Nixon administration would reduce public broadcasting funding; in 1978, it established an endowment whose value grew from an initial $100,000 to $5.4 million by 2018. Meanwhile, the station's role in providing televised instruction diminished during this time.

In addition to providing programming, the Network Commission built additional transmitters to extend educational television service to previously unserved portions of Ohio. One of these rebroadcast WOSU-TV: WPBO (channel 42) in Portsmouth, to the south of Columbus. WPBO began broadcasting on October 1, 1973, from a transmitter located on Peach Orchard Hill. The station was built by and originally licensed to the Network Commission; its license was transferred to OSU in 1978.

In the late 1970s, WOSU's unconventional programming philosophy helped it become one of the fastest-growing PBS stations in the country in total viewership with frequent runs of such shows as Doctor Who, All Creatures Great and Small, and The Twilight Zone. This came in spite of the station's chief local program of the time, Ohio Journal, being canceled after five years in 1980 due to insufficient state funding. The scheduling practice ended in 1981 when the station instead bought all of PBS's programs in a bundle to save money, requiring it to discontinue some of the series.

=== WOSU in the 1980s and 1990s ===
In 1983, the high school quiz show In the Know moved from WBNS-TV to WOSU-TV, becoming a long-running staple of channel 34. On its new outlet, it was hosted by Bill Schiffman, a professional accountant who had previously hosted WOSU-TV pledge drives; OSU began providing scholarships to students who made the quarterfinals. Following the pattern of other public TV stations across the nation, the station held its first televised auction in 1984; the auction routinely brought in between $150,000 and $300,000 for channel 34's operations and continued through 2008. The station began broadcasting stereo sound in 1986, making it the second local outlet to do so after WCMH-TV.

Until this time, the WOSU stations were supervised by Ohio State University president's office. Irregularities with the 1986 edition of the station's auction attracted negative attention, leading station representatives to admit they had placed bids on slow-moving auction items in hopes of getting them to sell. In response, president Edward H. Jennings ordered internal and external reviews of the station. The process was lengthy; portions of the internal review leaked to The Lantern—Ohio State's student newspaper—and the Cleveland Plain Dealer. First to be completed was the internal review. The external review, conducted by public broadcasters from other states, stated,

Although there are vague mentions of aspirations to excellence, the administration of the University does not seem to have a clear idea of why the institution is in the broadcasting business and what would constitute excellence for WOSU.

The reviews identified a myriad of issues in the operation of the WOSU stations. There were ethics lapses; the Ohio Department of Development paid for coverage of its activities, WOSU-TV aired a program on hog farming produced by the pork industry, and it aired a series paid for by a local health system. University administrative decisions came under fire, such as directives to air OSU football rebroadcasts and the 1987 memorial service for football coach Woody Hayes. The stations were seen as avoiding controversial community issues in their news coverage and discouraging journalists from doing so in order not to offend potential donors. Workplace conditions were characterized by pervasive "paralysis and paranoia", low salaries and staff morale, aging equipment, and a "mysterious" chain of command to the rest of the university. WOSU-TV came in for special criticism in the external review, which called its output "basic at best" and noted that channel 34's operation evinced the radio-first nature of WOSU.

When the review process culminated in 1990, a strategic plan was drafted for the WOSU stations, which were placed under the College of Social and Behavioral Sciences—the OSU academic unit that included programs in journalism and communication. The implementation of the strategic plan was adversely affected by Jennings's departure that same year, and the station became a neglected component of the college and the primary destination of its budget cuts during university-wide spending reductions in the early 1990s.

In 1992, in response to state-mandated cuts, Jennings's successor, Gordon Gee, mentioned the possibility of eliminating the WOSU stations. By that time, the public provided 40 percent of support for the stations and the university 20 percent; in the period from 1980 to 1996, OSU support remained flat as community funding increased. During this time, there was some discussion as to whether WOSU was best transferred from the university to a community licensee. This resulted in a study that found the value of WOSU's airtime to the university to exceed $2 million a year. At this time, under the urging of OSU dean Randall Ripley, the station produced more programming reflective of OSU, such as CsurisVision—a documentary on computer artist Chuck Csuri—and programs for the university's 125th anniversary. The College of Social and Behavioral Sciences continued to supervise the stations until 2001, when they were placed under the vice president of university relations.

=== Digitalization, new headquarters, and repack ===
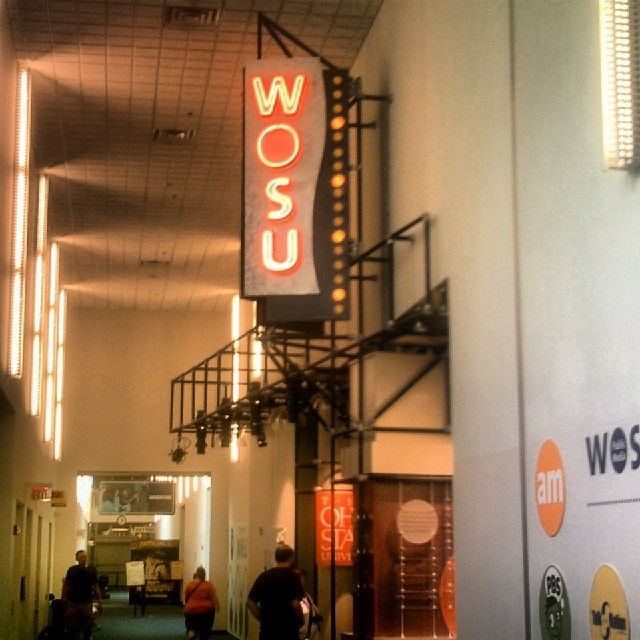
Entrance to WOSU@COSI

In 2006, WOSU opened a second studio and facility inside the COSI museum in Columbus, known as WOSU@COSI, complementing the Fawcett Center; a $1.6 million gift from the Battelle Memorial Institute, the largest in station history to that time, helped fund construction and an endowment. In addition to radio and television studios, the 12,000-square-foot (1,100 m^{2}) digital media center contained two interactive exhibits. The arrangement was also useful to COSI, which was facing declining attendance and seeking partners to share in its high utility costs in its new Broad Street building.

WOSU began broadcasting a digital signal in January 2004 and was the first TV station in Central Ohio to broadcast multiple programs on its digital transmitter. In addition to a simulcast of channel 34's main programming, WOSU-DT offered subchannels of PBS Kids programs, education and learning programs, and Ohio and public affairs programs during the day, which closed at night to allow a high-definition broadcast. In order to make the move to digital, the station launched a three-year capital campaign, the first in the history of WOSU broadcasting, to support the new studio and transmission equipment necessary for the conversion. WOSU and WPBO ceased analog broadcasting on March 31, 2009, to save on electrical costs for maintaining both analog and digital signals through the June 12 transition date.

Ohio State University announced on March 3, 2017, that it had sold the license for WPBO for $8.8 million in the FCC's spectrum auction. WOSU general manager Tom Rieland told The Columbus Dispatch that Portsmouth had "incredible duplication of PBS signals"; he cited high cable penetration and the availability of WOUB-TV in Athens as well as transmitters of Kentucky Educational Television and West Virginia Public Broadcasting. Parts of its coverage area also overlapped with WOSU-TV itself and WCET in Cincinnati. WPBO ceased operations October 25, 2017; its license was cancelled two days later. The spectrum auction was followed by a repack that saw WOSU move from channel 38 to channel 16 in 2020.

In 2015, the partnership with COSI began to end with the realization that WOSU had outgrown its space at the Fawcett Center and wanted to continue to engage the community through a public space. A new studio building was included in plans by Campus Partners, OSU's development arm, to construct a new development known as University Square at 15th Street and High Avenue adjacent to the campus, and the station launched a second capital campaign in 2018. The facility opened in 2021; it reunited the broadcasting stations' operations, which had been split between the COSI studio for television and Fawcett Center for administrative staff and radio, and offered 53,000 square feet (4,900 m^{2}) for WOSU radio and television. The facility was financed by a second capital campaign as well as $7.8 million of the $8.8 million OSU earned from selling WPBO-TV's spectrum.

== Funding ==
In fiscal year 2022, WOSU-TV had a total revenue of more than $11.8 million. The station was provided a Community Service Grant totaling $1.46 million by the Corporation for Public Broadcasting and $972,000 in appropriations by OSU, as well as $1.9 million in revenue from its endowment. It had 24,170 members, who donated a total of $3.71 million.

== Local programming ==
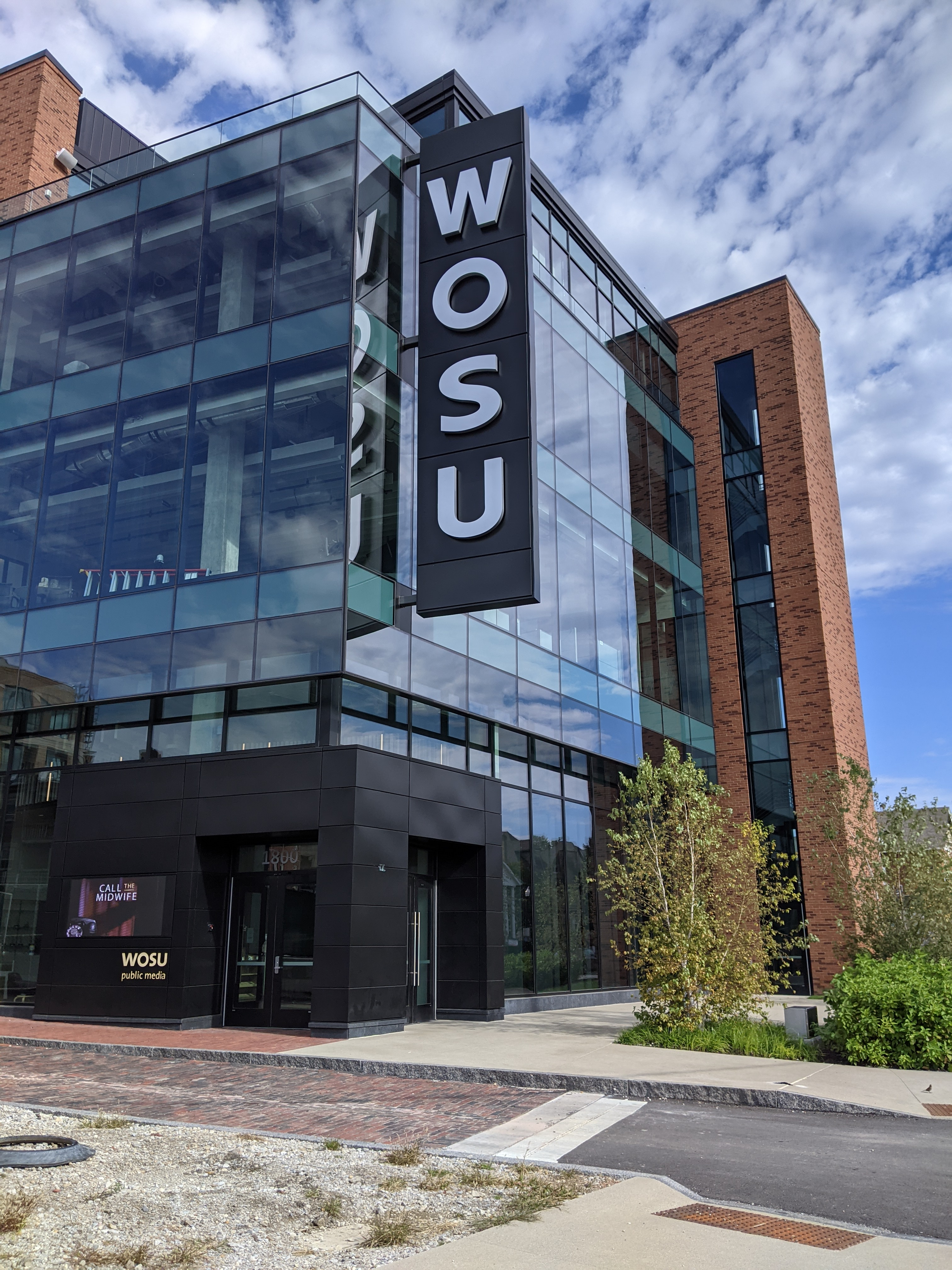
The WOSU Public Media building in the University Square development in Columbus

WOSU-TV's local programming primarily covers the Columbus area, including arts and culture magazine Broad & High and Columbus on the Record, a weekly political program. In 2010, the station debuted Columbus Neighborhoods, a series of historical documentaries focusing on one part of the city of Columbus. Originally designed for the city's bicentennial, the station turned the series into a running program in 2013.

== Technical information and subchannels ==
WOSU-TV's transmitter is located on Highland Lakes Avenue in Westerville, Ohio. The station's signal is multiplexed:

Subchannels of WOSU-TV
Subchannel	Res.	Short name	Programming
34.1	1080i	WOSU-D1	PBS
34.2	480i	WOSU-D2	WOSU Ohio (The Ohio Channel)
34.3	480i	WOSU-D3	WOSU Plus (Create)
34.4	480i	WOSU-D4	WOSU Kids (PBS Kids)
34.7	480i	WOSU-D7	VoiceCorps (radio reading service)

== See also ==
- WOSU (AM)
- WOSU-FM
- WOSA

== Bibliography ==
- Rieland, Thomas (2019). Sparks flew: WOSU's century on the air. Columbus, Ohio: Ohio State University Press. ISBN 978-0-8142-1396-4.
