= WOSU-FM =

Public radio station in Columbus, Ohio

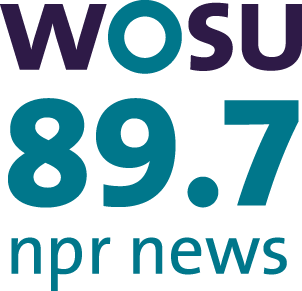
- Columbus, Ohio; United States
- Broadcast area: Columbus metro area
- Frequency: 89.7 MHz (HD Radio)
- Branding: 89.7fm NPR News

Programming
- Language: English
- Format: Public radio/talk
- Subchannels: HD2: Classical music (WOSA)

Ownership
- Owner: Ohio State University
- Sister stations: WOSU-TV, WOSA

History
- First air date: December 13, 1949
- Call sign meaning: "Ohio State University"

Technical information
- Licensing authority: FCC
- Facility ID: 66191
- Class: B
- ERP: 40,000 watts
- HAAT: 168.2 meters (552 ft)
- Transmitter coordinates: 40°01′02.0″N 83°01′11.0″W
- Repeater: 89.3 W202CE (Coshocton)

Links
- Public license information: Public file; LMS
- Webcast: Listen live
- Website: www.wosu.org

WOSU-FM (89.7 FM) is a non-commercial educational radio station licensed to Columbus, Ohio, featuring a public radio news and information format known as "89.7fm NPR News." Owned by Ohio State University, the station serves the Columbus metro area and has multiple repeaters throughout Ohio, making the station a multiple transmitter station.

WOSU-FM has an effective radiated power (ERP) of 40,000 watts. Its transmitter is on West Dodridge Road in Columbus, near the Olentangy River.

== History ==
=== Classical music ===
WOSU-FM signed on for the first time on December 13, 1949. It initially simulcast its sister station, WOSU 820 AM, from sign-on until just after sunset, when the AM station, a daytimer, had to go off the air. WOSU-FM then broadcast its own programming until signing off at 7:30 pm. In 1950, the broadcast day was extended to 9:15 pm. It began 24-hour operation in 1960, and began airing a fully separate schedule on October 1, 1968.

By 1952, it had begun simulcasting WOSU-AM's Ohio School of the Air broadcasts, continuing for over a decade.

WOSU-FM broadcast an all-classical format from 1980 until 2008.

It was the first station in Columbus to broadcast using HD Radio technology, beginning on April 5, 2004, at 3:30 p.m. It was also the first station in the United States to begin full-time multicast broadcasting when its HD-2 channel debuted on October 15, 2004.

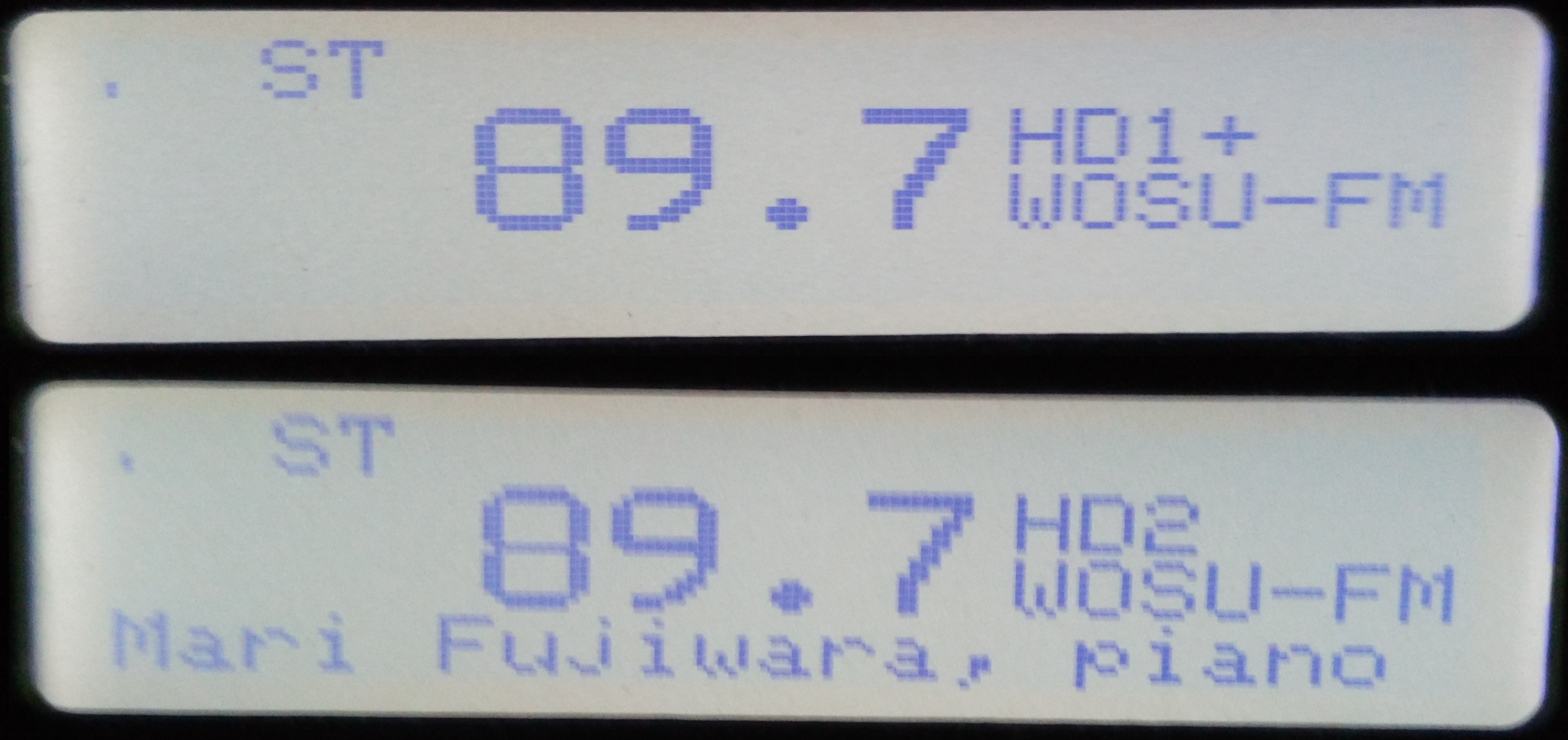
WOSU's HD Radio Channels on a SPARC Radio with PSD.

From January 14, 2008, WOSU-FM switched to a mixed news/classical format, introducing NPR news magazines during morning and afternoon drive times along with several popular NPR weekend programs such as Weekend Edition, Car Talk, and Wait Wait... Don't Tell Me!, plus This American Life from Public Radio International. Many of these programs were simulcast with sister station WOSU AM. WOSU-FM now features a 24-hour-a-day classical music service on its HD-2 digital subchannel as well as on its web site.

=== News and information ===
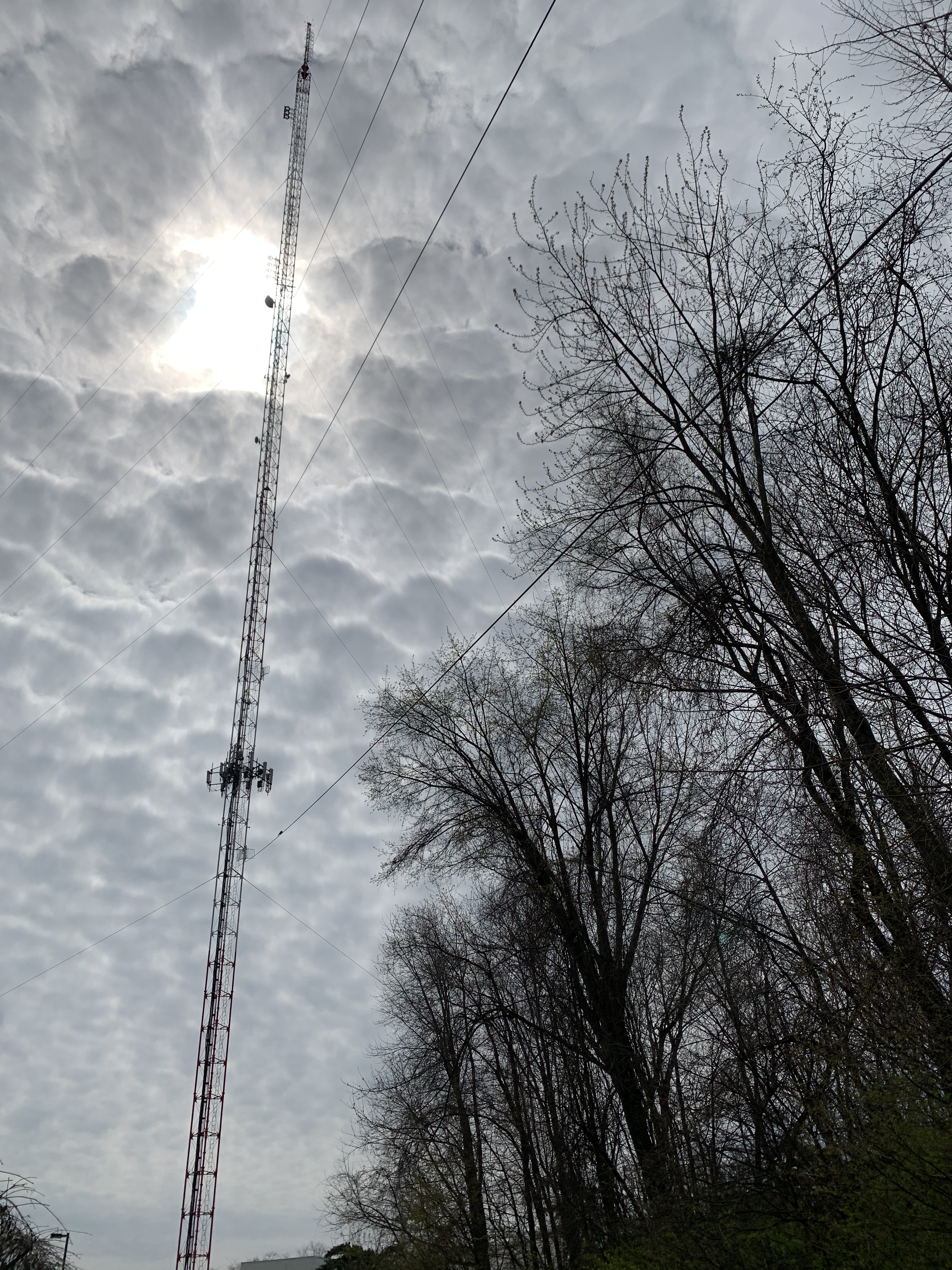
WOSU-FM's Transmitter near the Ohio State campus

In Fall 2010, Ohio State University purchased commercial station 101.1 WWCD. That station was soon given new call letters – WOSA – and switched to a full-time classical music station. WOSU-FM then ended most music programming and began simulcasting the NPR news and talk format on WOSU AM, though the FM station was now branded as the main station. Four of its satellite stations, WOSB in Marion, WOSE in Coshocton, WOSP in Portsmouth and WOSV in Mansfield were converted to repeaters of WOSA's classical format. In particular, WOSB and WOSV serve areas north of Columbus that do not get a good signal from the 101.1 frequency. These four stations, along with the newly-acquired WOSX in Granville, readded some of WOSU-FM's news programming, including Morning Edition, Weekend Edition, and All Things Considered, to their schedules on March 2, 2020, while continuing to simulcast WOSA for most of the day; the programming on WOSU-FM and WOSA did not change.

Original programming on WOSU-FM includes daily two-hour public affairs show All Sides with Ann Fisher. A weekly music program Bluegrass Ramble is also produced by WOSU-FM.

== Repeater ==
WOSU-FM's signal is repeated on W202CE 88.3 FM in Coshocton.

== See also ==
- WOSU
- WOSU-TV
- WOSA
