= Annunciation Radio =

Catholic radio station in Bowling Green, Ohio

- Type: (Catholic) radio
- Country: United States
- First air date: February 3, 2008 (18 years ago)
- Founded: 2006
- Headquarters: Toledo, Ohio
- Broadcast area: Ohio; Indiana (limited); Michigan (limited)
- Owner: Our Lady of Guadalupe Radio, Inc. (d/b/a Annunciation Radio)
- Affiliations: EWTN; Ave Maria Radio
- Affiliates: WNOC Bowling Green, OH; WRRO Edon, OH; WFOT Lexington, OH; WHRQ Sandusky, OH; WSHB Willard, OH
- Webcast: Listen live
- Official website: annunciationradio.com

Annunciation Radio is a regional network of five non-commercial radio stations in Ohio that feature a Catholic format with programming from both EWTN Radio and Ave Maria Radio. The flagship station, WNOC (89.7 FM), is licensed to Bowling Green, Ohio, and serves both Bowling Green and the Toledo metropolitan area, both part of the Diocese of Toledo. WNOC's broadcast reach is extended into Northwest Ohio, Northeastern Indiana and the Ohio regions of Sandusky, Willard, Ashland and Mansfield through four full-power FM repeaters. The network also carries programming originating from WNOC's studios which are located in Toledo. In addition to standard analog transmission on all five stations, Annunciation Radio programming is available online.

== History ==
Annunciation Radio began in 2006 as a venture by Toledo businessman and Deacon Michael Learned who, on February 3, 2008, launched a Sunday afternoon program on Toledo daytime talk station WTOD (1560 AM). It was sold by Cumulus Media to CSN Radio in March 2010 (which is now WWYC). The program briefly moved to Cumulus-owned WLQR (1470 AM) until the new station signed on on August 14, 2010. The construction permit was at first held by MCCR Inc. (Ministry for Catholic Charismatic Renewal.) While the new station was in its construction permit phase, a temporary working studio and office was set up at 2679 Brookford Drive in Toledo and a tower erected on Sugar Ridge Rd. near Bowling Green which is shared with WPFX. It is the second Catholic station to make its debut in the summer of 2010, the other being WJTA "Holy Family Radio" licensed in Glandorf, Ohio and transmitting from Leipsic.

In June 2010, two months before the station began broadcasting, Tim Kusner joined the radio station's staff. He was responsible for obtaining underwriters and gradually moved into producing, announcing, traffic management, managing the station Facebook page, and co-hosting the Friday morning live program Annunciation Radio Presents. WHRQ (88.1 FM) in Sandusky made its on-air debut on Monday, April 25, 2011, as a WNOC simulcast. The station's construction permit was secured in 2009 by the Port Clinton Knights of Columbus Home Association. Annunciation Radio's webstream also launched on August 26, 2010.

In May 2013 Annunciation Radio opened a permanent main studio and office located at 3662 Rugby Drive in south Toledo. In July 2013, it purchased Lexington station WFOT (89.5 FM), serving the Mansfield area, from St. Gabriel Radio based in Columbus. The transition of WFOT programming from St. Gabriel Radio to Annunciation Radio took place at 3:00 p.m. local time on Thursday, July 11, 2013. WFOT has been on the air since 2007.

In September 2013, Annunciation Radio purchased the construction permit of WSHB (90.9 FM) in Willard from the Mansfield Christian School, which owns WVMC in Mansfield. Approval of the sale was granted by the Federal Communications Commission on December 23, 2013. WSHB took to the air on Christmas Day, December 25, 2013.

== Network stations ==
The following stations comprise the Annunciation Radio network, with WNOC as the flagship:

Call sign	Frequency	City of license	FID	ERP (W)	HAAT	Class	Transmitter coordinates	FCC info
WNOC	89.7 FM	Bowling Green, Ohio	176349	5300	87.9 m (288 ft)	A	41°25′39″N 83°36′30″W	LMS
WFOT	89.5 FM	Lexington, Ohio	92877	360	304 m (997 ft)	A	40°43′36″N 82°36′59″W	LMS
WHRQ	88.1 FM	Sandusky, Ohio	172338	380	102.4 m (336 ft)	A	41°22′37.80″N 82°48′52.30″W	LMS
WRRO	88.9 FM	Edon, Ohio	175485	1400	96 m (315 ft)	A	41°32′58″N 84°46′18″W	LMS
WSHB	90.9 FM	Willard, Ohio	137442	450	71.5 m (235 ft)	A	41°02′53″N 82°40′52″W	LMS

== Former affiliate ==
- WLBJ-LP (104.1 FM) Fostoria owned by the Christopher Center Corporation (as "Christ The Shepherd Radio").

== See also ==
- Toledo Blade story of WNOC sign-on (August 21, 2010)
- Toledo Catholic Chronicle story of WNOC sign-on (August 30, 2010)
- Toledo Blade story of Annunciation Radio's fundraiser and planned launch. (May 30, 2009)
- Promotional flyer of New York Times author Raymond Arroyo's appearance at WNOC's launch.(in PDF format)
