= WFOT =

Simulcast of WNOC, Bowling Green, OH
- Lexington, Ohio; United States
- Broadcast area: Mid-Ohio
- Frequency: 89.5 MHz
- Branding: Annunciation Radio

Programming
- Format: Catholic
- Affiliations: EWTN; Ave Maria Radio

Ownership
- Owner: Our Lady of Guadalupe Radio, Inc.; (Annunciation Radio)

History
- First air date: February 17, 2007

Technical information
- Licensing authority: FCC
- Facility ID: 92877
- Class: A
- ERP: 360 watts
- HAAT: 304 feet (93 m)
- Transmitter coordinates: 40°43′36″N 82°36′59″W

Links
- Public license information: Public file; LMS
- Webcast: Listen live
- Website: annunciationradio.com

WFOT (89.5 FM) is a non-commercial radio station licensed to Lexington, Ohio, featuring a Catholicm–based format as a repeater station in the Annunciation Radio network. Owned by Our Lady of Guadalupe Radio, Inc. (d/b/a Annunciation Radio), the station serves the Mansfield, Ashland and Mount Vernon areas as an affiliate of EWTN Radio and Ave Maria Radio. In addition to a standard analog transmission, WFOT's programming is available online.

== History ==
WFOT began in February 2007 as a near-simulcast of WVKO in Columbus from 2007 to 2011 and then WVSG in Columbus from 2011 until July 2013 when it was part of St. Gabriel Radio. St. Gabriel Radio began broadcasting in 2005 on the former WUCO (now WDLR) in Marysville, Ohio until 2010. Though WUCO was the first to air Catholic programming for the Columbus Diocese, this made WFOT the second such station in that diocese.

In June 2013 Annunciation Radio purchased WFOT which on July 11, 2013 at 3:00 pm, programming transitioned from St. Gabriel Radio to Annunciation Radio. Sale and transfer of license of WFOT was granted by the FCC on June 24, 2013, thus making WFOT the fifth full-time Catholic station in the Toledo Diocese and the third station in Annunciation's regional network.
