= WOSA =

Radio station in Grove City–Columbus, Ohio

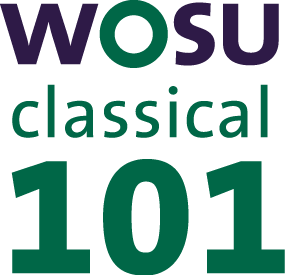
- Grove City, Ohio; United States
- Broadcast area: Columbus metro area
- Frequency: 101.1 MHz (HD Radio)
- Branding: Classical 101fm

Programming
- Language: English
- Format: Classical music

Ownership
- Owner: Ohio State University; (WOSU Public Media)
- Sister stations: WOSU-FM, WOSU-TV

History
- First air date: August 21, 1990
- Former call signs: WWCD (1990–2010)
- Call sign meaning: "Ohio State University"

Technical information
- Licensing authority: FCC
- Facility ID: 28644
- Class: A
- ERP: 6,000 watts
- HAAT: 100 meters (330 ft)
- Transmitter coordinates: 39°48′50.0″N 83°03′19.0″W
- Repeaters: 91.1 WOSB (Marion); 91.5 WOSP (Portsmouth); 91.1 WOSE (Coshocton); 91.7 WOSV (Mansfield); 91.1 WOSX (Granville)

Links
- Public license information: Public file; LMS
- Webcast: Listen live
- Website: news.wosu.org/classical-101

WOSA (101.1 FM) is a non-commercial educational radio station licensed to Grove City, Ohio, featuring a classical music format known as "Classical 101fm". Owned by Ohio State University, the station serves Columbus, Ohio, and much of the surrounding Columbus metro area, extending its reach into Mansfield, Marion and Southern Ohio with five full-power repeaters. The WOSA studios are located on North Pearl Street near the Ohio State University campus, while the station transmitter resides off of Borror Road in Lockbourne. In addition to a standard analog transmission, WOSA is available online. It is one of a few non-commercial stations in the United States to broadcast outside of its recommended frequency range (88-92 MHz).

== History ==
=== WWCD (1990–2010) ===
CD101 logo

WWCD began broadcasting on August 21, 1990. The first song played on the station was "Hello, Hello, Hello, Hello, Hello, (Petrol)" by the Dublin, Ireland band Something Happens. The station was long owned by Fun With Radio, LLC., whose founder, Roger Vaughn, purchased the station from Video Services in 1992. WWCD and its successor station, WWCD (102.5 FM), has always been either owned or operated by interests in metro Columbus, and is one of the few remaining independent radio stations in the U.S. playing alternative rock.

WWCD also lays claim to being one of the first stations in the United States to be simulcast and on Internet radio. In a March 2006 Radio & Records list of the top 20 alternative rock radio stations in the United States, WWCD was ranked #4 in the country and #1 east of the Mississippi River.

WWCD's longtime program director throughout the late 1990s and 2000s was afternoon DJ Andy "Andyman" Davis. With the station almost since its inception, Davis previously served as the station's music director. Davis died of a suspected heart attack while on vacation in Michigan with his family on July 18, 2010. The annual "Andyman-a-Thon" also continues in his name.

=== 2010 "frequency shift" ===
Ohio State University, under licensee WOSU Public Media, announced a $4.8 million purchase of WWCD from Fun With Radio, LLC. on June 30, 2010. At the same time, Fun With Radio entered into a local marketing agreement with the WHIZ Media Group to take over programming on WCVZ (102.5 FM) in Baltimore immediately, with a future option for purchase. Although generally reported and regarded as a "frequency shift" for WWCD, Fun With Radio took over programming and operations of WCVZ; changed the station's format from country to alternative as a direct simulcast of WWCD; and rebranded the station as "CD101 @ 102.5".

The purchase of the original WWCD was consummated that December 14. WOSU Public Media then changed WWCD's callsign to WOSA; changed the station's format to classical music; and rebranded the station as "Classical 101fm". Concurrently, WCVZ's callsign was changed to WWCD.

=== WOSA (2010–present) ===
WOSA's roots date back to WOSU-FM's long history as a classical outlet, airing the format on a full-time basis from 1980 until 2008 as a complement to WOSU, which would air more traditional public radio fare. Starting on January 14, 2008, WOSU-FM switched to a mixed news/classical format, introducing NPR news magazines during morning and evening drive-times along with assorted NPR and PRI weekend programs. Many of these programs were simulcast with its AM sister station WOSU, which still programmed a separate news/talk format. As a result, WOSU established a 24-hour all classical music service on its second HD Radio channel and on its web site.

Upon WOSA's establishment, it assumed WOSU-FM's 24-hour HD-2 and internet-only all classical music service on a full-time basis, operating as a non-commercial station. In addition, WOSU-FM's format changed to news/talk as a simulcast with WOSU (subsequently divested). WOSU also converted four repeater stations for WOSU-FM—WOSB in Marion, WOSE in Coshocton, WOSP in Portsmouth and WOSV in Mansfield—to repeaters of WOSA. In particular, WOSB and WOSV serve areas north of Columbus that are not served well by the new 101.1 frequency.

On March 2, 2020, WOSA's repeaters, along with the newly-acquired WOSX in Granville, readded some of WOSU-FM's news programming, including Morning Edition, Weekend Edition, and All Things Considered, to their schedules, while continuing to simulcast WOSA for most of the day. WOSA itself remains all-classical.

== Programming ==
=== Repeaters ===
Most of WOSA's programming is simulcast on WOSE Coshocton (91.1 FM), WOSB Marion (91.1 FM), WOSP Portsmouth (91.5 FM), WOSV Mansfield (91.7 FM), and WOSX Granville (91.1 FM).

== See also ==
- WOSU-FM
- WVSG - the former WOSU
- WOSU-TV
