= Glandorf, Germany =

Glandorf
- Municipality
- Coat of arms

- Location of Glandorf within Osnabrück district
- Interactive map of Glandorf
- Location within Germany Location within Lower Saxony
- Coordinates: 52°05′02″N 8°00′08″E
- Country: Germany
- State: Lower Saxony
- District: Osnabrück
- Subdivisions: 6

Government
  - Mayor: Torsten Dimek

Area
  - Total: 59.88 km^{2} (23.12 sq mi)
- Elevation: 68 m (223 ft)

Population (2025-12-31)
  - Total: 6,500
  - Density: 110/km^{2} (280/sq mi)
- Time zone: UTC+01:00 (CET)
  - Summer (DST): UTC+02:00 (CEST)
- Postal codes: 49219
- Dialling codes: 05426
- Vehicle registration: OS, BSB, MEL, WTL
- Website: www.glandorf.de

Glandorf is a municipality in the district of Osnabrück, in Lower Saxony, Germany. It is situated close to the Teutoburg Forest, 24 km south of Osnabrück. The name Glandorf derives from Glanathorpe - which means settlement on the creek Glane - and was first mentioned in records in 1070.

The municipality includes Glandorf and six local subdivisions which are Averfehrden (formerly Narendorf), Schierloh, Schwege, Sudendorf, Westendorf, and Laudiek.

Glandorf's landmark is a windmill that is constructed following the example of Dutch windmill design. It was built in 1840. Since 2000, civil weddings can be celebrated in the windmill.

== Churches ==
The oldest parts of the Roman Catholic Church St. Johannis (St. John the Baptist) date from the 13th century and were documentary mentioned the first time in 1275. In 1636 the church was burned down by Swedish troops during the Thirty Years' War and was rebuilt with the old material. Between 1817 and 1820 a complete modification of the building occurred.

Another Roman Catholic church is St. Marien (St. Mary) in Schwege. It was built 1863 due to the teacher Mathias Niehaus's initiative.

The Protestant church "Kripplein Christi" (Crib of Christ) is a wooden church and was first built 1912 in Holsen-Ahle near by Bünde. In 1952 the church was bought by the Protestant community of Glandorf and was rebuilt on a new foundation.

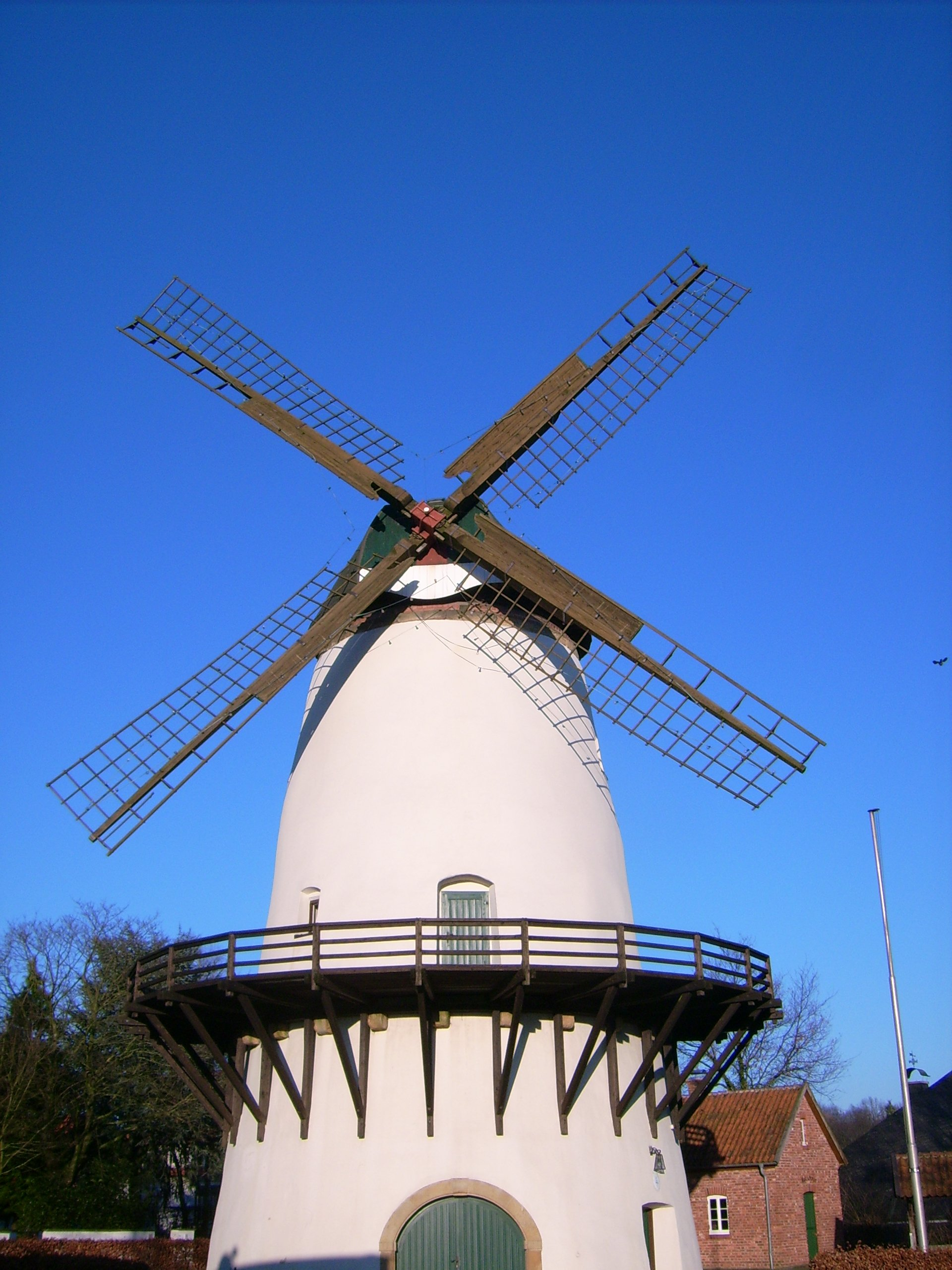
The Windmill

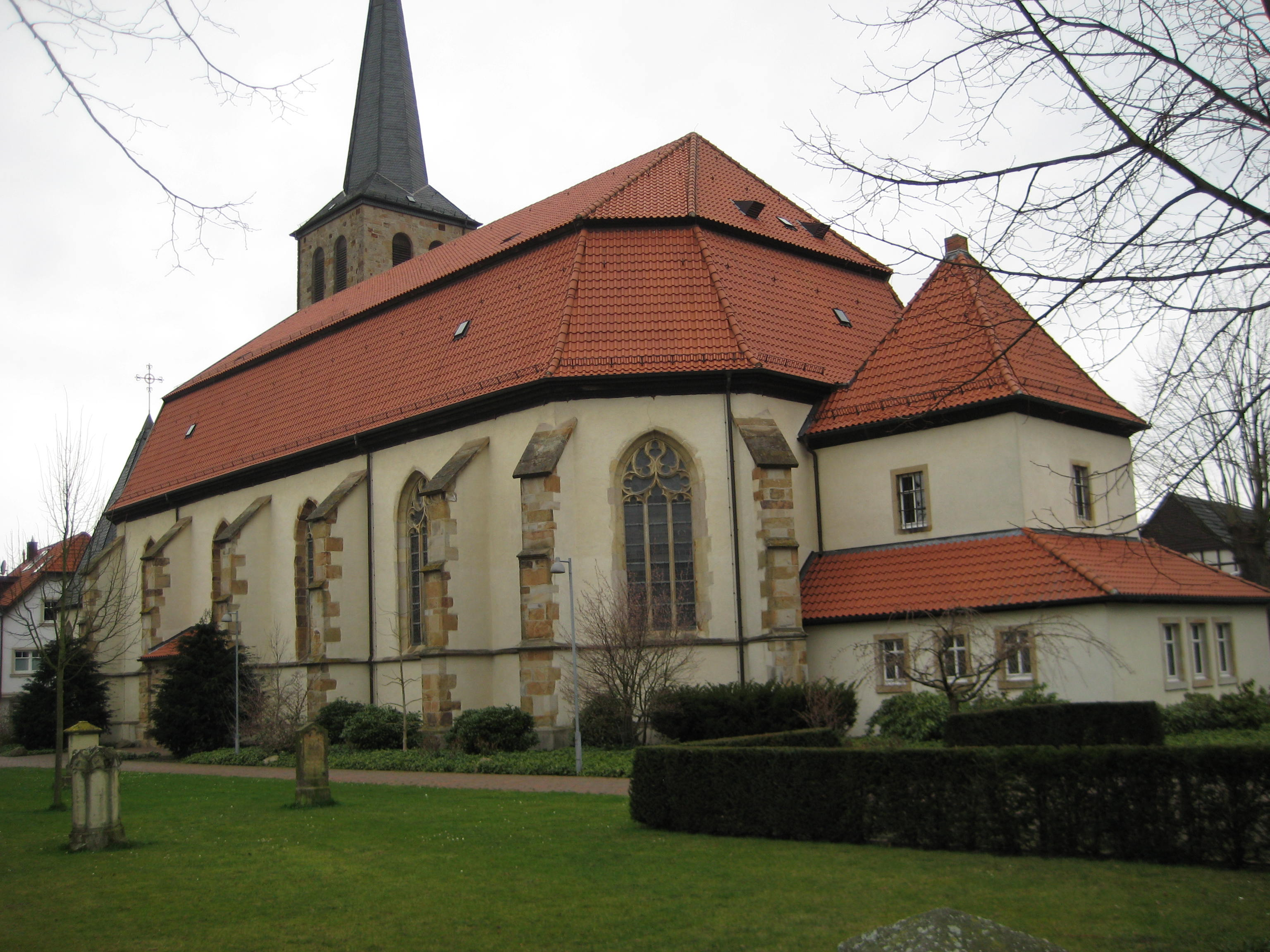
St. Johannis

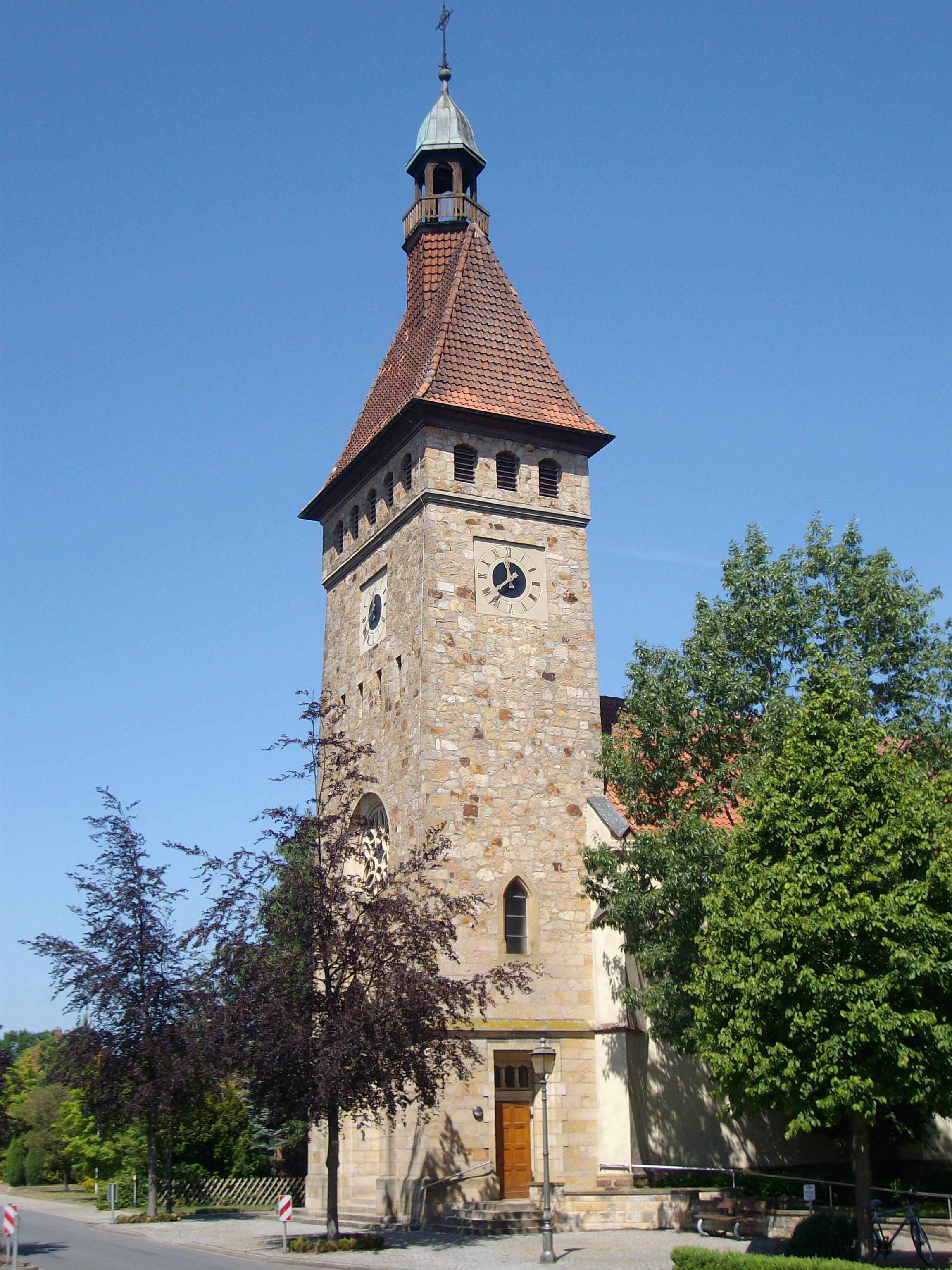
St. Marien in Schwege

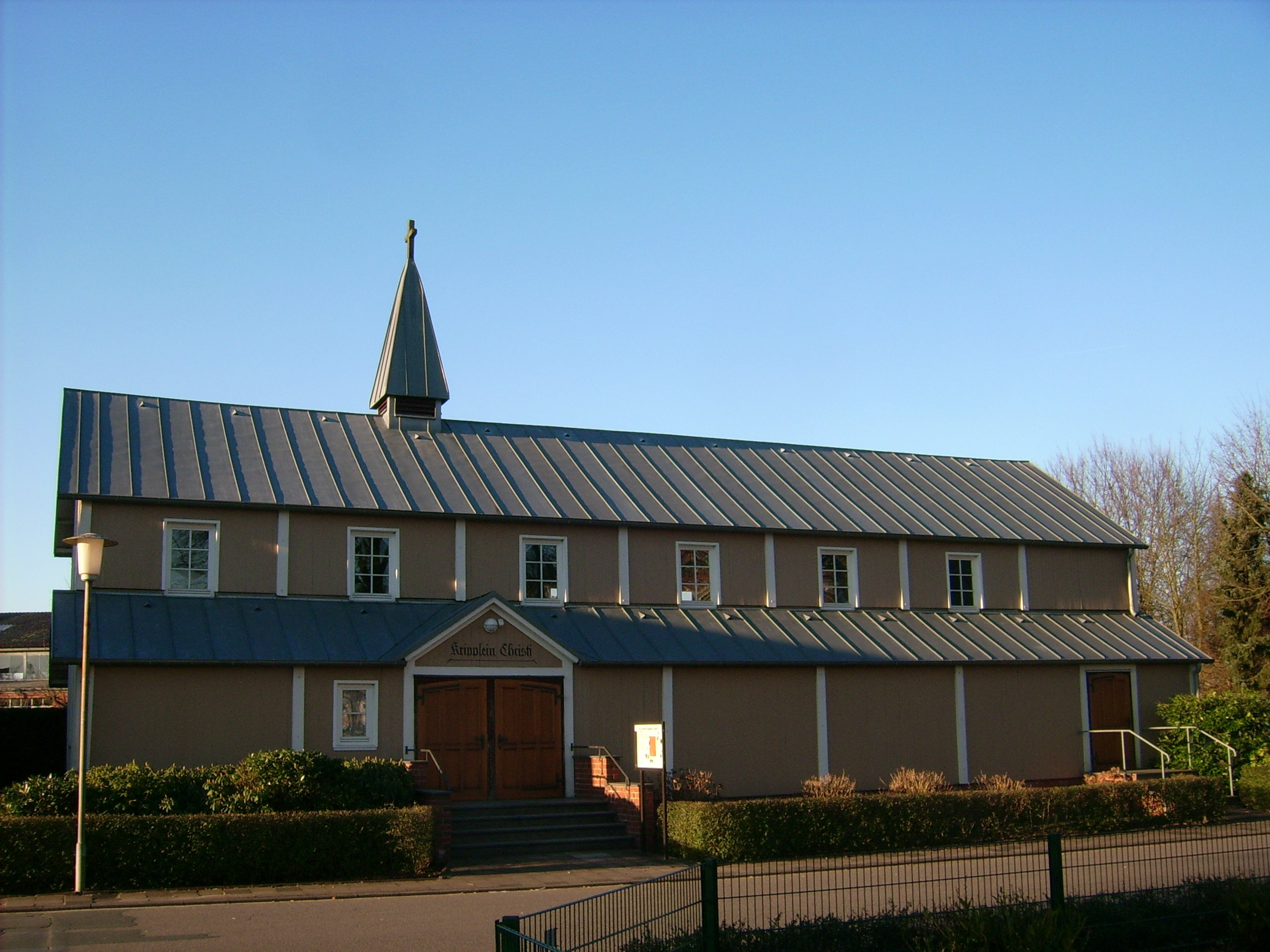
Kripplein Christi

== Partnerships ==
- Glandorf, Ohio
- Lichtenberg, Mecklenburg-Vorpommern
