= WVSG (AM) =

Catholic radio station in Columbus, Ohio

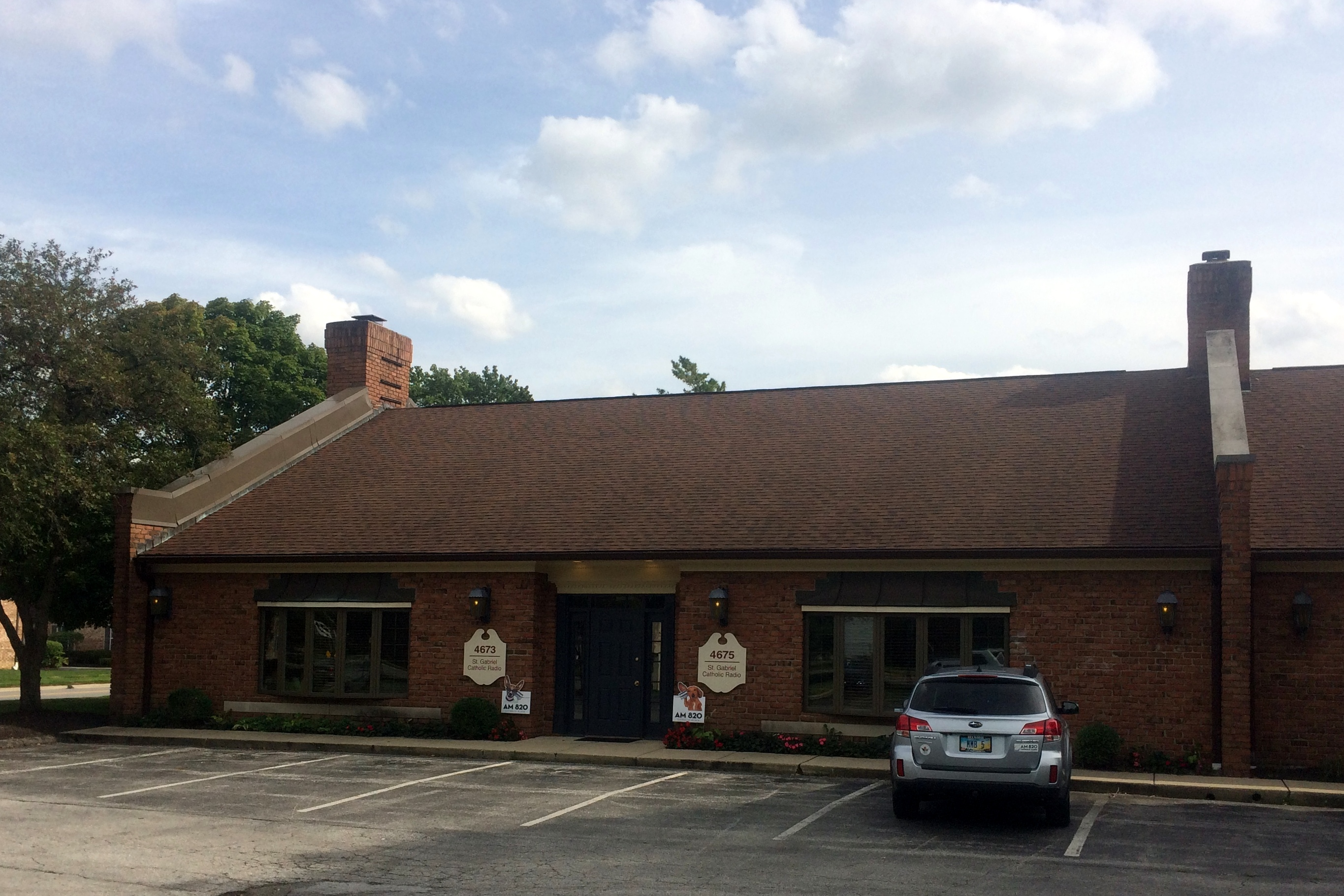
- Columbus, Ohio; United States
- Broadcast area: Columbus metro area
- Frequency: 820 kHz
- Branding: St. Gabriel Radio

Programming
- Format: Catholic talk
- Affiliations: EWTN Radio

Ownership
- Owner: St. Gabriel Radio Inc.

History
- First air date: April 20, 1920; 106 years ago
- Former call signs: 8XI (1920–1921); 8YO (1921–1922); WEAO (1922–1933); WOSU (1933–2011)
- Call sign meaning: "Voice of St. Gabriel"

Technical information
- Licensing authority: FCC
- Class: B
- Power: 6,500 watts (day); 790 watts (night)
- Transmitter coordinates: 39°54′35″N 83°03′23″W

Links
- Public license information: Public file; LMS
- Webcast: Listen live
- Website: stgabrielradio.com

WVSG (820 kHz, "St. Gabriel Radio") is a non-commercial AM radio station in Columbus, Ohio. It airs local Catholic talk programming in addition to the EWTN Global Catholic Radio Network. WVSG's schedule is simulcast on WSGR, 88.3 FM in New Boston, Ohio.

WVSG broadcasts with 6,500 watts non-directional in the daytime, offering secondary coverage to almost half of Ohio, as far west as Dayton and the outer suburbs of Cincinnati and as far north as the outer suburbs of Toledo. Because 820 AM is a clear channel frequency, at night a six-tower array is used in a directional pattern to protect the signal of Class A WBAP Fort Worth, power is reduced at night to 790 watts. WVSG's transmitter is off Red Rock Boulevard in Columbus.

== History ==
=== Ohio State University ===
The station, the oldest radio station in Columbus, was originally owned by Ohio State University. It was one of many radio stations signed on by universities in the early days of radio.

On March 23, 1920, the university was granted an experimental license with the call sign 8XI. Its debut broadcast was on April 20, 1920. It featured a speech by university president William Oxley Thompson.

In the fall of 1921 8XI's experimental license was deleted, and the university was issued a Technical and Training School station license with the call sign 8YO.

Effective December 1, 1921, the Department of Commerce, which regulated radio at this time, adopted regulations requiring that stations making broadcasts intended for the general public obtain a "Limited Commercial" license. On June 3, 1922, the university was issued its first broadcasting station license, with the call sign WEAO. The call letters were randomly assigned from a sequential roster of available call signs. WEAO was the broadcasting site for Ohio School of the Air, simulcasting its inaugural January 7, 1929, classroom programs with Cincinnati's WLW.

In 1933, the call letters were changed to WOSU, representing Ohio State University's initials.

In 1949, an FM station was added, WOSU-FM on 89.7 MHz. At first, the FM station largely simulcast the AM's programming. Because 820 AM was a daytimer, required to go off the air at night, WOSU-FM was able to continue the AM's programs into the evening. In 1956, a TV station was added, WOSU-TV Channel 34.

=== WOSU ===
For much of the 1960s and '70s, WOSU's programming was mostly locally originated, featuring diverse music programs from classical and jazz, and later included the seasonal Metropolitan Opera radio broadcasts on Saturday afternoons, hosted by long-time announcer Milton Cross and later by Peter Allen after Cross' death. The station participated with the gradual evolution of National Public Radio (NPR). It also broadcast live remotes from the Ohio State Fair.

By the year 2000, WOSU primarily aired NPR news and talk programming, supplemented by programs from American Public Media and Public Radio International. It was also home to the Ohio State ice hockey and women's basketball broadcasts. On weekend evenings the station featured 12 hours of bluegrass music on a program called The Bluegrass Ramble, hosted by a group of three rotating announcers. In addition to its sports and news coverage, the station produced an award-winning talk show, Open Line with host Fred Andrle, who retired in May 2009 after 25 years in radio. In September 2009 Andrle's program was replaced by All Sides With Ann Fisher, hosted by former Columbus Dispatch reporter and columnist Ann Fisher, who came to WOSU with 20 years of journalism experience.

Ohio State eventually decided to concentrate its radio broadcasting efforts on the FM band. In 2010, the university purchased station WWCD/101.1 FM, changing its callsign to WOSA. The 101.1 station mostly plays classical music, leaving WOSU-FM 89.7 FM to concentrate on news and informational programming. WOSU-FM 89.7 and WOSU 820 began simulcasting again, carrying NPR news and talk shows. The FM signal was branded as the main station, under the moniker "89.7 FM NPR News". The university also announced that it was putting WOSU 820 AM up for sale.

In September 2011, a deal was finalized to sell 820 AM, pending Federal Communications Commission (FCC) approval. St. Gabriel Radio agreed to pay $2 million. The sale and transfer of license was approved by the FCC on November 7, 2011. No formal announcement of farewell or final goodbye to listeners was made prior to the final shutdown of WOSU. The station ended its regular NPR and local news broadcasts at 5 p.m. on December 9, 2011, after which it aired a continuous announcement loop informing listeners that its news and talk format would continue on 89.7 WOSU-FM. The announcements continued until 9:00 a.m. on December 14, when the signal was abruptly shut down in the middle of the sentence "I'm Mandie Trimble, W...", ending before the full WOSU call sign was spoken.

=== WVSG ===
A new callsign was granted on December 15, 2011: WVSG. The station returned to the air on December 17 after 3 days of silence. The station made its official debut at 6 p.m. on December 20.

The introduction of WVSG was part of a series of station acquisitions and deacquisitions by St. Gabriel Radio, Inc. in its work to provide Catholic programming for the Roman Catholic Diocese of Columbus. Named for the Archangel Gabriel – the patron saint of communication workers – St. Gabriel Radio initially purchased WUCO 1270 kHz (now WDLR) in Marysville in 2005 from Frontier Broadcasting. WUCO became the first full-time Catholic radio station licensed in Ohio since Cleveland's WMIH (now WCCR) was sold to Radio Disney in 1998. After this purchase, WUCO's studios and offices were moved from Marysville to Columbus, the diocese's hub, thus increasing its volunteer and listener base.

In 2007, St. Gabriel Radio began simulcasting WUCO's Catholic programming over WVKO (1580 AM), under a lease agreement with station owner Bernard, Ohio L.L.C. WVKO's superior signal provided better coverage of the Columbus region than WUCO's less powerful directional signal. WVKO had previously aired a liberal progressive talk format, and the initial plan was that St. Gabriel Radio would eventually purchase the station. WUCO was sold in January 2010 to ICS Communications, and after Ohio State University announced that WOSU was for sale, St. Gabriel Radio decided it would purchase that station instead of WVKO. A fundraiser, "Leave a Legacy", focused on raising funds for the purchase.

The transition of St. Gabriel programming from 1580 to 820 AM took place on at 6 p.m. on December 20, 2011, during the broadcast of "The Local Spotlight Show", which began that evening on WVKO and concluded on WVSG. WVKO (now WXGT) then began airing continuing announcements informing St. Gabriel listeners to switch to AM 820, until it returned to a progressive talk format at 6 a.m. on January 2, 2012.

St. Gabriel Radio also owned and operated WFOT 89.5 MHz, licensed to Lexington and serving the Mansfield area as a near-simulcast of the AM station. WFOT made its on-air debut in February 2007. WFOT now broadcasts the programming of Annunciation Radio based in Toledo.

St. Gabriel Radio's mission is to reach the entire Columbus diocese, and WVSG almost accomplishes this during the daytime hours, with the exception of the far southern region around Portsmouth. In January 2019, the southern coverage was improved by establishing a simulcast over WSGR 88.3 FM in New Boston.

== See also ==
- List of initial AM-band station grants in the United States
