= Glandorf, Ohio =

- Village
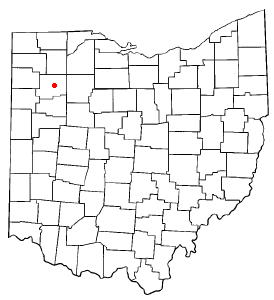
- Location of Glandorf, Ohio

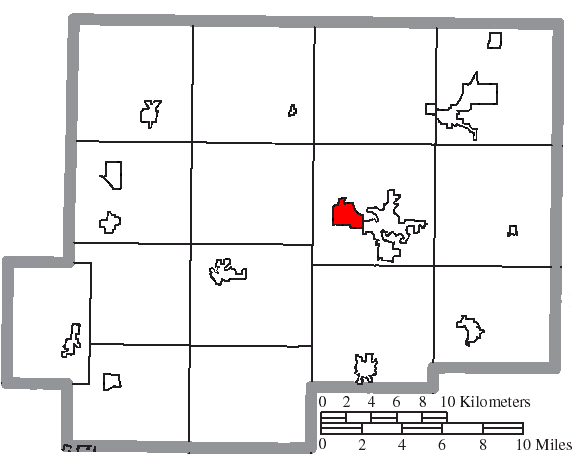
- Location of Glandorf in Putnam County
- Coordinates: 41°01′40″N 84°04′45″W
- Country: United States
- State: Ohio
- County: Putnam
- Township: Ottawa

Government
  - Mayor: Charlie Schroeder

Area
  - Total: 1.64 sq mi (4.24 km^{2})
  - Land: 1.64 sq mi (4.24 km^{2})
  - Water: 0 sq mi (0.00 km^{2})
- Elevation: 722 ft (220 m)

Population (2020)
  - Total: 969
  - Estimate (2023): 974
  - Density: 592.3/sq mi (228.67/km^{2})
- Time zone: UTC-5 (Eastern (EST))
  - Summer (DST): UTC-4 (EDT)
- ZIP code: 45848
- Area code: 419
- FIPS code: 39-30282
- GNIS feature ID: 2398967
- Website: https://villageofglandorf.com/

Glandorf is a village in Putnam County, Ohio, United States. The population was 969 at the 2020 census.

== History ==
Glandorf was founded by Johann Wilhelm Horstmann and six other men from Glandorf, Germany in 1834. They embarked on the ship Columbus on September 7, 1833, in Amsterdam, landed November 6, 1833, in New York, and purchased some land in Putnam County in December. Members of this group were Johann F. Kahle, Wilhelm Gülker, Christian Strop, F. Wischmann, Friedrich Bredeick and Mathias and Friedrich Bockrath. Kahle bought land at Greensburg approximately 5 miles to the west of Glandorf and named it "Maria Camp". Horstmann's land was named Glandorf. Their wives and ten other families from Glandorf followed in 1834. This was just the beginning of further emigration from Germany to Ohio and other US states. After his death on February 21, 1843, Horstmann left his land to the community.

In 1834, Horstmann built a log house to serve as church, school, and rectory. The new parish was placed under the patronage of St. John the Baptist. In 1835, the log house was replaced by a wooden church with a steeple, a bell and a pulpit from hallowed-out sycamore log. A brick church followed between 1846 and 1848. In 1878, the Neo-Gothic church St. John the Baptist was erected and consecrated on December 15. In 1992, a fire started in the sacristy of the church, and the sacristy and its contents were a complete loss. The entire interior had to be repainted. A convent of the German sisters' order of the Society of the Precious Blood was founded in 1849. They cultivated the land which was originally owned by Horstmann and served as teachers. The convent was abandoned in 1917.

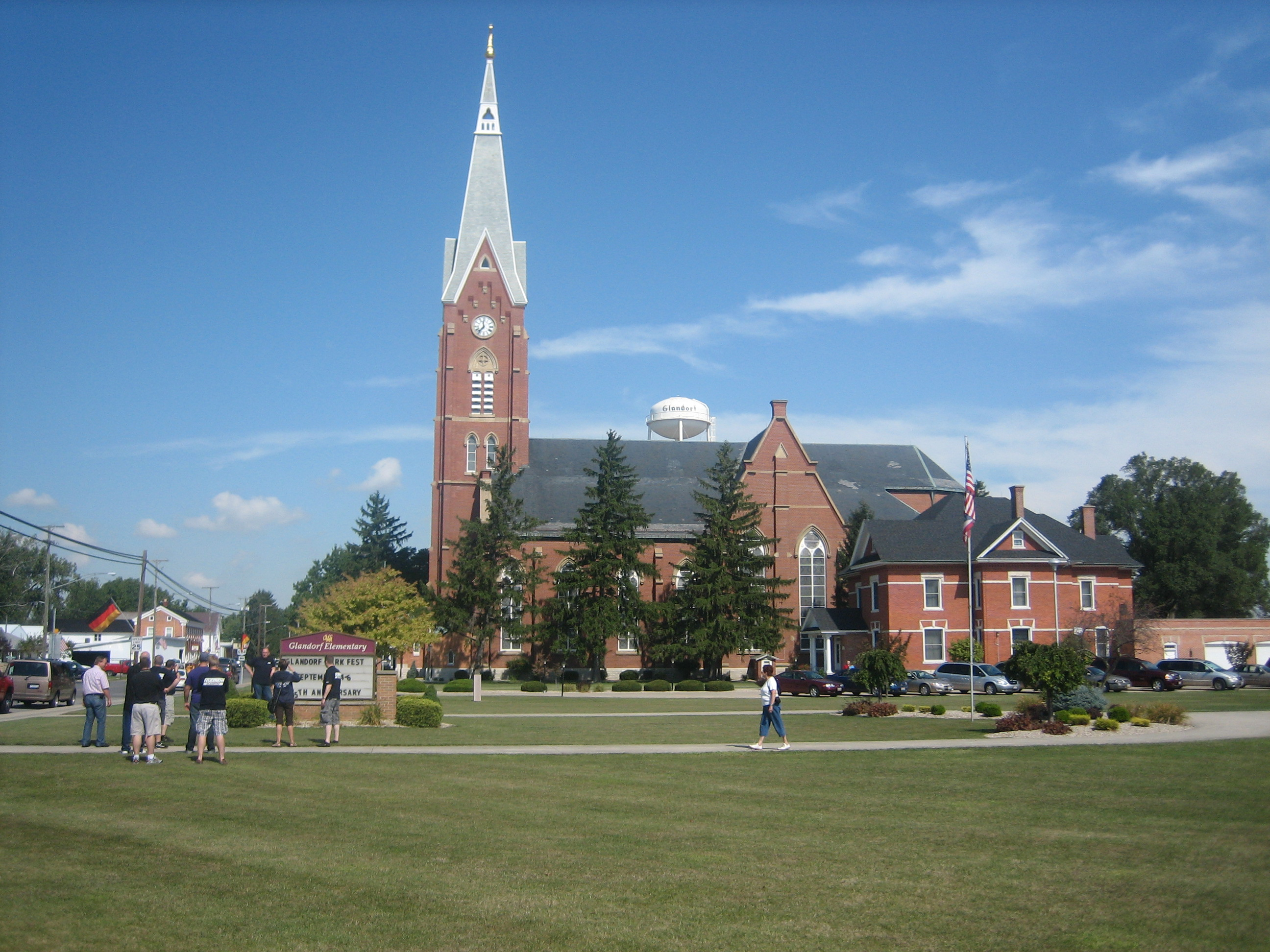
St. John the Baptist

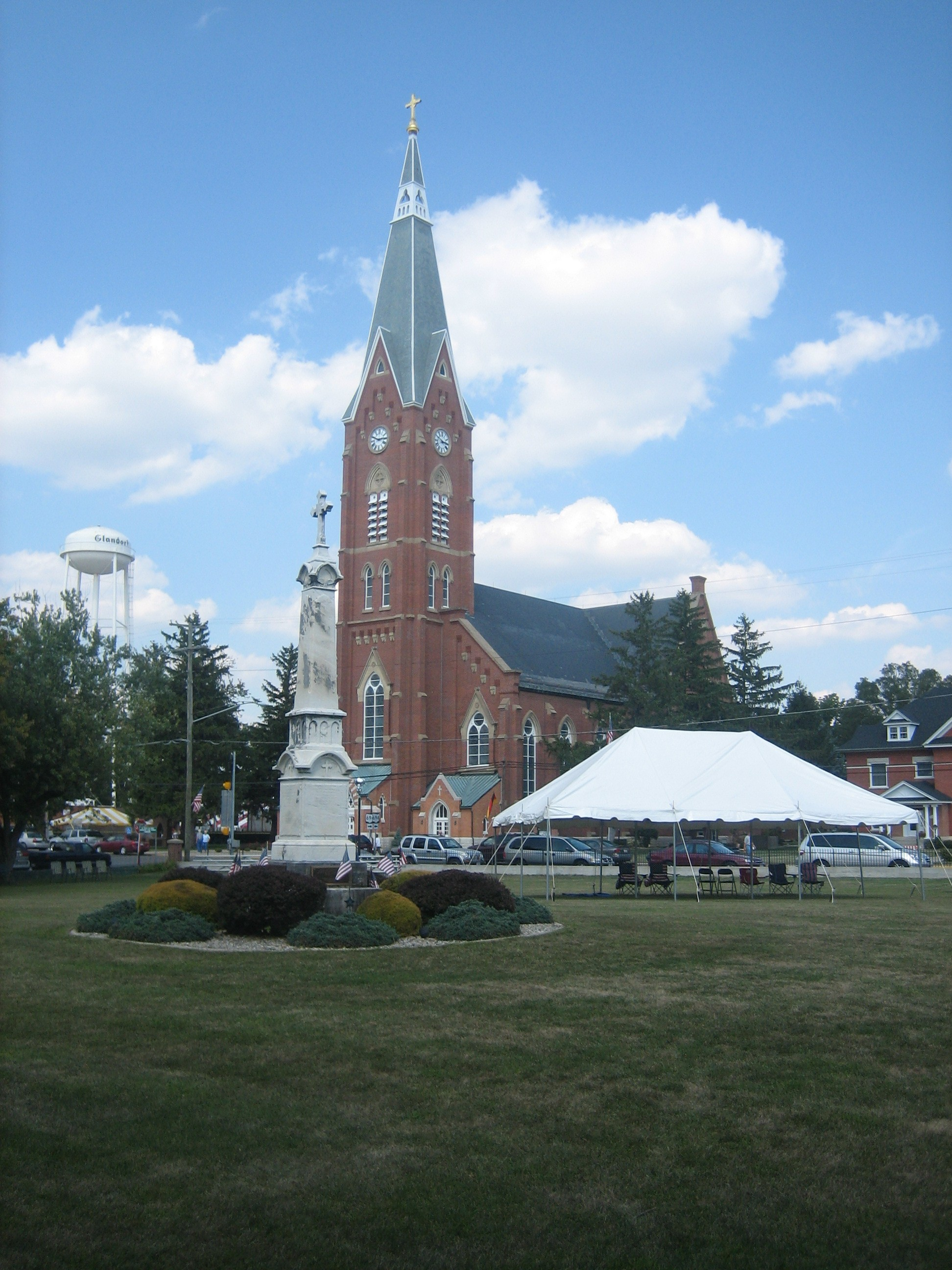
St. John the Baptist church with monument of Johann Wilhelm Horstmann

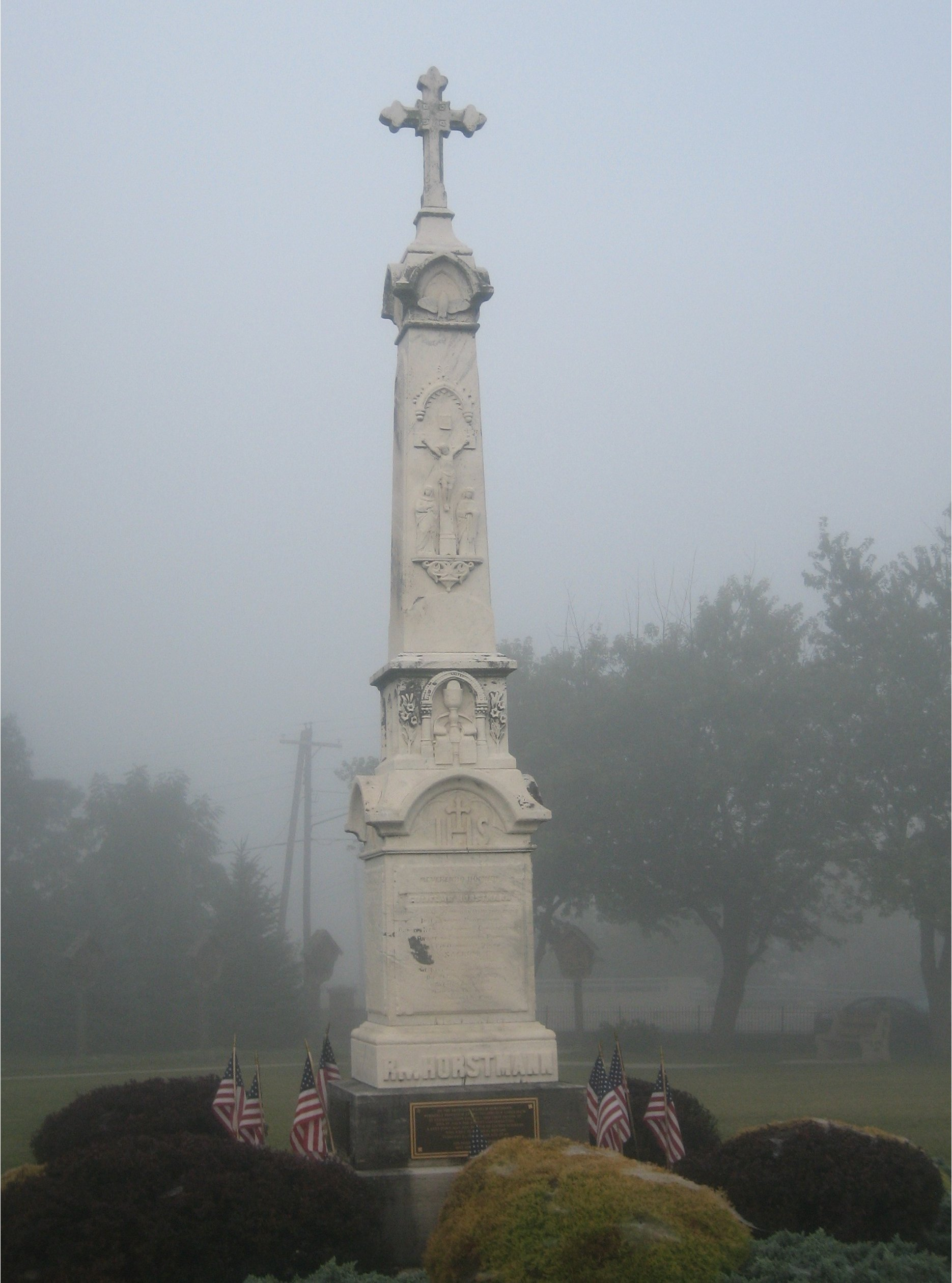
Monument of Johann Wilhelm Horstmann

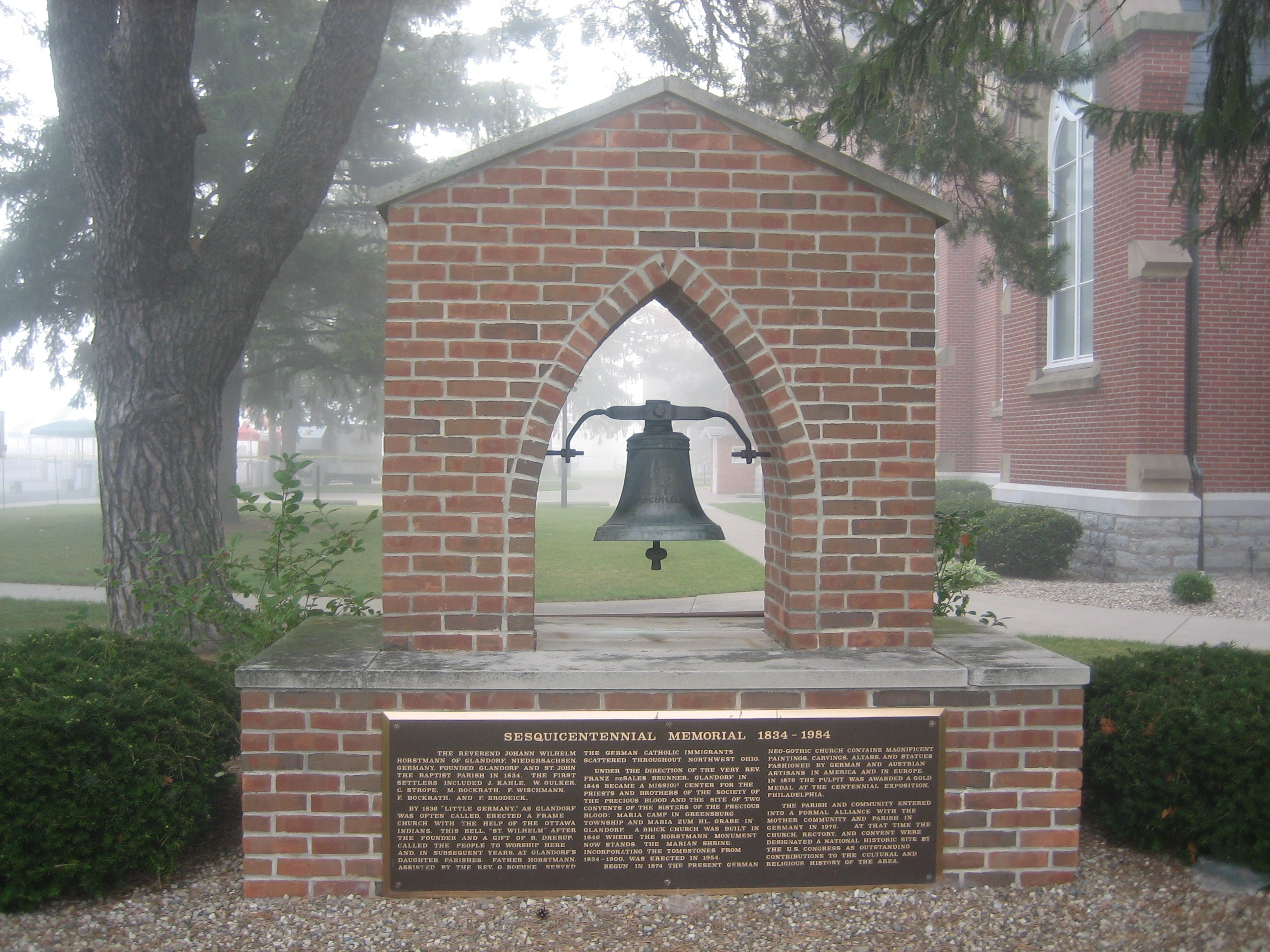
Sesquicentennial Memorial 1834 - 1984

== Geography ==
According to the United States Census Bureau, the village has a total area of 1.62 square miles (4.20 km^{2}), all land.

== Demographics ==
Historical population
Census	Pop.	Note	%±
1890	571		—
1900	749		31.2%
1910	558		−25.5%
1920	499		−10.6%
1930	455		−8.8%
1940	483		6.2%
1950	479		−0.8%
1960	747		55.9%
1970	732		−2.0%
1980	746		1.9%
1990	829		11.1%
2000	919		10.9%
2010	1,001		8.9%
2020	969		−3.2%
2023 (est.)	974	▲	0.5%
U.S. Decennial Census

96.2% speak English and 3.8% German.

=== 2010 census ===
As of the census of 2010, there were 1,001 people, 340 households, and 263 families living in the village. The population density was 617.9 inhabitants per square mile (238.6/km^{2}). There were 351 housing units at an average density of 216.7 per square mile (83.7/km^{2}). The racial makeup of the village was 98.3% White, 0.8% Asian, 0.1% from other races, and 0.8% from two or more races. Hispanic or Latino people of any race were 1.6% of the population.

There were 340 households, of which 40.6% had children under the age of 18 living with them, 70.3% were married couples living together, 4.7% had a female householder with no husband present, 2.4% had a male householder with no wife present, and 22.6% were non-families. 20.3% of all households were made up of individuals, and 10% had someone living alone who was 65 years of age or older. The average household size was 2.81 and the average family size was 3.30.

The median age in the village was 38.8 years. 28.6% of residents were under the age of 18; 5.9% were between the ages of 18 and 24; 24.1% were from 25 to 44; 25.6% were from 45 to 64; and 15.9% were 65 years of age or older. The gender makeup of the village was 47.3% male and 52.7% female.

=== 2000 census ===
As of the census of 2000, there were 919 people, 286 households, and 237 families living in the village. The population density was 599.4 inhabitants per square mile (231.4/km^{2}). There were 297 housing units at an average density of 193.7 per square mile (74.8/km^{2}). The racial makeup of the village was 98.59% White, 0.11% Asian, 0.44% from other races, and 0.87% from two or more races. Hispanic or Latino people of any race were 1.09% of the population.

There were 286 households, out of which 43.7% had children under the age of 18 living with them, 74.8% were married couples living together, 4.5% had a female householder with no husband present, and 16.8% were non-families. 15.7% of all households were made up of individuals, and 7.0% had someone living alone who was 65 years of age or older. The average household size was 2.93 and the average family size was 3.29.

In the village, the population was spread out, with 28.2% under the age of 18, 5.3% from 18 to 24, 29.3% from 25 to 44, 17.8% from 45 to 64, and 19.4% who were 65 years of age or older. The median age was 37 years. For every 100 females there were 93.5 males. For every 100 females age 18 and over, there were 88.0 males.

The median income for a household in the village was $52,083, and the median income for a family was $56,528. Males had a median income of $38,750 versus $25,500 for females. The per capita income for the village was $19,055. None of the families and 0.4% of the population were living below the poverty line, including no under eighteens and 3.1% of those over 64.

== Education ==
Ottawa-Glandorf Local Schools operates Glandorf Elementary School in the village.
