= National Register of Historic Places listings in Logan County, Ohio =

Location of Logan County in Ohio

This is a list of the National Register of Historic Places listings in Logan County, Ohio.

This is intended to be a complete list of the properties and districts on the National Register of Historic Places in Logan County, Ohio, United States. The locations of National Register properties and districts for which the latitude and longitude coordinates are included below, may be seen in an online map.

There are 10 properties and districts listed on the National Register in the county.

This National Park Service list is complete through NPS recent listings posted March 14, 2025.

== Current listings ==
	Name on the Register	Image	Date listed	Location	City or town	Description
1	Downtown Bellefontaine Historic District	Downtown Bellefontaine Historic District	April 27, 2020 (#100005213)	Roughly bounded by Elm St., Sandusky Ave., Madriver St., and Auburn Ave. 40°21′38″N 83°45′36″W	Bellefontaine	
2	Dunns Pond Mound	Dunns Pond Mound	July 30, 1974 (#74001548)	Junction of Mohawk and Mound Aves., northeast of Dunns Pond; 40°28′33″N 83°51′46″W	Washington Township	A Hopewell burial mound
3	First Concrete Street in U.S.	First Concrete Street in U.S.	February 25, 1974 (#74001547)	Court Avenue; 40°21′37″N 83°45′33″W	Bellefontaine	Only remaining portion of the first concrete pavement in the United States, built in 1891
4	Lake Ridge Island Mounds	Lake Ridge Island Mounds	October 16, 1974 (#74001549)	Western side of State Route 368 on Lake Ridge Island; 40°29′24″N 83°51′36″W	Stokes Township	Group of small hills thought to be Native American mounds
5	William Lawrence House	William Lawrence House	August 24, 1979 (#79001884)	325 N. Main St. 40°21′55″N 83°45′35″W	Bellefontaine	Home of prominent politician William Lawrence
6	Logan County Courthouse	Logan County Courthouse	June 4, 1973 (#73001497)	101 S. Main St. 40°21′39″N 83°45′33″W	Bellefontaine	Second Empire sandstone courthouse
7	Martin Marmon House	Martin Marmon House	February 20, 1986 (#86000322)	County Road 153 near Zanesfield; 40°19′40″N 83°40′00″W	Jefferson Township	1820 home of prominent Quaker pioneer
8	McColly Covered Bridge	McColly Covered Bridge	May 28, 1975 (#75001458)	2 miles southeast of Bloom Center on County Road 13; 40°24′03″N 83°55′27″W	Washington Township	One of two remaining covered bridges in Logan County
9	Abram S. Piatt House and Donn S. Piatt House	Abram S. Piatt House and Donn S. Piatt House	May 3, 1982 (#82003604)	Township Road 47 and State Route 245 (Mac-a-Cheek); County Road 1 and State Route 287 (Mac-o-Chee); 40°15′03″N 83°43′36″W	Monroe Township	Gothic chateaux built by two brothers; commonly known as the Piatt Castles
10	Schine's Holland Theatre	Schine's Holland Theatre	May 25, 2001 (#01000561)	125 E. Columbus St. 40°21′40″N 83°45′32″W	Bellefontaine	Dutch Revival theater

== See also ==
- List of National Historic Landmarks in Ohio
- Listings in neighboring counties: Auglaize, Champaign, Hardin, Shelby, Union
- National Register of Historic Places listings in Ohio
