= EDJ =

EDJ may refer to:

- Bellefontaine Regional Airport, in Ohio, United States
- The Emily Dickinson Journal, an academic journal
- Eric D. Johnson (born 1976), American singer-songwriter, composer and multi-instrumentalist
