= George Bartholomew (inventor) =

American inventor

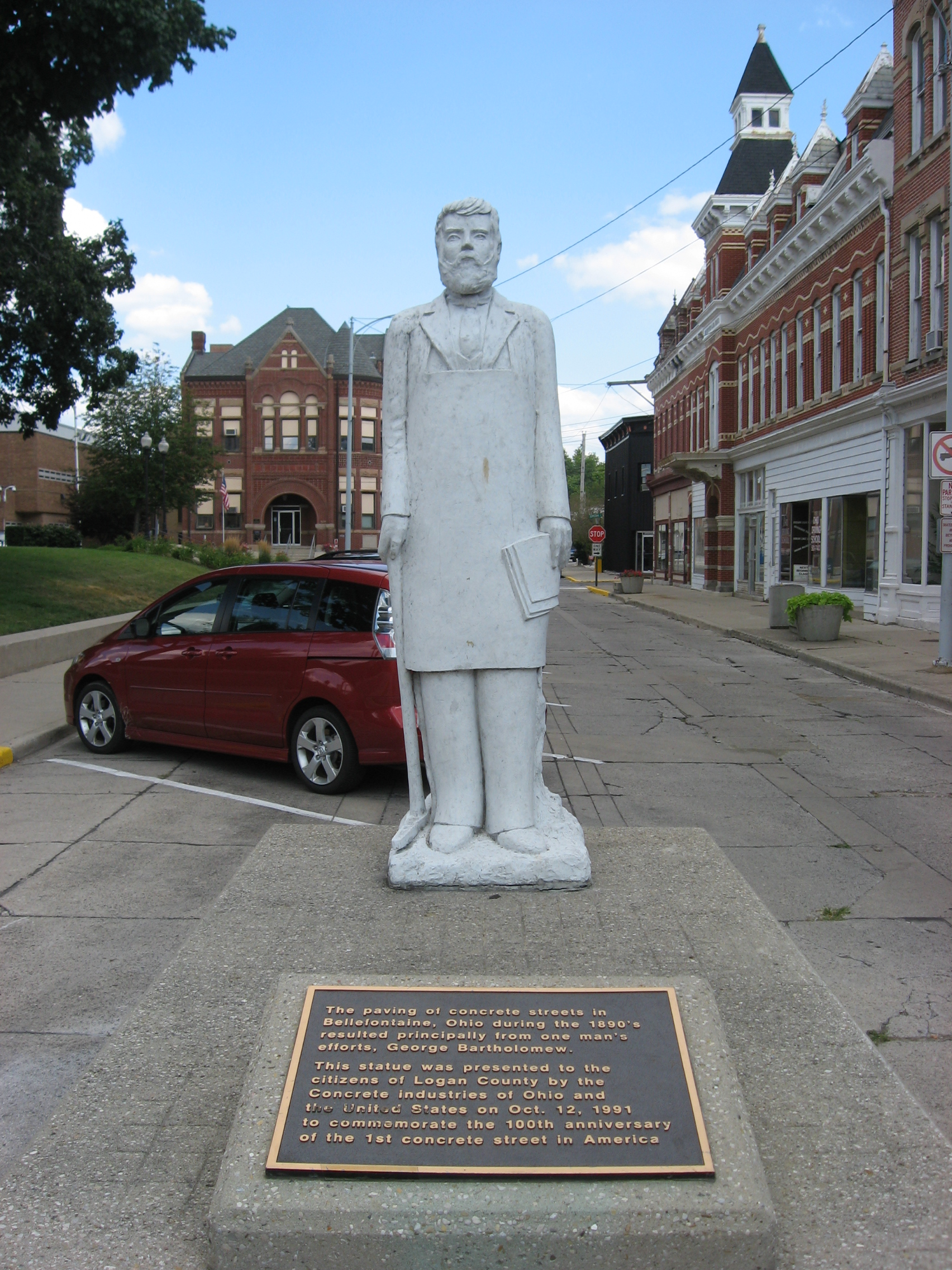
- A statue of Bartholomew erected in Bellefontaine, Ohio, in 1991
- Born: August 24, 1848; Bristol, Connecticut, U.S.
- Died: March 1, 1933 (age 84); St. Petersburg, Florida, U.S.
- Occupation(s): Inventor, manufacturer

George Wells Bartholomew Jr. (August 24, 1848 – March 1, 1933) was an American inventor who is credited with the invention of concrete pavement.

== Early life and education ==
Bartholomew was born in Bristol, Connecticut, the son of George W. Bartholomew Sr. and Angeline Ives Bartholomew. His father was a clock manufacturer. He learned about cement production in Germany and San Antonio, Texas.

== Career ==
Bartholomew owned a hardware store in Austin, Texas. In 1886, Bartholomew moved to Bellefontaine, Ohio, after having learned about cement production. Bartholomew found a good source of limestone and clay in the area; from this, he hoped to create an artificial stone for paving. Bartholomew founded the Buckeye Portland Cement Company and set about developing a new cement for pavement. His company created a town, Marl City, Ohio, now deserted.

In 1891, the Bellefontaine city council approved the use of Bartholomew's invention for paving a test strip on Main Street outside the Logan County courthouse. This experiment proved successful, and the council approved the pavement of Court Avenue.

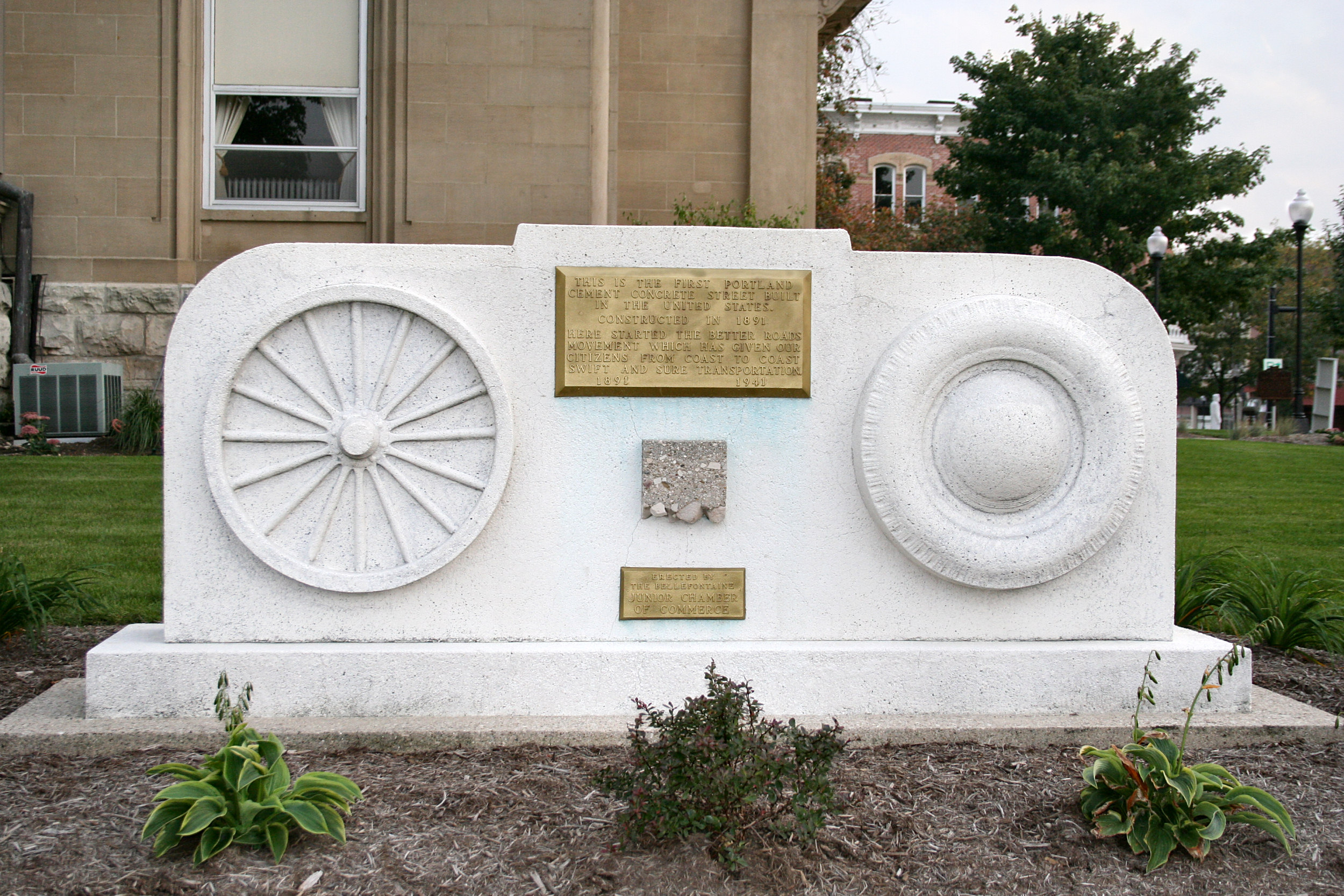
Monument to the first Portland cement street ever, Bellefontaine, Ohio.

Bartholomew was honored for his invention at the World Columbian Exposition in Chicago, Illinois in 1893. His award was titled, "First Place for Engineering Technology Advancement in Paving Materials." This award lent credibility to Bartholomew's technique, and it was quickly adopted throughout the United States and internationally.

Bartholomew moved to Colorado by 1910, where he worked for Colorado Portland Cement Company.

== Personal life and legacy ==
Barstow married Hettie Julia Cole before 1880. They had sons Linn, Tracy, and Richard, and daughter Grace and Lucy. His eldest son, Linn, died in Puerto Rico in 1918. Barstow died in 1933, in St. Petersburg, Florida, at the age of 84.

In Bellefontaine, a section of Court Avenue remains paved today with Bartholomew's formula, celebrated as the first concrete paved street in America. The street section was restored in 1962. In 1991, the city of Bellefontaine hosted a centennial celebration for Bartholomew's successful street paving. They erected a statue of Bartholomew and held a parade; Bartholomew's grandson George A. Bartholomew gave a speech to dedicate the statue.
