= Virginia Sharpe Patterson =

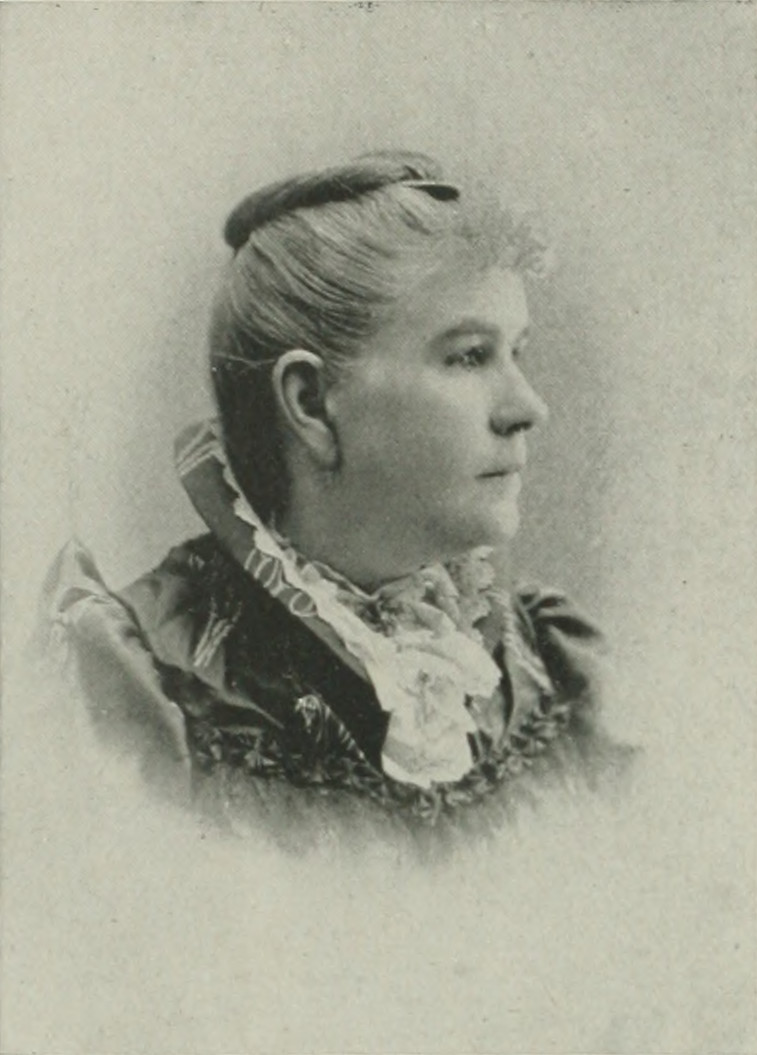
VIRGINIA SHARPE PATTERSON A woman of the century (page 570 crop)

Anne Virginia Sharpe Patterson (September 1841, Delaware, Ohio – 1913) was an American author, who also wrote under the pseudonym Garry Gaines.

Anne Virginia Sharpe was the daughter of George W. Sharpe, the youngest member of the Maryland Senate, and Caroline Snyder. Home-educated by her father until his death, she then attended the Delaware Female Seminary for three years. Upon marriage she moved to Bellefontaine, Ohio. Her first articles appeared in the Cincinnati Gazette. A series of satires, 'The Girl of the Period', originally written for the Bellefontaine Examiner, was republished under the pen-name Garry Gaines in 1878. Despite bad health from 1881 onwards, she continued an active life. In 1889, she was vice-president of the Ohio Women's Press Club. In 1890, she founded the Woman's Club of Bellefontaine, Ohio.

== Works ==
- The American girl of the period: her ways and views. Philadelphia: J. B. Lippincott, 1878
- Dickey Downy, the autobiography of a bird. Philadelphia: A. F. Rowland, 1902.
