= Campbell Hill (Ohio) =

Highest point in Ohio, United States

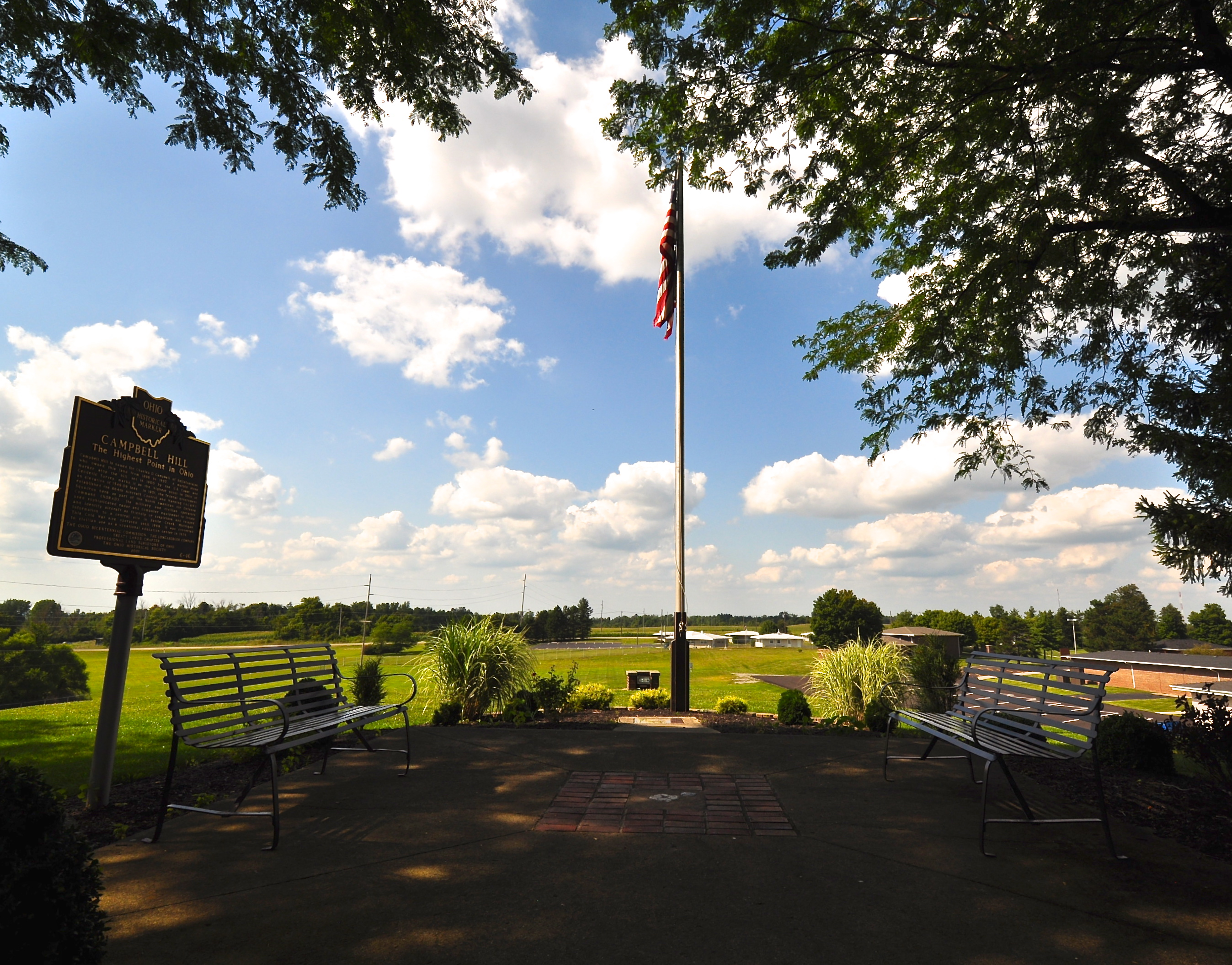
- Campbell Hill, Ohio, August 2013.

Highest point
- Elevation: 1,549.09 ft (472.16 m) NAVD 88
- Prominence: 639 ft (195 m)
- Listing: U.S. state high point 43rd
- Coordinates: 40°22′11″N 83°43′14″W

Geography
- Location within Ohio
- Location: Logan County, Ohio
- Parent range: Bellefontaine Outlier
- Topo map: USGS Zanesfield

Geology
- Mountain type: Hill

Climbing
- Easiest route: paved road

Campbell Hill is, at 1,549.09 feet (472.16 m), the highest point in elevation in the U.S. state of Ohio. Campbell Hill is located within the city of Bellefontaine, 2 miles (3.2 km) northeast of downtown.

== Description ==
The peak is the former home of the Bellefontaine Air Force Station, where the 664th Aircraft Control and Warning Squadron maintained a Cold War early warning radar. Currently, the summit is occupied by the Ohio Hi-Point Career Center and is open to visitors Monday through Friday.

Located about 50 miles northwest of Columbus, Campbell Hill is classified as a glacial moraine and has been referred to as "the most manicured of the state highpoints." Campbell Hill ranks 43rd in height on the list of highest natural points in each U.S. state.

== Climate ==
Campbell Hill's climate is classified as Humid Continental, with summers being warm and humid, and winters cold with periodic snow. Precipitation average 40 inches, falling fairly evenly across the year. Campbell Hill and much of Eastern Logan County have just enough elevation to create some minor, yet noticeable climatic differences between it and the rest of the state. The region receives a few more inches of snow each winter than the surrounding Ohio plains, and is nearly always a couple degrees cooler.

== Recreation ==
Although one can practically drive to within a few feet of the summit, high-pointers can be found visiting Campbell Hill periodically through the year. Five miles to the Southeast, Mad River Mountain operates as the only downhill skiing area in Western Ohio. Zane Shawnee Caverns is another popular attraction nearby, shaped by the same geologic processes that produced Campbell Hill. The region also forms the headwaters of the Mad River (Ohio), which is not only Ohio's largest and most popular coldwater fishery, but one of the only trout streams in the entire state.

== History ==
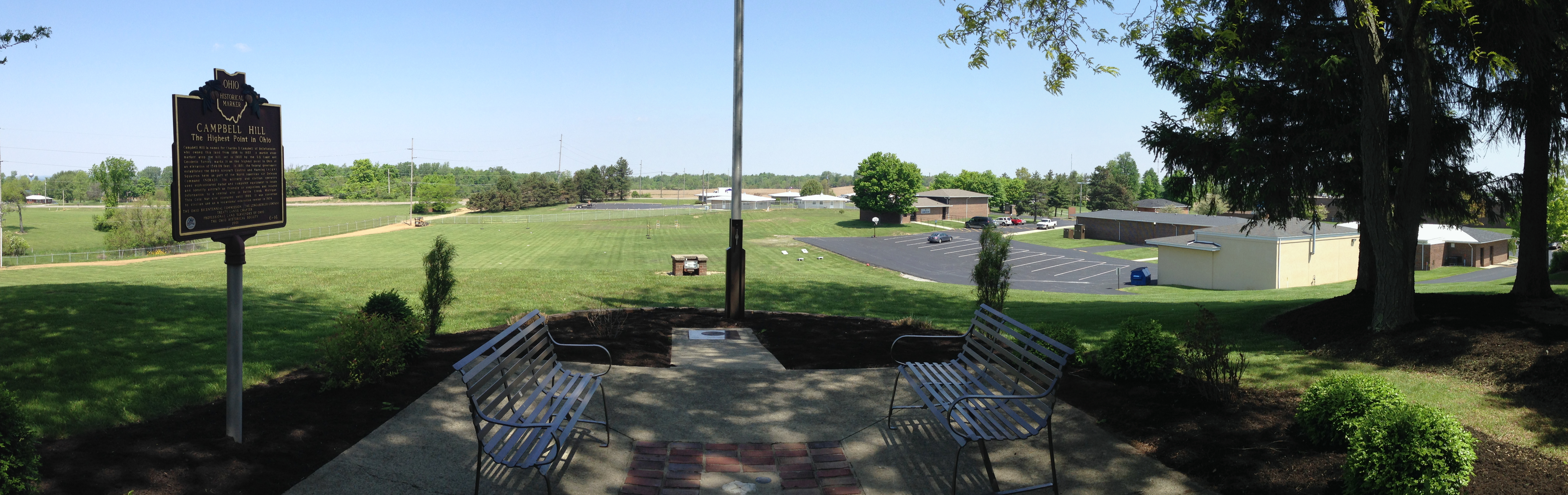
View from the summit of Campbell Hill, May 2015

The hard rock of the area resisted the glaciers that covered and flattened much of Ohio during the Ice ages. The unglaciated land south of the hill became a channel for glacial runoff and formed the Mad River. The river's limestone gorges are due to its recent formation.

To European settlers, Campbell Hill was first known as Hogue's Hill or Hoge's Hill, perhaps a misspelling of the name of the person who first deeded the land in 1830, Solomon Hoge. Solomon Lafayette Hoge was born on July 11, 1836, in nearby Pickrelltown, a short distance southeast of Bellefontaine. In 1898, the land was sold to Charles D. Campbell, in whose name Campbell Hill is now known. Campbell sold the hill and surrounding land to August Wagner, who was the original brewer of Augustiner and Gambrinus beers. (These brands are now the trademarks of the Gambrinus Company of San Antonio, Texas, though the company has stopped production of these beers.)

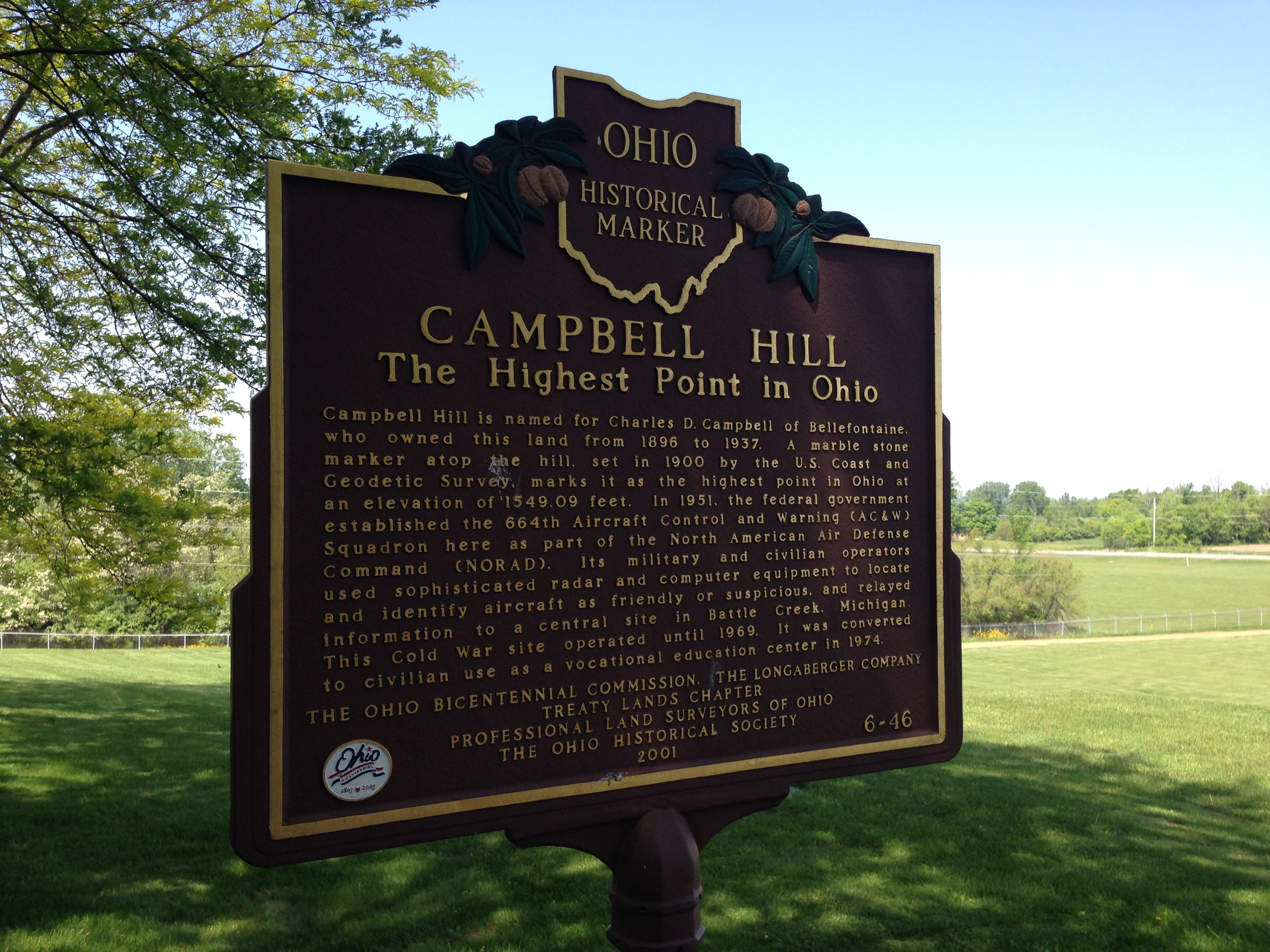
Historical Marker at the site, May 2015

In 1950, the family of August Wagner deeded Campbell Hill and the surrounding 57.5 acres (233,000 m^{2}) to the Federal government of the United States. The government then stationed the 664th Aircraft Control and Warning Squadron on the hill in 1951. The 664th AC&WS and similar military units were eventually superseded by the North American Aerospace Defense Command (or NORAD), and the base in Bellefontaine was closed in 1969.

The Ohio Hi-Point Vocational-Technical District opened a school atop the hill in 1974, now known as the Ohio Hi-Point Career Center.

A petition to rename Campbell Hill after former Alaska Governor Sarah Palin appeared on the White House's Web site in 2015; it was an attempt to satirize the Department of the Interior's decision to change the name of Alaska's Mount McKinley back to Denali that year.

== See also ==
- List of U.S. states by elevation
