= Bellefontaine Municipal Airport =

- IATA: none; ICAO: none; FAA LID: 7I7

Summary
- Airport type: Public
- Operator: City of Bellefontaine
- Location: Bellefontaine, Ohio
- Closed: 2022
- Time zone: UTC−05:00 (-5)
  - Summer (DST): UTC−04:00 (-4)
- Coordinates: 40.41°N 83.74°W

Map
- Location of airport in Ohio 7I7 (the United States)

Bellefontaine Municipal Airport (FAA LID: 7I7) was a public-use, general aviation airport north of Bellefontaine, Ohio. It opened about 1967 and was replaced by Bellefontaine Regional Airport in 2002.

== History ==
By late November 1964, the city was considering purchasing 72-acre (29 ha) of land for an airport. Three of the four properties necessary had been acquired by late December. Land clearing for the airport had begun by late February 1965, right-of-way for the construction of an access road was obtained in late March and a groundbreaking ceremony was held at the start of May. A significant amount of volunteer work, such as the delivery of gravel, was made during the construction. By September, it was announced the facility would be known as simply Bellefontaine Airport. It qualified for a $100,000 state grant in early March 1966 – the first of 56 counties to do so under a county airport program – and the money was released later that week. Contracts for paving, a 10-unit hangar and lighting were awarded in May, early September and early October 1966, respectively. The airport and its 4,400-foot (1,300 m) runway were dedicated on 23 October 1966. A chapter of the Soarheads flying club from Dayton was being planned for the airport in late January 1967. A 912-square-foot (84.7 m^{2}) terminal was in the process of being approved in mid November 1967. By February 1970, the terminal had been built and a hangar was under construction. Five months later, the hangar had also been completed, a taxiway and apron graded and runway lights installed. These improvements were dedicated in early August 1970. At the same time, the subtitle Wissler-Rausenberger Field was added to the airport's name. An airport manager was hired in early 1972.

A new airport manager took over in 1982. The airport received a state grant to repave the runway in early August 1983.

A proposal was made in January 1994 to open a skydiving school at the airport.

The airport was closed in 2022 and replaced by the Bellefontaine Regional Airport.

== Accidents and incidents ==
- On 13 August 1980, a Piper Cherokee crashed while taking off from the airport, injuring the pilot.
