= Logan County Courthouse (Ohio) =

Local government building in the United States

- U.S. National Register of Historic Places
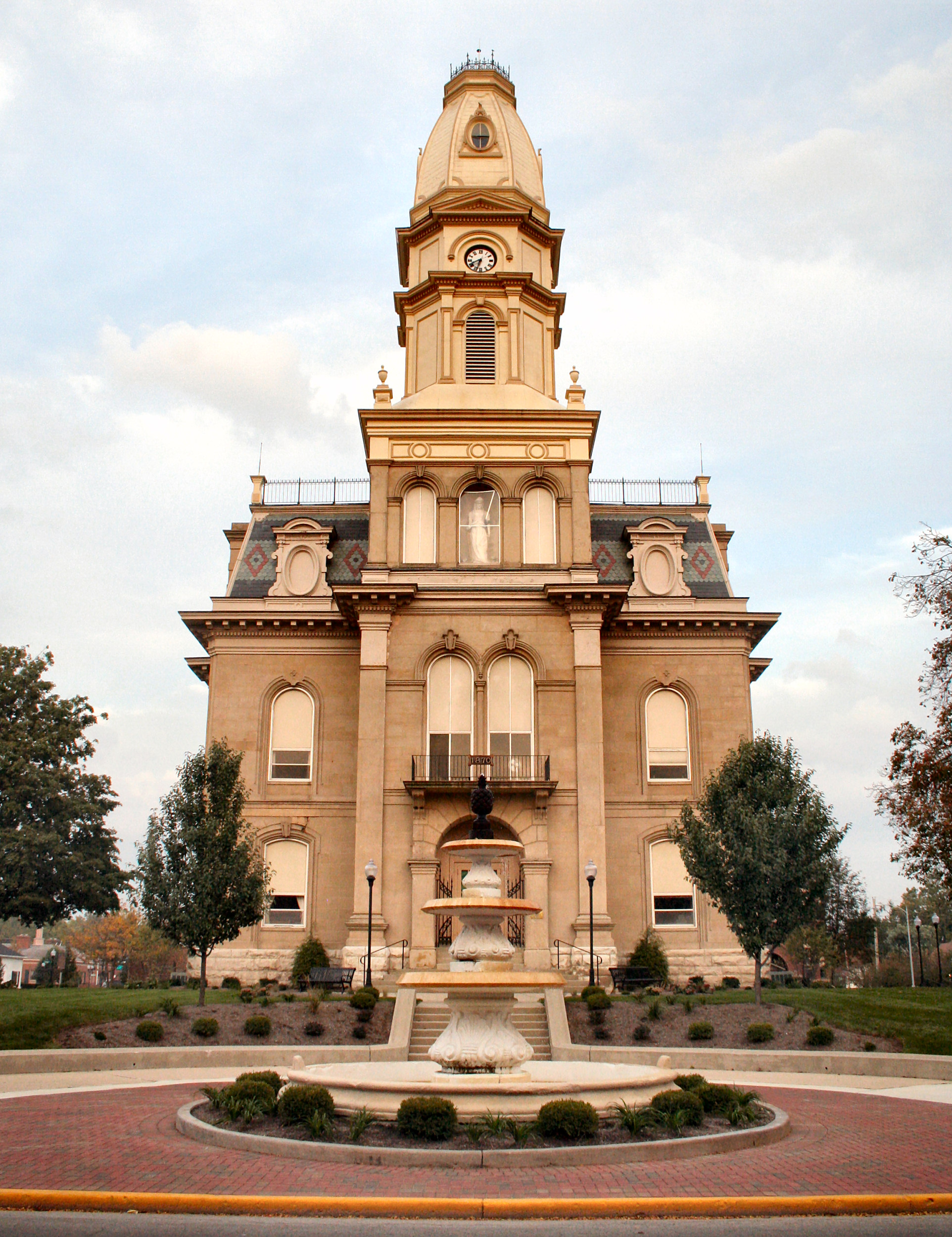
- Logan County Courthouse from the front

- Location within Ohio Location within the United States
- Interactive map showing the location of Logan County Courthouse
- Location: 101 South Main Street, Bellefontaine, Ohio, United States
- Coordinates: 40°21′38″N 83°45′33″W
- Area: 1.5 acres (0.61 ha)
- Built: 1870
- Architect: Alexander Koehler
- Architectural style: Second Empire
- NRHP reference No.: 73001497
- Added to NRHP: June 4, 1973

The Logan County Courthouse is a historic Second Empire building located on the southeastern corner of Main Street and Columbus Avenue in downtown Bellefontaine, Ohio, United States. Built in 1870 at a cost of $105,398.08, the courthouse was constructed primarily of locally mined sandstone, and it is covered with a mansard roof. The courthouse is adjacent to Court Avenue, the first concrete street in the United States.

On June 4, 1973, it was added to the National Register of Historic Places.
