= Holland Theater =

- Schine's Holland Theatre
- U.S. National Register of Historic Places
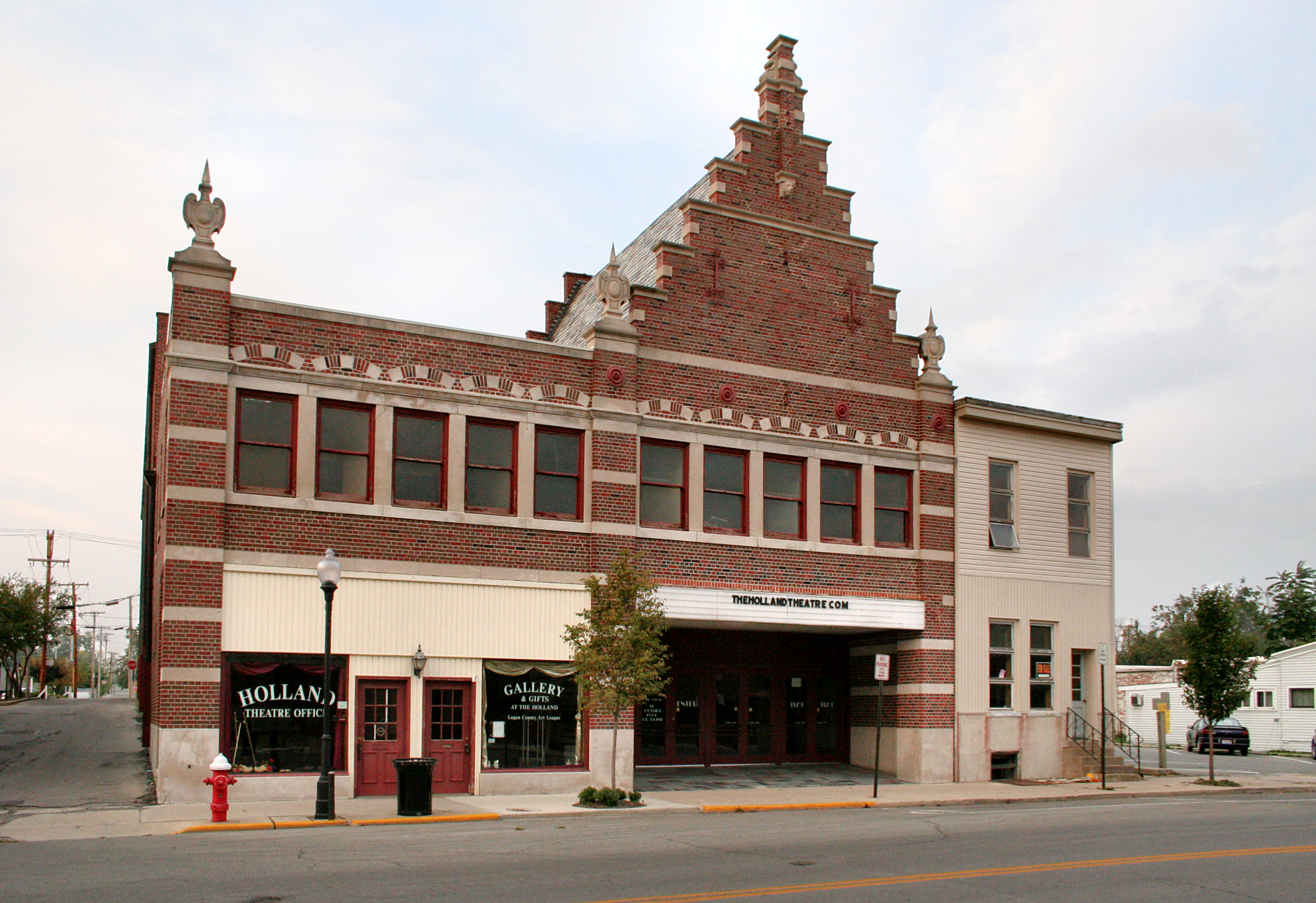
- The Holland from Columbus Ave.

- Location within Ohio Location within the United States
- Location: 125 E. Columbus Ave., Bellefontaine, Ohio
- Coordinates: 40°21′40″N 83°45′32″W
- Area: less than one acre
- Built: 1931
- Architect: Peter M. Hulsken; Hoseler Bros.
- Architectural style: Dutch Revival
- NRHP reference No.: 01000561
- Added to NRHP: May 25, 2001

Holland Theatre opened as a vaudeville and movie palace on February 12, 1931 in Bellefontaine, Ohio, United States. Like many historic theaters, the Holland ultimately went out of business after a newer, more technologically advanced, multi-screen cinema was introduced to the town. However, after several renovations to the Holland Theater, it is now fully operational as a performing arts venue for stage performances, and feature films as of 2019.

== History ==
Built in 1931, the Holland Theatre was built, owned and operated by Schine Curcuit Theatres. This chain owned 185 theaters in six states (Delaware, Kentucky, Maryland, New York, Ohio, and Pennsylvania). It was designed by actitect Peter Hulsken, a Dutch immigrant to Lima, Ohio. Construction was completed by the Hossler Brothers of Tiffin, Ohio for the cost of $150,000.

The exterior has a Flemish-style stepped-gable facade and uses Dutch cross bond brick. In the interior, the lobby has a beamed ceiling, slate floors, and rough walls. The auditorium contains a 17th-century Dutch landscape that line both interior sidewalls of the theater including windmills that slowly turn, modeled after his hometown of Arnhem, Netherlands. It is the only atmospheric theater in the United States built in a primarily Dutch style of architecture.

The Holland originally had the capability for both cinema and stage plays but was eventually converted to a 5 screen multiplex, with the "main" screen remaining in the auditorium in front of the stage after it was sold in 1977. The theater's balcony was split in half and converted into two screens, and two additional screens were constructed in the rear of the cinema where the stage previously existed.

In 1998, the multiplex closed and a 6th grade class made the theatre its class project to raise awareness. Richard Knowlton, a Bellefontaine businessman bought it, later donating the theatre to the Logan County Landmark Preservation. As the preservation group worked to restore the building, various fine arts events continued to be hosted. In 2010, the theater received a grant from the Ohio Cultural Facilities Commission; the theater board has installed a new lighting system with the grant money. More grant money was acquired in 2015 and 2019. The renovations were completed in October 2019 with singer Judy Collins opening.
