= Bellefontaine Regional Airport =

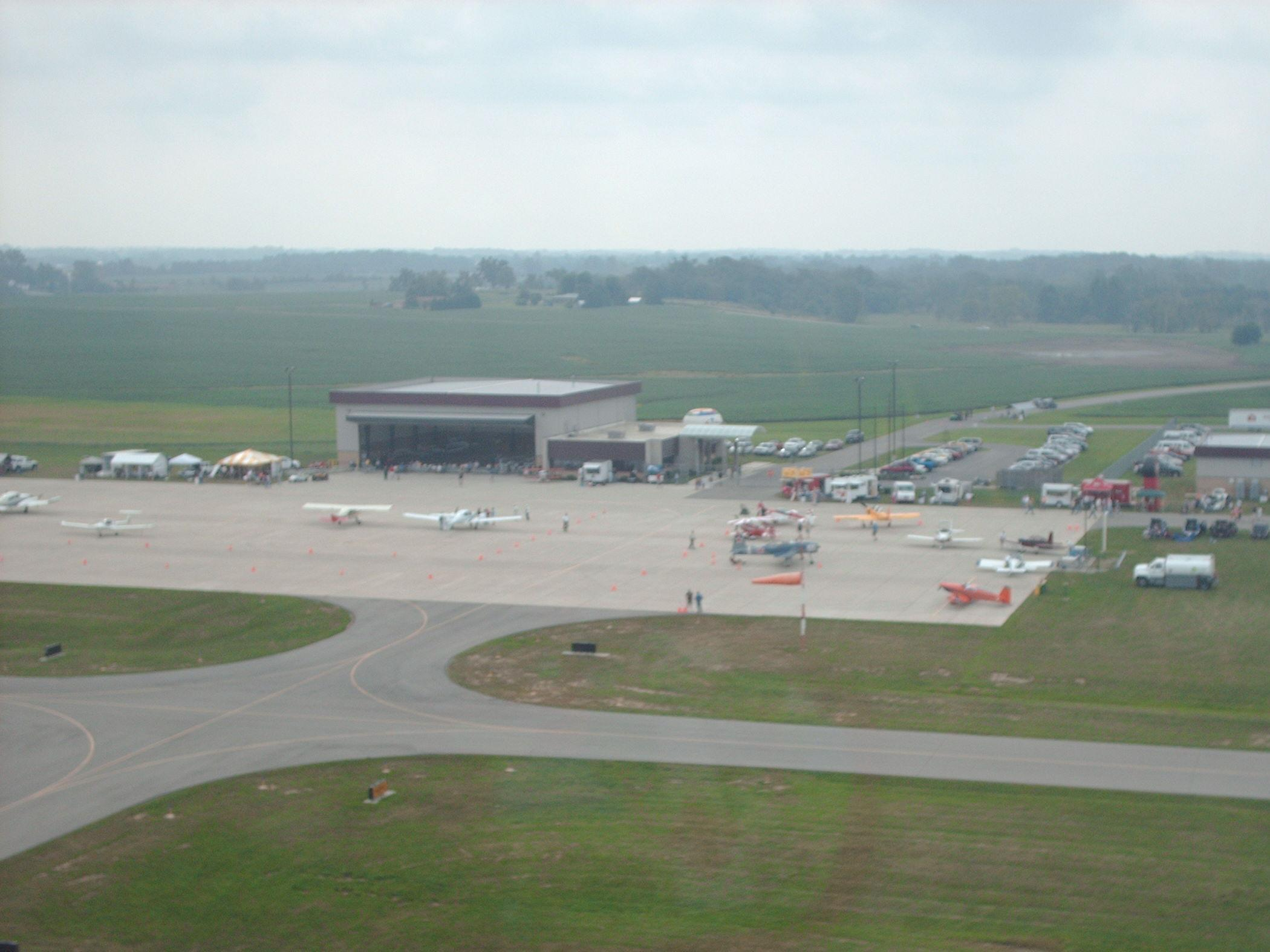
- IATA: none; ICAO: KEDJ; FAA LID: EDJ

Summary
- Airport type: Public
- Owner: City of Bellefontaine
- Location: Bellefontaine, Ohio
- Time zone: UTC−05:00 (-5)
  - Summer (DST): UTC−04:00 (-4)
- Elevation AMSL: 1,123 ft (342 m)
- Coordinates: 40°22′20″N 083°49′08″W
- Website: https://www.ci.bellefontaine.oh.us/airport.html

Map
- Location of airport in Ohio EDJ (the United States)

Runways
Direction	Length		Surface
Direction	ft	m	Surface
7/25	5,000	1,524	Asphalt

Statistics (2021)
- Aircraft operations: 8,395
- Based aircraft: 28
- Source: Federal Aviation Administration

Bellefontaine Regional Airport (ICAO: KEDJ, FAA LID: EDJ) is a publicly owned, public use airport located three miles west of Bellefontaine, in Logan County, Ohio. It is a general aviation airport operated by Midwest Corporate Air under the auspices of the City of Bellefontaine and is accessible from State Route 47.

Most U.S. airports use the same three-letter location identifier for the FAA and IATA; however, Bellefontaine Regional Airport is EDJ to the FAA and has no IATA code.

For the last several years, Bellefontaine Regional has hosted an annual "Airfest" in late summer.

== History ==
As early as November 1992, consideration was being given to replacing Bellefontaine Municipal Airport. Its site was surrounded by features that prevented its expansion and the airport manager, Michael Duff, promoted moving it to a new location. The month following his death in January 1998, the environmental assessment for a new location was completed. A ballot issue that November asked citizens whether the city should sell land it had purchased for the airport two months before. A groundbreaking was due to be held on 31 July 2000. The airport opened on 8 August 2002. According to the Aircraft Owners and Pilots Association, the current Bellefontaine Regional was, at its dedication on August 16th, only the second new airport to open in Ohio in the last 30 years.

In 2021, the airport received a $32,000 grant from the Federal Aviation Administration to fund operations, personnel, cleaning, sanitization, janitorial services, debt service payments, and funds to combat the spread of pathogens at the airport. The money was aimed to help the airport recover from the COVID-19 pandemic.

== Facilities ==
The airport covers 300 acres (120 ha) and has one asphalt runway (7/25) 4,999 x 100 ft (1,524 x 30 m) long.

The airport has fuel available. Planes can use tiedowns or hangars for parking.

In the year ending September 3, 2021 the airport had 8,395 aircraft operations, average 23 per day: 89% general aviation and 11% air taxi. For the same time period, 28 aircraft were based at the airport: 22 single-engine and 5 multi-engine airplanes as well as 1 jet.

The airport's fixed-base operator, Midwest Corporate Air, also runs a flight school.

== Accidents and incidents ==
- On August 17, 2021, a Diamond DA42 Twin Star crashed after takeoff from the Bellefontaine Regional Airport when both of its engines lost power. The two pilots were able to stabilize the aircraft and brought it to a landing at the edge of airport property. Neither the flight instructor nor the student pilot on board were injured. The aircraft was on its first flight since time-limited engine fuel feed pumps had been replaced on both engines; no maintenance check flight was completed after the replacements because none was required. After the accident, examination of the right engine revealed that the right engine fuel feed pump bolt was not seated and thus might have resulted in inadequate fuel pressure for proper engine operation. The cause of the left engine's power loss could not be determined. The probable cause of the accident was found to be the improper position of the right engine's fuel feed pump bolt, which led to a total loss of power on the right engine, and the left engine's partial loss of engine power for reasons that could not be determined based on the available evidence.
- On February 26, 2022, a Diamond DA42 Twin Star was substantially damaged on landing at the Bellefontaine Regional Airport. The aircraft's nose wheel collapsed during the landing sequence, causing the aircraft to veer off the runway and strike a taxiway light.
- On May 7, 2025, a 2007 Diamond DA42 twin engine aircraft was in the process of taking off when the co-pilot inadvertently retracted the landing gear, causing the gear to hit the runway, according to the Ohio State Highway Patrol.

== See also ==
- List of airports in Ohio
