= Court Avenue =

- First Concrete Street In U.S.
- U.S. National Register of Historic Places
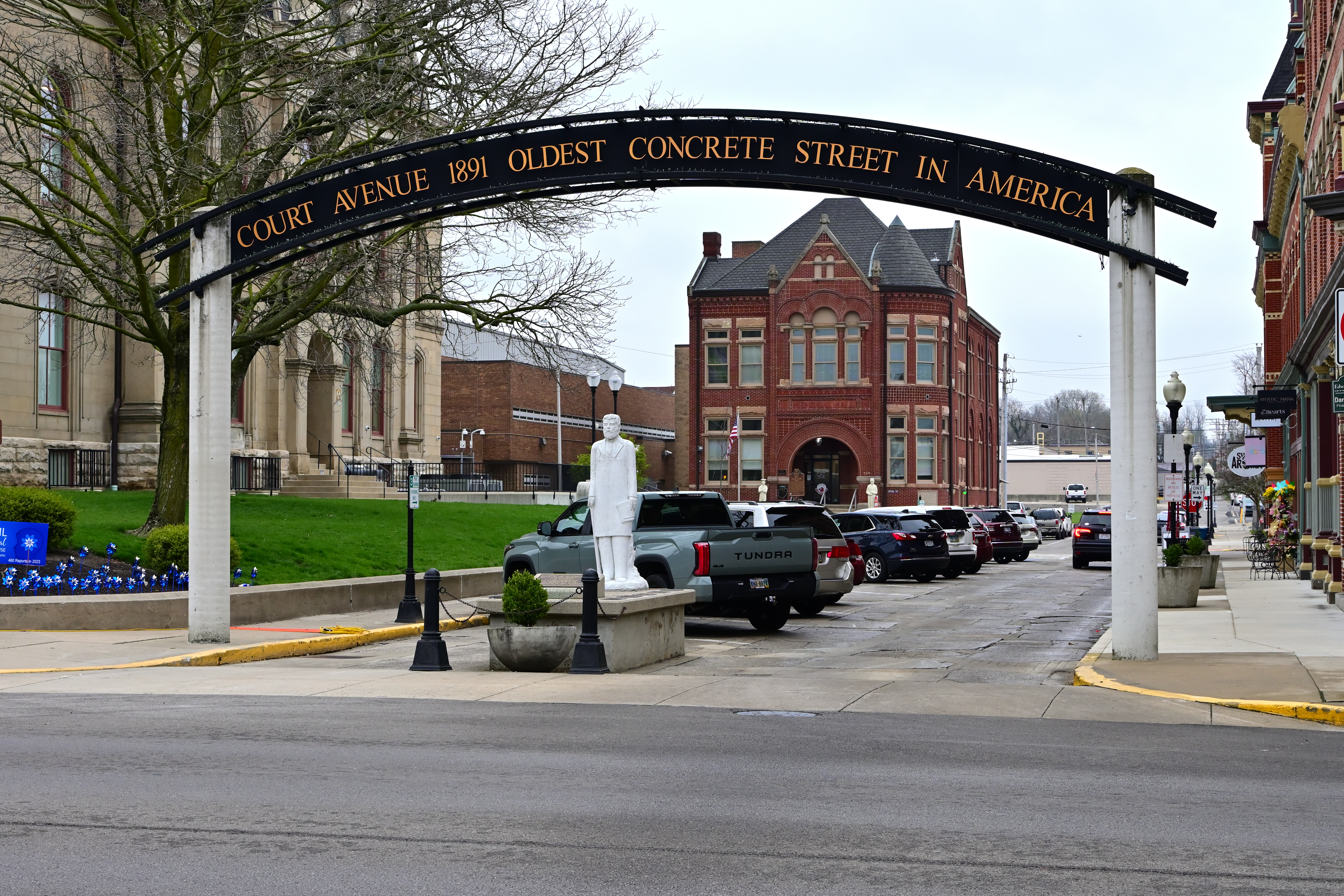
- West entrance to Court Avenue

- Location within Ohio Location within the United States
- Location: Bellefontaine, Ohio, United States
- Coordinates: 40°21′38″N 83°45′33″W
- Area: Less than one acre
- Built: 1893
- Architect: George Bartholomew
- NRHP reference No.: 74001547
- Added to NRHP: February 25, 1974

Court Avenue is a small street in downtown Bellefontaine, Ohio, United States, located adjacent to the Logan County Courthouse. First paved in 1893, it is known for being the first street in the United States to be paved with concrete.

== Early history ==
Court Avenue, like Bellefontaine's other streets, was originally a dirt road that could easily become dusty or muddy in bad weather. In 1886, concrete pioneer George Bartholomew moved to Logan County, where he found high-quality raw materials used for concrete production. By 1891, he had hopes of using concrete for street pavement, so he gained the Bellefontaine city council's permission to pave a few square feet of the nearby Main Street as a test patch. Although some feared that concrete pavement would quickly be damaged or destroyed, the pavement endured, and in 1893, the council permitted the pavement of all the streets surrounding the courthouse, including Court Avenue. While Bartholomew provided the materials, the actual process of laying the concrete was led by James Wonders, the county engineer. The council was not initially enthusiastic about the proposal, nevertheless; having found no previous examples of such paving methods, it required Bartholomew to donate the cement and to pay a $5,000 bond to ensure that the pavement would last for five years. These fears also led authorities to have the concrete covered in sawdust in cold weather.

== Intermediate history ==
Although Bartholomew paved all four streets surrounding the courthouse, Main and Opera Streets and Columbus Avenue have since been paved over with asphalt due to damage from a broken water main in the 1950s. Consequently, Court Avenue has become a center of historical interest and preservation efforts as the only remaining example of Bartholomew's original pavement. Various anniversaries have seen celebrations and reconstructions, including the placement of a large concrete memorial on the courthouse grounds on the 50th anniversary, rededication on the 70th anniversary, and recognition with a historical marker on the 75th anniversary. Bartholomew's concrete was strong enough to see little damage for its first several decades, requiring the expense of only $1,400 for maintenance in its first fifty years, although it required reconstruction in the 1960s. On February 25, 1974, the street was added to the National Register of Historic Places. Court Avenue was designated as a National Historic Civil Engineering Landmark by the American Society of Civil Engineers in 1976.

== Recent history ==
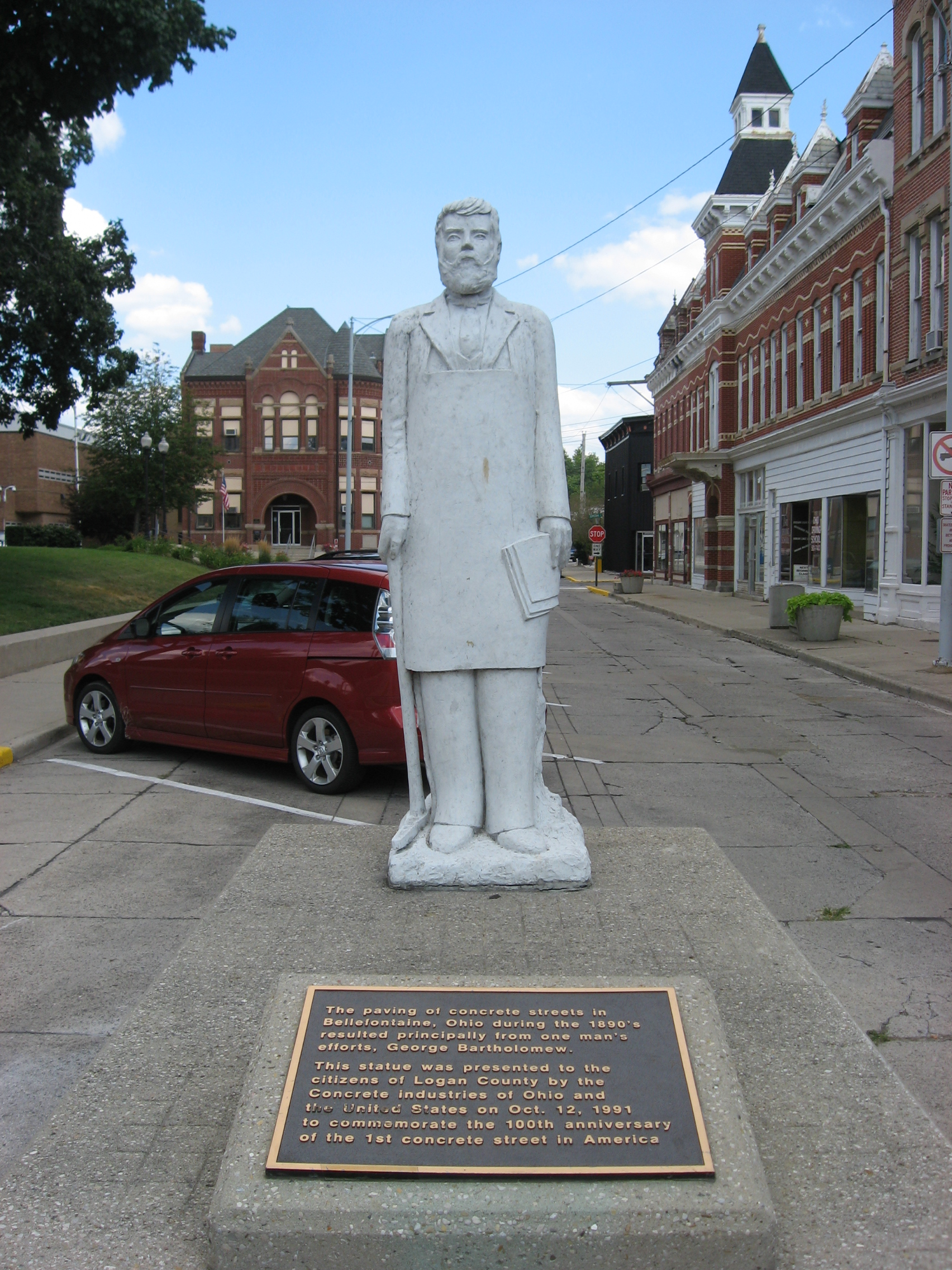
Monument of George Bartholomew on Court Avenue.

In recent years, Court Avenue has been the center of various historic preservation efforts. The street was the focus of a centenary celebration in 1991: a monument of Bartholomew was placed at the western end of the street, both to honor the pioneer and to close the street to motor vehicles, and the street was turned into a pedestrian mall. However, few people (except for skateboarders) used the street, and its impact on the downtown traffic flow led to its reopening several years later. The monument to Bartholomew remains, but has been moved to ensure that only the eastbound lane is usable. Today, the Logan County Historical Society and others hope to see the street restored to its car-free state, although downtown businesses and many other local residents want it to stay open for traffic.

== Composition and structure ==
The pavement as originally laid was composed of two levels of concrete made in a method similar to that used to pave sidewalks. Aside from Bartholomew's cement, made from clay and limestone, the concrete included aggregate of no larger than ½ and 1½ inches (top and bottom layers respectively), with water-cement ratios of 0.45 and 0.60 (top and bottom), laid on a 4-inch (100 mm)-deep base. Mixed by hand, the concrete has an air mixture of about 8% and a total strength of about 34.5 megapascals, or slightly over 5,000 psi. The total cost of paving the street was approximately $9,000, aside from the bond. Restorations performed on the pavement since the original construction have proven less resilient; most patches in poor condition are those that have been restored, with Bartholomew's remaining segments withstanding damage more satisfactorily.
