= Stanisław Wyspiański =

Polish playwright, painter and poet (1869–1907)

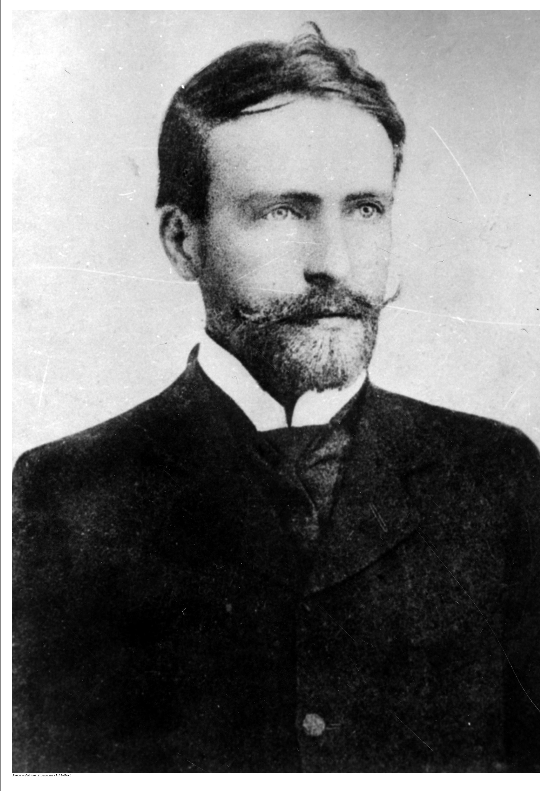
- Born: Stanisław Mateusz Ignacy Wyspiański; 15 January 1869; Kraków, Galicia, Austria-Hungary
- Died: 28 November 1907 (aged 38); Kraków
- Education: School of Fine Arts, Kraków
- Known for: Architecture, drawing, furniture, painting
- Movement: Art Nouveau, symbolism
- Spouse: Teodora Teofila Wyspiańska
- Children: 4

Stanisław Mateusz Ignacy Wyspiański (pronounced ['staˈɲiswaf vɨˈspjaɲskʲi]; 15 January 1869 – 28 November 1907) was a Polish playwright, painter, poet, and interior and furniture designer. A patriotic writer, he created symbolic national dramas accordant with the artistic premises of the Young Poland movement.

Wyspiański was one of the most outstanding and multifaceted artists in Poland under the foreign partitions. He combined modernism with traditional Polish folk and Romantic themes. He became known unofficially as a fourth Polish bard, after the earlier Three Bards: Adam Mickiewicz, Juliusz Słowacki, and Zygmunt Krasiński).

== Biography ==
Stanisław Wyspiański was born to Franciszek Wyspiański and Maria Rogowska. His father, a sculptor, owned an atelier at the foot of Wawel Hill, in the Długosz House. His mother died of tuberculosis in 1876 when Stanisław was seven years old. Due to problems with alcohol, Stanisław's father could not fulfil his parental responsibilities. Stanisław was adopted by his aunt Joanna Stankiewiczowa and her husband Kazimierz. The Stankiewicz family belonged to the bourgeois intellectual class. In their house, Wyspiański became acquainted with painter Jan Matejko, who was a frequent visitor. Matejko soon recognized that the boy had artistic talent and gave him his first artistic guidance. Wyspiański attended Saint Anne's secondary school. The school was unique for several reasons. First, although the Polish language was forbidden in educational institutions under foreign rule, the lectures at Saint Anne's were delivered in Polish. Second, the teacher's goal was to equip the students with a thorough knowledge of Polish history and literature. Third, graduates of the school, including Lucjan Rydel, Stanisław Estreicher and Henryk Opieński, were considered prominent figures in Kraków's cultural life. As a student, Wyspiański took particular interest in art and literature. According to Joanna Stankiewiczowa, the young Stanisław portrayed small cottages, animals, plants, armors and decorations. Wyspiański also created a dramatic interpretation of Matejko's painting Stefan Batory pod Pskowem (Bathory at Pskov).

In 1887 Wyspiański enrolled in the Faculty of Philosophy at Jagiellonian University and the School of Fine Arts in Kraków. While studying at the university, he attended lectures in art, history and literature. Jan Matejko, the dean of the School of Fine Arts, soon recognized Wyspiański's talent and asked him to join in the creation of a polychrome inside the Mariacki Church.

The years 1890–1895 were devoted to travel. Wyspiański visited Italy, Switzerland, Germany, Prague and France. His stay in France is regarded as a major point in his artistic life. He studied at the private Académie Colarossi. Since the school fee was very high, Wyspiański applied for a grant. During his stay in France he got acquainted with Paul Gauguin. Together they visited art museums, where Wyspiański was bewitched by the beauty of Pierre Puvis de Chavannes's paintings. He also attended theatre performances based on Shakespeare and classical era plays. His future dramas Daniel i Meleager (Daniel and Meleagra) and Powrót Odysa (Return of Odysseus) were based on the antique tradition. Meanwhile, he worked on several dramas, Królowa Polskiej Korony (The Queen of Polish Crown), Warszawianka (Varsovian Anthem) and the first version of Legenda (Legend). The play Legenda (Legend) was based on the famous Polish legend of Wars and Sawa. In August 1894 he returned to Kraków, where he got involved in the modernist movement. It was then he designed and partially made a polychrome for the Franciscan Church that was composed of flowery, geometrical and heraldic motifs. Moreover, the prior of the church encouraged Wyspiański to design various stained glass windows, such as Blessed Salomea, Saint Francis Stigmata and God the Father. Wyspiański received an award from the Polish Academy of Learning for the landscape of the Kopiec Kościuszki (Kościuszko Mound). As a painter, interior designer and poet he cooperated with the Municipal Theatre in Kraków. First he designed furniture and scenography for the theatre performances, then he staged various dramas on the stage of the theatre.

He cooperated with the Kraków Society of Friends of Fine Art and in mid-1898 was named art manager of the weekly Życie (Life). Unfortunately, his first published dramas, Legenda (Legend), (1897) and Daniel i Meleager (Daniel and Meleagra) (1898), did not receive the acclaim of the critics. It was the Warszawianka (Varsovian Anthem) that brought instantaneous acclaim to its author. The premiere of the drama marked his debut as a playwright of national dramas. The theatre premiere of the drama on 2 July 1901 starred Helena Modrzejewska as Maria. The years 1899–1900 marked the publication of Protesilas i Laodamia (Protesilas and Laodamia), Lelewel (Lelevel) and Legion. This drama is regarded to be the author's polemic displaying a romantic vision of history. In 1900, Wyspiański married the mother of his four children, Teodora Pytko. In November the same year he participated in the wedding of his friend Lucjan Rydel in Bronowice, a village near Kraków. The wedding party was the inspiration for his widely acclaimed play Wesele (The Wedding). It is a deeply critical yet sarcastic exposé of Polish society of the 19th century. "Wesele" transformed Wyspianski from a moderately successful visual and verbal artist associated with the Young Poland movement into a national dramatist-visionary whose significance in Poland is comparable to Yeats's in Ireland, O'Neill's in America, or Maeterlinck's in Belgium." The drama made references to the contemporary situation in Poland and depicted a powerless society. Although censorship barred the sale of copies of Wesele (The Wedding), the play was staged in the theatre.

After the success of Wesele (The Wedding) four new plays based on Polish history were published: Wyzwolenie (Liberation), Achilles, Bolesław Śmiały (Boleslaus The Bold) and Legenda II (Legend 2). The following years were devoted to publishing of Skałka and Powrót Odysa (Return of Odysseus); meanwhile Wyspiański translated Corneillea's Cyd (Le Cid) and Voltaire's Zaïre.

In 1906 Wyspiański became a professor at the Academy of Fine Arts in Kraków. He was also a member of the city council. In his last years, Wyspianski's health deteriorated. As a result, he underwent medical treatments in Rymanów and Bad Hall and then settled in his small cottage in the village of Węgrzce. He died of syphilis, which was incurable at the time. His funeral took place in Kraków and became a national day of mourning. Wyspiański was buried in the Crypt of the Distinguished in the Skałka Church.

== Creative output ==
Wyspiański's artistic output is very eclectic. Among dramas and poetry, there are views of Cracow (drawings, sketch-books, oil-paintings, pastel drawings), portraits and self-portraits, designs of stained glass windows and paintings, illustrations, graphic art, and designs for furniture and interiors, and development of Wawel.

Drawings, such as his 1890 self-portrait, and drafts from his journeys across Europe and Poland, are among Wyspiański's better-known works. He later created a herbarium by drawing plants. However, he most frequently used soft pastel techniques; his first pastel drawings were produced between 1890 and 1894. They mainly present the artist's family, friends and other artists. Wyspiański eagerly drew his children in everyday situations such as sleeping or feeding, including Helenka (1900), pastel drawing, owned by the National Museum in Kraków; Śpiący Staś (Sleeping Staś) (1902), pastel drawing, Silesian Museum in Katowice; Śpiący Mietek (Sleeping Mietek) (1904), pastel drawing, Museum of Art in Łódź; Macierzyństwo (Motherhood) (1905), pastel drawing, National Museum in Kraków; and Żona artysty z synkiem Stasiem (The Artist's Wife with Their Son Staś) (1904), pastel drawing, now at the Upper Silesian Museum in Bytom.

Using this technique, he painted many of his acquaintances and artists, among others Kazimierz Lewandowski, Jacek Malczewski, Eliza Pareńska, the Kryształowicz family, Ludwik Solski, Irena Solska, and Jan Stanisławski. He painted landscapes of Kraków – the Kraków Planty Park with desmans (also painted in oil), the Vistula Rudawa River, cottages in Grębowo, and at the end of his life, views from his studio to the Kościuszko Mound. He also created a poster for Maeterlinck's Wnętrze (Interior).

Part of his output constitutes various designs – mainly stained glass windows, polychromes and interiors. Stanisław Wyspiański and Józef Mehoffer designed 36 stained glass windows together for the Mariacki Church in Kraków to help Matejko with the church conservation he had been involved with since 1889. During their stay in Paris they both made two boxes for the competition of the Rudolfinum Hall Decoration Design in Prague and curtain designs for the Juliusz Słowacki Theatre in Kraków. However, Wyspiański himself designed stained glass windows and polychromes for the Franciscan Church in Kraków (with the famous stained glass window Stań się), stained glass windows depicting Saint Stanislaus, Kazimierz the Great and Henryk Pobożny for Wawel Cathedral (not executed until 2005–2007 in the Wyspiański 2000 Pavilion), the design of a showroom of the Fine Arts Society (1904), and stairs and hall decoration for the Medical Society. In 1905 Wyspiański and Władysław Ekielski designed a scheme for redevelopment of the Wawel Hill (the so-called Acropolis).

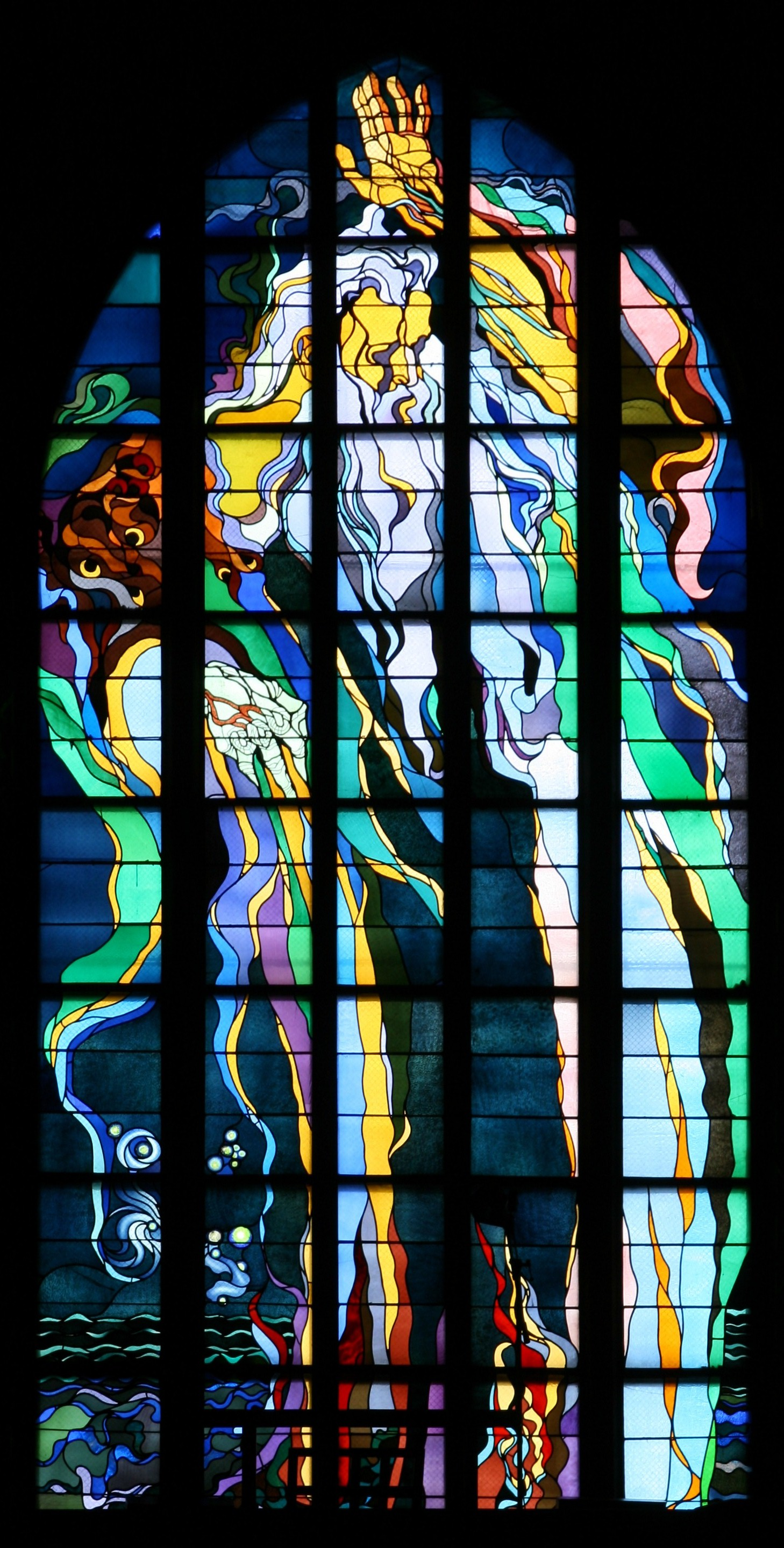
Stained-glass window designed by Stanisław Wyspiański, Church of St. Francis of Assisi in Kraków

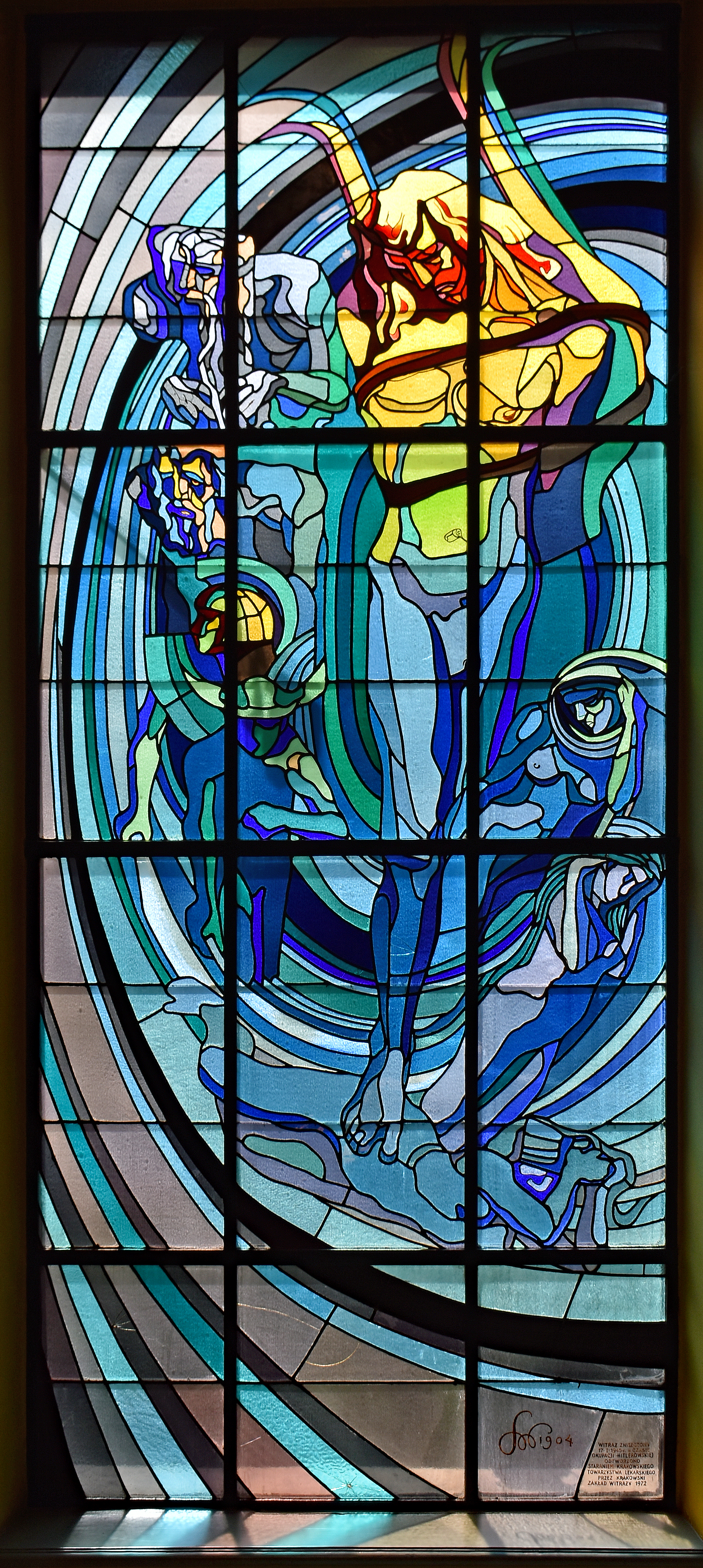
Stained glass: Apollo (System Copernicus), 1904, Medical Society in Kraków, 4 Radziwillowska street

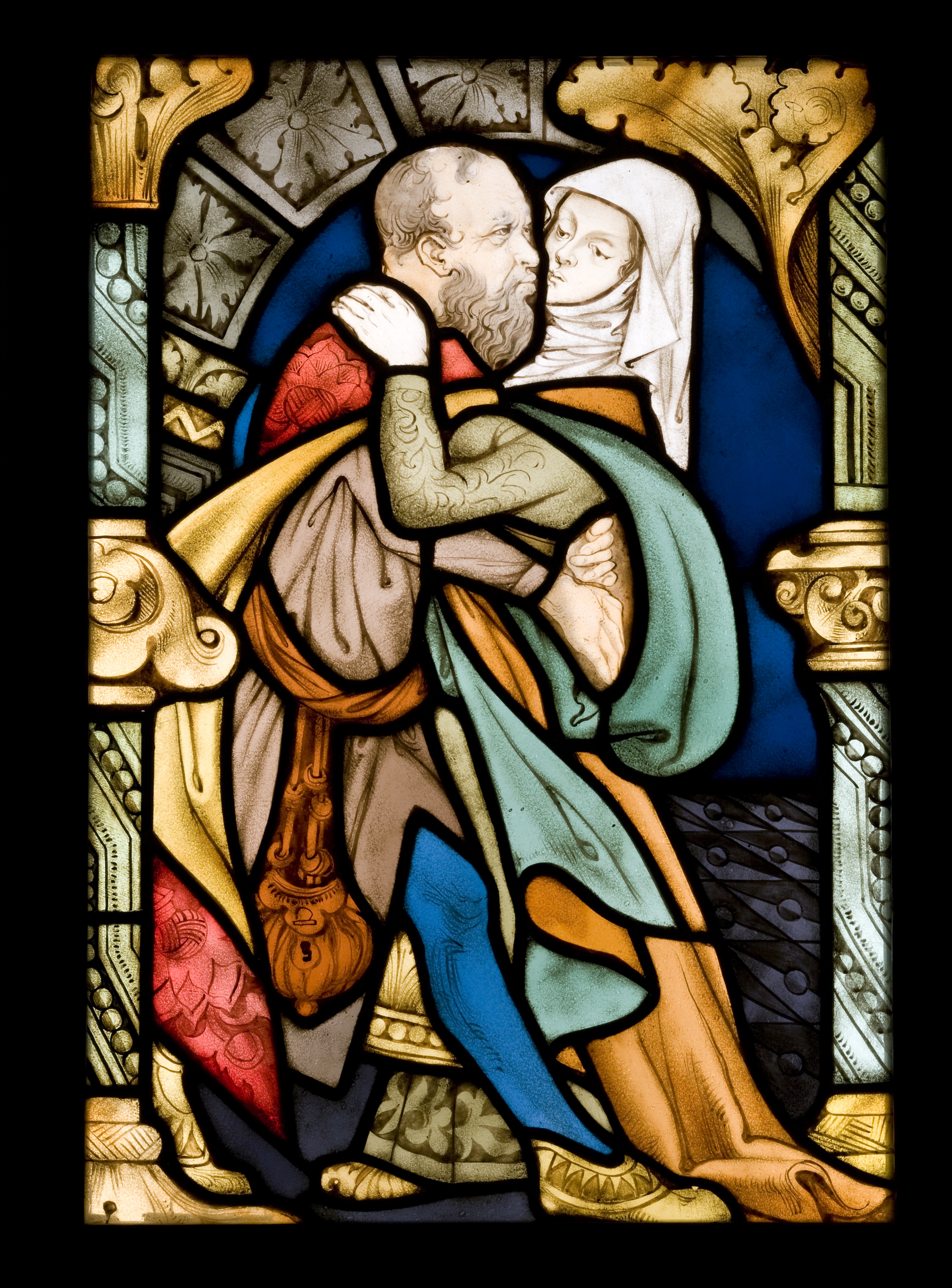
Stained glass: Meeting at the Golden Gate, 1902-1906, National Museum in Kraków

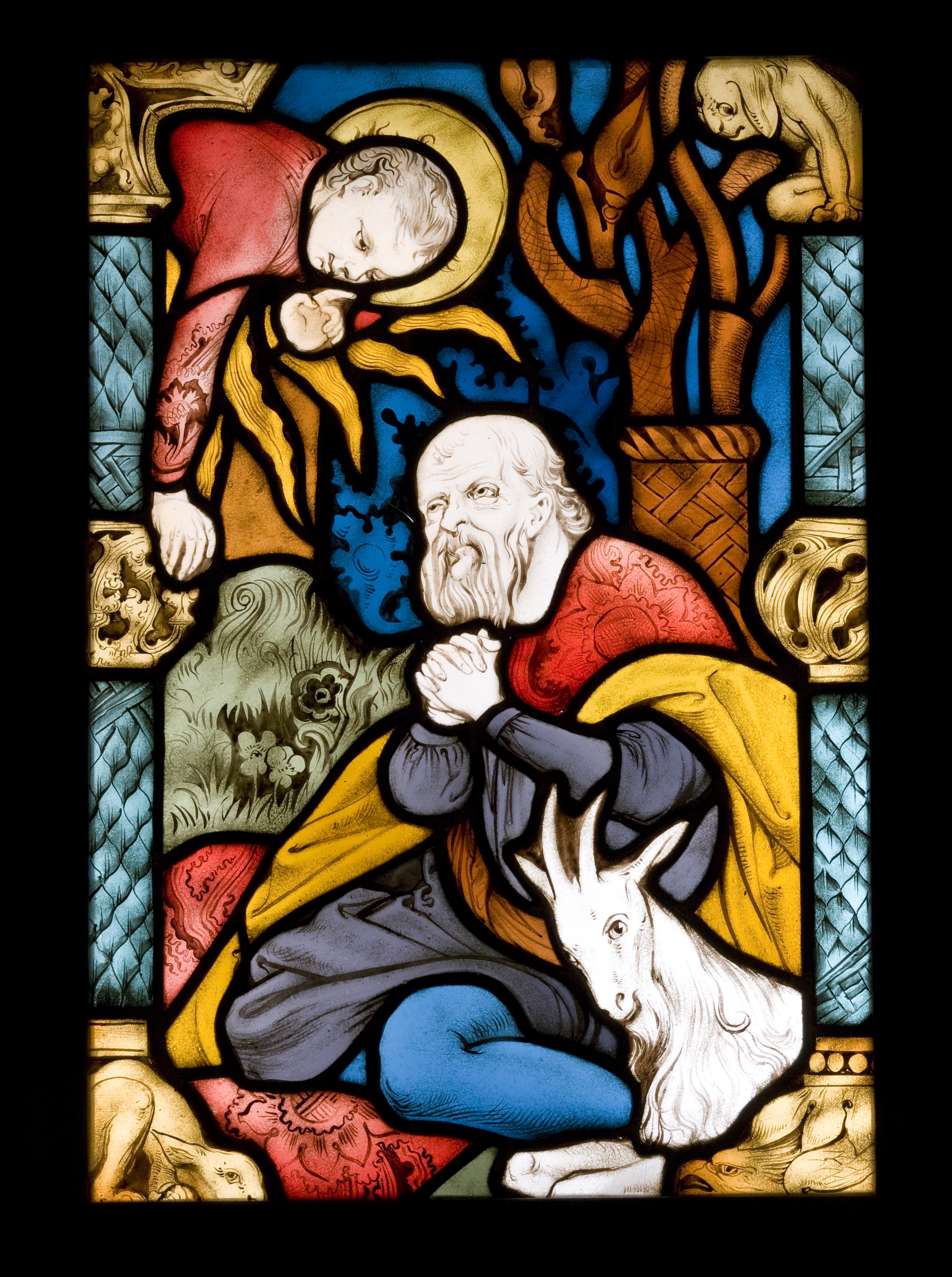
Stained glass: Annunciation to Joachim, 1902-1906, National Museum in Kraków

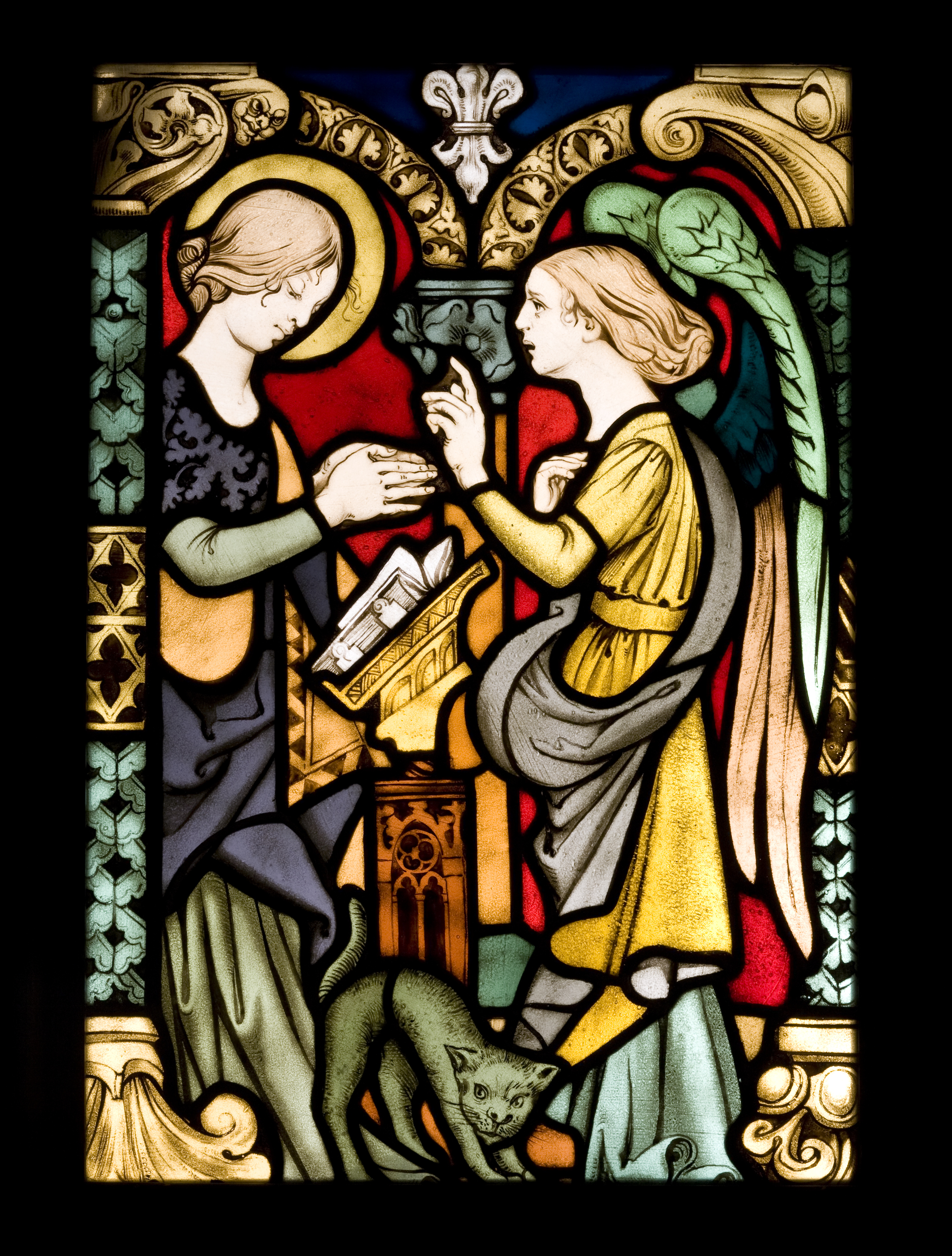
Stained glass: Annunciation, 1902-1906, National Museum in Kraków

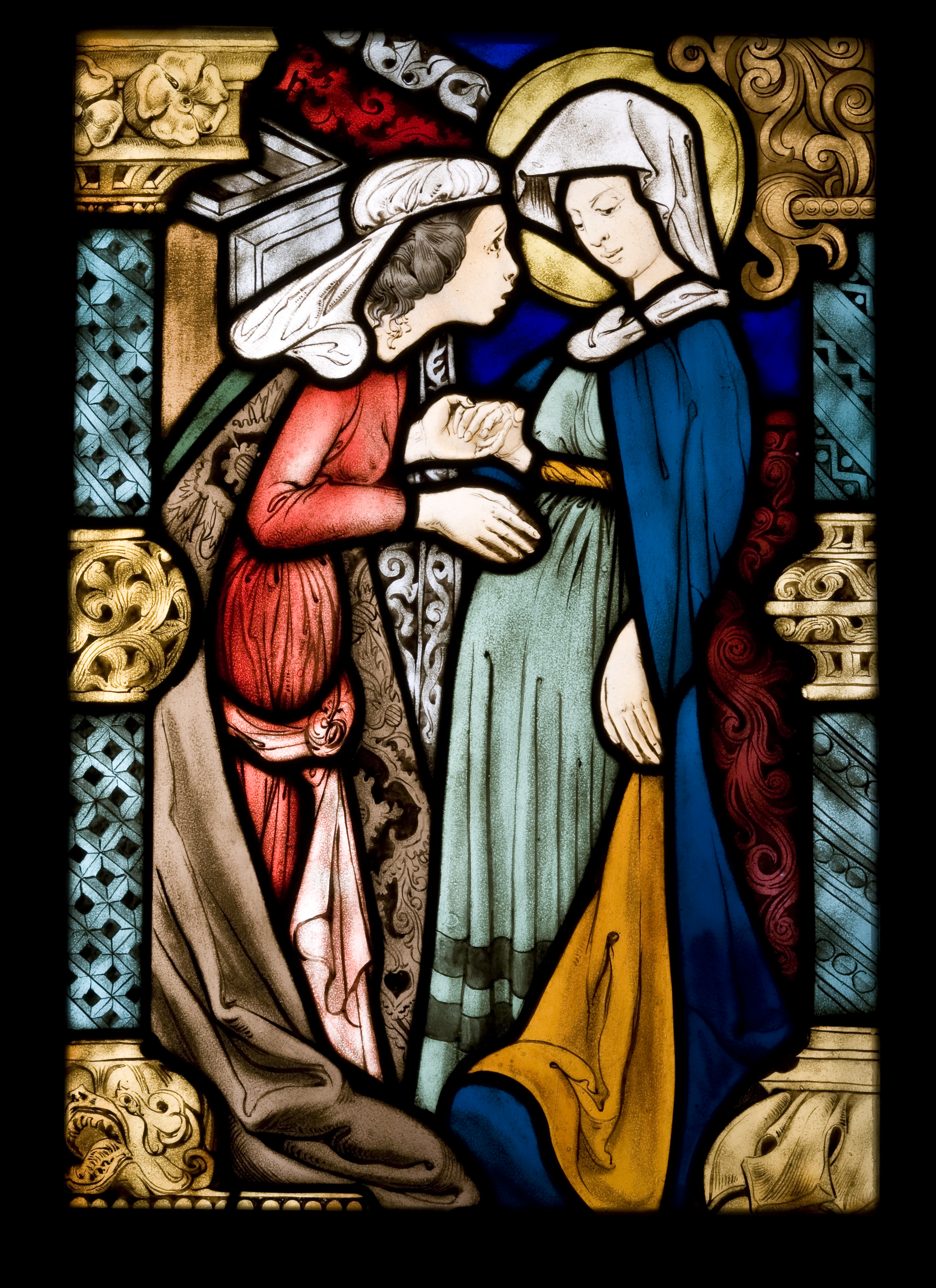
Stained glass: Visitation, 1902-1906, National Museum in Kraków

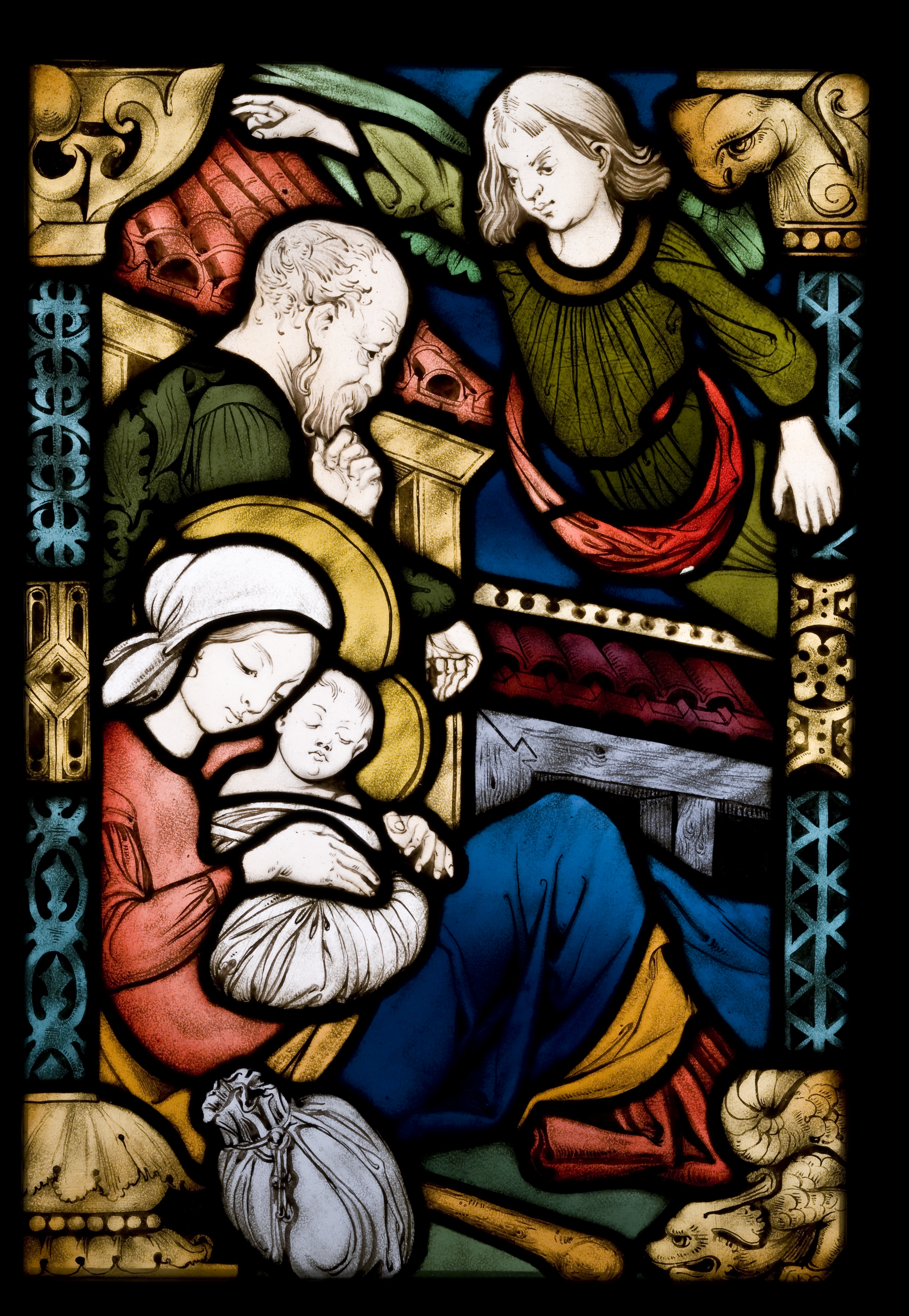
Stained glass: Angel ordering the Holy Family to escape, 1902-1906, National Museum in Kraków

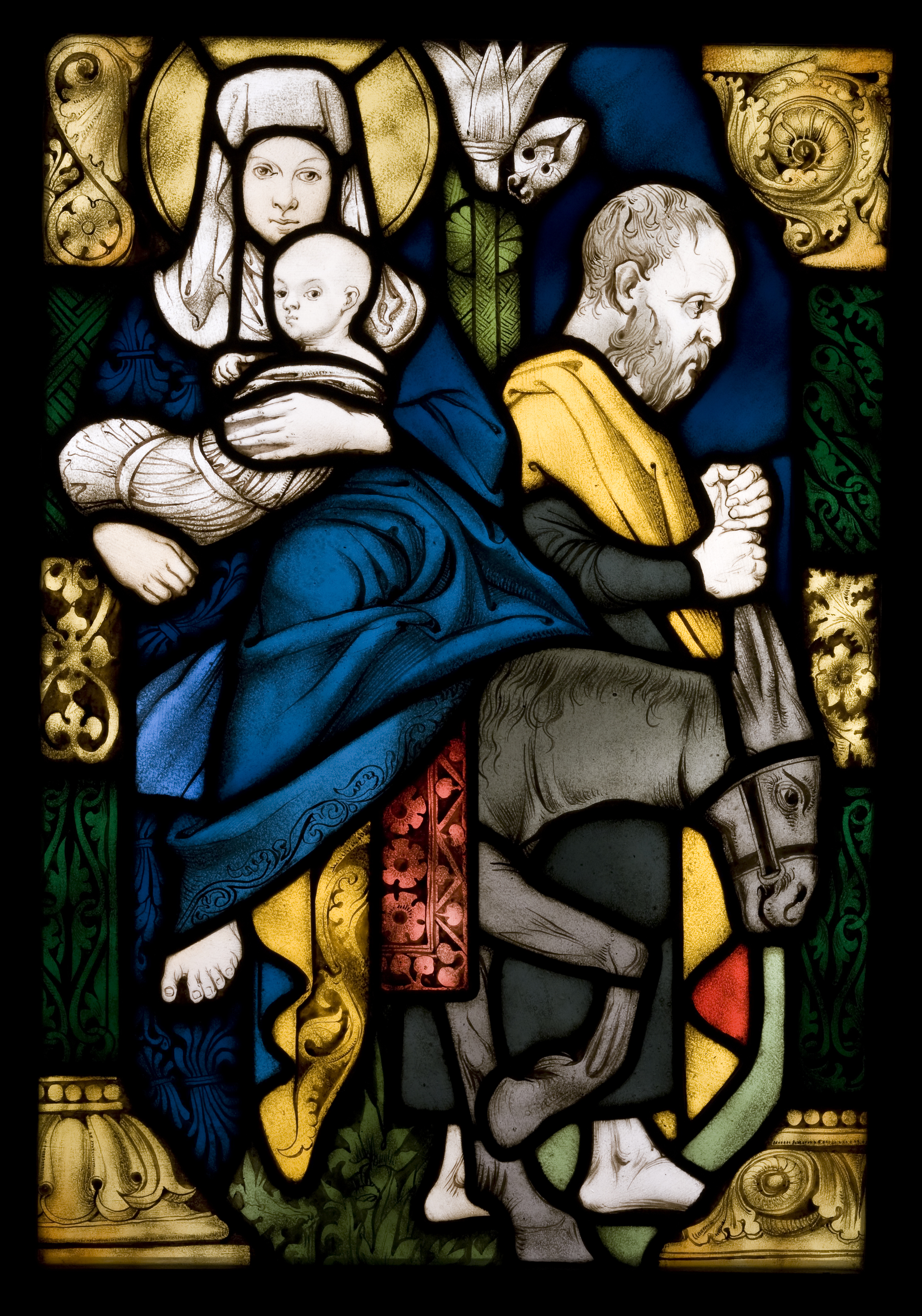
Stained glass: Escape from Egypt, 1902-1906, National Museum in Kraków

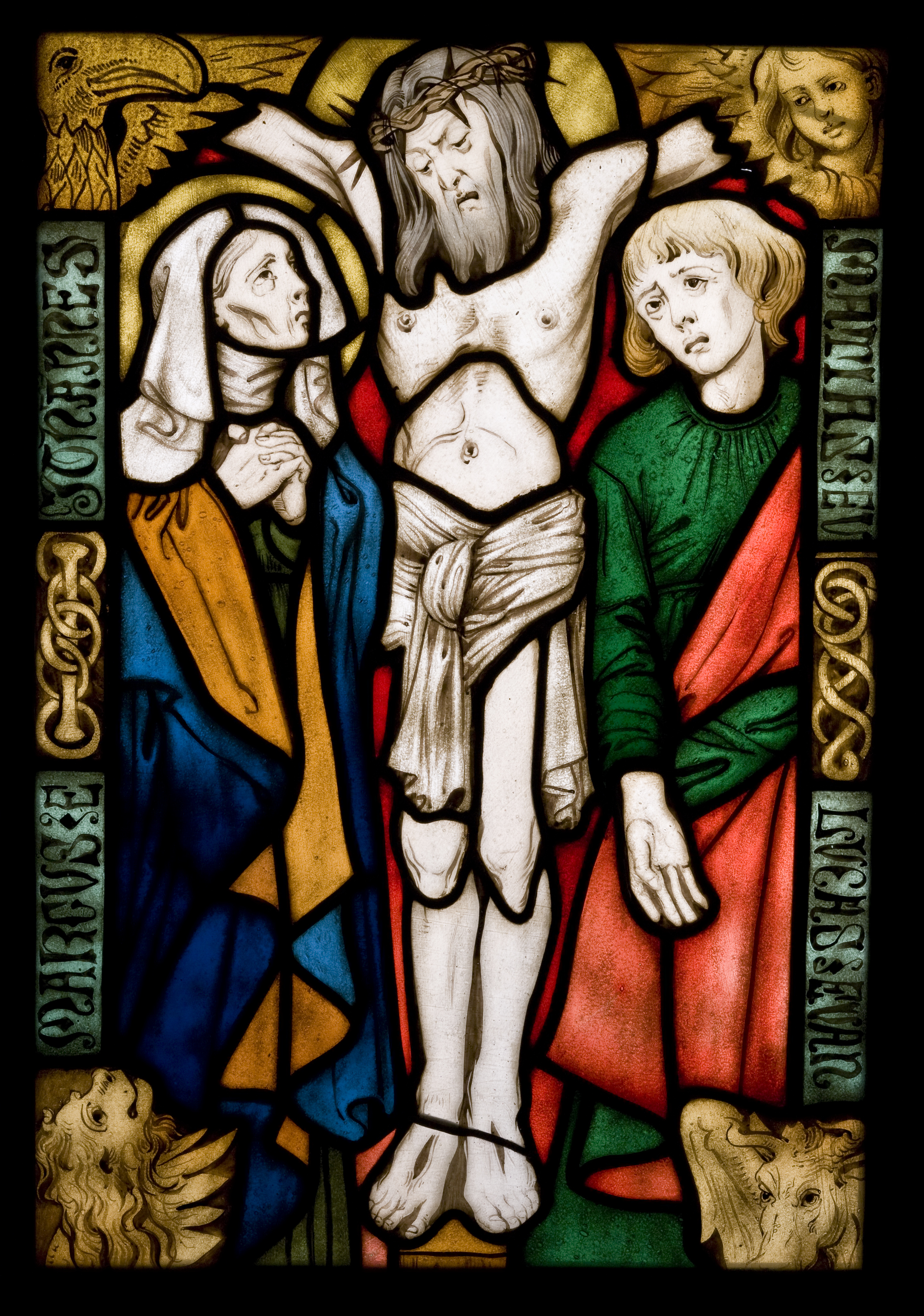
Stained glass: Crucifixion, 1902-1906, National Museum in Kraków

== Leading stage plays ==
- Warszawianka (Varsovian Anthem) (1898)
- Klątwa (The Curse) (1899)
- Protesilas i Leodamia (1899)
- Meleager (1899)
- Legion (1900)
- Wesele (The Wedding) (1901)
- Wyzwolenie (Liberation) (1903)
- Weimar 1829 (fragment, 1904)
- Noc listopadowa (November Night) (1904)
- Acropolis (1904)
- Skałka (1907)
- Powrót Odysa (Return of Odysseus) (1907)
- Zygmunt August (1907 – unfinished)

== Selected works ==
=== Stained glass and polychrome designs ===
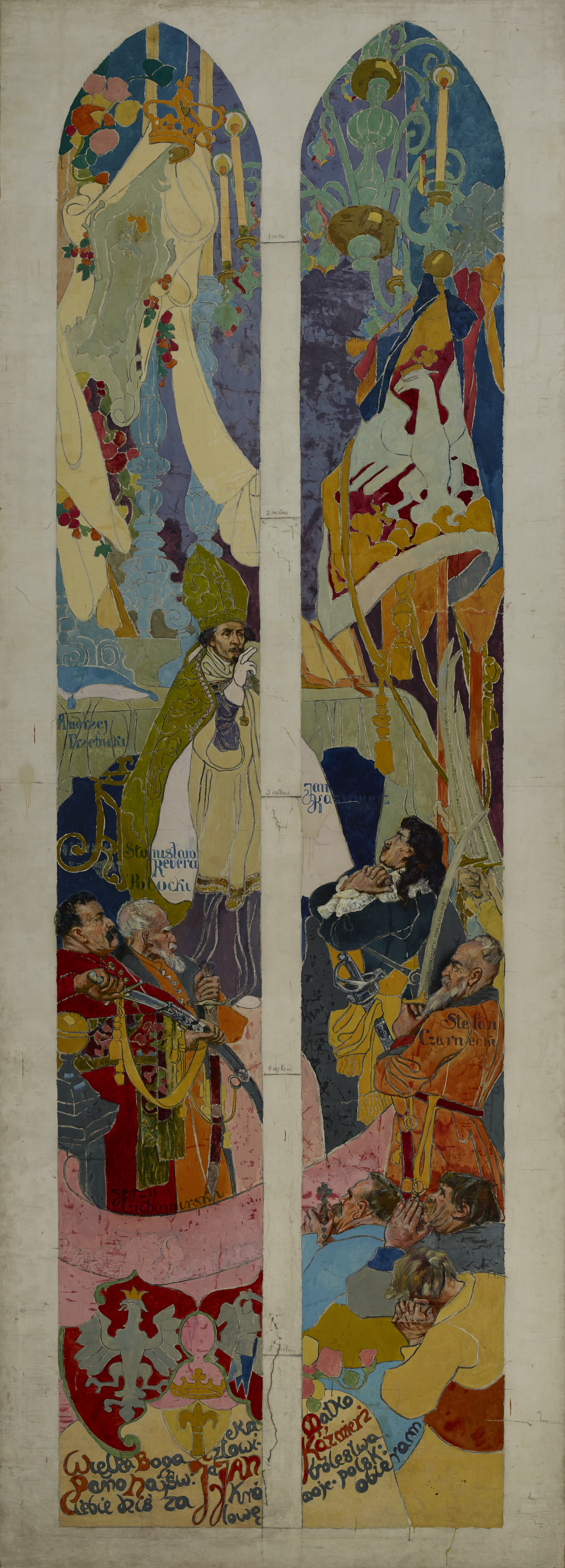
John Casimir's Oath, 1892-1894, National Museum in Kraków

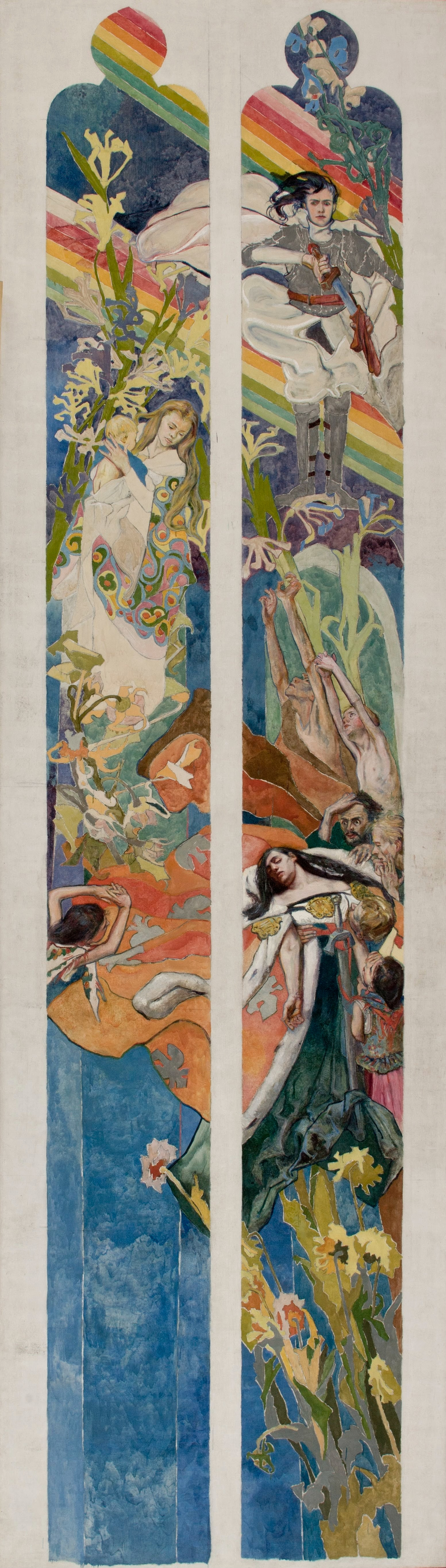
Polonia, 1893-1894, National Museum in Kraków

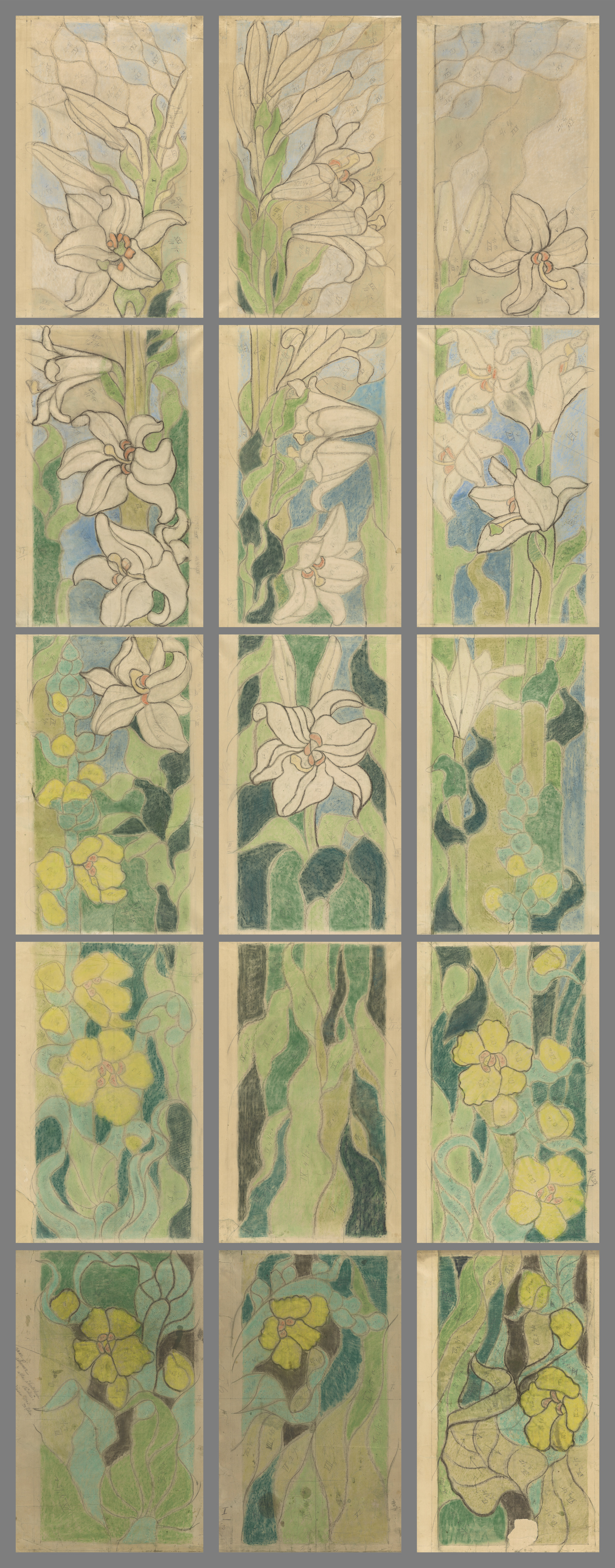
Blessed Salomea of Poland, 1897, National Museum in Kraków

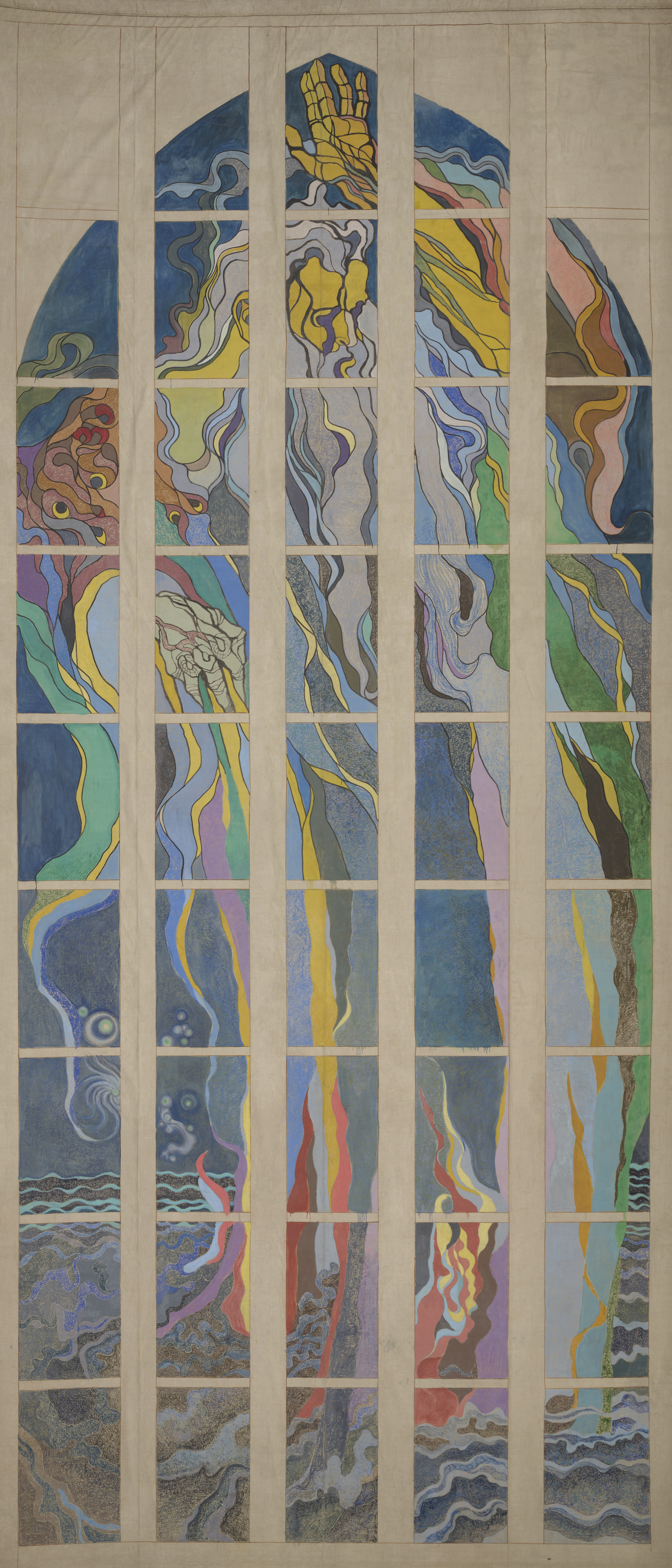
Become!, 1904, National Museum in Kraków

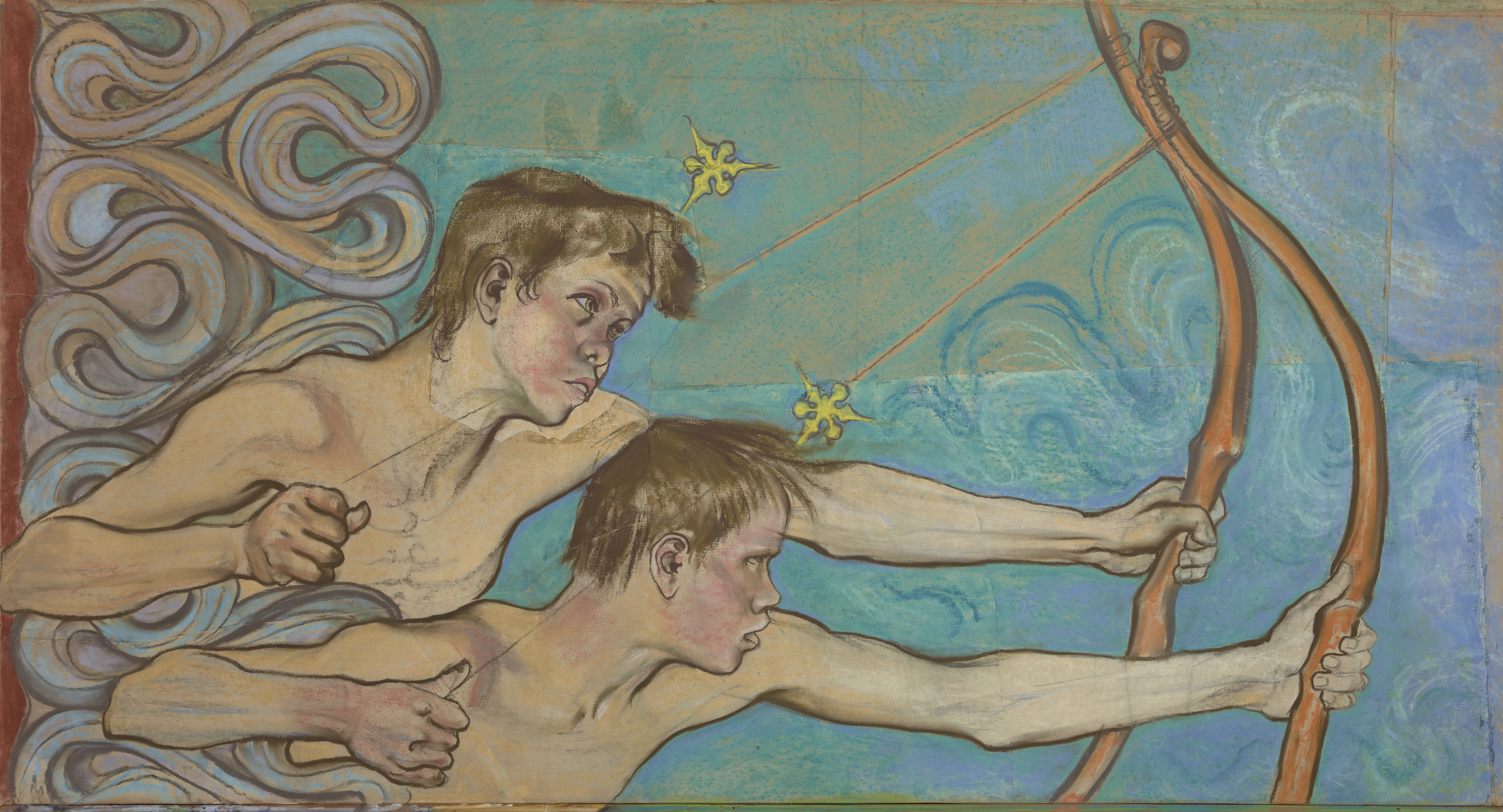
Archers – Fragment of the Composition „Fallen Angels”, 1895, National Museum in Kraków

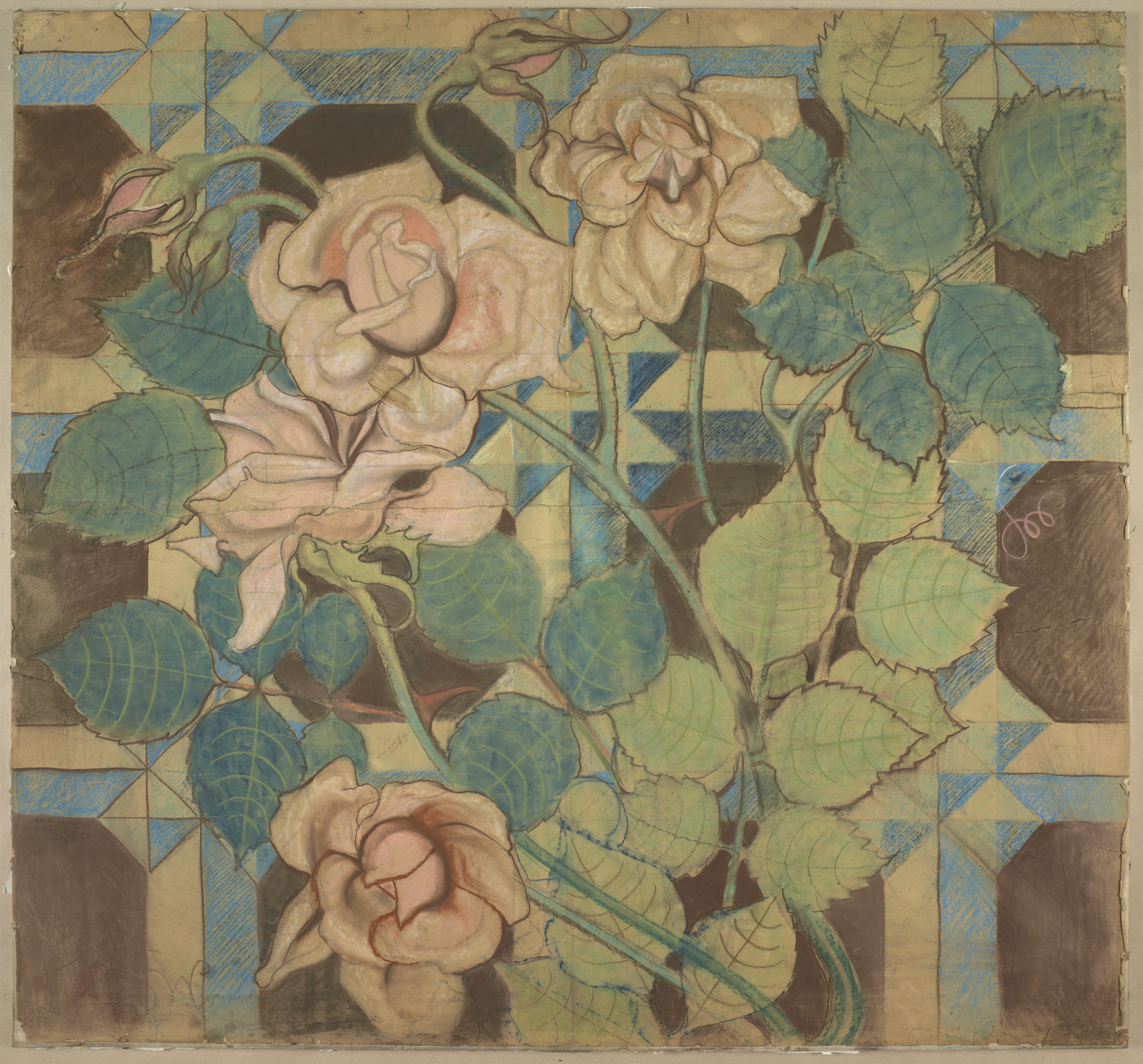
Roses, 1897, National Museum in Kraków

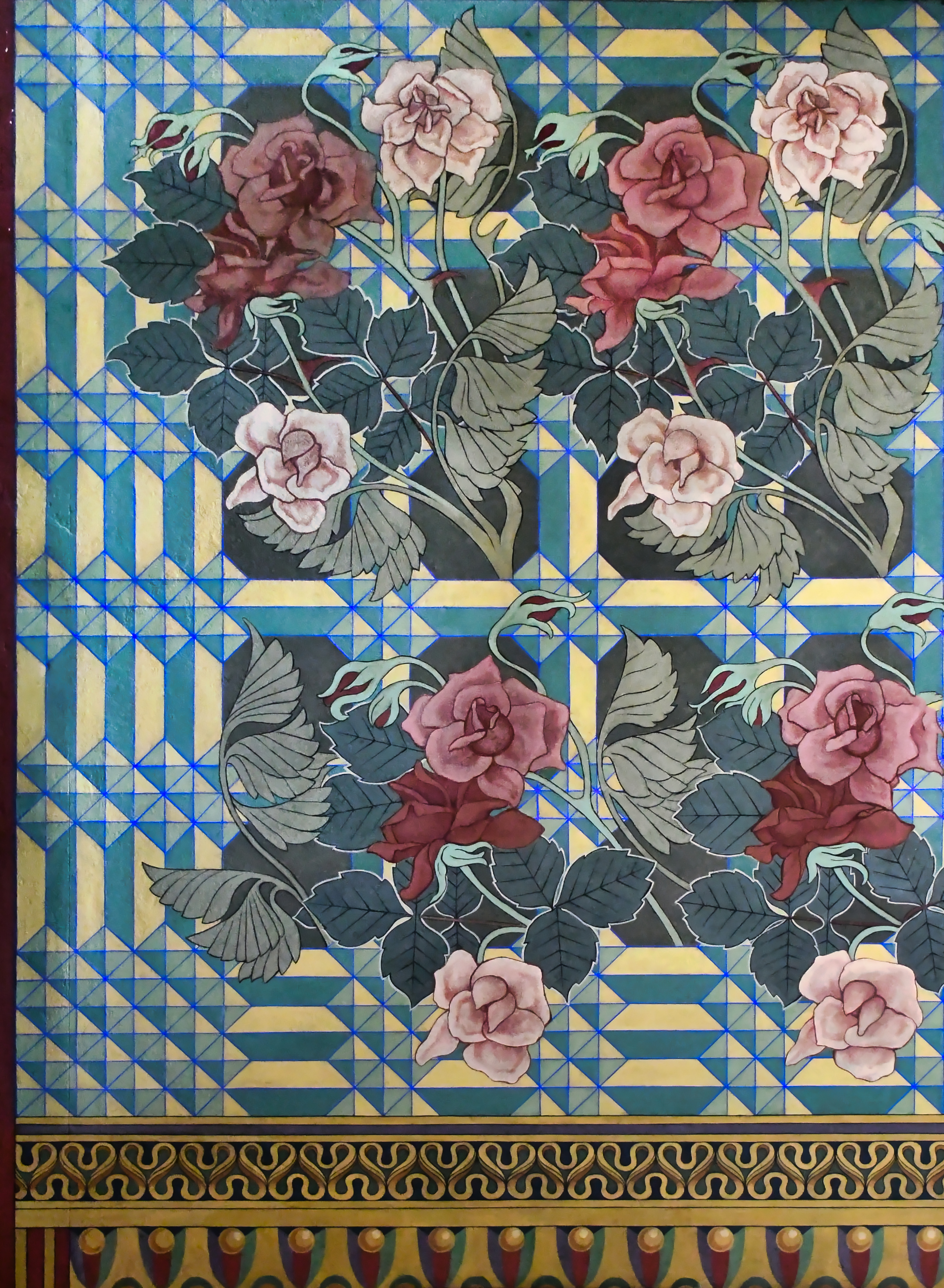
Roses polichrome
church of St. Francis of Assisi in Kraków

=== Portraits ===
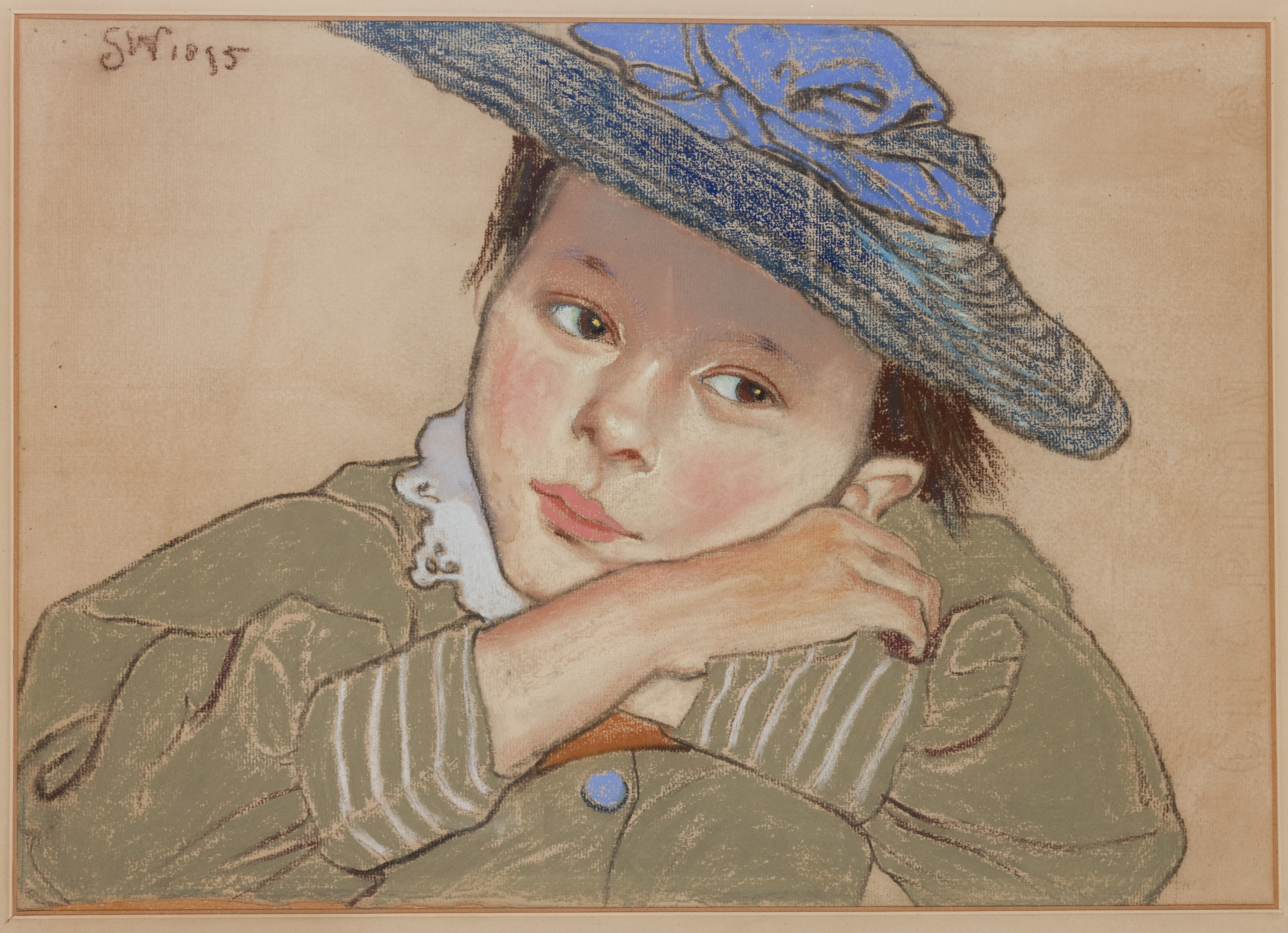
Girl in a Blue Hat, 1895, National Museum in Kraków

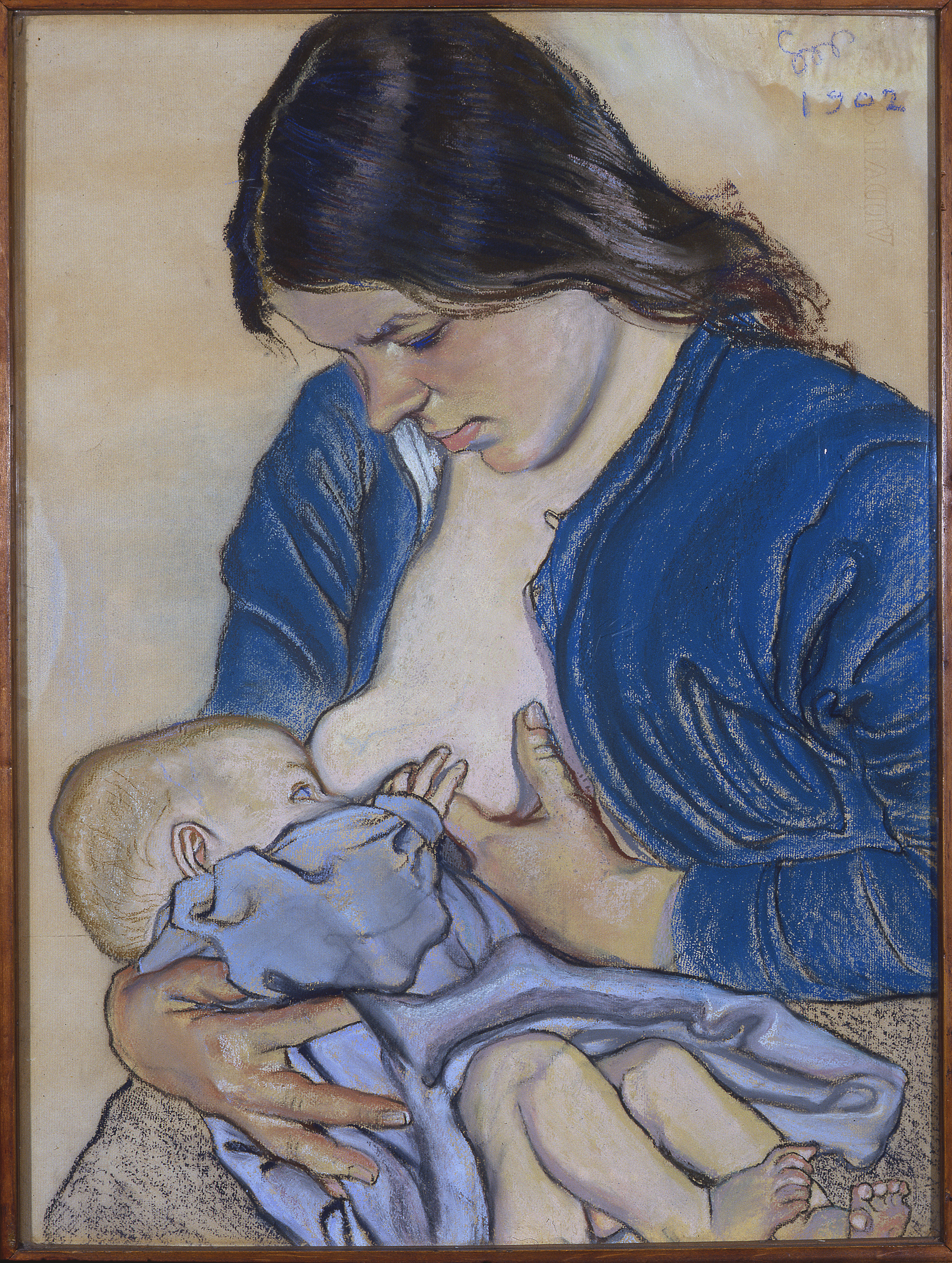
Motherhood, 1902, National Museum in Warsaw

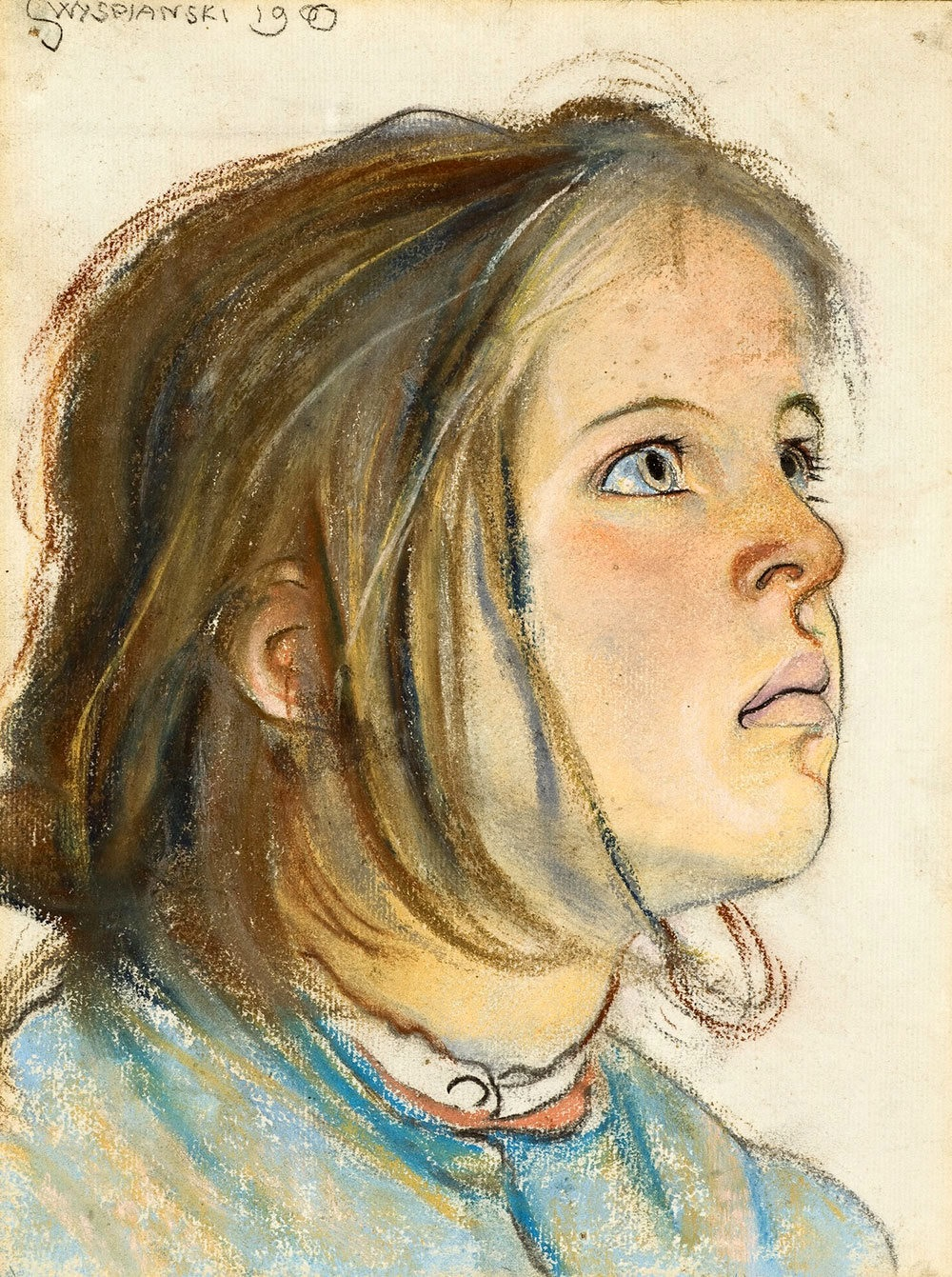
Helenka, 1900, National Museum in Wrocław

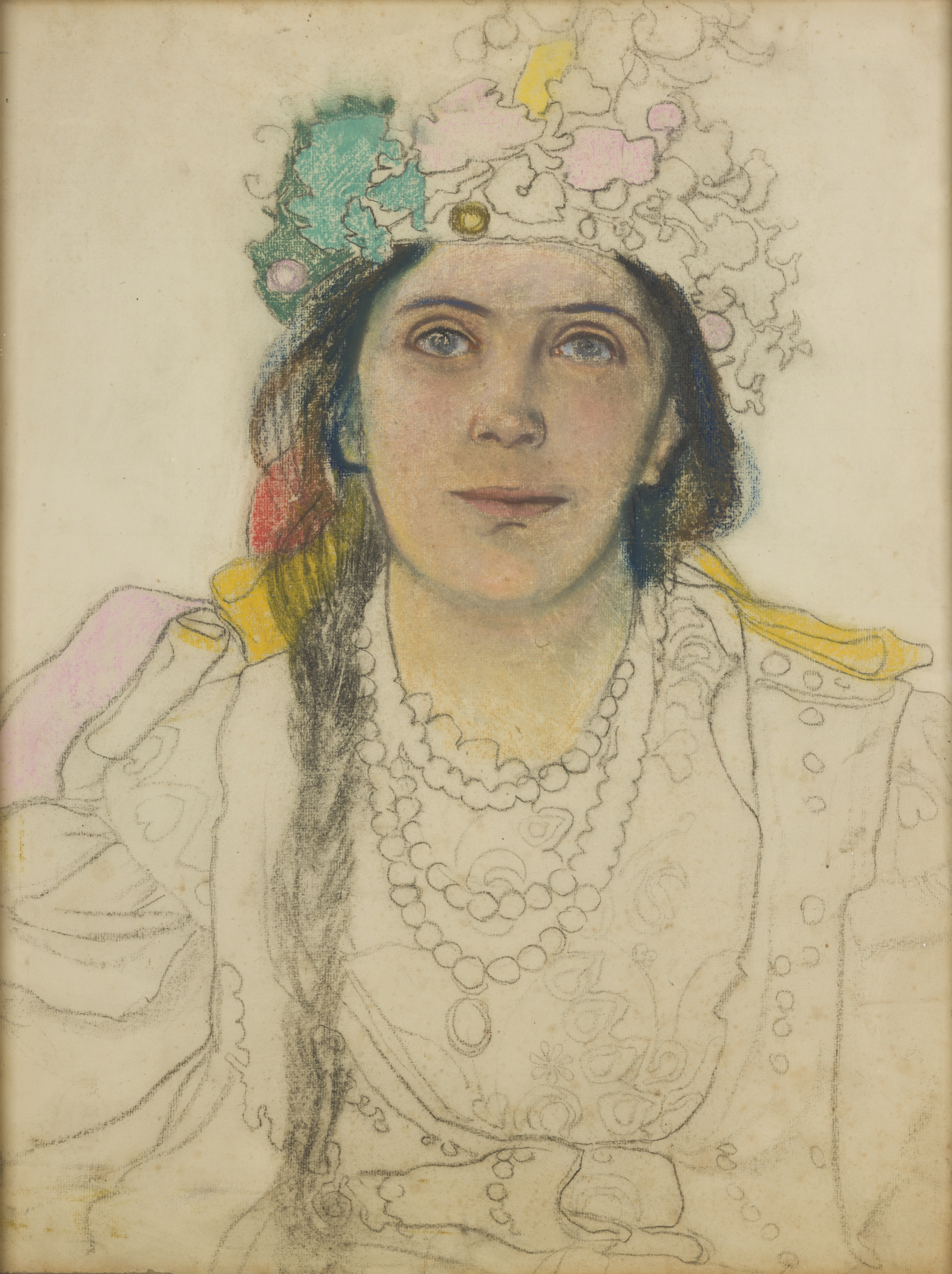
Portrait of Wanda Siemaszkowa as the Bride in The Wedding, 1901, National Museum in Kraków

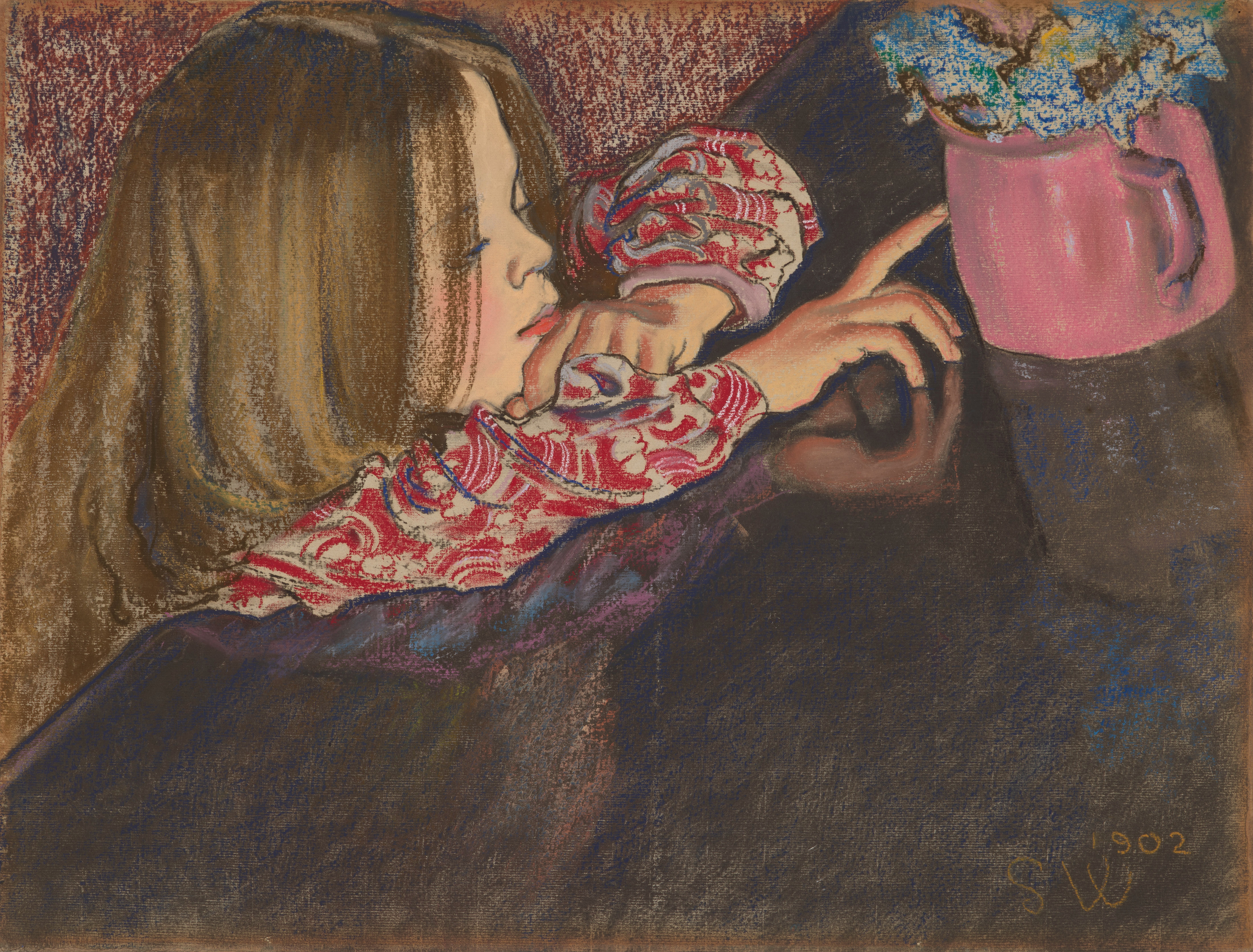
Little Helen with a Vase, 1902, National Museum in Kraków

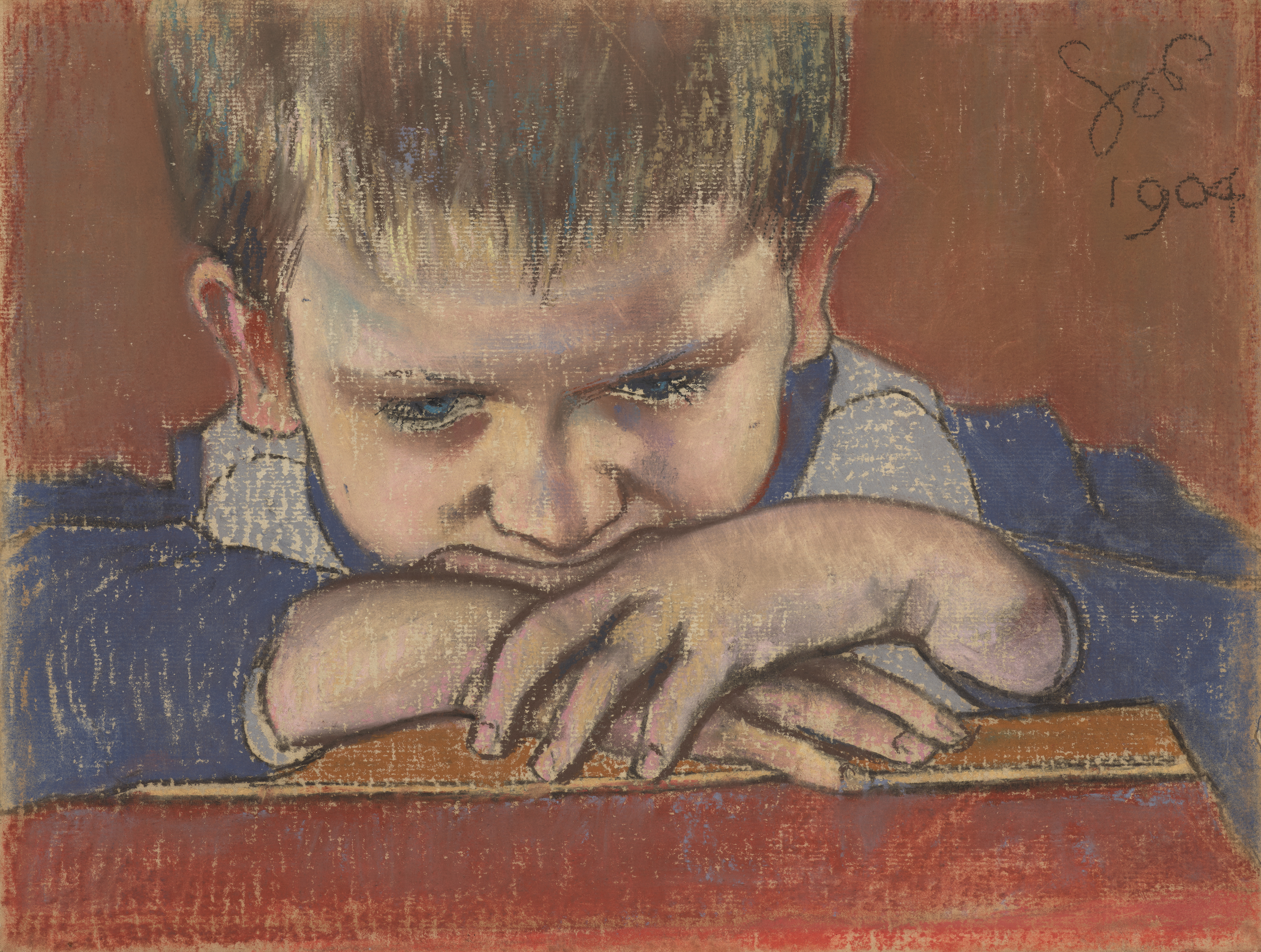
Mietek Leaning on Hands, 1904, National Museum in Kraków

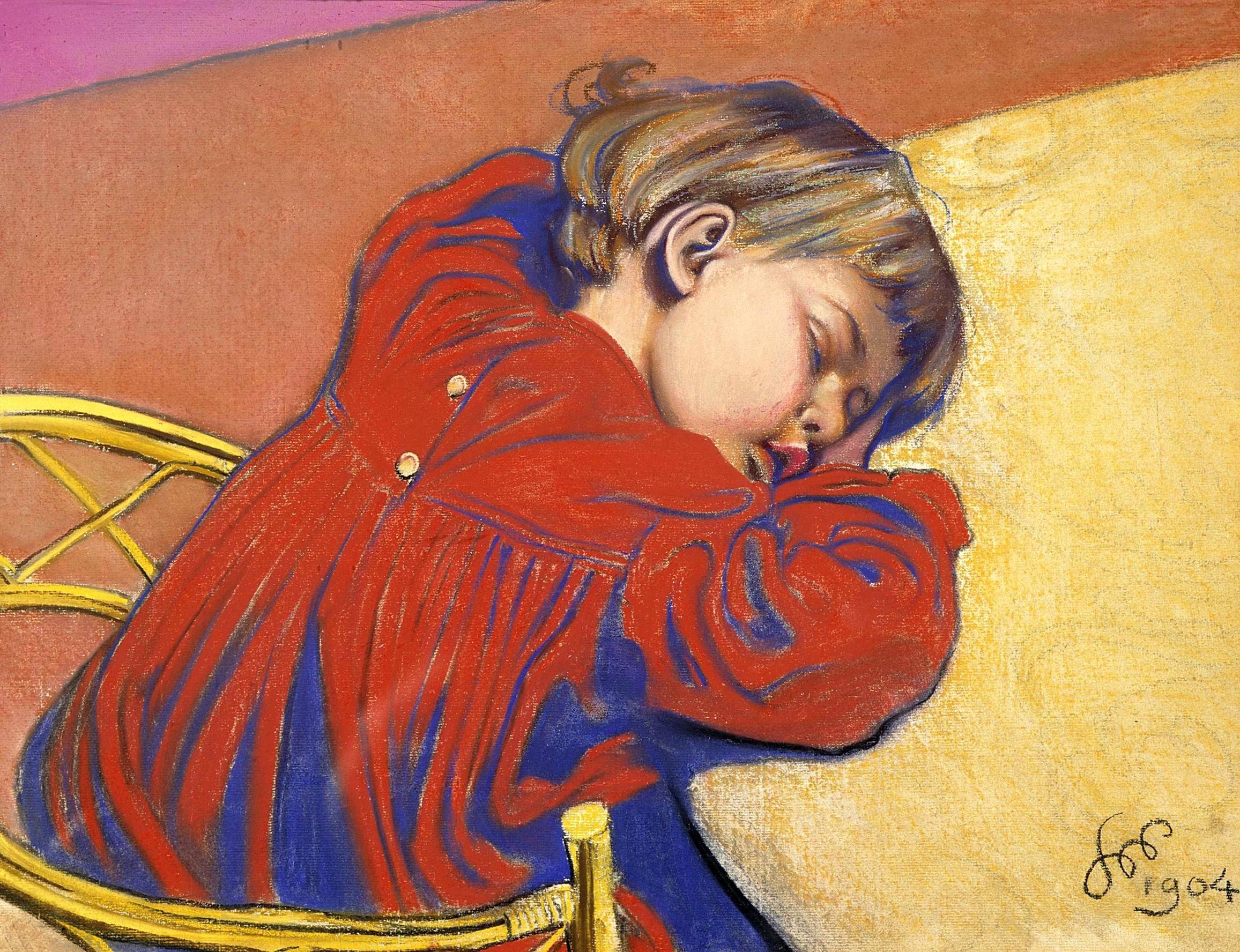
Sleeping Staś, 1904, National Museum in Poznań

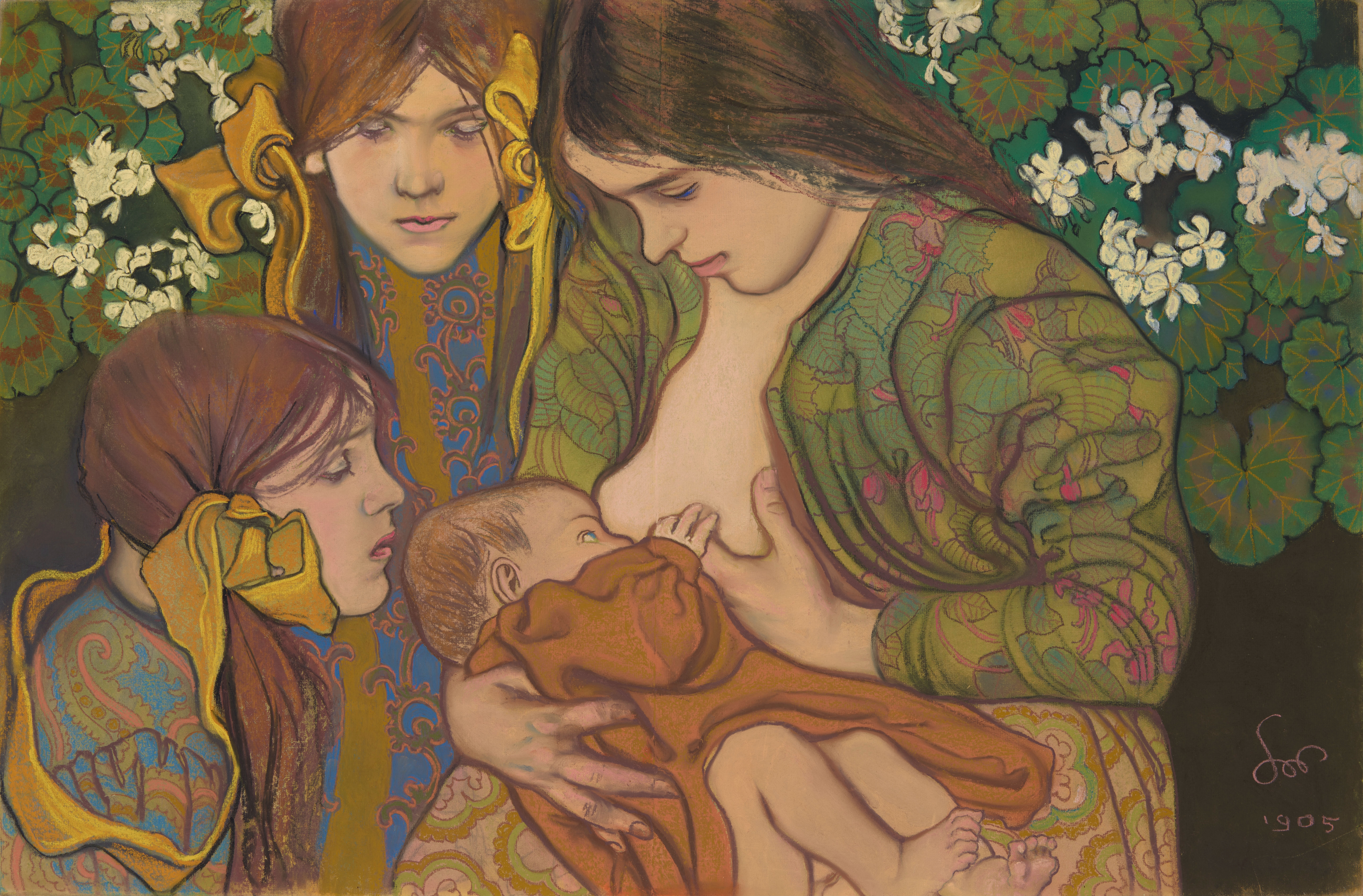
Motherhood, 1905, National Museum in Kraków

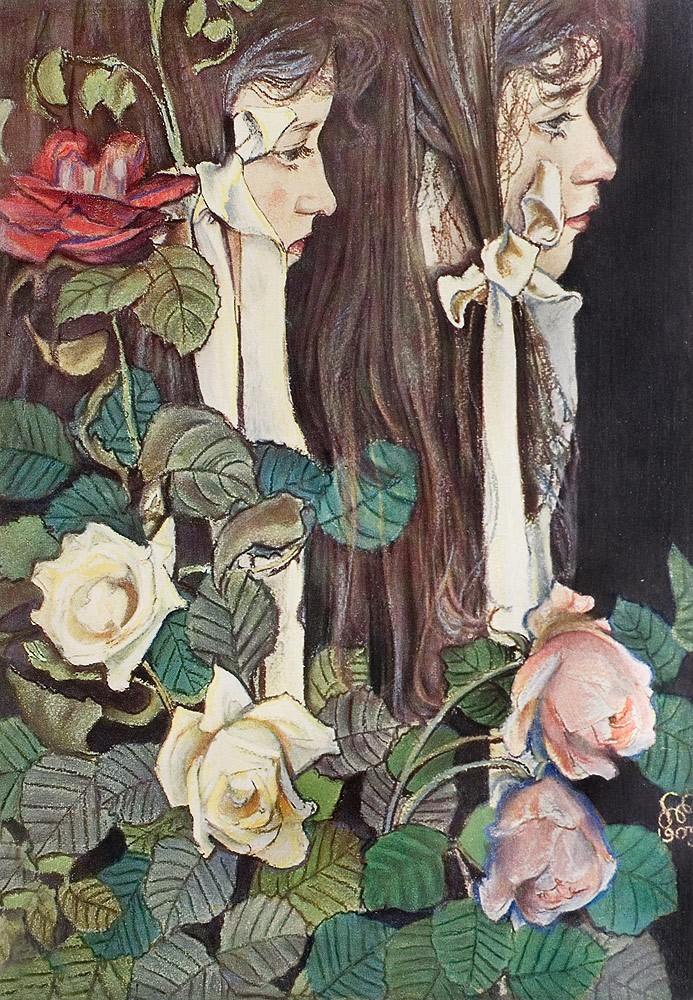
2xEliza Parenska, 1905, National Museum in Wrocław

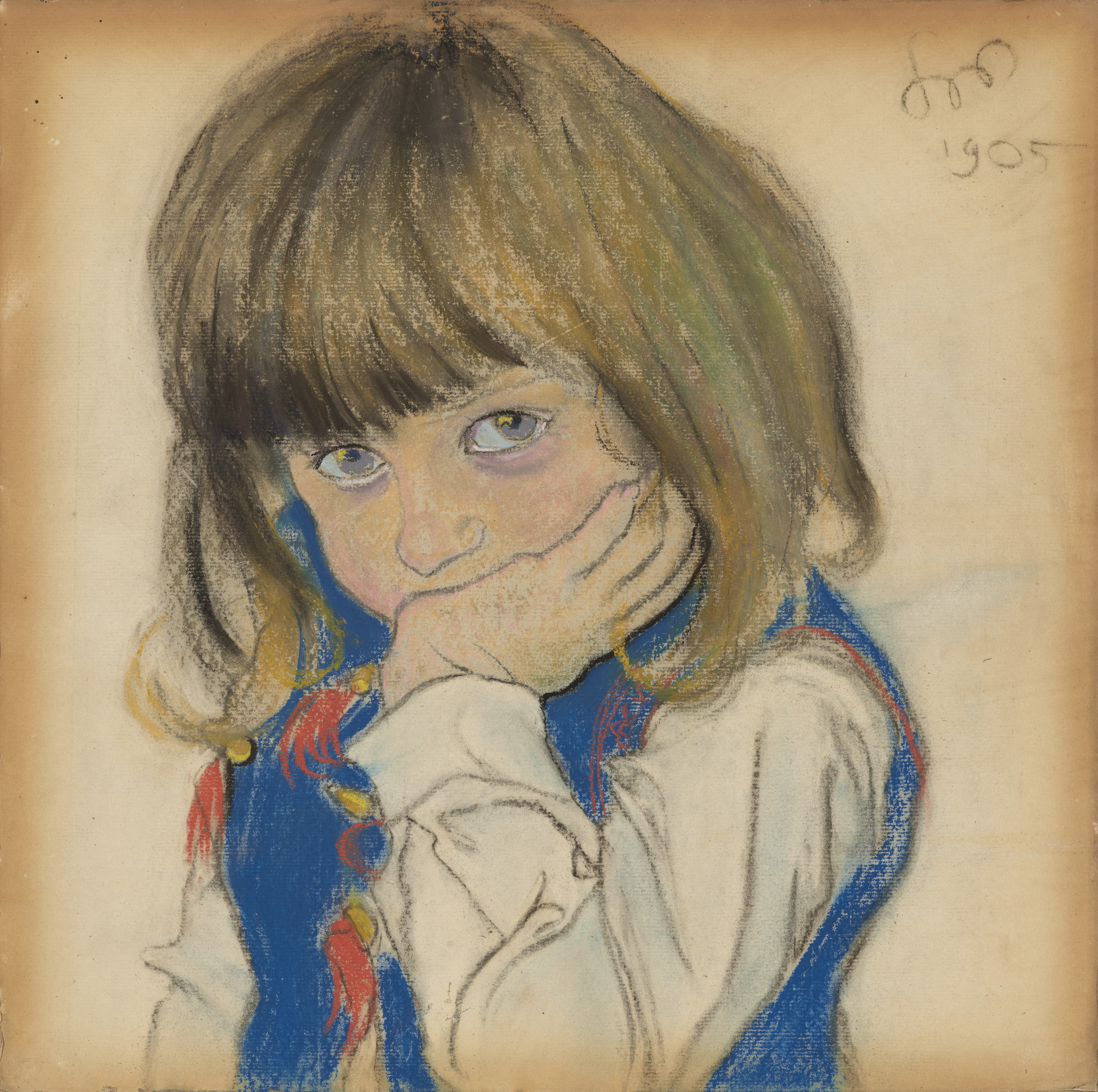
Portrait of a Boy (Józio Feldman), 1905, National Museum in Kraków

=== Self-Portraits ===
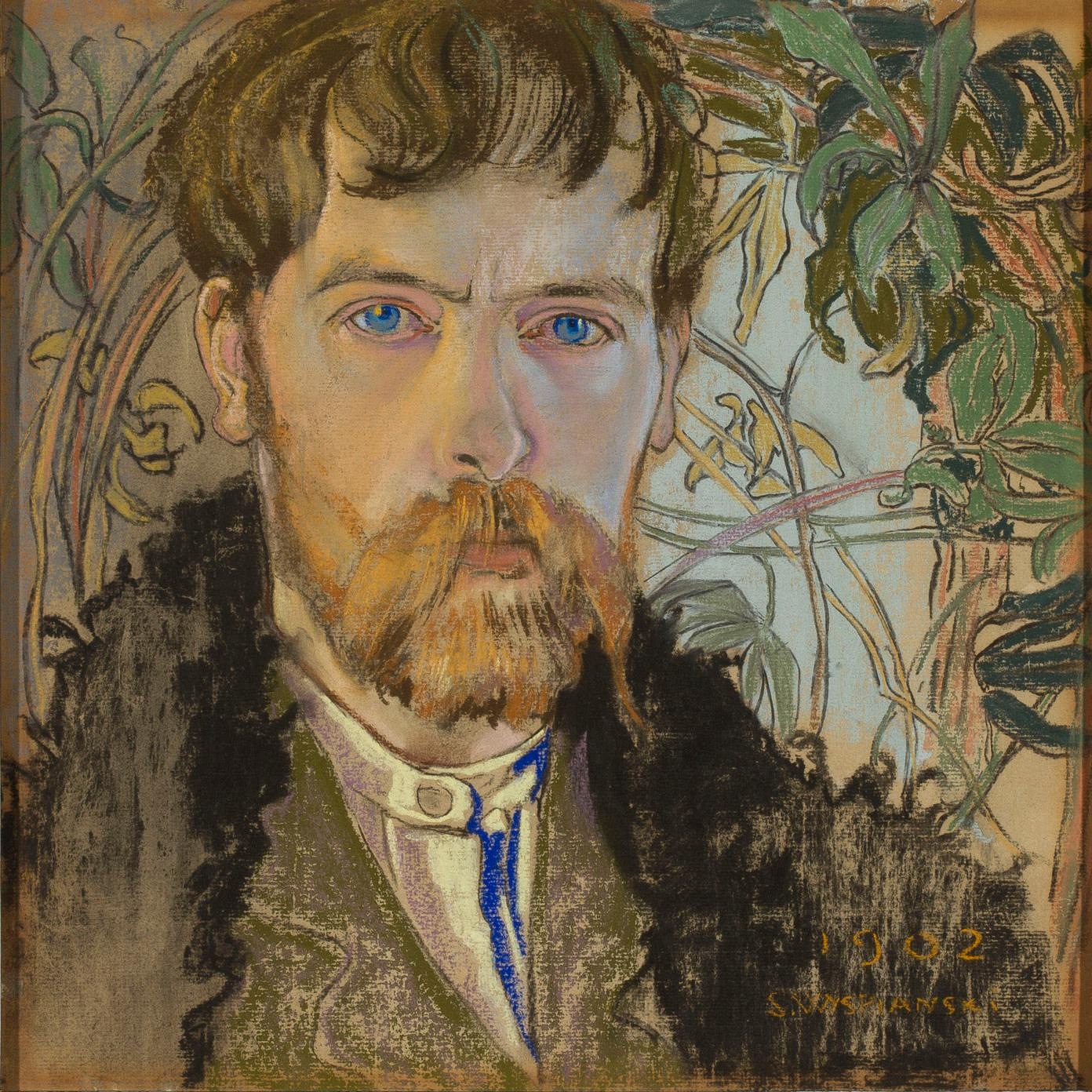
Self-Portrait, 1902, National Museum in Warsaw

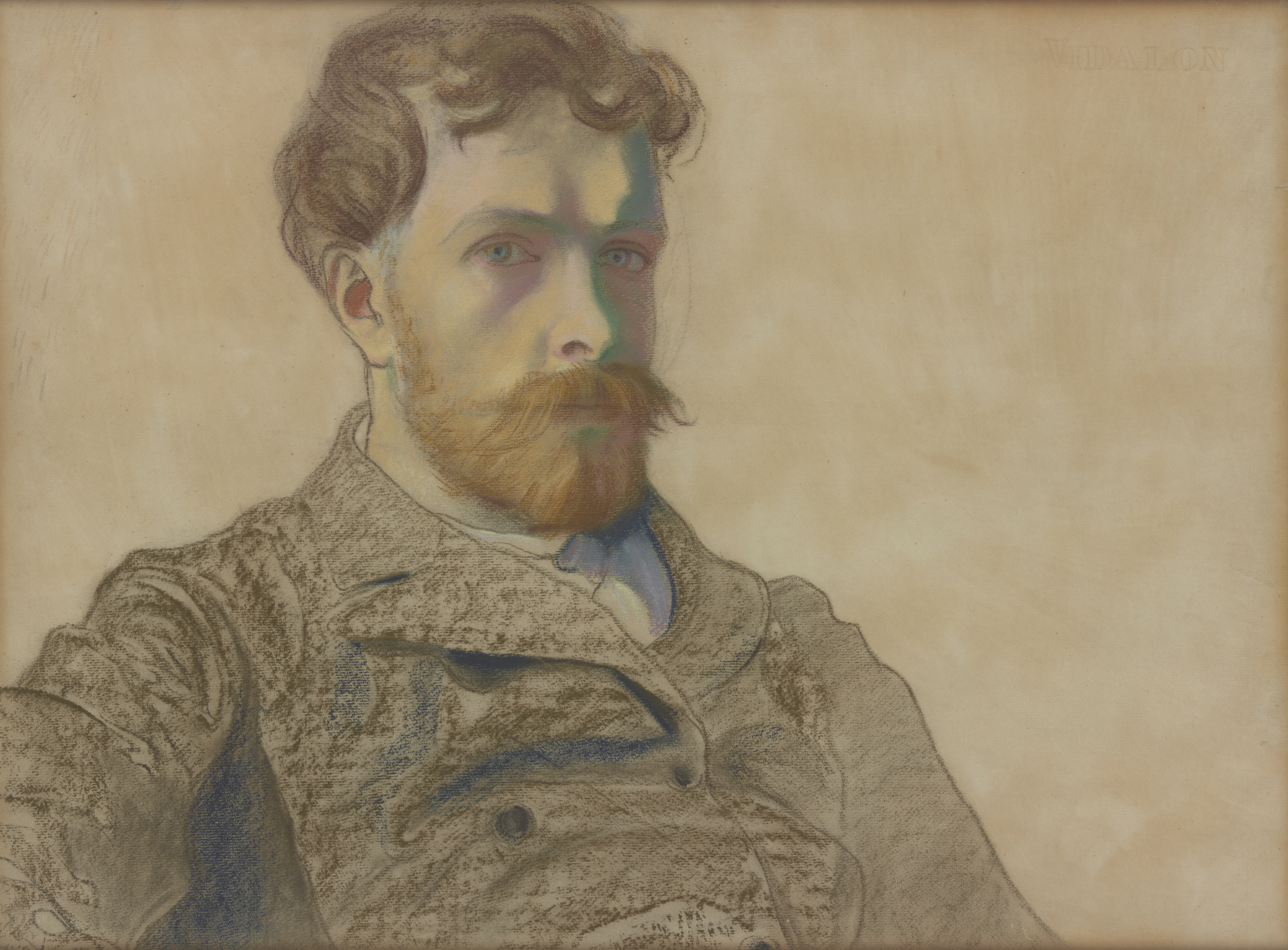
Self-Portrait, 1903, National Museum in Kraków

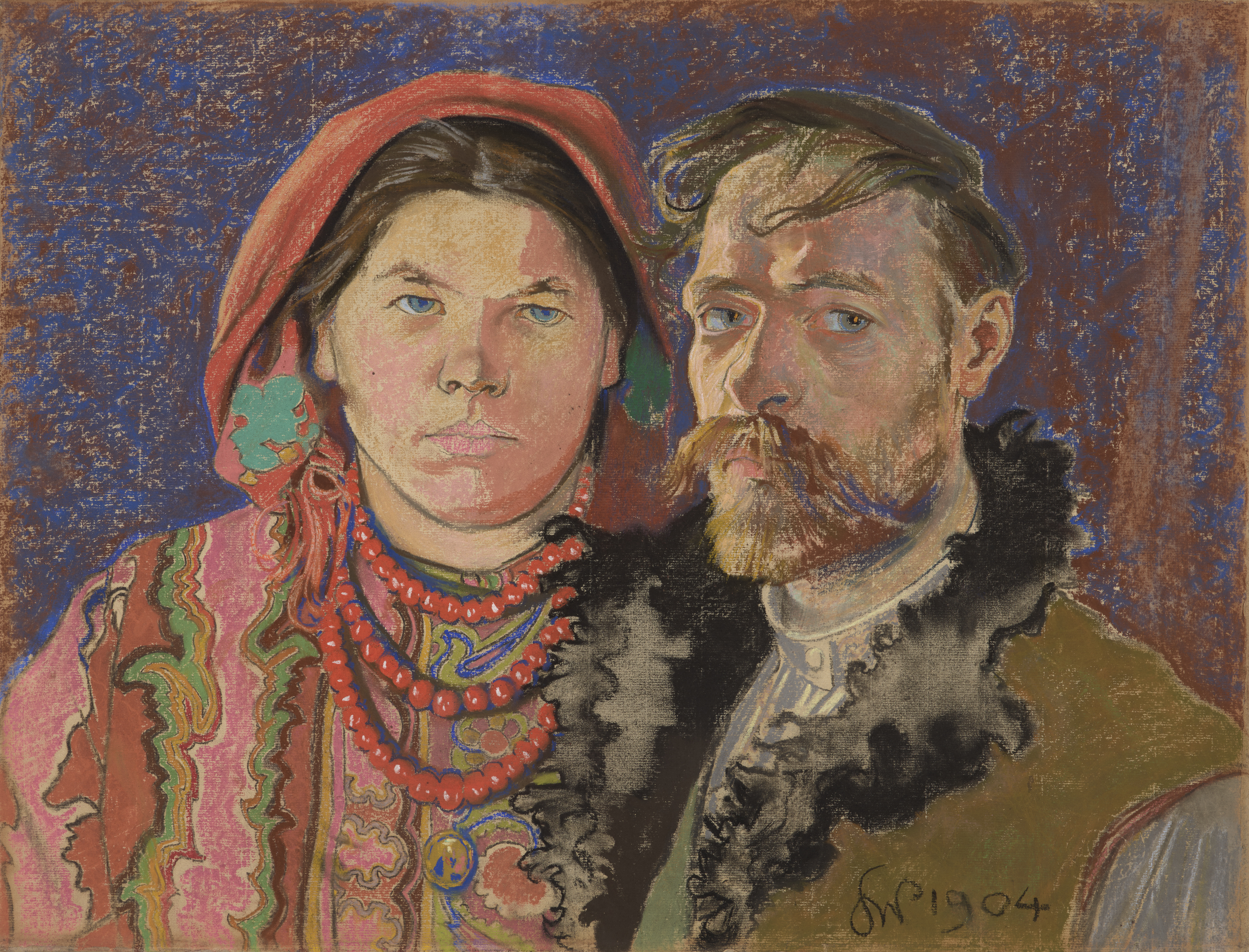
Self-Portrait with Wife, 1904, National Museum in Kraków

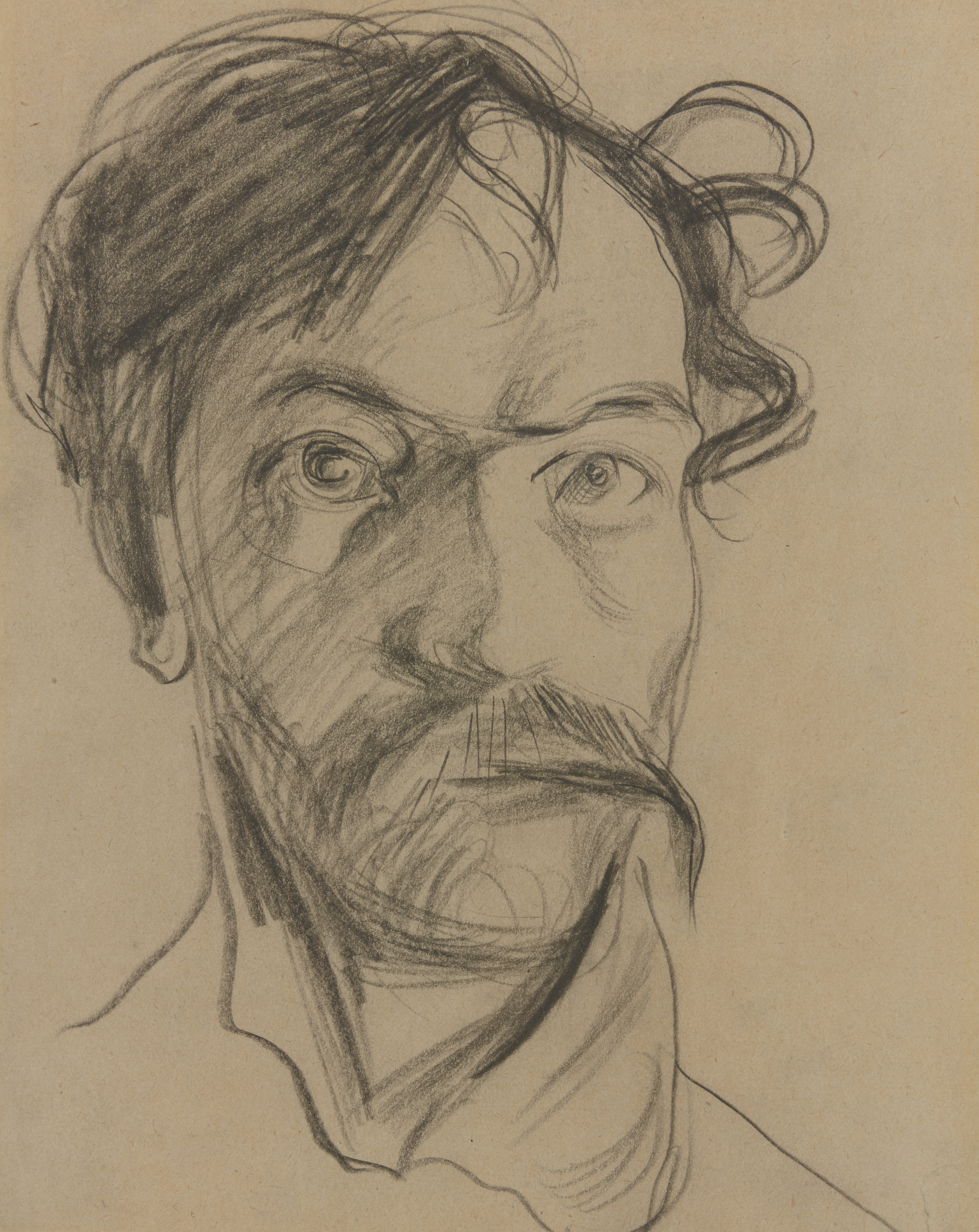
Self-Portrait from the Month Before Dying, 1907, National Museum in Kraków

=== Landscapes ===
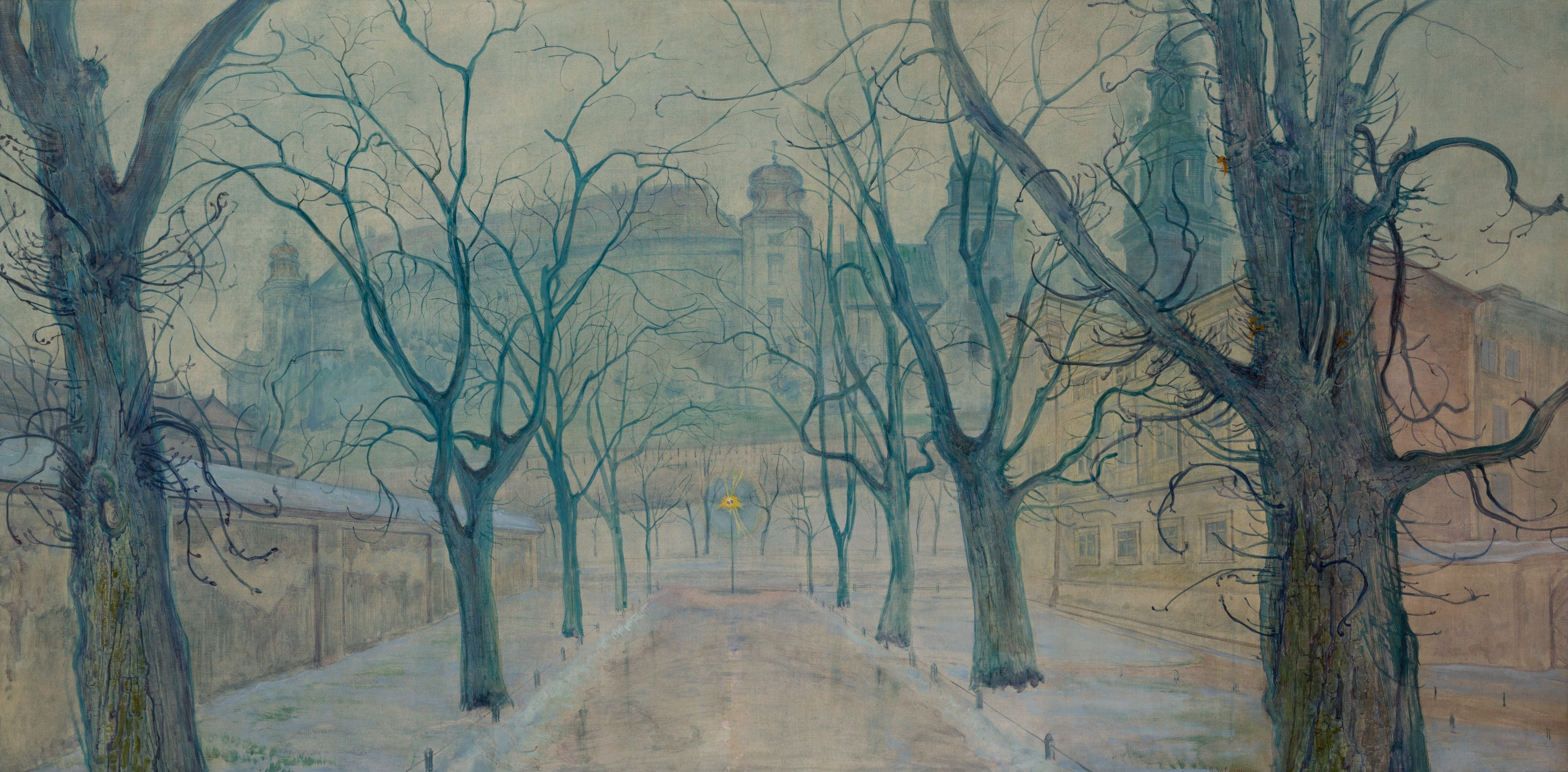
Planty Park at Dawn, 1894, National Museum in Kraków

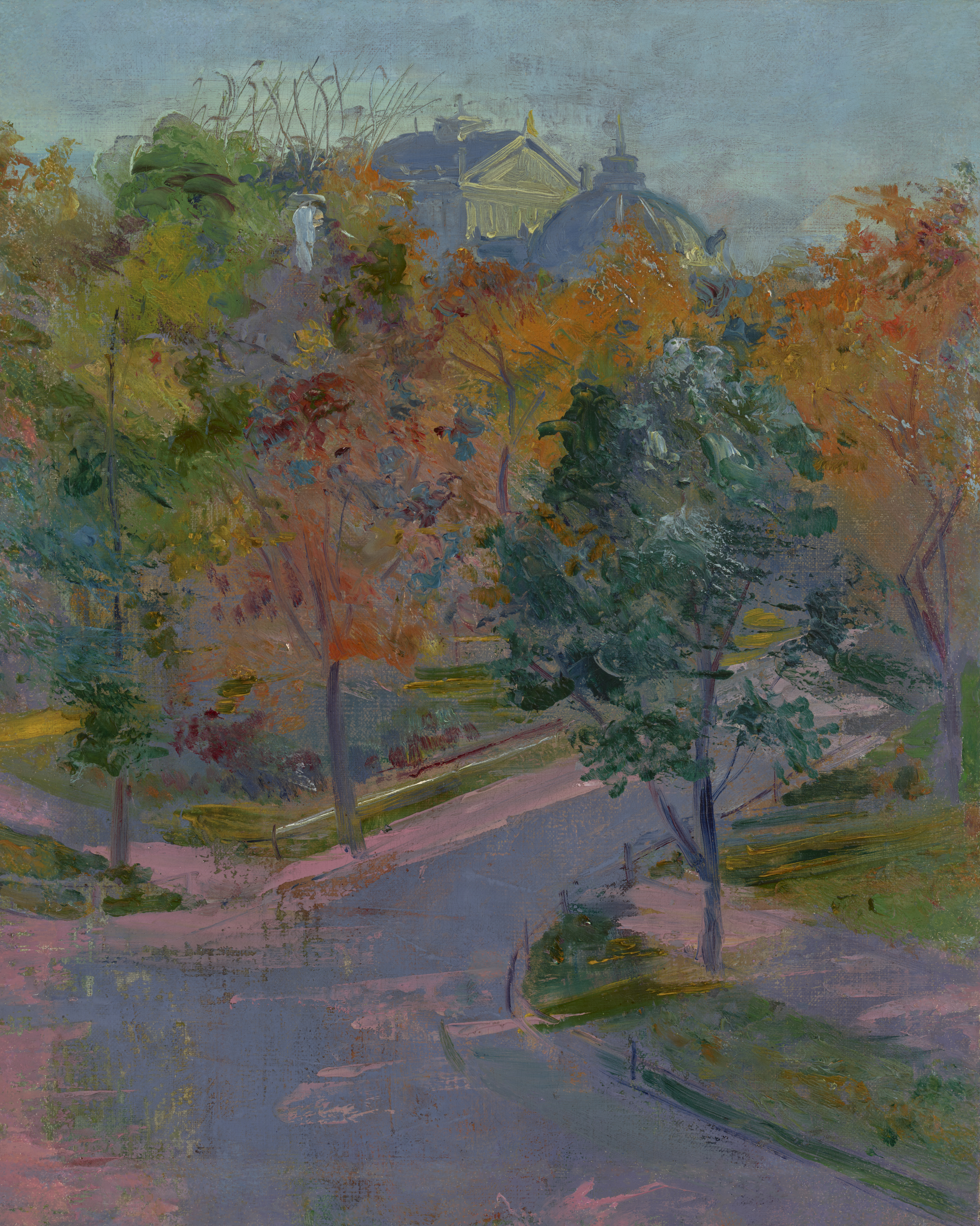
View of the Municipal Theatre Krakow from Zacisze Street, 1894, National Museum in Kraków

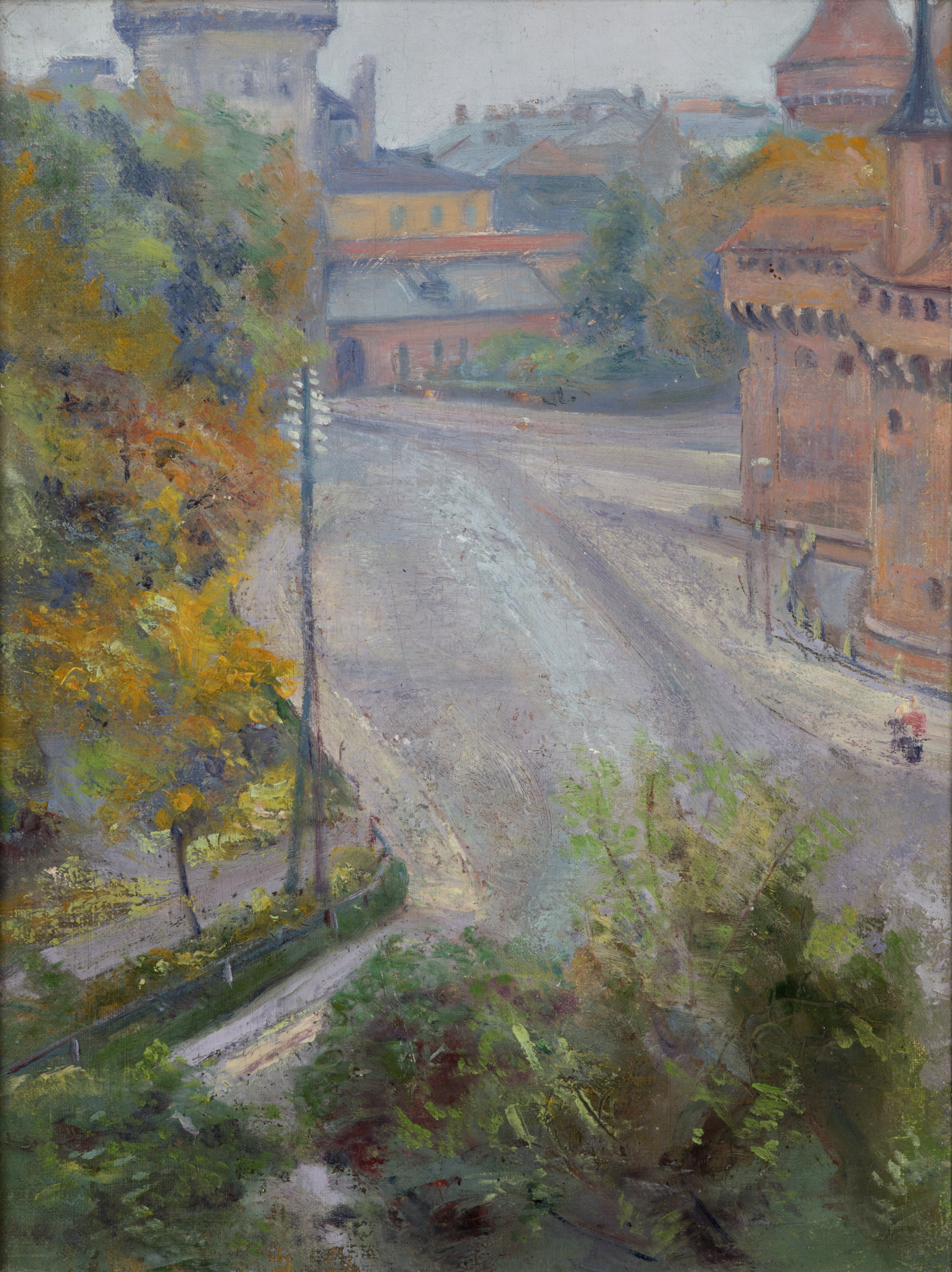
The Barbican and the Floriańska Street – View from Zacisze Street, 1894, National Museum in Kraków

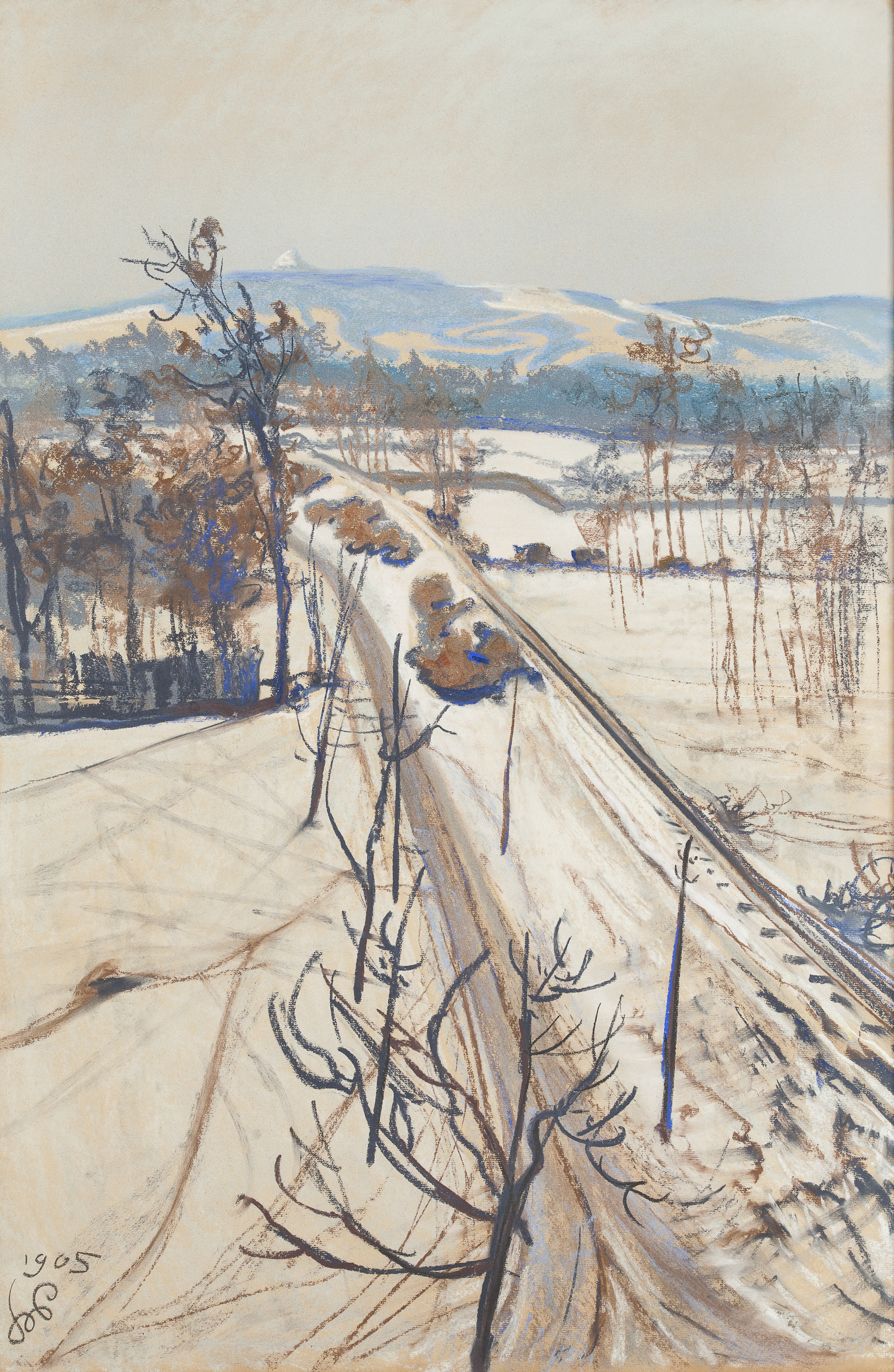
View of Kościuszko Mound, 1905, National Museum in Kraków

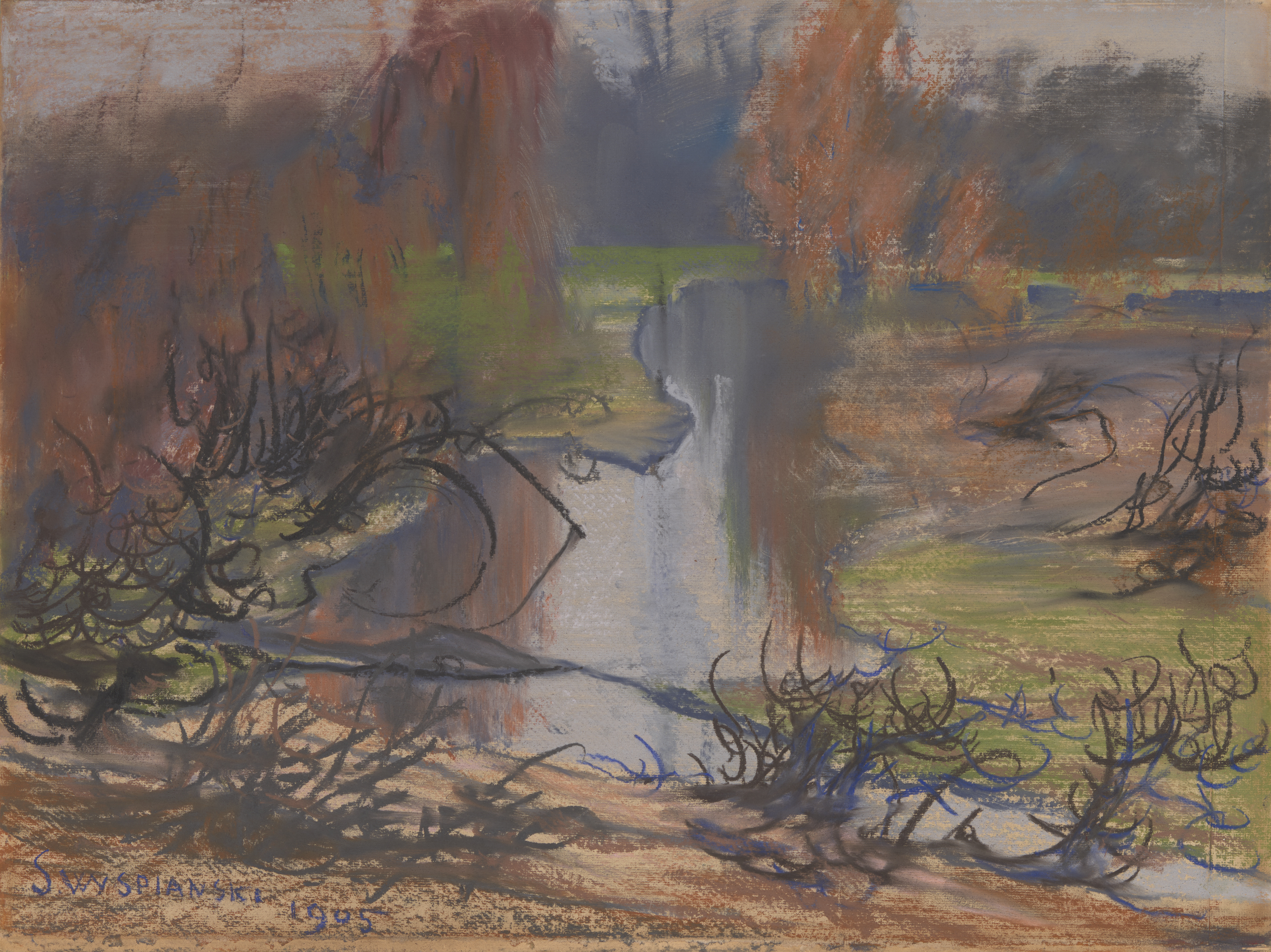
Rudawa river, 1905, National Museum in Kraków

=== Other projects ===
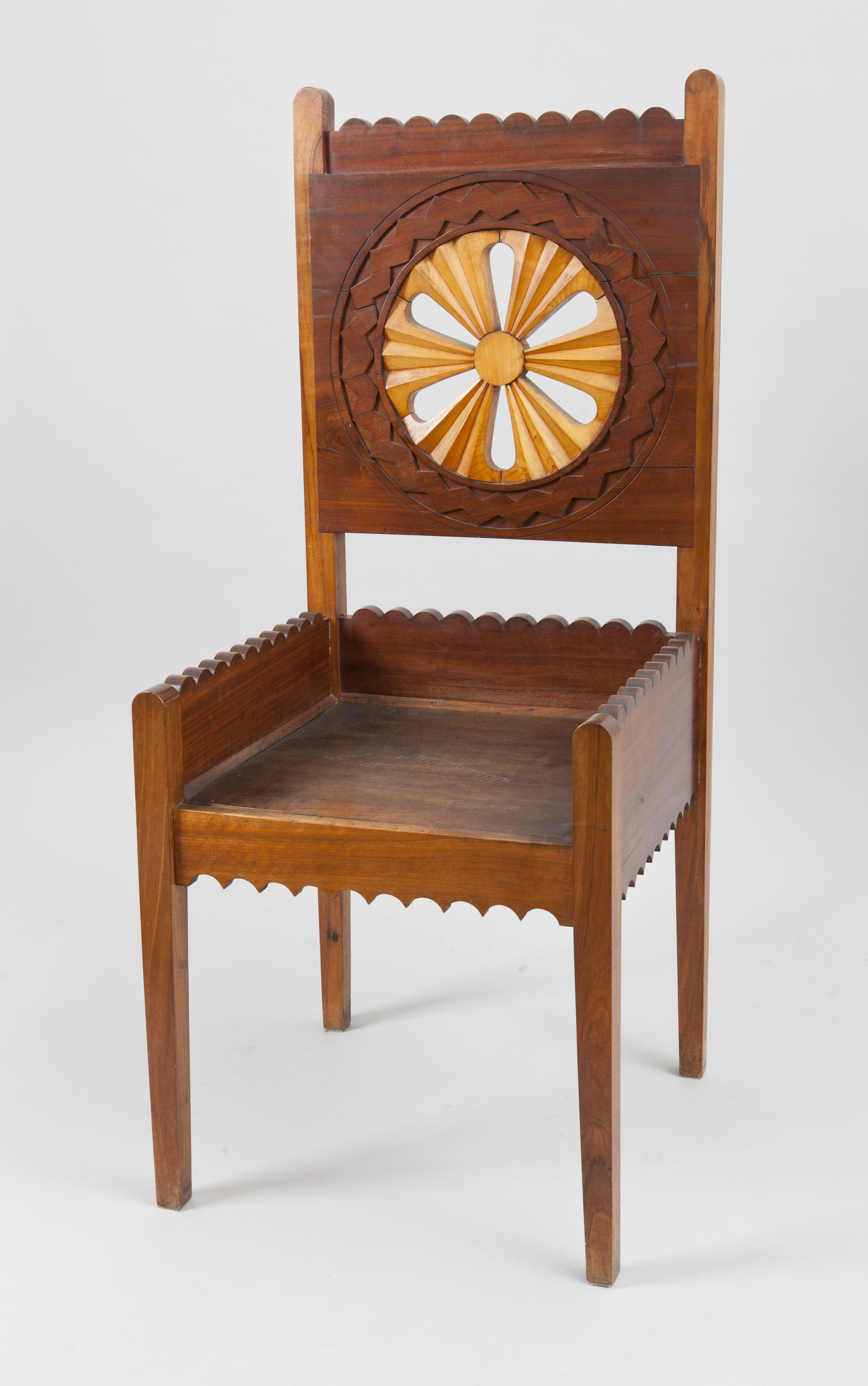
Chair designed by Stanisław Wyspiański between 1904 and 1905, National Museum in Kraków

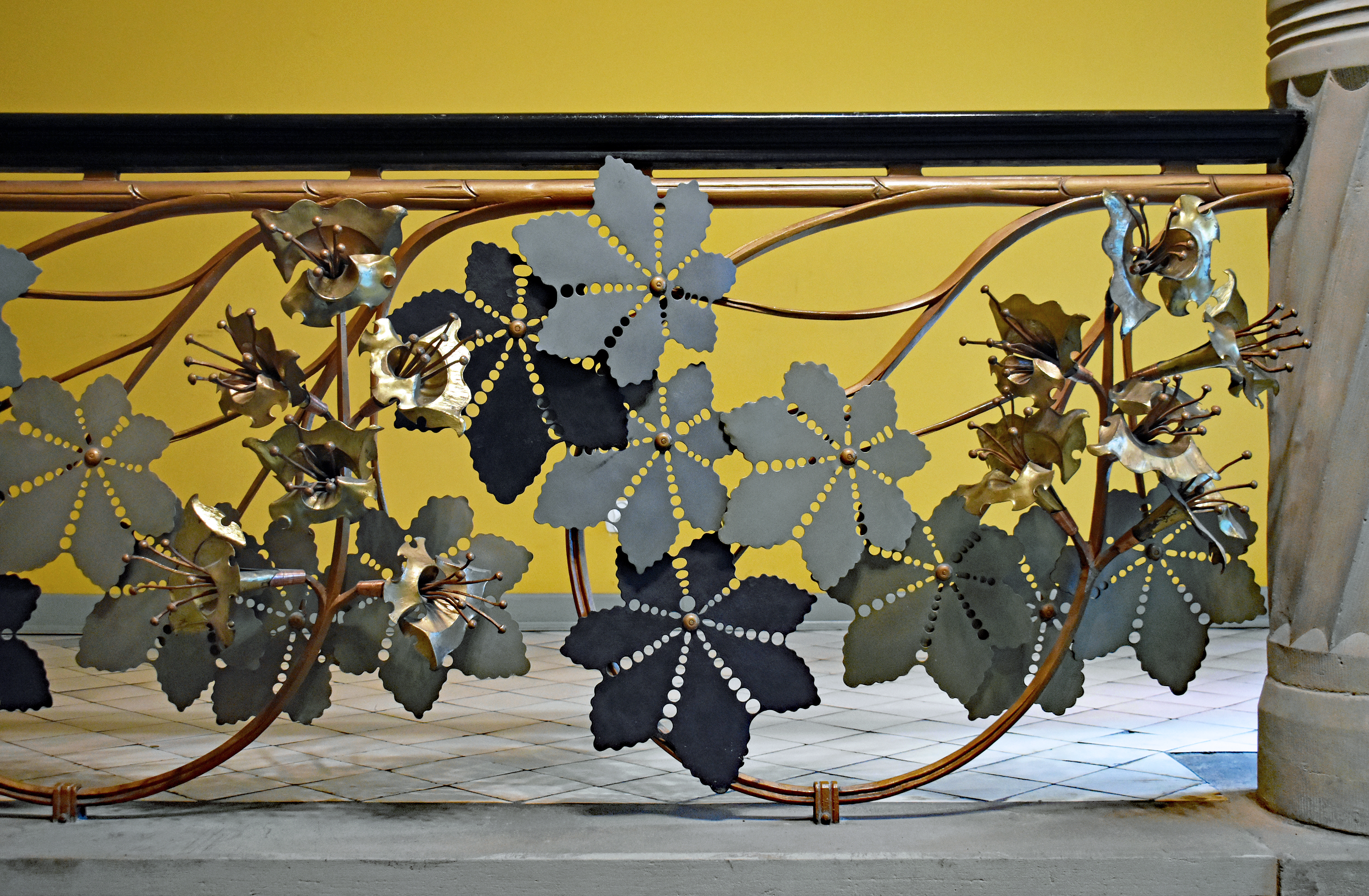
Balustrade detail
Kraków Medical Society House
4 Radziwiłłowska Street, Kraków

== Wyspiański Museum and monuments in his honor ==
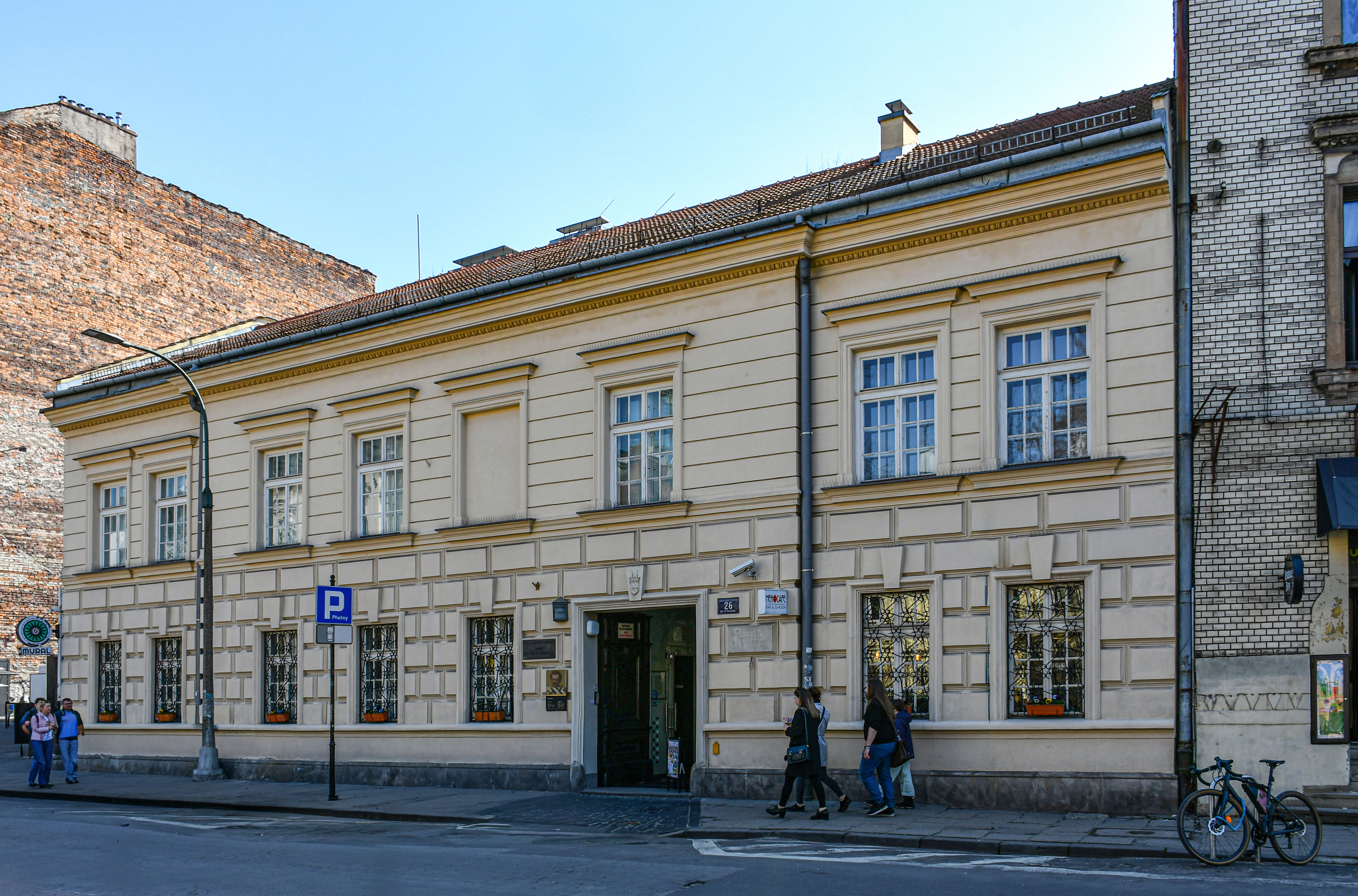
Wyspiański was born here. Józef Mehoffer's House, 26 Krupnicza Street, Kraków, Poland

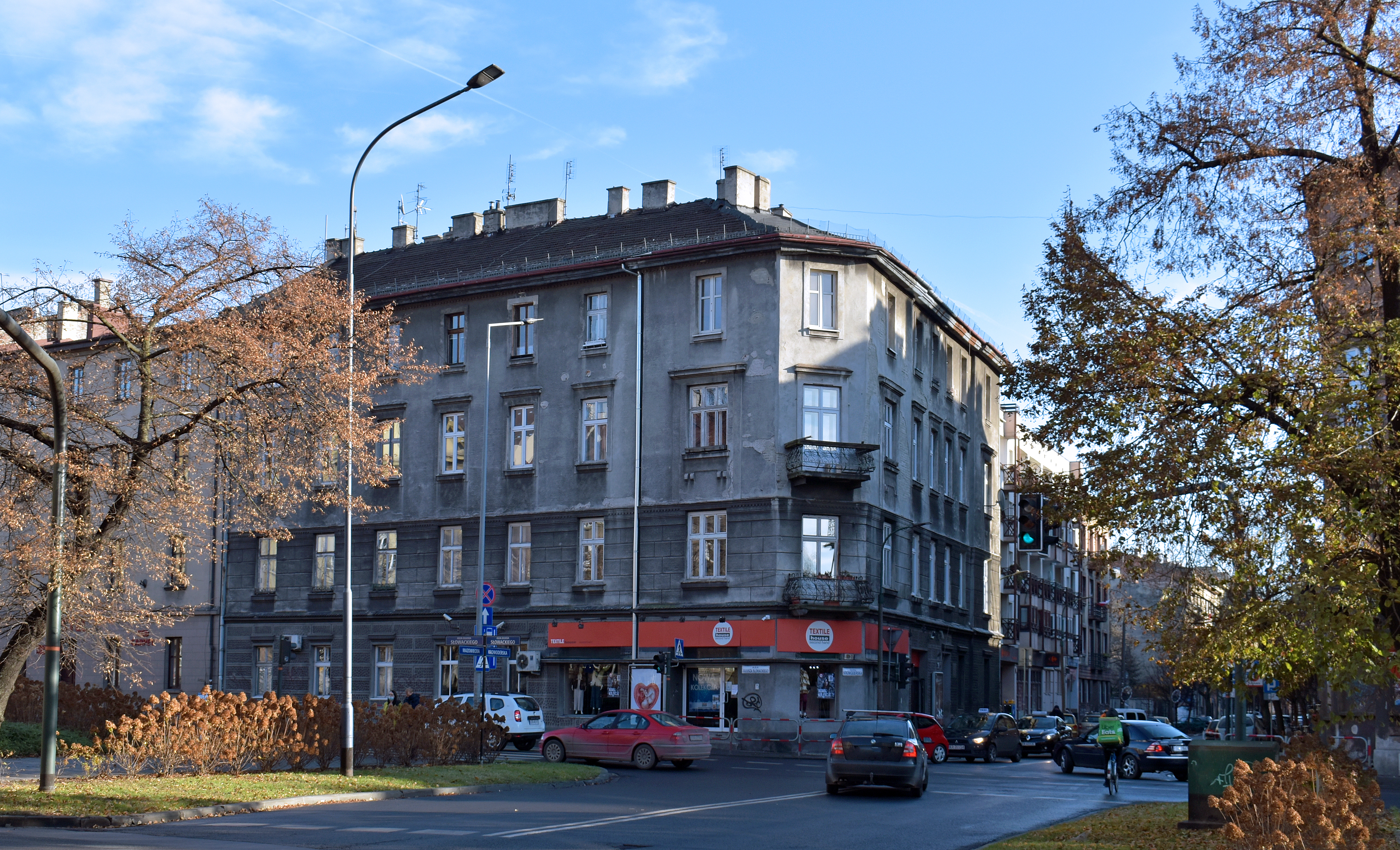
He had a "sapphire studio" at 79 Krowoderska Street, Kraków, Poland

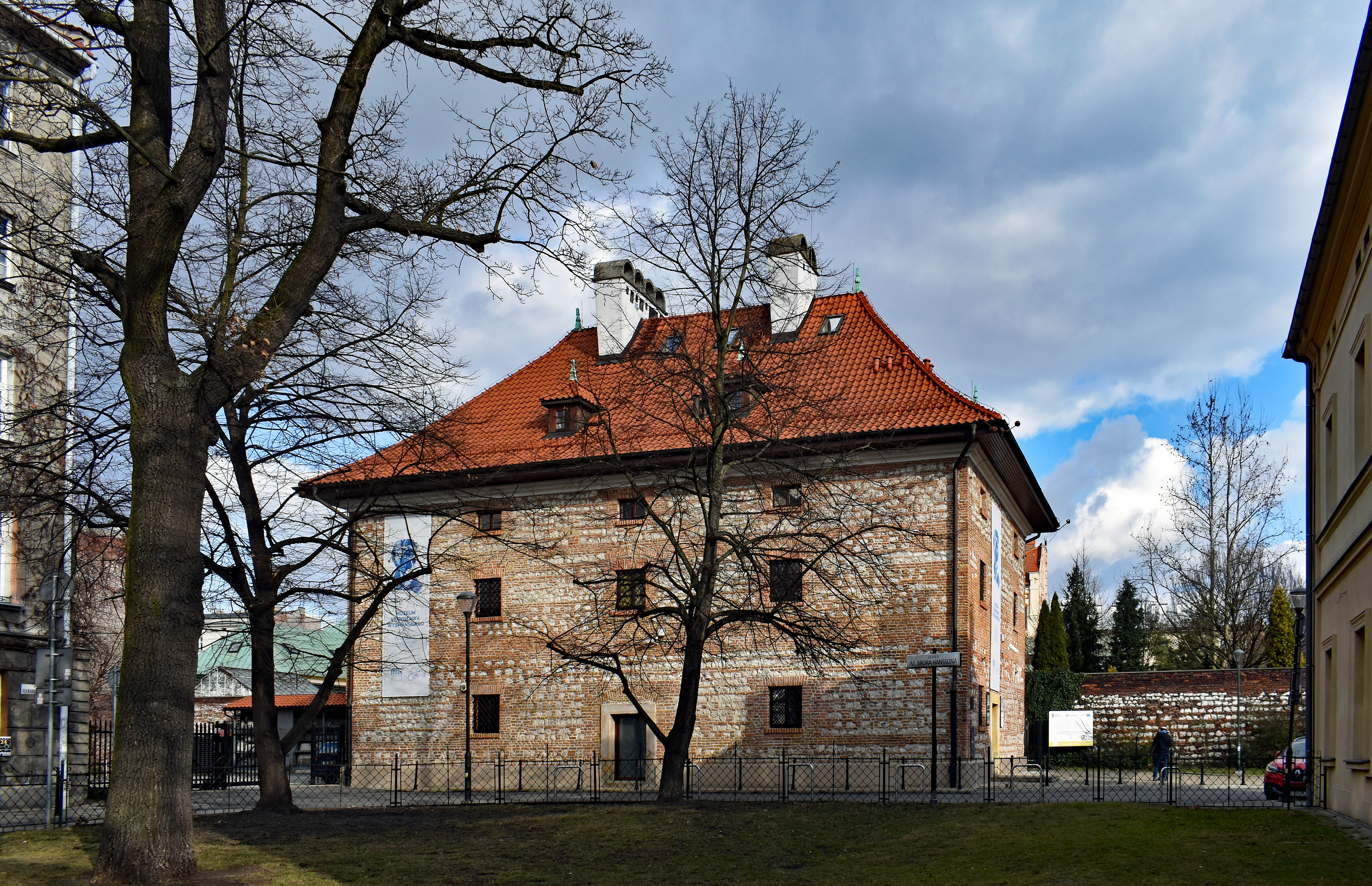
Stanisław Wyspiański Museum 6 W. Sikorski Square, Kraków

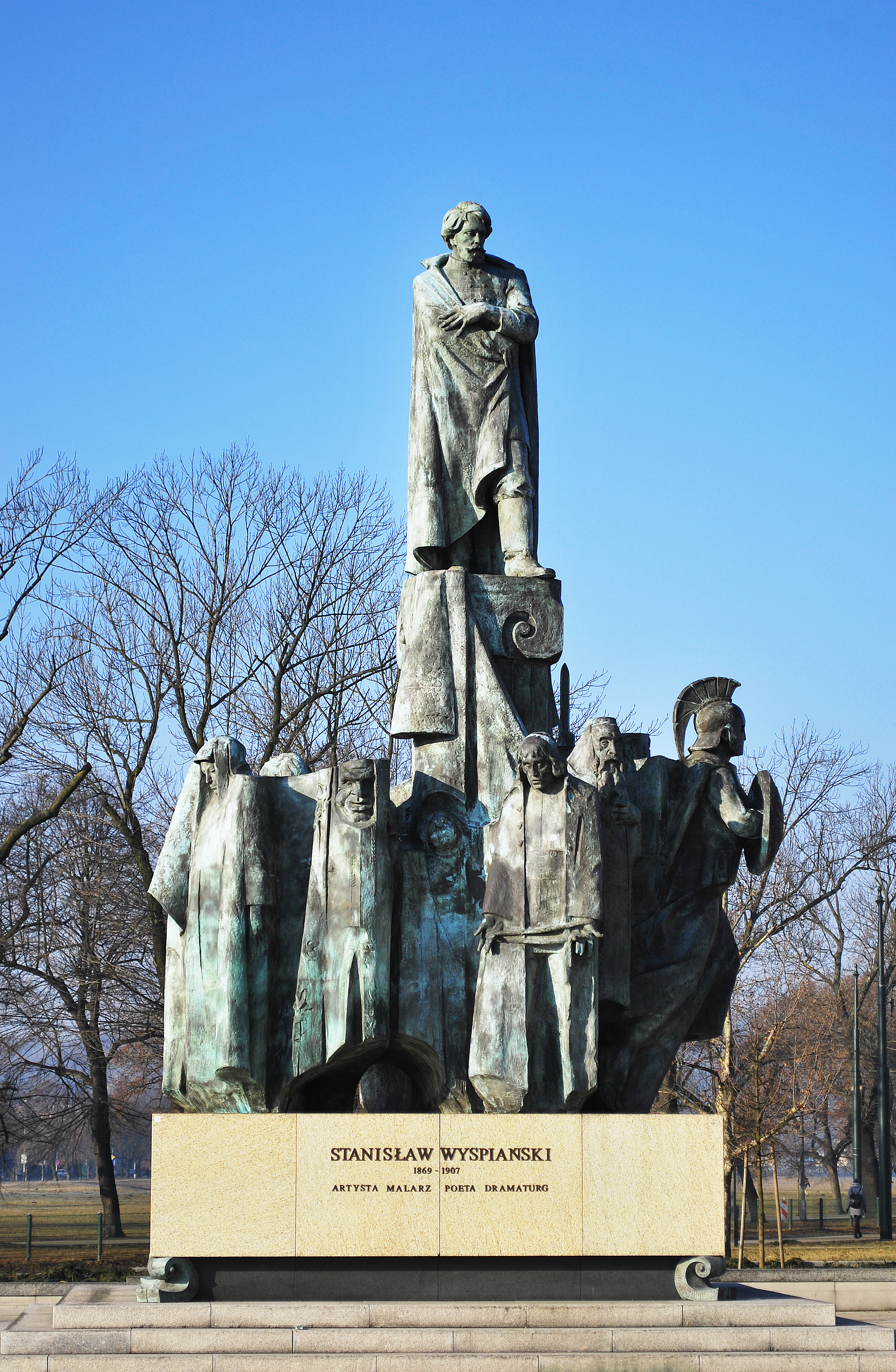
Stanisław Wyspiański monument, Kraków

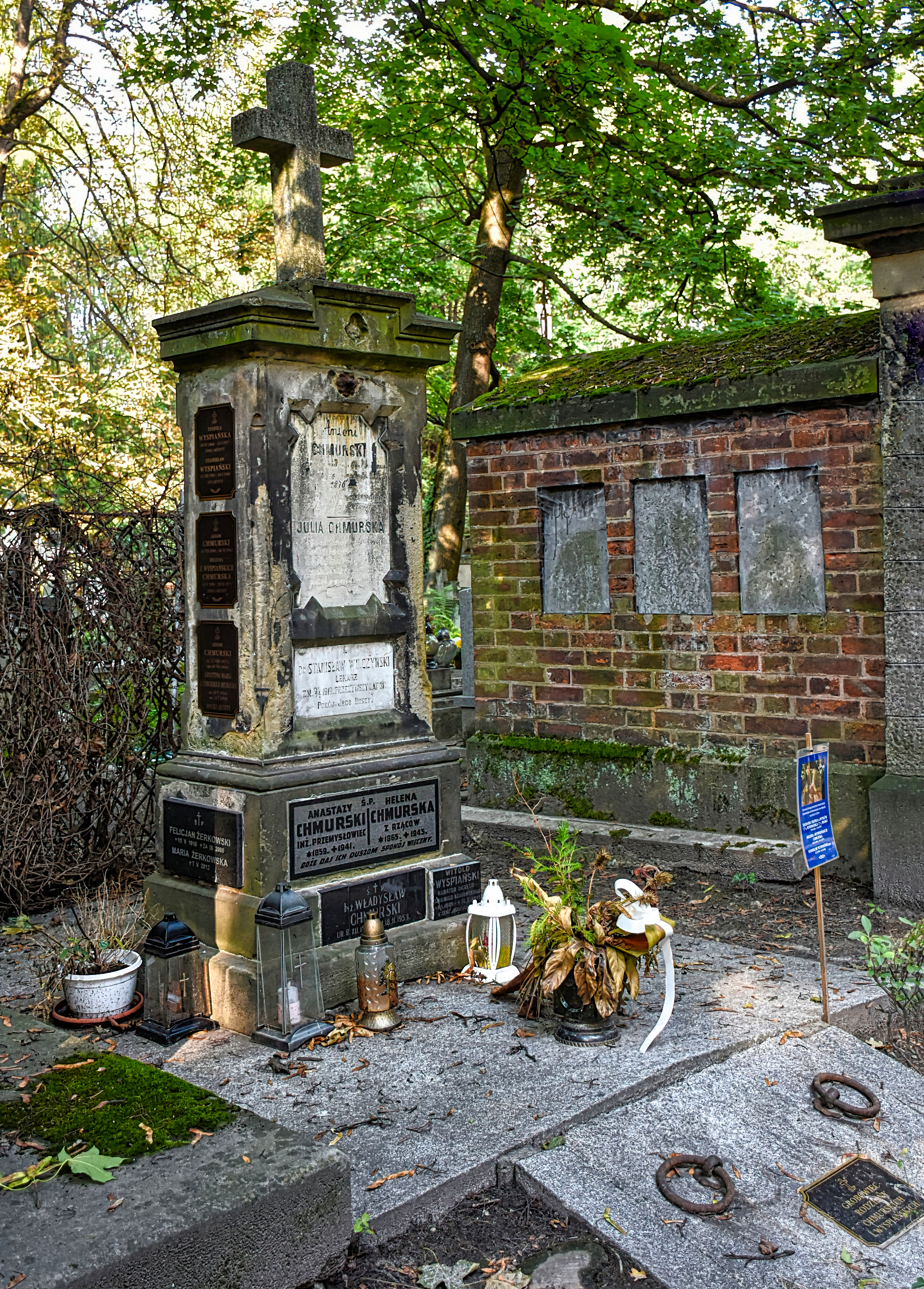
The grave of Wyspiański's wife, son and daughter. Rakowicki Cemetery, 26 Rakowicka Street, Kraków

At the beginning the Stanisław Wyspiański Museum in Kraków was located in the Szołayski tenement house built in the 17th century. Since 2021, the Old Granary has housed the Stanisław Wyspiański Museum. It is a new division of the National Museum in Kraków, sometimes referred to as the NMK Wyspiański. The museum holds the largest collection of Stanisław Wyspiański's works in Poland, including 1 100 objects.

At All Saints' Square, the Wyspiański 2000 Information Exhibition Pavilion is a rare example of contemporary architecture in the Old Town, featuring three of Wyspiański's stained glass windows.

In 1996 a plaque for Stanisław Wyspiański was unveiled at Hotel Nordbahn (since 2008 Austria Classic Hotel Wien) at Praterstraße 72 in Vienna's Leopoldstadt, commemorating the 50th anniversary of the Österreichisch-Polnische Gesellschaft (Austrian-Polish Society) and Wyspiański's frequents stays at the hotel, where among other things he wrote his German dramatic fragment "Weimar 1829" in summer 1904.

In front of the new National Museum building in Kraków on 3-go Maja Street there is a monument to Stanisław Wyspiański. 2007 was named the Year of Stanisław Wyspiański by the Polish Sejm.

== Kraków streets associated with Wyspiański ==
- 26 Krupnicza Street: Wyspiański was born at 26 Krupnicza Street in Kraków, in a house that belonged to his grandparents. He lived there until 1873.
- 25 Kanonicza Street: In the summer of 1873 Wyspianski's family moved to the house of Jan Długosz. Wyspiański's younger brother and mother died there. In the autumn of 1880 Wyspiański moved into the house of his uncle and aunt.
- 1 Kopernika Street: Between 1880 and 1883 he lived in the house of the Stankiewicz family, site of the later PTTK Tourist House and the present Wyspiański Hotel.
- 2 Zacisze Street: There was the Stankiewicz family's new apartment. It was on the second floor of the now non-extant Central Hotel at the junction of Zacisze and Basztowa streets, with a view onto the Barbakan and the Planty Park. Because of the hotel's expansion, the Stankiewicz family was forced to move out in 1885.
- 1 Westerplatte Street (then Kolejowa Street): In July 1895 the Stankiewicz family began living there in an apartment on the ground floor at the corner of Kolejowa and Lubicz streets. Currently at this site there are arcades and stairs to an underground passage. At the time Wyspiański had his studio in the nearby village of Grzegórzki, where he worked on stained glass window designs for the Franciscan Church.
- 10 Poselska Street: After a few months at Westerplatte Street, Wyspiański's uncle died and Wyspiański and his aunt went to live at 10 Poselska Street in a second-floor apartment.
- 9 Mariacki Square: In July 1898 Wyspiański rented a room at the junction of 9 Mariacki Square and 4 Rynek Główny. In 1907 the house was taken down and replaced by an Art Nouveau tenement block. The flat was used as a studio. Wyspiański at the time was registered at 23 Szlak Street in the house of his future wife, Teofilia Pytko.
- 79 Krowoderska Street: In 1901 Stanisław Wyspiański received an award from the Academy of Learning for his stained-glass windows for Wawel Royal Castle. This enabled him to rent a seven-room apartment at 79 Krowoderska Street, on the second floor, at the corner of Juliusza Słowackiego Avenue. He lived there with his family and also had a "sapphire studio" there. Allegedly there was a sign on his door: "Here lives Stanisław Wyspiański, who does not wish to be visited."
- Węgrzce near Kraków: After another prize for landscapes depicting the Kościuszko Mound awarded by the Academy of Learning, Wyspiański moved to his own house in the village of Węgrzce (nb 5). The house, now demolished, has been replaced by another private residence. There is a stone at the site with a commemorative plaque erected on the 100th anniversary of the artist's birth.
- 1 Siemiradzkiego Street:The hospital where Wyspiański died on 28 November 1907 still exists, although it operates now as a maternity hospital. It is situated on the corner of Siemiradzkiego and Łobzowska streets.

== See also ==
- List of Polish language authors
- List of Polish language poets
- List of Polish painters
- List of Polish people (visual arts)
- National Museum, Kraków
- Young Poland

== Bibliography ==
=== English Literature ===
- Zimmer, Szczepan K. (1959) Stanisław Wyspiański, Biographical Sketch, translated by Helena Maria Zimmer

=== Polish Literature ===
- Brodnicki, W. (1970) Między niebem a piekłem. Łódź: Wydawnictwo Łódzkie.
- Kępiński, Z. (1984) Stanisław Wyspiański. Warsaw: Literatura.
- Nelken, H. (1959) Stanisław Wyspiański. Warsaw: Wydawnictwo Arkady
- Skoczylas, L. (1972) Stanisław Wyspiański – życie i twórczość. Cracow: Książnica Powszechna.

=== German Literature ===
- Taborski, Roman (1996) Stanisław Wyspiański – der große Schöpfer der polnischen Moderne : anläßlich der Enthüllung der Wyspiański gewidmeten Gedenktafel in Wien (Ed.: Edward Hałoń) . Vienna: Zentrum für Verbreitung d. Wiss. d. Poln. Akad. d. Wiss.
