= List of Wings Over Jordan Choir personnel =

The following is a list of personnel—conductors, singers, soloists and board members—involved with the a capella African-American spiritual–centered Wings Over Jordan Choir from its 1935 founding as the Gethesame Baptist Choir in Cleveland, Ohio, until 1978. (Note: The 1978 date of Frank Everett's departure as conductor is attributed to records and notes of the choir kept by historian Samuel Barber. Since no one replaced Everett, it can also be regarded as the year the choir disbanded.)

== Conductors ==
Conductors and directors for the Wings Over Jordan Choir include:

- James E. Tate (1935–38), director of the Gethesame Baptist Choir through their radio debut on WGAR radio and national pickup by CBS
- Worth Kramer (1938–41), program director of WGAR, arranged and published much of the choir's repertoire, directed their 1941 Columbia Masterworks album
- Willette Firmbanks Thompson (1935–41), pianist, assistant director under both Tate and Kramer, believed to be the first female director of a nationally known choir
- Frederick D. Hall (1941–42), interim conductor, professor at Alabama State College
- Gladys Olga Jones (1942), New Orleans native and Dillard University graduate who trained under Fredrick D. Hall
- Joseph S. Powe (1942–43), conductor until leaving to join the United States Navy
- Hattye Easley (1943–46), who also was a soloist; conducted the choir during their 1945–46 USO tour in Europe
- Maurice Goldman (1944–45), shared duties with Hattye Easley and the choir's second white director after Worth Kramer
- James Lewis Elkins (1946–47), led the choir through the initial part of their postwar tour and recognized by the New York Philharmonic as a guest conductor
- Charles E. King (1946–47), later a director of the "Wings Over Hollywood" choir and the Cleveland-based "Kingdom Choir"
- Gilbert F. Allen (1947–49), final conductor for the choir's CBS program, directed their RCA Victor records including "Amen"
- Frank Everett (1949–78), conductor for the choir's "second generation" that continued performing after Rev. Settle's 1995 retirement and 1967 death
- Kenneth Brown Billups (1950–57), conductor for the Legend Singers of St. Louis, which was designated as a satellite unit of Wings by Rev. Settle
- Clarence H. Brooks (1950–64), conductor for the East Coast satellite unit of Wings

== Singers and soloists ==
The following is a list of verified singers and soloists involved with Wings Over Jordan. Because of the total number of singers that were ultimately associated with the choir, either in their original incarnation or the varied satellite units that bore the "Wings Over Jordan Choir" name after 1950, (Note: See Wings Over Jordan Choir § New business model.) a definitive list is almost impossible to compile.

=== Original roster ===
Former members have estimated that the choir originally had a roster of between 40 and 50 members in the summer of 1937, consisting of mostly unmarried men and women, with an age range between 17 and 30. Two 1957 Call and Post articles that covered a 20th anniversary reunion for the original members of Wings Over Jordan Choir listed the following singers:

- Mabel Allen
- Bertha Austin
- Louis Lucas Baker
- Rufus Baker
- Paul Breckenridge
- Robert Bullock
- Ruth Wyatt Burke
- Ralph Caldwell
- Mary R. Carpenter
- Alice Carroll
- Clyde Spearman
- Elizabeth Settle Carter
- Jesse Chaney
- Ezekiel Samuel Dearon
- Hazel Lee Johnson
- Helen Springs Dixon
- Ben Dortch
- Persie Ford
- Gladys Hauser-Bates Goodloe
- Grace Spearman Goodman
- George H. Grant (Note: George H. Grant was an original member of the choir who died on June 9, 1940, from complications related to a stomach ailment.)
- Alice Harper
- Norman Harris
- Neil Harrison
- Cynthia Hayes
- Marvin Hayes
- Leroy Johnson
- William Johnson
- Lucille Jones
- Julia Kelly
- William Kelly
- Walter Malloy
- David Martin
- Lois Waterford Parker
- Fred Parks
- Rev. Henry Payden
- Rev. Earl Preston, Jr.
- Gwendolyn Settle Rates
- Rev. Montgomery Rates
- Lewis Richardson
- Evelyn Freeman Roberts
- Thomas Roberts
- Anne Mae W. Ross
- Glenn Thomas "Buddy" Settle
- Imedla Herring Shaw
- Gene Shell
- Mildred Caslin Simmons
- Martha Spearman
- Helen Springs
- Olive Thompson
- Williette Firmbanks Thompson
- Hazel Morris Warner
- Cleva Webster (Note: While Cleva was not noted in the 1957 Call and Post article listing the choir's original members, her obituary and additional interviews have noted her involvement in this period, thus she is included.)

=== 1942 partial roster ===
The following 11 singers were identified in an October 27, 1942, concert review in The Pantagraph out of a roster of 20:

- Emory Barnes
- John Carpenter
- Dorothy Clark
- Cecil Dandy
- Hattie Easley
- Gladys Hauser-Bates Goodloe
- Thomas Hunter
- Esther Overstreet
- Joseph S. Powe
- Clarence Small
- Alice Thompson

=== 1945 USO tour roster ===
Along with Rev. Glenn T. Settle, business manager Mildred Ridley and conductor Hattye Easley, the following singers took part in a ten-month tour in Europe to perform for overseas military personnel on behalf of the USO:

- Sylvia Avery
- John Carpenter
- Rheda Chatman
- Dorothy Clarke
- Cecil Dandy
- Ezekiel Dearon
- Cynthia Groverly
- Marvin Hayes
- Mildred Hunter
- Myrtle Jones
- William Peoples
- Rell Pierce
- George Rates
- Kenneth Slaughter
- Sherman Sneed
- Eugene Strider
- Ellison White

=== 1950 roster ===
The following singers were listed as members in a 1950 promotional booklet:

- Sylvia Avery
- Charles T. Blackburn
- Ernest C. Bledsoe
- Robert G. Brown
- Joseph M. Cabiness
- Walter T. Clark
- Orlando Donan
- Ruth Fomby
- Eddie Givens, Jr.
- DuWayne Griffin
- Helen Hallums
- Gerald L. Hutton
- Amie Lee Johnson
- Samuel R. Johnson
- Pattie Jean Moore
- Gussie Mae Southall
- Olive Thompson

=== 1951 West Coast roster ===
The following singers were listed in a September 27, 1951, concert conducted by Frank Everett, who primarily headed the choir's West Coast "satellite unit":

- Thomas Brown
- Walter T. Clark
- Delores Cordell
- Neil Harrison
- Lorraine Jeffries
- Barbara Mills
- Christine Schooler
- Travestine Underwood
- Leslie Wells

=== 1955 East Coast roster ===
These singers were listed in an October 3, 1955, concert conducted by Clarence H. Brooks, who headed the East Coast-based group:

- Clarence H. Brooks
- Edna Mae Brooks
- Adell Emerson
- James Green
- Billye Mathews
- Clementine Patrick
- Alvin Washington
- Bobbie Williams

=== Additional singers ===
The following are additional members of the choir in any incarnation that have been cited and verified elsewhere:

- Sarah Alexander
- Marian Anderson
- Rev. Paschal R. Banks
- Vivian Bradford
- Samuel Brooks, father of actor Avery Brooks
- Dorothy Farmer
- Web Fleming
- Elizabeth James
- Oscar Lindsay
- Steffan Long
- Albert Meadows
- George McCants
- Hazel Morris
- Rev. John H. Ogletree
- Rosemae Ogletree
- William Peebles
- Mildred Pollard
- Herb Reed, later with The Platters
- Leonard Robinson
- Yvonne Ross
- Pinkey Scott
- Mary Carter Settle
- Helen Springs
- Esther Sweet
- Ronald Townson, later with The 5th Dimension
- Edward M. Turner
- Virginia Wright

== Board of trustees ==
The following people were listed as members of the Wings Over Jordan Choir's board of trustees in December 1943:

- Rev. Glenn T. Settle, Wings Over Jordan Choir founder and director
- Senator Harold H. Burton (R-OH), former mayor of Cleveland
- Rev. Charles H. Crable, president of the Ohio Baptist General Assembly
- Attorney Jules Eshmer, of law firm Davies and Eshner
- Dr. David V. Jemison, president of the National Baptist Convention
- Worth Kramer, general manager of WGKV radio
- Lawrence O. Payne, Cleveland councilman and Call and Post co-publisher

== Bibliography ==
- Harrell, Babette Reid (2019). "Preserving the Negro Spiritual: A Case Study of Wings Over Jordan Celebration Chorus" (PDF). College of Fine Arts. Boston University. Archived (PDF) from the original on December 11, 2021 – via TeachingCleveland.org.
- McGee, Isaiah R. (2007). "The Origin and Historical Development of Prominent Professional Black Choirs in the United States" (PDF). College of Music. Florida State University. Archived (PDF) from the original on December 11, 2021 – via FSU Digital Library.
- McNeil, W. K., ed. (2013). Encyclopedia of American Gospel Music. New York: Taylor & Francis Group. ISBN 978-0-415-94179-2. LCCN 2005044994. Archived from the original on December 9, 2021 – via Google Books.
- Price, Madalin Olivia Trigg (1995). "Wings Over Jordan and American Radio: 1937-1947". Mass Communication and Journalism. University of Southern Mississippi. ProQuest 304215552. Archived from the original on December 13, 2021.
- In re Applications of G.A. Richards, transferor, and Harry J. Klinger, Lawrence P. Fisher and John H. Hannah, transferees, for consent to the transfer of control of KMPC, the Station of the Stars, Inc., Los Angeles, Calif., Docket No. 9402, WJR, the Goodwill Station, Inc., Detroit, Michigan, Docket No. 9403 [and] WGAR Broadcasting Company, Cleveland, Ohio, Docket No. 9404. For renewal of license of Radio Stations KMPC, the Station of the Stars, Inc. ... Docket No. 9468, File No. BR-18, WJR, the Goodwill Station, Inc. ... Docket No. 9469, File No. BR-331 [and] WGAR Broadcasting Company ... Docket No. 9405, File No. BR-283: Exhibits of the WGAR Broadcasting Company (PDF). Vol. 1. Washington, D.C.: Fulton, Walter & Halley. 1948. Archived (PDF) from the original on September 29, 2021 – via World Radio History.
