= Wings Over Jordan Choir =

Former African-American spiritual choir

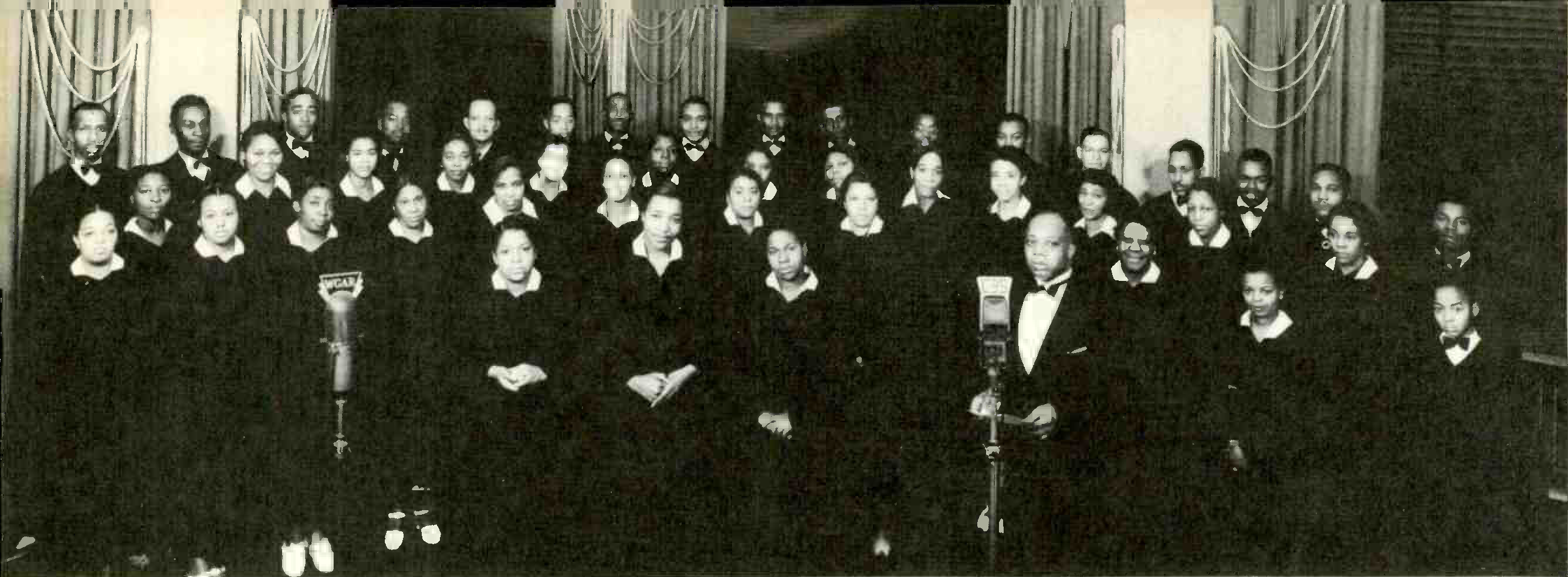
- 1939 publicity photo of the Wings Over Jordan Choir. The Rev. Glenn Thomas Settle is standing at front right, with "WGAR" and "CBS" microphones at opposite ends.

Background information
- Also known as: The Negro Hour Choir
- Origin: Cleveland, Ohio, United States
- Genres: Spirituals
- Instrument: A capella
- Years active: 1935–1978 (Note: The 1978 date of Frank Everett's departure as conductor is attributed to records and notes of the choir kept by historian Samuel Barber. Since no one replaced Everett, it can also be regarded as the year the choir disbanded.)
- Labels: Columbia Masterworks; King/Queen; RCA Victor
- Past members: See list of personnel

Wings Over Jordan
- Other names: The Negro Hour
- Genre: Spirituals
- Running time: 25 minutes
- Country of origin: United States
- Language: English
- Home station: WGAR, Cleveland, Ohio
- Syndicates: CBS (1938–1947); Mutual (1949)
- Starring: Wings Over Jordan Choir
- Announcer: Wayne Mack (all WGAR-produced episodes)
- Created by: Glenn Thomas Settle (Note: Newspaper stories sometimes spelled Settle's first name "Glen" or last name "Settles"; Settle legally changed his first name to Glynn in 1946.); Worth Hollis Kramer
- Recording studio: Hotel Statler (WGAR main studio); CBS and Mutual affiliates
- Other studios: Euclid Avenue Baptist Church, Cleveland, Ohio (summer 1941)
- Original release: July 11, 1937 – December 25, 1949 (Note: The exact end date of the program is unclear. It is believed to have been cancelled at the end of 1949, since the Treasury sponsorship may have been for only one year. The December 1949 issue of Radio Mirror lists Wings Over Jordan at 9:30 a.m. on its Mutual schedule; the January 1950 issue lists Dixie Quartet in that time slot, with no reference to Wings.)
- No. of episodes: 26 on WGAR; 509 on CBS; 52 on Mutual
- Audio format: Monaural sound
- Opening theme: "Go Down Moses"
- Sponsored by: Sustaining program (1938–1947); Treasury Department (1949)

The Wings Over Jordan Choir was an African-American a cappella spiritual choir founded and based in Cleveland, Ohio. The choir was part of the weekly religious radio series, Wings Over Jordan, created to showcase the group.

Debuting over Cleveland radio station WGAR in 1937 as The Negro Hour, the radio program was broadcast on the Columbia Broadcasting System from 1938 to 1947 and the Mutual Broadcasting System through 1949. Wings Over Jordan broke the color barrier as the first radio program produced and hosted by African-Americans to be nationally broadcast over a network. The program was the first of its kind which was easily accessible to audiences in the Deep South, featuring distinguished black church and civic leaders, scholars and artists as guest speakers. One of the highest-rated religious radio programs in the United States, it also had an international shortwave audience on the British Broadcasting Corporation (BBC), the Voice of America (VOA), and Armed Forces Radio. The program has been credited with WGAR and CBS receiving inaugural Peabody Awards in 1941.

Founded in Cleveland by Baptist minister Glynn Thomas Settle (1894–1967), the choir performed concerts throughout the country during its height (often defying Jim Crow laws) and toured with the USO in support of the American war effort during World War II and the Korean War. Billed as one of the world's greatest Negro choirs, the Wings Over Jordan Choir is regarded as a forerunner of the civil rights movement and a driving force in the development of choral music helping to both preserve by introducing traditional spirituals to a mainstream audience. Other versions of the group began to emerge during the 1950s, and a Cleveland-based tribute choir of the same name has performed since 1988.

== History ==
=== 1935–1938: Formation ===
==== Cleveland origins ====
Members of the "Wings Over Jordan" choir, prior to the organization of the group, were mainly members of the Gethsemane Church choir. Few of the vocalists have had any formal musical training. Men in the group were house painters, garage attendants, chauffeurs, WPA workers and elevator operators, while women were employed as maids, cooks and seamstresses.

— The Call and Post, April 12, 1941

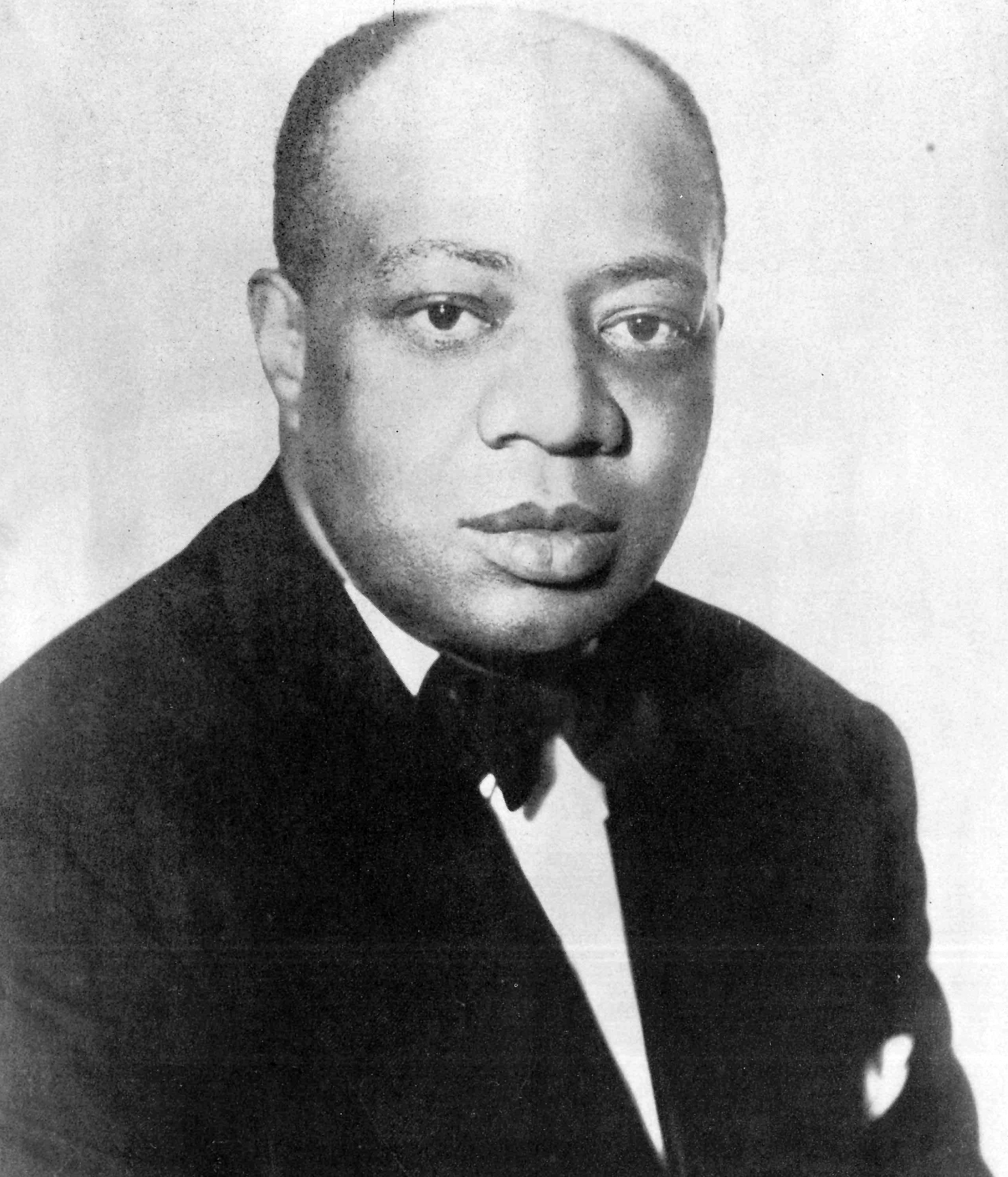
Rev. Glenn Thomas Settle

Wings Over Jordan originated as a choir at Gethsemane Baptist Church in Cleveland's Central neighborhood under the direction of Rev. Glenn Thomas Settle. Born in Reidsville, North Carolina, in 1894 to sharecroppers Ruben and Mary B. Settle as one of nine children, Settle's paternal grandfather Tom Settle was an African prince who was captured and sold into slavery during the 1850s; his maternal grandfather was a member of the Cherokee Nation. The Settle family moved to Uniontown, Pennsylvania, in 1902, where Glenn became involved in local churches and worked up to three jobs after his father's death. Moving to Cleveland in 1917 with his first wife, Mary Elizabeth Carter, Settle studied at the Moody Bible Institute after being inspired to improve his education; he took classes in the evening and worked as a metallurgist in a foundry during the day. Before his ordination, Settle led a church in Painesville and was assigned to a Baptist church in Elyria which split into two congregations in 1933. In Elyria, Settle became known for sermons advocating social justice and the easing of racial tensions. He became Gethsemane's pastor in November 1935 as the church was in the middle of a fiscal crisis, leading its return to a "very healthy" financial state. In addition to leading Gethsemane, Settle was a clerk in Cleveland's street department.

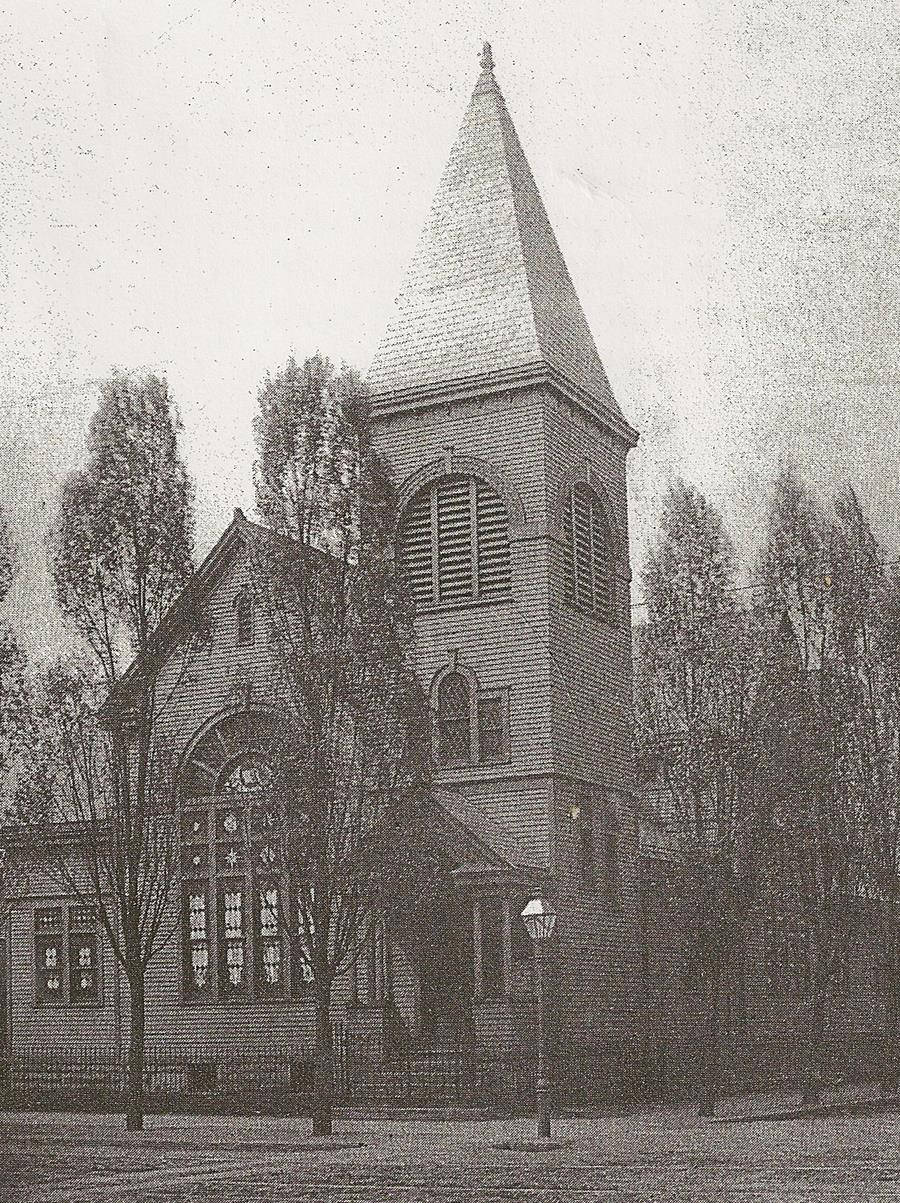
Gethsemane Baptist Church

Like Settle, most of Gethsemane's congregation were migrant families from the South. Although it was not one of the city's more prominent churches, it had a choir of rich, natural, untrained voices. The singers included laborers, maids, beauticians and elevator operators. Gethsemane had no music ministry, and Settle established an a cappella choir with his singers and singers from other choirs and Cleveland's Central High School (which much of the congregation had attended). James E. Tate, who had become involved with Gethsemane when Settle was appointed pastor, was appointed director. The choir's repertoire of spirituals documented the African-American psyche during their enslavement and, after falling out of favor among Blacks following emancipation, experienced a resurgence in popularity during the Great Depression. Settle saw spirituals as a dignified art form and sought to preserve their authenticity with the choir; performances often had a deeply-emotional atmosphere, reflecting his work as a minister. Although they were regarded as "sorrow songs", spirituals also held hope for a better Black future; choir members were comforted by singing their ancestors' songs, which helped them overcome feelings of hopelessness. Settle's granddaughter Teretha Settle Overton later compared spirituals to gospel songs, calling the former songs of woe and saying that the latter proclaim salvation and redemption. The choir quickly became popular in Cleveland, with concert bookings throughout the city and an early-1937 regional tour which included Settle's hometown of Uniontown.

==== WGAR's The Negro Hour ====
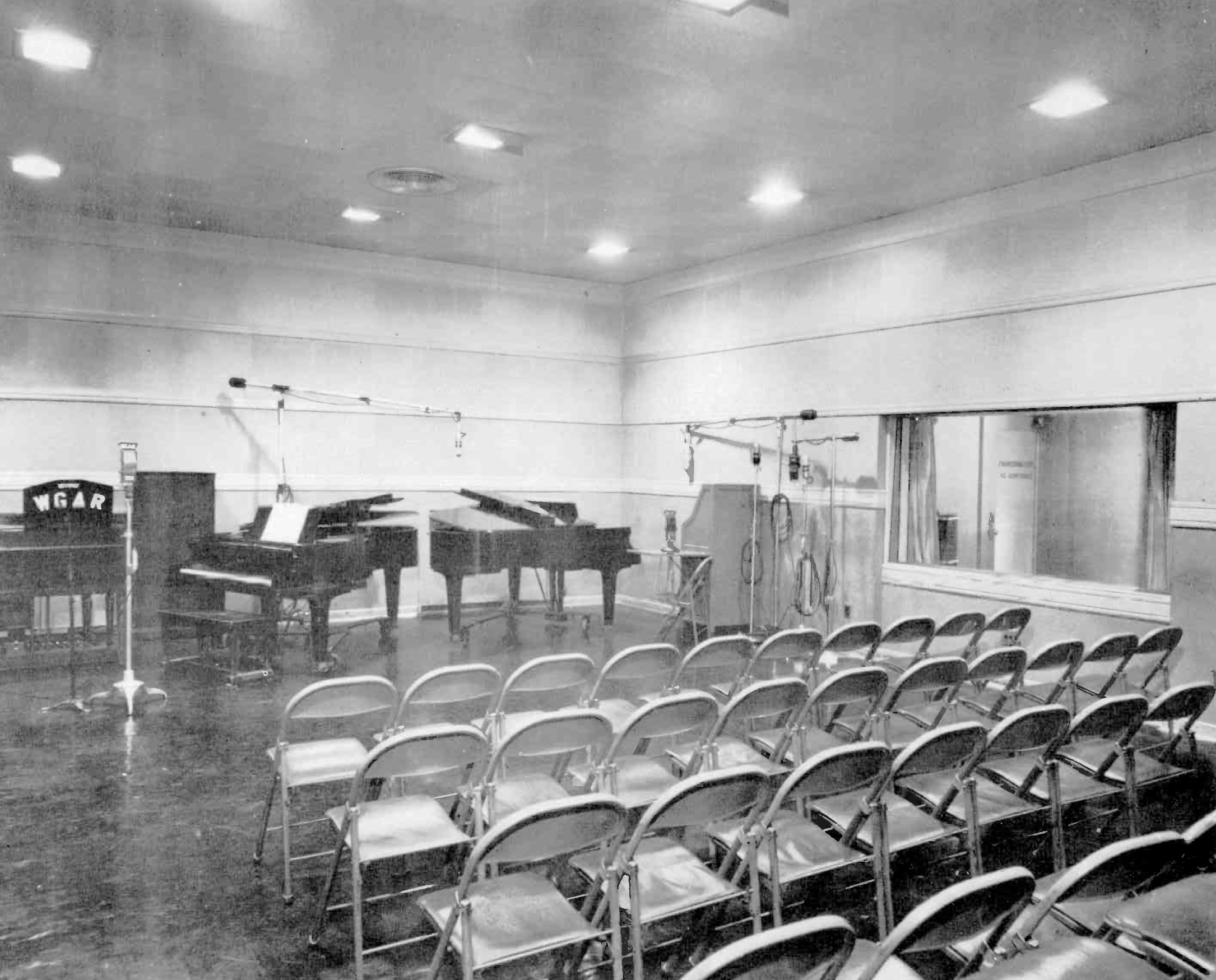
WGAR studio A at the Hotel Statler, where many episodes of Wings Over Jordan were produced

After consulting a colleague at Cleveland's street department who was an ethnic radio broadcaster, Settle entered the choir in an on-air amateur contest hosted by Cleveland station WJAY. (Note: Then under common ownership with WHK, the station was renamed WCLE later in 1937 and relocated to Akron in 1944 as WHKK.) The choir was ruled ineligible; the station considered them professional artists, but WGAR program director Worth Kramer was in the audience. After the WJAY audition and learning about Kramer's position, Settle approached him with a request to add a weekly show aimed at the African-American population to WGAR's Sunday ethnic lineup. An affiliate of NBC's Blue Network, (Note: WGAR also carried Mutual Broadcasting System programs at this time. In 1937, Cleveland had only four radio stations: WGAR, CBS affiliate WHK, NBC Red-owned WTAM, and independent daytimer WJAY.) WGAR recently removed a Sunday-morning Blue Network program with the Southernaires from their schedule after a local group purchased the time slot and, despite a variety of programs for European ethnic groups, had nothing for Cleveland's Black population. Kramer was so impressed by the choir's subsequent audition that he promptly launched The Negro Hour on July 11, 1937, for which Settle's choir provided the music.

In addition to the choir's musical performances, The Negro Hour featured guests who would talk about issues facing Blacks; the first program's guests were Rev. H. C. Bailey and Cleveland mayor Harold Hitz Burton. The first known radio program autonomously produced and directed by African-Americans, it is also considered the first program to feature Black people in ways which were not demeaning burlesque. Kramer became an early supporter of the choir after becoming interested in spirituals; he researched their origins, and considered them "the only true form of early American music". Settle and the choir—now known as The Negro Hour Choir—were featured performers at the Ohio Baptist General Association's 1937 conference, which WGAR broadcast live. James E. Tate received $450 from Gethsemane's congregation for his planned studies at Oberlin College after Settle praised his "natural ability ... to train and direct singing groups".

==== Going national on CBS ====
My only knowledge of Dr. Suttle (sic) is derived from his relation to (Wings Over Jordan). I am thoroughly convinced, however, that he is a man of sound intelligence, deep seated piety and of earnest consecration and devotion to the welfare of his race. His conduct of the Sunday morning program is characterized by a reverent and devout spirit which is deeper than the requirement of a broadcast program ... Of all the Sunday morning broadcast which bombarded the throne of Heaven, none are more intense with spiritual meaning, and power than those conveyed in the jubilee melodies, which sprung out of the soul of unsophisticated black folk.

— Kelly Miller, New York Age, June 25, 1938

On September 26, 1937, WGAR switched affiliation from NBC's Blue Network to the Columbia Broadcasting System (CBS). The success of The Negro Hour caught CBS' attention, particularly that of executive director Sterling Fisher and musical director Davidson Taylor. A special 15-minute prime time slot was given to the choir on November 9, 1937. Entitled Wings Over Jordan, the program featured the Robert Nathaniel Dett song "Keep Me From Sinking Down". The choir received another prime-time slot on December 14, 1937, allowing network executives a chance to hear the choir and perhaps offer a regularly scheduled program. Nashville religious leader Henry Allen Boyd appeared on the December 5, 1937, Negro Hour, the first non-Cleveland guest speaker. CBS picked up the program, renamed Wings Over Jordan, for national distribution on January 9, 1938; it was the first show independently produced and hosted by African Americans to be broadcast nationwide over a radio network.

The choir adopted "Wings Over Jordan" as its permanent name. The name was credited to Settle, who never explained its origin. According to a later Newsweek article, it referred to the African-American Christian belief in crossing the River Jordan at death and hearing the "winged chorus of angels" while completing the journey to the afterlife. Settle's administrative assistant, Alice Harper McCrady, speculated that it sprang from his penchant for analogies in sermons. "Wings Over Jordan" was a metaphor; many spirituals used wings to represent "flying away" from slavery, and "The River of Jordan" and "Deep River" were frequently performed by the choir. A newspaper article about a 1949 concert says that Settle adopted the phrase from the lyrics of a song sung by his mother. Another theory suggests that Settle thought the phrase "had a nice ring to it" when CBS used it for the two prime-time programs. Whatever its origin, the name served Settle and the choir for the next 30 years.

=== 1938–1942: Broad popularity ===
==== Worth Kramer's direction ====
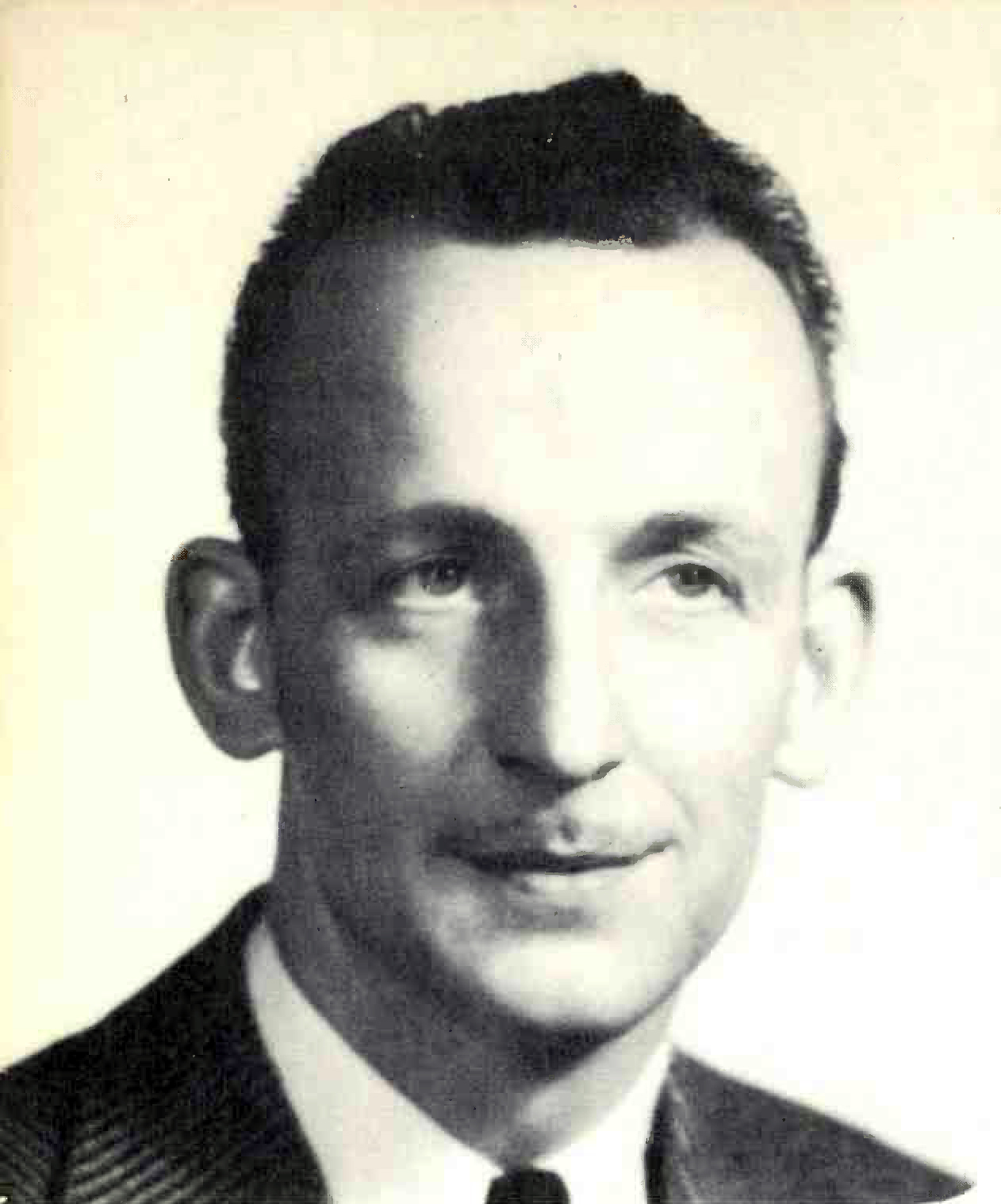
Worth Kramer directed the choir from 1938 to 1942.

When the program went national, Settle replaced James E. Tate as the choir's director with WGAR's Worth Kramer. Settle initially said that Kramer's role would last for four weeks (citing his previous choir experience), but Kramer remained in the position for several more weeks and Tate resigned the following month. Although Tate agreed to return to his former position after discontent was expressed by other members, he left the choir permanently a month later. The director's position was given to Kramer; Williette Firmbanks (Tate's former assistant) became a secondary director, including road performances which Kramer could not attend. Kramer left his position as WGAR program director in 1939 to head an "artists service" department established by the station, allowing him to devote more attention to the choir. His original four-week stint as Wings choir director lasted for four years, and his knowledge of radio production and musical sensitivities set a standard emulated by subsequent conductors.

Choral groups have always been my hobby, and I saw in this group an opportunity to preserve America's finest contribution to the music world—the Negro spiritual.

— Worth Kramer

Despite Settle's insistence that no one would get undue credit for the choir's success, Kramer received disproportionate media coverage and concert promotion; this sparked unrest among the members. A 1940 Time profile on the program said that Kramer "drummed his arrangements into the musically illiterate group by rote ... for weeks before he put them on the air". Kramer, sometimes in collaboration with Firmbanks, composed multiple arrangements for the choir to assist its many members who could not read sheet music proficiently. He defended the choir in a 1941 open letter to swing band leaders demanding that they refrain from appropriating spirituals: "To many of the opposite race, (this) is exceedingly distasteful. Imagine your disgust, in tuning in a late evening dance program, to hear ... the blatant strains of a band "jiving" "All Hail the Power of Jesus' Name" or "The Old Rugged Cross" ... you would run immediately to the telephone to protest such irreverent expression of musical prowess". Historians and family of surviving choir members have seen Kramer as helping them gain legitimacy and the pickup by Columbia; Teretha Overton said, "(he) opened doors that my grandfather could not get in". Some CBS affiliates in the Deep South, however, (including Shreveport, Louisiana's KWKH), advertised the show as "Wings Over Jordan ... the Worth Kramer Choir."

==== Concert tours ====
Wings Over Jordan became CBS's highest-profile sustaining program, with the network agreeing to cover all airtime costs; this removed the need for commercial sponsorship. Although it had an estimated audience of ten million listeners every week and was reportedly one of the most-listened to religious radio programs, sustaining programs were not rated (unlike sponsored programs) and no definite audience measurements exist. It was not uncommon for predominantly-Black neighborhoods in Cleveland to have most of their radios tuned to WGAR on porches or next to open windows, however, so others could listen. The summer of 1938 saw the choir's first significant concert tour. The tour included cities in Kentucky, Tennessee and Alabama, with Settle arranging for choir members to stay in the homes of Black families if the organizations hosting them could not provide lodging. Settle refused to let the choir perform for segregated audiences; they were occasionally jailed for violating Jim Crow laws, prompting them to broadcast from historically black colleges and universities. Worth Kramer's direction has also been credited with the group's obtaining bookings at venues otherwise hostile to Blacks.

If I could hear singing like that every morning, my day would be a lot happier.

— New York City mayor Fiorello La Guardia

During their program's first 18 months on CBS, the choir performed in over 150 concerts throughout the East Coast and Midwest. Although their tours were initially only a few days long, they began receiving fan mail from all over the country by the end of 1938. First Lady Eleanor Roosevelt was one of the choir's most visible supporters, inviting several of its members to a luncheon at the White House on December 5, 1938. This followed three successful engagements in Washington, D.C., and a remote broadcast originating from CBS-owned WJSV, a first for the choir. Roosevelt was cited in the choir's 1940 Newsweek profile as a fan. A June 1, 1939, concert at the Baltimore Armory attracted an audience of over 18,000; it was immediately followed by a recital at Harlem's Abyssinian Baptist Church before a capacity crowd, despite little advance promotion. The choir incorporated as a nonprofit organization in May 1939, with its initial headquarters at Gethsemane Baptist Church. It had moved to the Call and Post building by May 1941, with additional offices in Knoxville, New York City, Los Angeles and Atlanta; at this time, the Call and Post referred to Wings as "...perhaps one of the Nation's largest Negro enterprises."

WGAR executive Maurice Condon originally handled the choir's marketing and management, but Neil Collins was hired as their first promotional director by December 1939. Under Kramer (who became the choir's vice president when it was incorporated), a full-time position became necessary to handle concert requests. Collins visited about 400 radio stations during his 19-month tenure to make arrangements which included lodging in segregated towns. Collins created the choir's first press kits, provided advance publicity and accompanied it on tour, ensuring that all proceeds were distributed appropriately. Collins was white, which gave the choir opportunities for concerts and publicity which would not have otherwise existed; bookings ranged from nearly-empty houses to crowds who refused to leave between concerts, forcing a separate venue to be booked. Collins later referred to it as "a tour of the United States for a young man, expenses paid". Concert tours at this time included daily performances, almost always at a different venue, and up to three concerts per day. A March 1940 visit to New York City included Mayor Fiorello La Guardia giving the choir a key to the city after they performed in his office, telling them: "if I could hear singing like that every morning, my day would be a lot happier". Wings returned to New York City for a performance at the World's Fair that July. The largest recorded attendance for any Wings concert was at Cleveland Municipal Stadium on July 4, 1940, with 75,000 in attendance; 25,000 were turned away. Persie Ford was one of several choir members who continuously participated in Wings throughout this period; according to grandson Glenn A. Brackens, she was on the road for nine years and took a sabbatical in 1942 to focus on her marriage.

==== Guest speakers ====
Many times, particularly during the '30s and '40s, when there were numerous lynchings or killings of African-Americans in the South, these stories were not carried in depth by the white media. A number of the speakers ... (Rev. Settle) would bring them on, and they would use his Sunday-morning broadcasts as an outlet to help let the world know what was happening and the injustices being done in many areas.

— John Foxhall

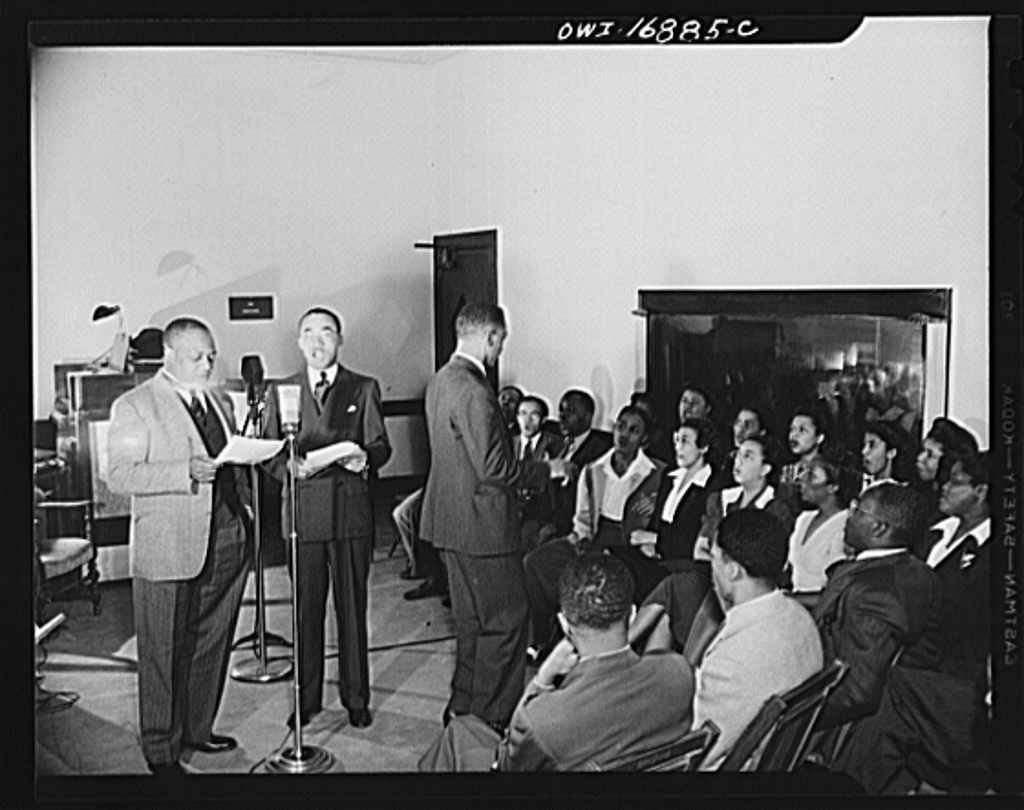
The choir (seated) in a February 1943 broadcast hosted by CBS affiliate WDBO, with guest speaker Bethune–Cookman College president James A. Colston

The guest-speaker segment became a five-minute feature when the program was picked up by CBS in what was called a "round-robin drop" system, allowing speakers to broadcast from Cleveland, New York City, Chicago, Philadelphia, St. Louis or Washington, D.C. Settle's narrations for each program were carefully written and structured to tie in the song selections—which he had typically chosen beforehand—with the guest speakers' material. Ben A. Green, mayor of Mound Bayou, Mississippi, appeared on the April 10, 1938, program to talk about the town's founding by emancipated slaves; Green received a police escort to the WGAR studios, and bestowed a key to the city by Cleveland mayor Harold Burton. Charlotte Hawkins Brown, founder of the Palmer Memorial Institute, presented a March 10, 1940, address entitled "The Negro and the Social Graces". The many guest speakers ranged from local church leaders to celebrities, politicians and distinguished scholars. Hattie McDaniel, the first Black to win an Academy Award for her role in Gone with the Wind, appeared on the July 7, 1940, program. Historian Carter G. Woodson gave a February 5, 1939, speech entitled "The Negro's part in history." Channing H. Tobias, president of the YMCA's New York City chapter, talked about the organization's relationship with Blacks on March 12, 1939. Francis M. Wood, longtime director of Baltimore's Negro schools, appeared on the January 21, 1940, broadcast. E. Washington Rhodes, publisher of The Philadelphia Tribune, delivered "The Fight for Negro Freedom" on September 6, 1942. W. E. B. Du Bois, Charles H. Wesley, Langston Hughes and Mary McLeod Bethune were also credited as guest speakers. (Note: Du Bois, Wesley and Hughes' appearances on the program cannot be easily attributed, and could be apocryphal. Although logs of guest speakers are extant from 1938 to 1942, World War II resulted in short-staffing at CBS and incomplete records afterwards. WGAR's records, if they did exist, are now probably lost due to ownership, facility and callsign changes.) Ohio governor John W. Bricker, Cleveland mayor Harold Burton, New York mayor Fiorello La Guardia and Coca-Cola president George W. Woodruff were the most prominent white guest speakers. Bricker—later honored by the Phillis Wheatley Association—appeared on the program's third CBS anniversary on January 12, 1941; the 45-minute program was broadcast from Cleveland's Antioch Baptist Church, the first network radio program originating from a Black church. La Guardia presented an address for the show's fourth anniversary on January 11, 1942. Advance coordination between La Guardia (who spoke in New York City) and the show's production team in Ohio took place via telegraph; the spiritual "When I've Done The Best I've Can" followed the address at La Guardia's request, who noted the song's themes of "inconsolation and reward for unappreciated labor".

Distinguished Black artists and scholars on the program were revolutionary, breaking the color barrier. For the first time on network radio, Black people were talking substantively about racial inequities, disfranchisement and lynching (typically avoided by white-controlled media). Because Wings Over Jordan was a sustaining program and not dependent on commercial sponsors, the speeches were delivered with little fear of backlash. W. O. Walker's April 12, 1941, Call and Post column noted that Black actress Ethel Waters was the first person of color to host a sponsored (by the American Oil Company) radio show in 1933, but it was cancelled after protests by southern stations. The FCC looked favorably on sustaining programs, however, using them to assess if a broadcaster was operating in the public interest. By capitalizing on the indifference of white owners of CBS affiliates in the Deep South, Wings Over Jordan helped to introduce these issues to a white audience for the first time.

==== International reach ====
The program was broadcast live on Sunday mornings during its CBS run. Initially airing at 9:00 a.m. Eastern Time, its start time was moved to 9:30 a.m. by September 1938 and to 10:30 a.m. on September 17, 1939. Air times for Wings Over Jordan varied seasonally between 9:30 and 10:30 a.m. for the next two years before settling on a 10:30 a.m. start on November 2, 1941, after Church of the Air. Although the 10:30 a.m. start was meant to accommodate listeners on the West Coast (where it aired at 7:30 a.m. Pacific Time), East Coast listeners disliked the conflict with local church services; to diffuse the conflict, Settle suggested that churches broadcast the program as part of their Sunday school curriculum. CBS offered the choir an additional 15-minute weekday program beginning on July 28, 1941. The choir originated the daily broadcasts from Cleveland's Euclid Avenue Baptist Church for six weeks, due to the demand for tickets; the 300-seat church auditorium was much larger than the WGAR studios at the Hotel Statler. The Call and Post called the experimental program "another glorious chapter in (the choir's) unusual success story".

The choir's reach became international in September 1938, when the British Broadcasting Corporation (BBC) picked up the program as part of a goodwill exchange on its shortwave radio service. The program was available to stations in Canada, Mexico, South America, India and elsewhere by 1939, and the choir received congratulatory messages from many of those countries and regions. The international audience was in addition to the CBS affiliate base in the United States, which Time estimated in 1940 at 107 stations. Shortwave station WRUL in Scituate, Massachusetts, transmitted the program to Europe on December 17, 1940, as part of a "Friendship Bridge" between Great Britain and the U.S. This accentuated the BBC's relationship with the choir, since its rebroadcasts of Wings Over Jordan were part of a series about American music appreciation. CBS selected the choir as part of its Columbia School of the Air educational series in 1942, which was broadcast throughout North and South America.

==== Acclaim, records and awards ====
And to the men and women of the "Wings Over Jordan" chorus, I found myself saying over and over again: "that crying, your music. It's crying, way down inside. It's crying thousands of years back. It's crying for a God to lead a puzzled and distressed world of men to higher things and things more of the spirit and less of the material ... And it will come because underneath it all is a foundation, the foundation of a human spirit which some day, sometime, somewhere will prevail over all else."

— Louis B. Seltzer, Cleveland Press editor-in-chief

The New York City-based artist management firm Alber-Zwick Corporation signed the choir to an $85,000 contract (equivalent to $1,860,577 in 2025) in January 1941, taking over its management and bookings; the signing followed weeks of negotiations which delayed publication of the agency's annual "Alber Blue Book of World Celebrities" so the choir could be included. Asked what prompted the agency to sign the choir, Alber-Zwick head Louis Alber cited a January 15, 1941, column by Cleveland Press editor-in-chief Louis B. Seltzer. Seltzer's column, "There Is A Foundation," was an emotional response to a Wings recital at the Hotel Cleveland; he wrote that the choir and its repertoire complemented Arab's laments in William Saroyan's play, The Time of Your Life. Alber, who had managed Will Rogers, Lowell Thomas, Vilhjalmur Stefansson and William Howard Taft, said about Seltzer's column: "if you'll read this, you'll understand ... the world needs what this Negro Chorus has to give as never before in my lifetime. Louis Seltzer has stated it much better than I can." Alber-Zwick's plans for the choir included additional tours on the West Coast, South America and other global ports, and possible film appearances.

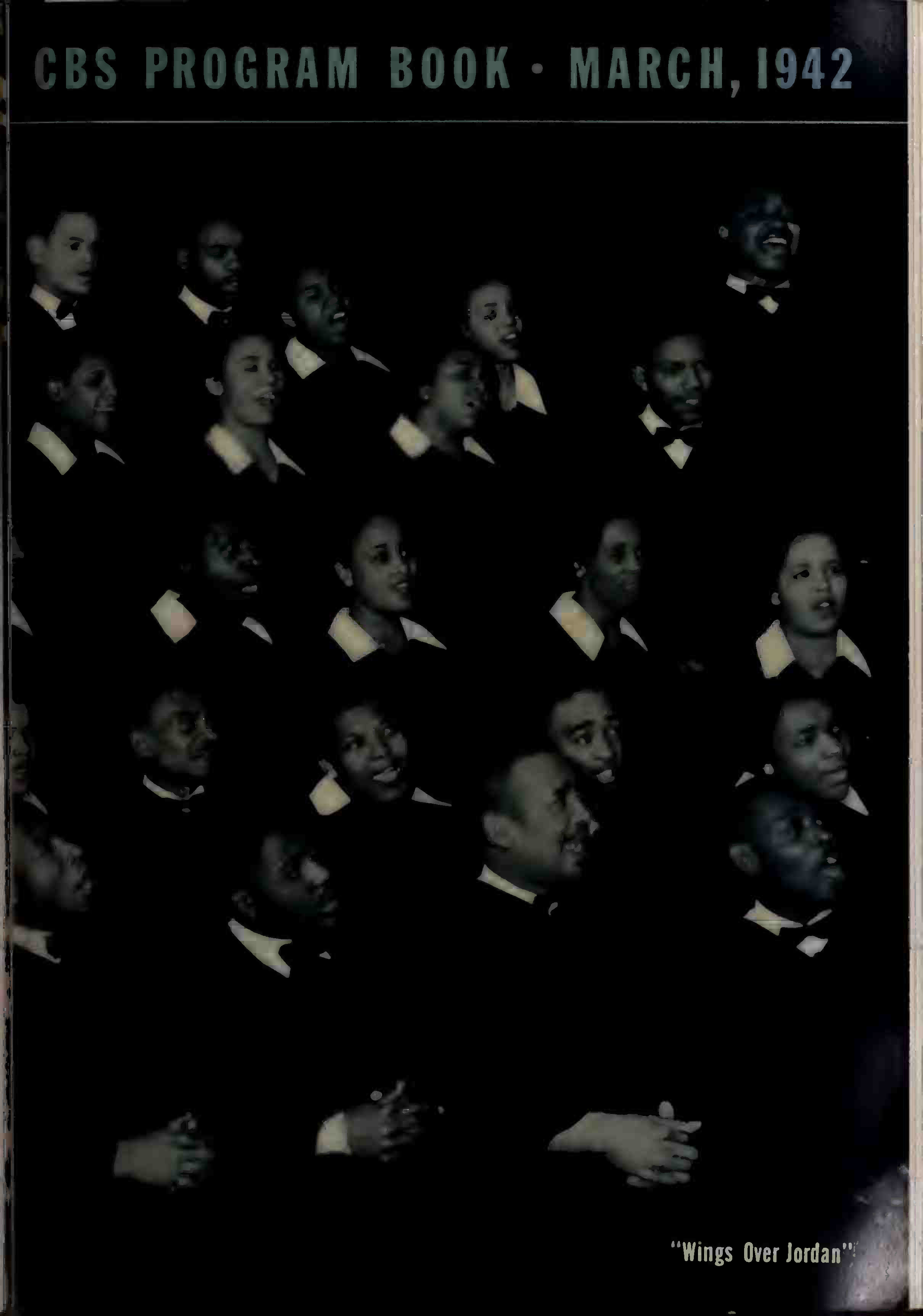
Front cover of CBS' March 1942 Columbia Program Book, featuring the choir

The program's greatest recognition in the radio industry came when WGAR and CBS received inaugural George Foster Peabody Awards in 1941. WGAR won the Peabody for medium-market stations for serving Cleveland's ethnic communities and cultural groups, with Wings Over Jordan cited as "begun (by the station) five years ago to bring about a better understanding between the white and colored peoples" despite the station's modest signal. (Note: In 1940, WGAR operated on the regional frequency of 1450 AM. It made several changes in the following years, moving to 1480 AM in 1941 with the North American Regional Broadcasting Agreement (NARBA) and to 1220 AM in 1944 and increasing its power to 50,000 watts in 1947.) CBS received its awarded for public service at the network level, devoting significant airtime to educational and informative programs. The National Association of Broadcasters (NAB), which awards the Peabodys, cited Wings as the reason for both awards. Some members were very young when Settle formed the choir and were reportedly unimpressed with the Peabody Awards, but the awards would be noted in press releases publicizing upcoming concerts in the years to come.

The New York Public Library's Schomburg Collection added Settle and Wings Over Jordan to its Honor Roll of Race Relations, a nationwide poll conducted annually by Lawrence D. Reddick to recognize people and groups for improving race relations "in terms of real democracy." Settle was placed on the 1939 honor roll for his role with the program, "outstanding of [sic] radio series rendered by Negroes the previous year," and accepted the honor on the February 18, 1940, broadcast. The program was placed on the 1941 honor roll for reaching more listeners than any other program of its kind, and CBS featured the choir on the front cover of its March 1942 program guide in recognition of the honor. Several weeks earlier, Wings Over Jordan had commemorated its fifth year on CBS with the choir boasting that many of its original members were still with them. Schomburg Collection Honor Roll listings for 1939, 1943, 1945 and 1946 were announced live during Wings Over Jordan broadcasts.

The choir signed a recording deal with Columbia Records' Masterworks label, part of CBS's record division, on April 12, 1941. A four-disc, 78-rpm boxed album, produced by Kramer and narrated by Settle, was released the following May. As Kramer's commitment to the choir deepened, he encountered friction from WGAR management who felt he was failing to devote enough attention to other artists in the station's artists services department. (Note: According to a July 6, 1940, New York Age story, WGAR dropped Wings Over Jordan from its lineup and relieved Kramer of his duties due to friction with him, its management and its other artists; the station, however, was contractually obligated to produce the show and compensate the singers (as the choir's concerts were being booked by the station). The story cannot be corroborated, and little evidence exists that WGAR ever dropped the program because of a management dispute.) With Alber-Zwick now managing the choir, Kramer left WGAR and his positions with Wings Over Jordan to become general manager of WGKV in Charleston, West Virginia, on December 26, 1941; however, he remained on the choir's board of trustees. Kramer's new position at WGKV included an ownership stake in the station which was not disclosed to the Federal Communications Commission (FCC) until Kramer neared induction into the U.S. Army at the end of 1943; the omission temporarily jeopardized the station's license. He was fondly remembered by former singers, and Persie Ford recalled that the choir was so responsive to Kramer's direction that it reminded her of "puppets on a string moving only in concert with his fingers".

=== 1942–1946: The war years ===
==== Office of War Information alliance ====
The best contributions radio can make to meeting the entire problem (of low morale among blacks) is by remembering Negroes whenever a program is being worked out on which they or their contributions can be included—and included unostentatiously. Many programs are already doing a constructive job in this direction. Some, on the war, have included mention of Negro heroes. Some, on production, have included Negro workers. Others have drawn attention to outstanding Negro cultural contributions to our civilization. All this is a good start—but only a start.

— Archibald MacLeish, director of the U.S. OWI's Facts and Figures department, May 30, 1942

The December 7, 1941, broadcast of Wings Over Jordan at 10:30 a.m. Eastern time was like any other broadcast, with National Congress of Colored Parents and Teachers president Anna M. P. Strong the guest speaker. News of the Attack on Pearl Harbor broke four hours later, prompting the United States to declare war on Japan and enter World War II. Future guest-speaker topics on Wings had titles such as "This troubled world today", "The meaning of democracy", "Towards racial unity in these times", "Divine help in a time of peril" and "Our second emancipation". The United States Office of War Information (OWI) designated Wings Over Jordan as an official source for news about Black military personnel, and the program documented Black contributions to the war industry. By October 1942, Settle and OWI radio bureau head William B. Lewis had an arrangement for OWI to provide guest speakers for Wings and news bulletins at the beginning of the program. The choir began recording material for the Voice of America (VOA)—established by the OWI as a shortwave counterpropaganda effort—and transcriptions of the CBS program. Only the songs are confirmed to have been broadcast, and the practice continued until 1946. The show was transcribed for the Armed Forces Radio Service (AFRS), and the choir recorded two 78-rpm V-Discs for overseas use.

Researchers had studied how to counteract Adolf Hitler's efficiency with multifaceted propaganda, and saw the unintended terror sparked by Orson Welles' War of the Worlds broadcast as a testament to radio's effect on the public. The OWI's task, under director Elmer Davis (a former CBS newsman), was to influence and control American popular opinion via radio; the office recognized Wings' sizable Black audience. It was lobbied by internal advisors (and one anonymous letter), and Davis saw it as a disservice for the agency to disregard the "state of mind of Negro citizens". Most white-owned media, particularly newspapers and magazines such as Life, ignored or downplayed Blacks. Archibald MacLeish, director of OWI's Facts and Figures department, issued a memo urging the radio industry to develop programming highlighting Black contributions; Billboard published the memo in its June 6, 1942, issue. The memo was sent to all radio networks and stations on May 30, 1942, asking for understanding of Black issues and recognition of "the fact that among the 130,000,000 Americans fighting this war for survival, there are 13,000,000 liberty-loving Negroes doing everything they can to win just like everyone else." The U.S. government was concerned about Axis exploitation of racial tensions with propaganda and other manipulation.

We Negros shall face tyranny where ever it exists ... and when we have finished assisting America in the battles for human freedom (in Europe and the Pacific Islands), we shall be no less vigilant, no less determined, in breaking off the shackles of oppression form the oppressed here at home. For this is our mission, our destiny, throughout the world. We are the measurements of freedom, the storm troopers of the Rights of Man.

— Edwin B. Jourdain, Jr., November 8, 1942

Program guests still occasionally broached controversial subjects which involved the war effort. Edwin B. Jourdain, Jr., Evanston, Illinois's first duly elected black alderman, appeared on the November 8, 1942, program to discuss racial discrimination in the armed forces. His address supported the Double V campaign, launched by the Pittsburgh Courier on February 7, 1942, to rally Blacks to fight for democracy overseas and on the home front: "against our enslavers at home and those abroad who would enslave us." Jourdain invoked the fighting capabilities of Black soldiers in the war to defeat the Axis powers and to work (and fight) after the war to end oppression. His speech was well-received, with Settle calling it "a masterpiece" and multiple requests (including from the OWI) for written copies. The parents of Doris Miller, the first Black recipient of the Navy Cross for operating an anti-aircraft gun against Japanese bombers during the Pearl Harbor attack with no experience, were honored guests on the May 10, 1942, program. Miller's act was initially anonymous, and he had been added to the Schomburg 1941 Honor Roll of Race Relations with the radio program as "an unnamed messman".

==== Changes ====
Worth Kramer's departure necessitated a search for a new conductor. Alabama State College professor Frederick D. Hall was named interim director, with Gladys Olga Jones his assistant. Choir member George McCants was acting director for at least one performance. Hall's involvement was temporary due to his commitments at Alabama State, with Jones taking over by March. In addition to singing contralto and soprano for the choir, Jones trained under Hall as a student at Dillard University. The promotion to director after work with a local Louisiana church choir was viewed by the Pittsburgh Courier as an "almost fairy-like story" and "a success story of which Dillard is justly proud". Jones was appointed shortly before a March 1942 concert in her hometown of New Orleans, which friends and family treated as a homecoming in addition to an August recital. Including Jones, five new singers were introduced into the choir at this time. Although many of its original members remained, the 30-voice roster included singers from 11 states (primarily the Midwest, Deep South, California and New York). Jones' tenure as conductor was brief, and she had been replaced by Joseph S. Powe by October 1942; like Jones, Powe studied under Hall at Dillard. Williette Firmbanks had left the choir to focus on her role as Gethsemane Baptist Church's minister of music.

When this war is over, there shall be no North or South, white or colored, but just all united loyal citizens of the United States.

— Glenn T. Settle, February 28, 1943

During the changes, the choir's performances continued unabated. A Deep South tour included a February 28, 1943, Houston concert for an audience of 4,400 which was delayed for 30 minutes due to the size of the audience and a shortage of seating. A Mother's Day 1943 return to Cleveland and Gethsemane had Settle and the choir honoring the congregation's mothers (including Settle's late mother, Mary), followed by another Deep South tour. The choir finally took an extended vacation in late July 1943 (its first in five-and-a-half years), despite a number of singing engagements in the Cleveland area. The traveling had prompted Settle's wife, Elizabeth Carter Settle, to leave the choir in 1941 to tend to their Cleveland home; this was seen as a sign of marital estrangement. The choir took advantage of the time off for maintenance and renovations to its tour bus, including refrigeration, cooking facilities and restrooms. It is unknown how the choir could afford this, in addition to gasoline and tires, due to wartime rationing.

The vacation in Cleveland marked the end of Joseph S. Powe's 14-month tenure as conductor, when he left the choir to enlist in the United States Navy. Already a featured soloist, Guthrie, Oklahoma, native Hattye Easley was promoted to conductor in a popular move. Settle hired Maurice Goldman—a nationally renowned composer and the Cleveland Institute of Music's director of ensemble—as the choir's permanent conductor in December 1943. Goldman was its second white director, with Easley his assistant. Goldman's hiring, explained as the result of "a long, patient search" for Kramer's successor which involved all Wings board members (including Kramer), was made with postwar intentions of touring "every country on the globe". Choir member Henry Payden later said about Goldman, "he was brilliant, he was excellent, he felt how we (Blacks) sang".

==== European USO tour ====
The fame of Wings Over Jordan has not been confined to this musical organization, but has reflected favorably upon the city of Cleveland, and upon Gethsemane Baptist Church itself. Few churches in the nation are better known than this one ... Any church would be proud of the honor to have its pastor on a USO tour, bringing joy and inspiration to millions of soldiers lonely for home and peace.

— Call and Post editorial, March 10, 1945

The choir's most significant involvement in the war effort was its selection by the United Service Organizations in mid-February 1945 as part of the USO's Camp Shows unit for six months, entertaining active-duty U.S. soldiers. A collaboration by six social-service organizations, the USO was established in 1941 to raise the morale of military personnel. Not all USO canteens in the U.S. were integrated or encouraged integration; two former choir members, Paul Breckenridge and Albert Meadows, performed for a Black audience of 1,000 at Shreveport, Louisiana's Barksdale Air Force Base on January 3, 1945. Although the USO observed Jim Crow laws, it began arranging camp shows for Black troops two years after beginning them for white troops. The first "Negro Unit" camp show toured in 1943 with Willie Bryant, Kenneth Spencer and Ram Ramirez; Bryant said when he returned, "The boys want more entertainment and especially live entertainment". The following year, Harlem-based producer Dick Campbell—the USO's coordinator of Camp Show Negro talent—staged the musical Porgy and Bess in a six-month tour; Campbell was also tasked with overseeing the choir's activities during their engagement.

The USO invitation was the first to a religious musical organization, and was the largest group of entertainers taken overseas. For a year before, servicemen and chaplains asked Settle for the choir to perform overseas. The choir topped a fall 1944 USO poll of servicemen for religious and spiritual groups in future camp shows. The radio program went on hiatus after 372 consecutive Sunday broadcasts over CBS. Its final broadcast was on February 25, 1945, at 10:30 a.m. Eastern; later that evening, the choir was featured on Quentin Reynolds' Radio Reader's Digest on the history of the choir and the program. The following day, the group of 20 people (Note: Madalin Oliva Trigg Price said that the unit consisted of 19 people, but a Stars and Stripes article counted 20.)—18 choir members (including conductor Hattye Easley), Settle and business manager Mildred Ridley—reported to the USO's New York City headquarters to begin a preparation which included vaccinations for smallpox, yellow fever and typhoid fever, fittings for uniforms at Saks Fifth Avenue, and obtaining passports. Cecil Dandy, a singers chosen for the USO tour, had a brother returning from active duty in Europe at the same time. CBS assisted with the preparation and commissioned a picture of the choir, Settle, Easley and Ridley posing in a V formation by a Life photographer. The Call and Post noted the choir's tour and Settle in an editorial, considering it Settle's "greatest assignment" and the choir "a beacon light of better racial understanding".

For security purposes (aerial and submarine warfare), the choir's departure was a military secret. Boarding the USS West Point on March 21, 1945, with about 5,000 military and other service personnel, all members were designated as captains for protective purposes if they were captured. News received in transit about the death of President Roosevelt emotionally affected everyone on board. Landing at Le Havre and transported to Peninsular Base Section (PBS) headquarters in Naples, the six-month tour of the Mediterranean Theater of Operations (MTO) began on April 29, 1945. The 98th Regiment of Engineers, stationed in Italy, built a venue for the choir with modern lighting and sound which was called "The Wings Over Jordan Stadium". Settle told the Call and Post that the choir was "setting things on fire" overseas. The choir was able to see the sights in Rome and Vatican City, despite performing as many as six days a week. Settle told a Stars and Stripes reporter, "in some places they've been hanging from the rafters, and they keep shouting their favorites and making requests for numbers we've been singing since 'Wings' was organized". One concert had a long standing ovation as the choir walked onstage and ended with several encores for the audience of G.I.s; the choir was then invited to a social by the company's commanding officer.

===== MTO and ETO =====
We didn’t (travel) like Bob Hope with the pretty girls. We were (called) a foxhole unit, because we had to try to talk to ordinary soldiers who were fighting. We had to go to the hospitals where they were injured.

— Kenneth Slaughter

The choir was most closely involved during the first phase of their tour with the 92nd Infantry Division, an all-black unit led by Major General Edward Almond. Almond invited the choir to sing for the division on Easter 1945; they dedicated "We'll Understand It Better, Bye and Bye" to the unit, and followed with an impromptu rendition of "My Lord What a Mornin'". The choir's arrival also had family bonds: PFC Carl Slaughter of Columbus, Ohio, was the brother of tour participant Kenneth Slaughter, who had joined the choir in 1942. Settle's conviction that servicemen wanted to return to religion was fortified by two of the choir's more popular songs: "He'll Understand And Say "Well Done"" and "Just A Closer Walk With Thee". The choir opened a series of concerts celebrating V-E Day on May 7, 1945, and hosted a Mother's Day program. Its reception by the G.I.s was positive, and the choir was offered a full six-month tour commitment. Members of the 92nd Division and the all-white 473rd Infantry Regiment were tasked with finding any remaining Nazi collaborators, liberating La Spezia and Genoa on April 27, 1945. The rare integrated front lines were said by Pittsburgh Courier war correspondent Collins George to resemble "a League of Nations, what with Japanese-Americans, American Negros, whites, Brazilians and the British all joined in the inspired race to cover the territory in Northern Italy".

The division was tasked with returning to Genoa a golden urn reportedly containing the remains of Christopher Columbus in an outdoor ceremony on June 6, 1945, with the 370th Infantry Regiment assisting and the choir performing for 5,000 servicemen and the city's residents. The Genoese requested that the choir perform at the ceremony (unprecedented for an occupied European nation), indicative of its popularity in the USO Camp Shows. The claim that Columbus' ashes were in the urn was contested during re-interment; the Encyclopædia Britannica said that his remains were in Seville Cathedral, (Note: A crypt in the Columbus Lighthouse in Santo Domingo Este, Dominican Republic also claims Columbus' remains. See Christopher Columbus § Location of remains for more.) but the 92nd Division treated the ceremony as returning property moved due to the war and the choir said that the remains were Columbus' in postwar promotional stories. According to Mildred Ridley, the choir frequently spent time in infirmaries with wounded servicemen, ate and socialized in mess halls with G.I.s, and used wit and humor to brighten up the atmosphere during its appearances. The choir and Settle received citations from Almond for meritorious service and the "fine spirit of patriotism exhibited by the group", the highest civilian awards by the military. Ridley's son, Sergeant Theodore Johnson, presented her with roses when they met in Leghorn.

Well, we've bounced all over Italy, North Africa, Sicily, France, Belgium and Germany in a six by six truck and now these cushions are so soft, I'm afraid to sit down for fear I'll sink through one.

— Hattye Easley

The choir's five-month MTO tour was immediately followed up by a four-month tour in the European Theater of Operations (ETO). Announced by Settle on September 9, 1945, this extended the choir's USO commitment from six months to ten and followed a successful week of appearances in Rome after performing throughout Italy. An October 24, 1945, CBS press release cited "urgent appeals from the Special Service section and from many Army chaplains in the ETO" as a reason for the extension. The ETO transfer after they reported to Le Harve on October 6, 1945; the choir flew to Paris shortly after blackout restrictions were lifted, and the city was lit "like a huge jewel". Settle called the MTO tour "the grandest six months of our career" and prayed for every serviceman to return home to their native land as soon as possible for "a greater opportunity to serve humanity's cause in a lasting peace, for which they have nobly fought". Three military personnel were assigned to the group, which traveled in a six-by-six truck containing scenery, props and floodlights, a public address system and kerosene-powered stoves. Along with existing material recorded for the VOA, several performances were broadcast live over AFRS (including the Genoa concert and a Christmas program with Red Skelton, Mickey Rooney and Fred Waring's orchestra); the Christmas program was transcribed for broadcast in the U.S. When the ETO phase of the USO tour ended on January 27, 1946, the choir had performed in Le Harve and Paris, the Belgium towns of Brussels, Liège and Antwerp, and the German cities of Bad Nauheim, Frankfurt and Stuttgart. ETO headquarters in Paris honored Mildred Ridley as the most efficient manager of any overseas Camp Show unit.

At Settle's suggestion, CBS kept the choir's time slot by hosting a rotation of prominent black choirs which performed under the Wings Over Jordan banner; they were produced and directed by his son, Glenn Howard Settle. The first choir selected as a "pinch hitter" for Wings was Fisk University's, noted for its ties to the Jubilee Singers. Originating from Nashville's WLAC, the Fisk choir's Easter broadcast on April 1, 1945, was also broadcast overseas on shortwave. Other groups performing in the time slot included the Agricultural and Technical College of North Carolina's Choral Society from Greensboro, The Legend Singers of St. Louis, the Camp Meetin' Choir of Charlotte, North Carolina, and Alabama's Tuskegee Institute Choir. The Fisk University Choir returned to perform in the time slot in November and December, including a program of Christmas carols. The Tuskegee Institute Choir was the last group to substitute in February 1946, with Wings Over Jordan resuming when the choir returned on March 3, 1946, after a year-long hiatus. The choir returned to the U.S. with the men sailing on the SS Westminster Victory and the women on the SS Hood Victory and traveled from New York City to Cleveland, where several churches joined in hosting a gala celebration concert. Not all of the singers made the entire tour; Kenneth Slaughter withdrew after a three-week hospitalization, returning to the U.S. in late 1945 with three other singers. Although this ended his involvement with the choir, the USO issued service awards to him and everyone else for their efforts.

=== 1946–1955: Postwar activities ===
==== More touring ====
After their return in February 1946 and a few days with family members, the choir began one of the largest concert tours in its history; between April 1946 and April 1947, it traveled over 100,000 miles (160,000 km) and performed for over 250,000 people. Highlights included performances at Madison Square Garden and the Hollywood Bowl; after the latter, director James Lewis Elkins was invited by New York Philharmonic director Artur Rodziński to perform with the orchestra the following spring. On January 7, 1947, the choir awarded its first college scholarship; the ceremony was held in Cleveland, the choir's birthplace, and Settle promised to award 20 music scholarships by the end of the year. By November 1946, the choir was fully booked for 1947 and much of 1948. Charles King was appointed interim conductor in the middle of the tour when Elkins took a brief break from the 44-state schedule; his work was positively received, and he and Elkins were named joint conductors. Elkins was the highest-paid Black conductor in the country. The choir now used two buses for traveling, enabling one bus to be serviced and maintained while touring. One bus was vandalized during a concert in Rockingham, North Carolina, when a white man covered its signage with aluminum paint; local businessmen provided the choir with paint thinner, and the vandal was fined $500 and sentenced to six months on a chain gang for what the judge called "tampering with the works of God".

The choir returned to Cleveland for the first time in over a year on May 7, 1947, for a benefit concert at Gethsemane Baptist Church. Relations between Settle and Gethsemane had deteriorated due to his prolonged absences, however, and several members met secretly on April 8, 1946, to declare the church's pulpit "vacant". Settle resigned as pastor, admitting that he had not been an active pastor for over a year. Since the choir's activities were largely based in New York City, CBS flagship WCBS was reportedly identified at least once as the originating station of Wings Over Jordan. The distinction was probably academic, because the touring choir broadcast from a different affiliate each week. Construction was underway on a new office building in Cleveland for the choir, and Settle announced plans for a shrine honoring his mother which would include an auditorium with a pipe organ and radio facilities. He announced a change in the spelling of his first name to Glynn after being named heir to an island in the Dan River in his grandfather's will, which stipulated that the heir had to have "Glynn" and "Settle" in their name. Settle was admitted to the West Palm Beach Sailfish Club after catching a record-sized sailfish, and was the club's first Black member.

==== August 1947 walkout ====
I was planning to leave the choir soon, to accept a position as head of the music department at Albany State College ... when I told Rev. Settle of my feelings regarding his treatment of choir members, he denounced me bitterly. He told me that I was the worst conductor he had ever had. This, in spite of the fact that out of the 14 conductors he has had in ten years, I am the only one who was ever recognized by the New York Philharmonic Orchestra.

— James Lewis Elkins

The CBS program remained popular, despite the 10-month USO tour hiatus. Remote broadcasts coincided with the choir's touring (which had reached 400 cities in 46 states), and they met at affiliate studios hours in advance. On August 10, 1947, the show celebrated its 500th episode and the choir began another trip to California which included a cameo appearance in a Warner Bros. film. Behind the scenes, the postwar activities took a substantial toll on the choir. Annual auditions for singers had been held as early as 1939, becoming more extensive after most of the original roster left. Auditions for singers were held in every town which hosted a concert by 1942, yielding 20 singers from fifteen states. Although Wings had about 40 singers on its original roster and many were still singing for the radio program's fifth anniversary in 1942, its number decreased to 17 singers in the summer of 1947; according to one estimate, as many as 250 people had participated in the choir in some capacity. Original member Tommy Roberts rejoined the choir for the postwar tour as a featured soloist and recruited his wife, Evelyn Freeman Roberts—a classically trained pianist and swing bandleader—as an arranger. Settle fired Evelyn several months later when her work began to rival his in popularity; Tommy to quit in protest, later saying: "When (Settle) fired her, he fired me".

On August 24, 1947, two weeks after the show's 500th episode, the choir staged a walkout against Settle; refusing to perform at the San Diego CBS affiliate, they left the previous night for Los Angeles. Settle's son, Wings business manager Glenn T. Settle, Jr., promised that the choir would return on radio the following week and called the action a "revolt": "You can say that the choir is not destroyed ... that is all I can say on the record." In addition to the radio broadcast, several concerts (including one in Tucson) were cancelled due to the walkout. The choir members expressed deep resentment of Settle, accusing him of inhumane working conditions and low wages. Allegations were made of "a total lack of consideration for the members of the organization" as Settle refused to grant vacation time and laid them off when they were not on tour. Several members, including Emory Barnes and John Carpenter, resigned in protest the week before. Barnes' resignation was over Settle's "unchristian attitude", with Settle accusing him in turn of "being a very miserable failure." None of the singers were salaried employees, which had pressured past singers to leave in favor of more gainful employment. Typical weekly compensation for singers was $52.50 (equivalent to $757 in 2025), and conductor James Elkins received $150 (equivalent to $2,163 in 2025). Members were responsible for all non-travel expenses; Elkins' unrelated resignation was met with bitter insults from Settle, who called him the worst conductor the choir had ever had. Although there had been previous walkouts by the choir, this was the first one which prevented an episode of Wings from being broadcast. The members had considered a walkout several months before, but felt an obligation to perform for the public and still agreed with the principles of Settle's Spiritual Preservation Fund.

==== CBS cancellation and aftermath ====
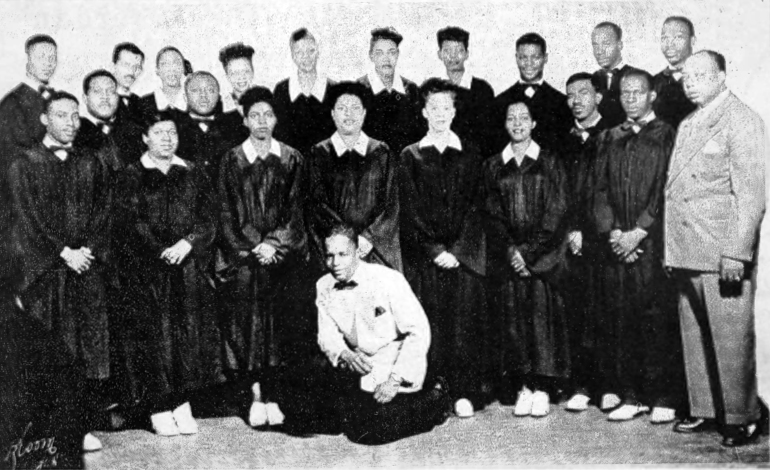
1949 publicity photo, taken after Glynn Settle (far right) replaced the entire roster after a walkout. Conductor Gilbert Allen is kneeling in the center front.

Settle tried to resolve the dispute by persuading the singers to return, but only one agreed to do so. He dismissed all 17 singers and began a nationwide canvassing effort for replacement singers, which included auditions in San Angelo, Texas. Among those joining the reconstituted choir were original singers Lois Waterford (Parker) and Olive Thompson, whose return was described as "many original choristers (that) have returned to the organization." CBS cancelled the radio program after the October 12, 1947, broadcast, offering the time slot to college choirs from Black universities who included the Atlanta-Morehouse-Spelman choir (originating on Atlanta's WGST). Daily Press columnist Paul Luther suggested in his column that the cancellation was temporary, due to the touring which made it difficult to produce the program from affiliate stations. Director Clarence H. Brooks later said that the show ended for the choir "to promote Christian fellowship and song", but CBS permanently dropped the program after the no-show and accusations against Settle. The choir agreed to tour Mexico in November 1947. It then performed with the San Antonio Symphony on November 22, 1947, a concert seen as an achievement after the choir had experienced discrimination in the city.

The choir remained a popular concert draw in 1948 despite its radio-show cancellation, performing in 45 of the 48 states and raising over $1 million (equivalent to $13,400,277 in 2025) for a number of charities. Under newly appointed conductor Gilbert Allen, the choir signed a contract with RCA Records; its first 78-rpm single, "Until I Found The Lord" and "He'll Understand And Say 'Well Done'", was released in October 1948. It was their third recording deal, after Columbia and King Records' Queen label. Of the choir's RCA output, the December 1948 release of "Sweet Little Jesus Boy" and "Amen" was the most popular and enduring. A call-and-response-style hymn, "Amen" became a staple of concerts and future recordings and was the title of a 1956 King compilation album. WGAR was moving on: earlier in 1947, the station introduced a Sunday-night program with the local Dixieteers quartet. WGAR broadcast a 1948 limited-run program with the Kingdom Choir, composed of former Wings members and conducted by King, after the cancellation. Another program, The Karaleers of Karamu House, premiered on the station on January 1, 1950, to a positive reception. Settle again received negative publicity after a complaint alleged that neglect of his Cleveland residence posed a fire hazard; the case was settled in court on August 12, 1949, with Settle paying a $250 fine.

==== New business model ====
The radio program was revived on the Mutual Broadcasting System, with the January 9, 1949, debut promoted as the show's 510th episode. Mutual had over 500 affiliates at the time, more than any other U.S. radio network. (Note: Despite its large affiliate base, Mutual operated as a co-op; affiliates could preempt (or decline to carry) any show offered by the network. Of Ohio's Mutual affiliates, no evidence exists that Cleveland's WHK or Akron's WHKK carried the show; Sandusky's WLEC carried the first two Saturday-afternoon programs (listed as Wings), but subsequent listings do not include the Sunday broadcasts. Dayton's WONE carried the program live until early September 1949, and Cincinnati's WCPO aired it on tape in the evening.) Despite the show's presentation as a continuation of the sustaining CBS program, the Mutual version was sponsored by the Treasury Department to promote its United States Savings Bonds program. Although guest speakers were still a core feature of the program, their emphasis shifted from discussion of issues facing Black people to "the life stories of prominent American Negroes in words and song". The choir traveled to Mutual affiliates for remote broadcasts to host guest speakers, accommodate its travel itinerary (which involved another tour in the Deep South), and record additional material for RCA Victor. The Mutual show was scheduled on Saturday afternoons for two weeks before moving to Sundays at 12 p.m. and to 9:30 a.m. by July. A similar Mutual Saturday-afternoon program with Black college choral groups premiered, and Wings Over Jordan was quietly dropped from the lineup at the end of 1949 when the U.S. Treasury withdrew its sponsorship.

Around this time, press releases for the choir began to promote a different business model. Admission had been charged and proceeds distributed accordingly, but concerts were now free to the public with free-will offerings encouraged. Some of the money raised from donations went to the Spiritual Preservation Fund, source of the Wings scholarship fund. Booklets featuring the choir were given out, with Settle saying that admissions were now a hindrance for those who wanted to attend their concerts and the change was made "to combat the influence of communism in America as it affects the Negro". Reviewers praised the choir for the practice, with one calling it an "unselfish effort". Membership turnover continued to be high, with Settle declining to properly train some of the newer singers; these younger, inexperienced singers were expected to know the repertoire or pantomime their performances, affecting the choir's sound quality and contradicting its founding principles.

The choir's reputation preceded itself as the USO invited Wings to again perform for overseas personnel (this time stationed in Hawaii, the Philippines, South Korea and Japan), beginning on December 15, 1953. This was the second time the choir sang on what were still foreign battlefields. Concerts in South Korea frequently had overflow crowds, whom the singers visited afterwards (sometimes in sub-zero temperatures). The choir first appeared on television in Japan, appearing several times on NHK, and was broadcast to military personnel by radio. In a letter to the Uniontown Evening Standard, Settle expressed his intentions to have the choir tour the world to further the fight against communism. His wife, Elizabeth Carter Settle, accompanied the choir on this tour but otherwise remained in Uniontown; she died in Cleveland on May 17, 1955, while visiting one of their daughters. Settle married the choir's business manager, Mildred C. Ridley (who had given birth to one of his sons extramaritally in 1947), on June 1 and moved to Los Angeles.

=== 1955–1978: Later performances ===
==== Satellite choirs and reorganizations ====
Now, almost twenty years later, there is no Wings Over Jordan. From national and international tours, world recognition and musical artistry, the singers that were integral parts of this choir have gone their separate ways—some to fame and fortune, some to death, to prison; some to routine living and all to reminiscing.

— June Williams, April 13, 1957

Since the choir had lost its original members and demand continued for concerts, Settle formed several satellite groups which used the Wings name. The Legend Singers of St. Louis—one of several substitute choirs on the CBS radio show during the 1945 USO tour—were designated as one of the groups by Settle in January 1950, and were joined by an East Coast choir directed by Clarence H. Brooks. These were reorganized into two choruses by 1957: the 20-member West Coast group led by Settle and Frank Everett, and Brooks' nine-member East Coast group. The reorganization was billed as a "crusade" by Settle and Everett to preserve spirituals "as an American tradition", and the choirs as a "successor to the original great Wings Over Jordan Choir". During this period, several albums were recorded by both choirs: The World's Greatest Negro Choir (Dial Records, 1958) and The World's Greatest Spiritual Singers (ABC-Paramount, 1960); the latter celebrated the group's 25th anniversary. The ABC-Paramount album was recorded in the auditorium of an abandoned USO building in Mineral Wells, Texas, and the production-related difficulties were detailed in its liner notes. An additional King album of previously released material, An Outstanding Collection of Traditional Negro Spirituals, was also released in 1958.

Both choirs continued touring nationwide over the next few years, singing for audiences of various sizes; promotional stories typically read, "The sponsors have expressed confidence that, with this group's fame going ahead of them, the ... auditorium will be filled to capacity".

An August 1964 tour by the East Coast choir went awry after two concerts in Tifton and Brunswick, Georgia, on consecutive nights were cancelled when the choir failed to appear. This followed a concert in Americus two nights earlier, when local police pulled them over for allegedly leading civil-rights demonstrations. The two no-shows prompted requests for the Georgia State Patrol to search for the missing group, but an all-points bulletin was never issued due to lack of information (including the license plate number of the tour bus). All nine singers showed up in Albany the next day for a concert at Bethel A.M.E. Church, but the concert was cancelled because the audience was considered too small. Although the East Coast choir vowed to "press on" with its 1964 tour, both choirs folded as the year ended. Los Angeles musician and composer Leroy Hurte reorganized the West Coast version of Wings several months later, briefly directing it and two other chorales. The extent of Hurte's involvement is undetermined, since Frank Everett eventually resumed his role as director. The choir sang as part of an interfaith music program at Settle's First Baptist Church on July 25, 1965, with other Protestant and Catholic performers.

==== Settle's death and choir decline ====
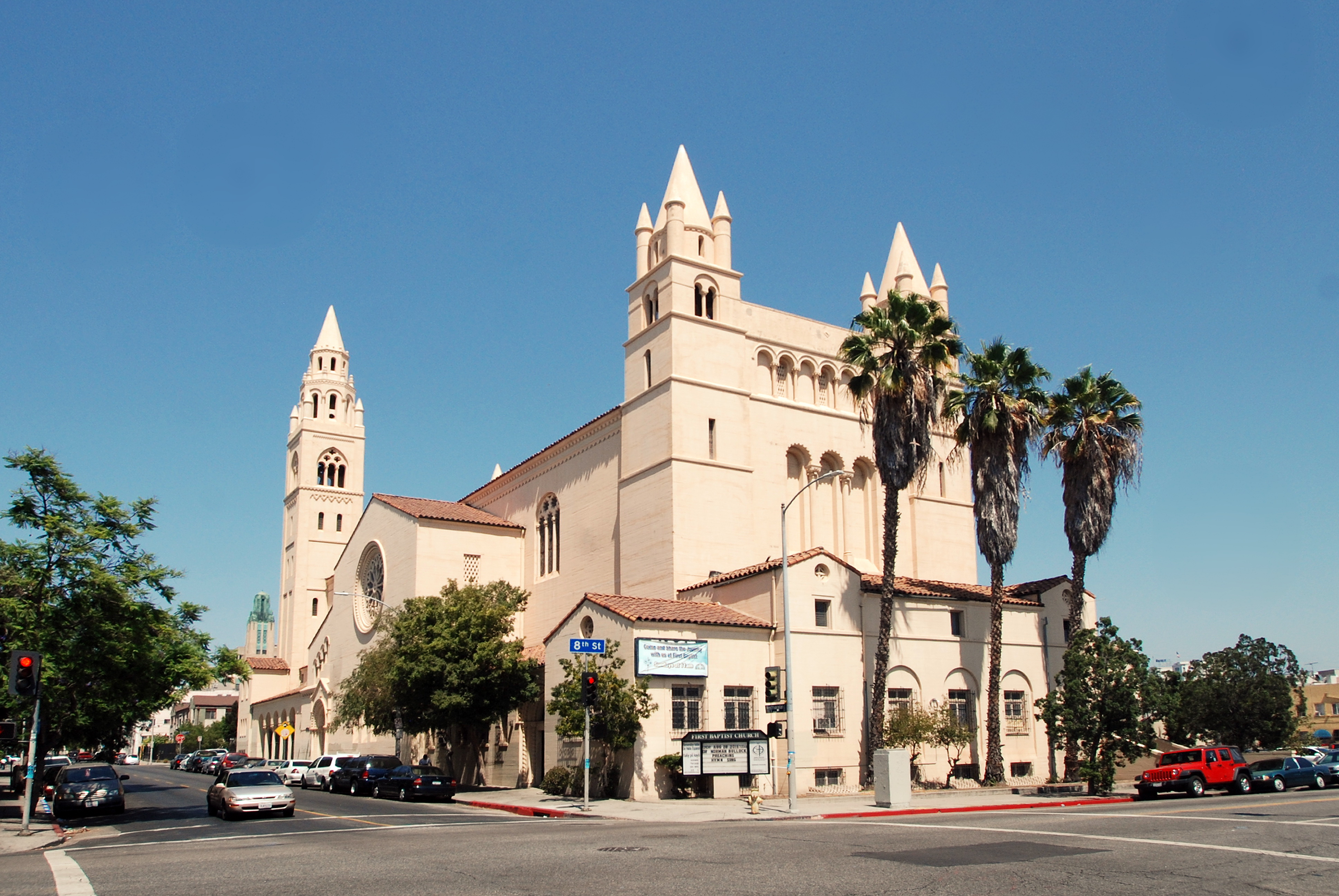
Settle was a lay minister at the First Baptist Church of Los Angeles until his 1967 death.

Settle continued to be involved with the choir and music ministry until his death on July 16, 1967; a week earlier, he had directed the First Baptist Church's ninth annual Brotherhood Festival in Song. Without him, the choir's activity decreased significantly. A tribute concert to Settle was held at First Baptist on February 16, 1969, with Wings and other choruses singing, and the choir marked its 35th anniversary with an awards banquet on February 21, 1971, at the Hollywood Palladium to benefit a Settle memorial scholarship fund. The choir toured Japan in 1970 and 1972. Frank Everett's tenure as director ended in 1978, although his last concert in the United States was in Hartford, Connecticut, on April 23, 1972. Settle's widow Mildred reportedly destroyed documents belonging to him in 1970, but donated other documents and items pertaining to Wings (including material from an unfinished 1971 album) to the National Afro-American Museum and Cultural Center.

Many of its surviving members frequently reunited in the years after the original choir disbanded. The first major reunion was on April 14, 1957, commemorating the 20th anniversary of the radio program's debut; many surviving members and some of the show's guest speakers were in attendance. An annual reunion of Wings alumni began in 1971, with former assistant director Willette Firmbanks Thompson heading the alumni association. Firmbanks maintained her role as Gethsemane's minister of music until her husband's death in 1950. An "Appreciation Tea" was held for her by Gethsemane's Senior Choir on February 3, 1952, with many parishioners, choir members and civic leaders in attendance; Settle, Worth Kramer and Member of Congress Frances P. Bolton sent cards and telegrams in recognition of Firmbanks' contributions.

== Legacy ==
=== Historical appraisals ===
... how well (Glynn T. Settle) has succeeded in bringing closer understanding between black and while has been demonstrated by the Wings' work both in the United States and abroad. Their radio broadcasts were eagerly awaited each week by an integrated public moved by the power and beauty of true American music and the deep richness of faith with permeates the Negro's love for God and their country ... The basis of the gospel repertoire remains these hymns, just as the essence of the gospel style is a wordless moan. Through the years, they all played their part.

— Bill "Hoss" Allen, WLAC announcer

Settle's objectives for the choir when it was formed were to help improve race relations through music and preserve the authenticity of the African-American spiritual, both of which were met in the concert hall and on radio. The choir's original members were members of Gethsemane Baptist Church, a modest church near Cleveland's downtown, and were lower-class workers in the depths of the Great Depression. Although they had no formal music training until Worth Kramer's involvement, they learned how to sing spirituals through oral tradition and kept the form alive in a pure, authentic manner. Unlike popular groups touring internationally (such as the Fisk Jubilee Singers), their songs were not necessarily popular among post-Reconstruction Blacks and were changed in minstrel acts and burlesque. Kramer's open-minded social beliefs gave the choir avenues for outreach—a radio show promoted to CBS less than six months after the choir's WGAR debut, integrated concert bookings, and a contract with a prestigious record label—which would have been otherwise impossible. His musical background and experience in written composition also helped to preserve spirituals in print form.

Public support by prominent whites (including First Lady Eleanor Roosevelt, New York Mayor Fiorello La Guardia and Cleveland Press editor-in-chief Louis B. Seltzer), coupled with the weekly radio program's popularity among Blacks, demonstrates the choir's tangible, lasting interracial impact. John Ball's novel In the Heat of the Night, which inspired an acclaimed film of the same name, is dedicated to Settle, "whose authoritative knowledge and stimulating conversation contributed so much to the making of this book". Scholarly and critical analysis has designated Wings Over Jordan as a forerunner of the civil rights movement which began in 1954, four years after the radio show ended. During the late 1950s and early 1960s, spirituals were embraced by leaders and activists for their social and political impact; many of the songs were merely about the fight to survive. As theologian Howard Thurman said, "the spirituals were to meet the need of the present journeys"; the spiritual "We Shall Overcome" became a defining protest song of the era. Cleveland mayor Harold Hitz Burton, one of two guests on the premiere of WGAR's Negro Hour, was elected to the United States Senate while serving on the choir's board of trustees. Elevated to the Supreme Court of the United States under President Harry S. Truman, Brown is he best known for his participation in the unanimous Brown v. Board of Education ruling.

=== Nearly forgotten ===
Despite being CBS's most-prominent sustaining program during much of the Golden Age of Radio, Wings Over Jordan is not well-remembered; historian Erik Barnouw's anthology series, A History of Broadcasting in the United States, had no information on the program. CBS did not mention Wings Over Jordan during the network's 50th-anniversary retrospective in 1977, despite records and clippings of the show in its archives. Although WGAR mentioned the success of Wings Over Jordan as part of a lengthy 1948 filing with the FCC for the station's license renewal, (Note: In 1948, WGAR produced a two-volume station history for the Federal Communications Commission (FCC) when accusations were made about the editorial and business practices of owner George A. Richards. Wings Over Jordan is conflated with the station's previous carriage of the NBC Blue Network Southernaires: "WGAR originated the famous program WINGS OVER JORDAN, which was fed from Cleveland first to the National Broadcasting Company Blue Network, and later to CBS ... In 1936, "Wings Over Jordan" was given a network spot by the National Broadcasting Company. In 1937, the program went with WGAR to the Columbia Broadcasting System ...") the station underwent a number of changes in the following years. After the death of station founder George A. Richards in 1951, WGAR was sold to the antecedent of Nationwide Communications in 1953; ended its CBS affiliation in 1962; moved its studios to Broadview Heights in 1971, and began simulcasting WGAR-FM in 1986. Nationwide sold WGAR in 1990, retaining WGAR-FM and moving its studios to Independence. (Note: WGAR and WGAR-FM were resold several times following passage of the Telecommunications Act of 1996. WGAR was renamed WKNR in 1990, became WHK in 2001, and is Christian-formatted WHKW (owned by Salem Media Group). Nationwide sold its radio holdings (including WGAR-FM) to Jacor in 1998, which merged into Clear Channel Communications the following year and was rebranded iHeartMedia in 2014.) WGAR-FM inherited the AM station's legacy and heritage, but a 1995 Akron Beacon Journal profile of the country music station "perhaps always associated with greatness" did not mention Wings Over Jordan.

KCBS-TV in Los Angeles (CBS's West Coast television flagship station) produced Wings Over Jordan: We Remember, a half-hour documentary on the choir which aired on February 18, 1989 and was nominated for an NAACP Image Award later that year. The Library of Congress selected the May 10, 1942, broadcast of Wings Over Jordan for preservation in its National Recording Registry on May 14, 2008, with many the show's AFRS transcriptions also available in its collection. Worth Kramer re-entered radio broadcasting after the war, becoming program director of WJR (WGAR's sister station in Detroit) in 1946. Kramer remained there until 1963, making WJR a public-service leader and helping to sign on WJRT-TV in Flint. He eventually entered station ownership again with Sarasota, Florida's WSPB, WMRN and WMRN-FM in Marion. At his death on July 19, 1998, at age 89, Kramer was noted for his stewardship of Wings Over Jordan and his commitment to on-air decency (including a prohibition of on-air profanity on his stations). Wayne Mack, who introduced and closed all WGAR Wings broadcasts, was also remembered for his involvement with the show when he died on October 15, 2000.

=== "That which is worthy must be preserved" ===
If today's children knew how much was invested, and the things that they are enjoying today ... rock-and-roll ... everything has its base in that music. And they should learn to cherish the source. And we should tell them the source. The source is those early pioneers of music who did it not only for entertainment, but as a source of nourishment to the human soul and body.

— Esther Rolle

The "Wings Over Jordan Celebration Chorus" was formed in 1988 as a tribute act and continuation of the original choir. Music teacher and Gethsemane Baptist Church choir director Glenn T. Brackens (Note: Due to urban renewal, the church was forced to relocate in 1954 to Cleveland's Hough neighborhood; its location during Settle's pastorate was redeveloped into the campus of Cuyahoga Community College.) founded the choir with assistance from Samuel Barber, an Ohio State University historian who researched and archived the original choir's history. Grandson of original Wings singer Persie Ford, Brackens grew up listening to stories about Ford's activities in the choir. Ford had an extensive collection of memorabilia of the original choir's activities and travels at her Cleveland home, but a photo scrapbook was misplaced by Brackens and is believed lost. The tribute chorus had its first public performance on June 11, 1988, commemorating the 50th anniversary of the national CBS debut of Wings Over Jordan, and was so well-received that additional singers were recruited. Wings Over Jordan Alumni and Friends (WOJAF) was established as an administrative body for the chorus and an alumni association open to surviving Wings members and members of the tribute chorus. Brackens has revived "That which is worthy must be preserved", Settle's motto for the original choir, as the chorus' slogan. Although church members and the WOJAF have expressed interest in a library devoted to the history of Wings Over Jordan since 1988, financial issues have been an obstacle.

The messages that they sang gave the black people hope. We still sing those songs, written by black writers, because we're still in that hope that one day we will be ... just ... people.

— Helen Turner Thompson

Unlike the original choir, the Celebration Chorus includes several gospel songs in its repertoire and some spirituals have a piano accompaniment. Brackens considers it consistent with Settle's desire to preserve the spirituals, and artistic license permits him to interpret the songs as he sees fit. Some purists have considered the changes unacceptable, noting the spirituals' sacred status and Kramer's criticism of swing bandleaders who used them for their benefit. Researcher Babette Reid Harrell says that the Celebration Chorus performs "stylized adaptions" of spirituals similar to the Fisk Jubilee Singers, who helped to elevate spirituals to an art form as early as the 1870s. Zora Neale Hurston has said that no genuine performance of spiritual music (including in a concert hall) has taken place since the Fisk Jubilee Singers; composers have based their printed compositions on an art form which cannot be duplicated. Wings researcher Regennia Nanette Williams has defended the piano additions, considering them a tribute to former assistant director Williette Firmbanks' work as pianist. The Celebration Chorus had members with direct and indirect ties to Wings when it was formed. Persie Ford joined the tribute chorus and became one of its most vocal supporters, favorably comparing it to the original choir. Teretha Settle Overton, Settle's granddaughter, is also a member of the chorus and has been interviewed for several retrospectives on the choir. John Foxhall was a member of the original choir and president of WOJAF, with family ties to the church dating back to the early 1900s. The Celebration Chorus currently limits its number of public performances to three per year.

Kenneth Franklin Slaughter was believed to be the last known living member of Wings at his death on August 25, 2014, at age 92. Slaughter, who frequently related his experiences with the choir in lectures and interviews, was honored as a "living legend" by the African American Museum in Philadelphia in 2011. John Foxhall, who died February 25, 2021, at age 94, was noted for his long stewardship of WOJAF and his archival work; according to his WEWS-TV obituary, "There's no legacy of Wings Over Jordan Choir without Foxhall".

== Personnel ==
Former members have estimated that the choir originally had a roster of between 40 and 50 members in the summer of 1937, consisting of mostly unmarried men and women, with an age range between 17 and 30. Because of the total number of singers that were ultimately associated with the choir, either in their original incarnation or the varied satellite units that bore the "Wings Over Jordan Choir" name after 1950, a definitive list is almost impossible to compile.

== Discography ==
=== Musical scores ===
- Kramer, Worth (1940). Wings Over Jordan: Favorite Spirituals of 1939 (Musical score). Philadelphia: Rodeheaver, Hall-Mack Co. LCCN 45053422. OCLC 25723873.

=== Singles ===
- 1945: "The Old Ark's A'Moverin'" (V-Disc 353A)
- 1945: "I Couldn't Hear Nobody Pray" (V-Disc 397A)
- 1946: "Deep River" / "Old Ship Of Zion" (Queen 4140)
- 1946: "Were You There?" / "Take Me To The Water" (Queen 4141)
- 1946: "I'm Rollin'" / "When You Come Out The Wilderness" (Queen 4142)
- 1946: "Swing Low, Sweet Chariot" / "Trampin'" (Queen 4154)
- 1946: "My Lord's Gonna Move This Wicked Race" / "You Got To Stand The Test In Judgement" (Queen 4155)
- 1946: "Plenty Good Room" / "I Will Trust In The Lord" (Queen 4156)
- 1948: "Until I Found The Lord" / "He'll Understand And Say 'Well Done'" (RCA Victor 20-3128)
- 1948: "Sweet Little Jesus Boy" / "Amen" (RCA Victor 20-3242)
- 1948: "Just A Closer Walk With Thee" / "Pray On" (RCA Victor 22-0006)
- 1949: "Rock A-My Soul" / "Sweet Little Jesus Boy" (Sterling WOJ 1-2)
- 1953: "Wings Over Jordan Choir Vol. 1" (King EP-232)
- 1953: "Wings Over Jordan Choir Vol. 2" (King EP-233)
- 1953: "Wings Over Jordan Choir Vol. 3" (King EP-234)
- 1956: "Take Me To The Water" / "Hush Children, Somebody's Calling My Name" (Dial 1238)

=== Studio albums ===
- 1942: Wings Over Jordan (Columbia Masterworks M-499) LCCN 2001-573406.
- 1956: Amen (King LP-395-519) LCCN 94-758062.
- 1958: World's Greatest Negro Choir (Dial LP-5163)
- 1960: The World's Greatest Spiritual Singers (ABC-Paramount LP-338)

=== Compilation albums ===
- 1958: An Outstanding Collection of Traditional Negro Spirituals (King LP-560)
- 1961: My Soul Is a Witness (Electrola E 41 295)
- 1974: Wings Over Jordan (ABC Songbird SBLP-246) LCCN 95-783819.
- 1978: Original Greatest Hits (King/Gusto K-5021)
- 2007: Trying to Get Ready (Gospel Friend PN-1505)

== See also ==
- WHKW – the originating radio station for Wings Over Jordan, which identified as WGAR from 1930 to 1990.
- Music & the Spoken Word – a similar religious radio program continuously broadcast since 1929.

== Bibliography ==
- Harrell, Babette Reid (2019). "Preserving the Negro Spiritual: A Case Study of Wings Over Jordan Celebration Chorus" (PDF). College of Fine Arts. Boston University. Archived (PDF) from the original on December 11, 2021 – via TeachingCleveland.org.
- McGee, Isaiah R. (2007). "The Origin and Historical Development of Prominent Professional Black Choirs in the United States" (PDF). College of Music. Florida State University. Archived (PDF) from the original on December 11, 2021 – via FSU Digital Library.
- McNeil, W. K., ed. (2013). Encyclopedia of American Gospel Music. New York: Taylor & Francis Group. ISBN 978-0-415-94179-2. LCCN 2005044994. Archived from the original on December 9, 2021 – via Google Books.
- Price, Madalin Olivia Trigg (1995). Wings Over Jordan and American Radio: 1937-1947. Mass Communication and Journalism (Thesis). University of Southern Mississippi. ProQuest 304215552. Archived from the original on December 13, 2021.
- Williams, Mary Dobbin (2019). ""I'll Be Somewhere Listening For My Name": Wings Over Jordan Choir, The Spirituals, And The African American Experience During The Second World War". College of Arts and Sciences. University of North Carolina at Chapel Hill. Archived from the original on December 11, 2021 – via UNC Carolina Digital Repository.
- Williams, Regennia N.; Brackens, Glenn (2017). "The Wings Over Jordan and the Scholarship of Oral History". The Journal of Traditions & Beliefs. 5 (11). Cleveland State University. Archived from the original on December 13, 2021 – via EngagedScholarship@CSU.
- WGAR, Cleveland's Friendly Station: Personalities (PDF). Peoria, Illinois: National Radio Personalities, Inc. 1939. Archived (PDF) from the original on August 24, 2021 – via World Radio History.
- In re Applications of G.A. Richards, transferor, and Harry J. Klinger, Lawrence P. Fisher and John H. Hannah, transferees, for consent to the transfer of control of KMPC, the Station of the Stars, Inc., Los Angeles, Calif., Docket No. 9402, WJR, the Goodwill Station, Inc., Detroit, Michigan, Docket No. 9403 [and] WGAR Broadcasting Company, Cleveland, Ohio, Docket No. 9404. For renewal of license of Radio Stations KMPC, the Station of the Stars, Inc. ... Docket No. 9468, File No. BR-18, WJR, the Goodwill Station, Inc. ... Docket No. 9469, File No. BR-331 [and] WGAR Broadcasting Company ... Docket No. 9405, File No. BR-283: Exhibits of the WGAR Broadcasting Company (PDF). Vol. 1. Washington, D.C.: Fulton, Walter & Halley. 1948. Archived (PDF) from the original on September 29, 2021 – via World Radio History.
- In re Applications of G.A. Richards, transferor, and Harry J. Klinger, Lawrence P. Fisher and John H. Hannah, transferees, for consent to the transfer of control of KMPC, the Station of the Stars, Inc., Los Angeles, Calif., Docket No. 9402, WJR, the Goodwill Station, Inc., Detroit, Michigan, Docket No. 9403 [and] WGAR Broadcasting Company, Cleveland, Ohio, Docket No. 9404. For renewal of license of Radio Stations KMPC, the Station of the Stars, Inc. ... Docket No. 9468, File No. BR-18, WJR, the Goodwill Station, Inc. ... Docket No. 9469, File No. BR-331 [and] WGAR Broadcasting Company ... Docket No. 9405, File No. BR-283: Exhibits of the WGAR Broadcasting Company (PDF). Vol. 2. Washington, D.C.: Fulton, Walter & Halley. 1948. Archived (PDF) from the original on August 25, 2021 – via World Radio History.

== Documentaries ==
- Rambo, Steve (December 31, 1988). Wings Over Jordan, We Remember (Television production). Produced and written by Dianne Bartlow Watkins and Pam Robinson. Los Angeles, California: KCBS-TV. OCLC 28997150.
