= Willard Hill =

American rapper (born 1982)

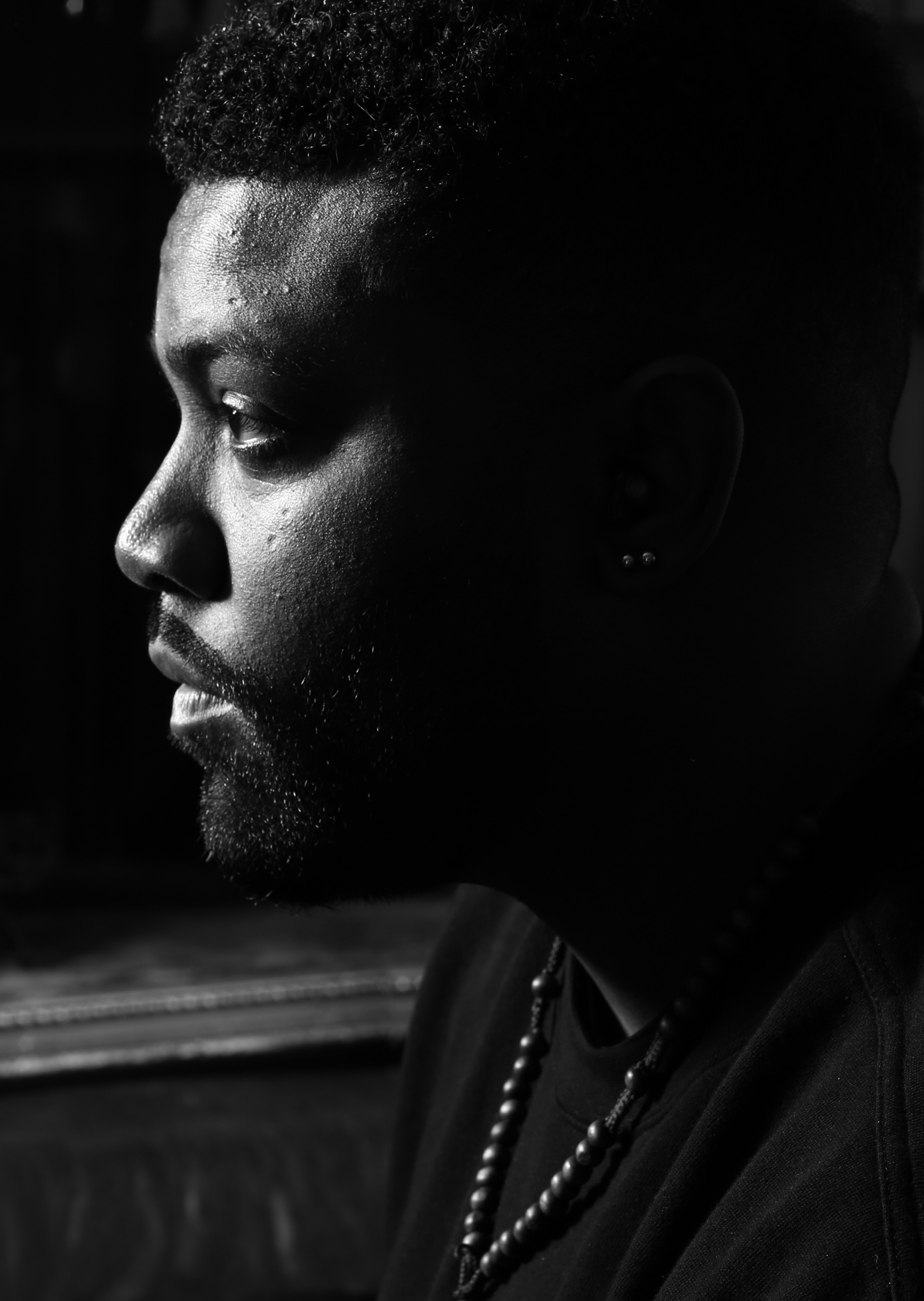

Background information
- Also known as: Will Hill
- Born: Willard Hill, III; June 8, 1982 (age 44); Atlanta, Georgia, US
- Origin: New Orleans, Louisiana, US
- Genres: Hip hop, soul, jazz, R&B
- Occupations: Rapper, Singer-Songwriter, Producer, Composer
- Instruments: Vocals, Keyboards, Guitar, Bass Guitar, Drums/Percussion
- Years active: 2006 – Present
- Label: Independent
- Website: www.willardhill.com

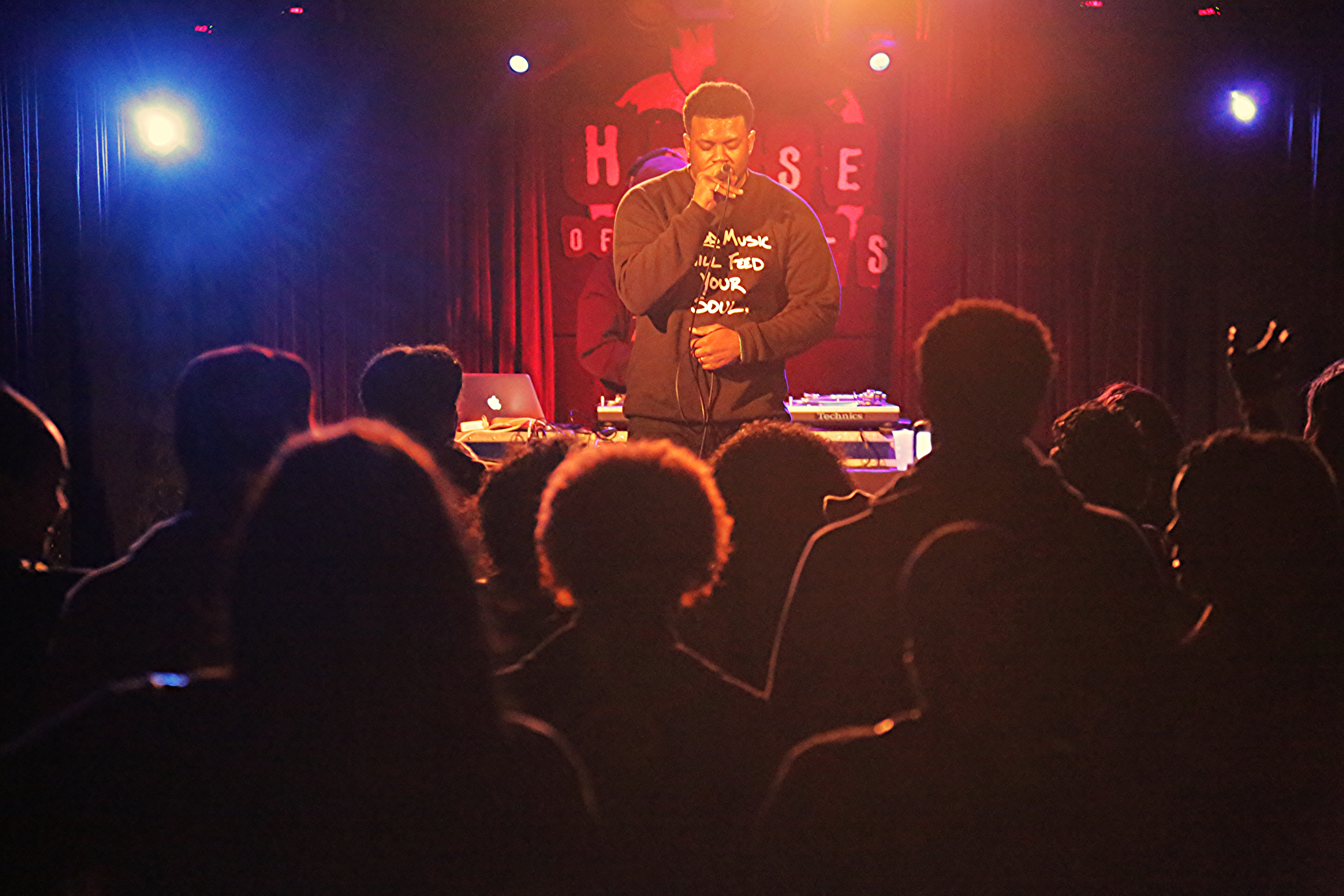
Hill at the House of Blues

Willard Hill (born June 8, 1982 in Atlanta, Georgia) is an American rapper, singer-songwriter, and producer from New Orleans, Louisiana. Hill got his start in song writing and producing working with Wyclef Jean and Jerry Wonda after moving to New York City in 2008. He currently lives in Los Angeles and works on music and film compositions.

== Early life ==
Born in Atlanta, Georgia, to parents Manuella Francois Hill and Willard Hill Jr., Hill's family moved back to their hometown of New Orleans in 1985 where he subsequently grew up. Although no members of his immediate family ever pursued careers as recording artists, they were all musically inclined in their own way. His mother sang with Moses Hogan and traveled with his choir, his grandmother sang and directed the Wings Over Jordan Choir and received her master's degree in music from Louisiana State University, and both his father and grandfather sang and played various instruments. At an early age, he became interested in music and received piano lessons from his grandmother until she died when he was eight years old. He continued to play the piano by ear and began playing the alto saxophone in his elementary school band, but lost interest as he got older.

== Education ==
In 1996, Hill attended St. Augustine High School (New Orleans) because of his fascination with their "Marching 100" band, but ventured into varsity sports. Although he earned starting positions on both the track and football teams, he decided to shift his focus to music and turned down collegiate athletic scholarships to attend Howard University to study Jazz Voice and Audio Production.

== Music career ==
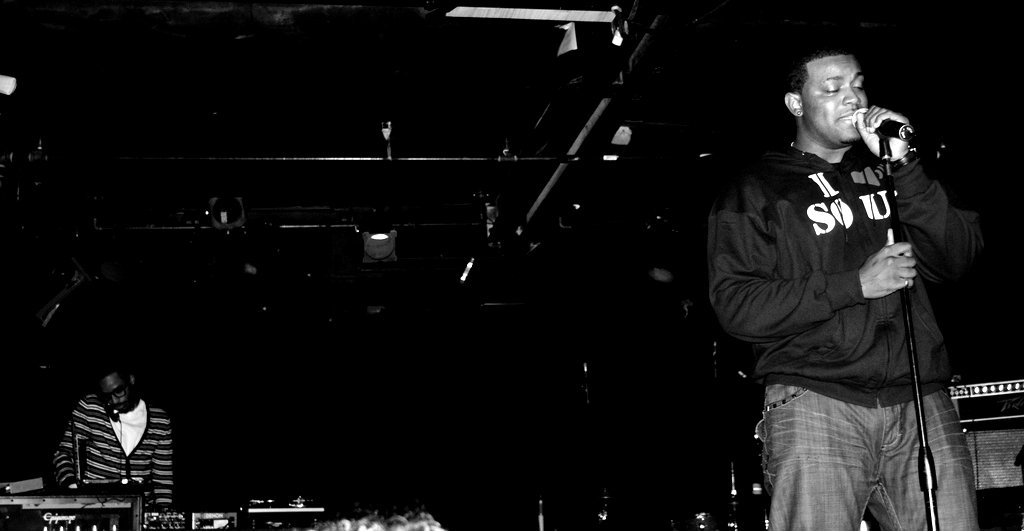
Hill on stage at Southpaw in Brooklyn

While in college, he began to perform as a vocalist and made a name for himself on campus. Hill decided to leave Washington, D.C., in 2004 and return home to work and attend Loyola University New Orleans to study Music Business. Subsequently, Hurricane Katrina and Hurricane Rita forced him to evacuate to Cleveland, Ohio. While in Cleveland, he was featured on the cover of John Carroll University magazine playing the piano for the school's new president. He performed for the president's inauguration dinner as well as other school functions.

Later that year he returned to New Orleans in 2006 and began working and writing articles for Nola.com's Music and Culture sections.

Around this time he met rapper and producer William Kendrick (stage name "ill Will the Champ") through a mutual friend, and became interested in rapping. He recorded his first mixtape Ramblin's of an Outer Child, Inner Man, using the instrumental versions of popular songs. After returning to New Orleans, post Hurricane Katrina, Hill sustained an eye injury while playing basketball and required major surgery. He had to move in with his father who had evacuated to Cleveland, Ohio. His father bought him an Akai MPC 1000 to give him something to do while he recovered and he began making beats in their apartment.

After leaving New Orleans to return to Cleveland, OH he decided to finish his Audio Production degree at Howard University. While in Washington, D.C., he met Wyclef Jean and Jerry Wonda at a panel discussion on Haiti and got into an impromptu freestyle session with other students and Jean. Later, he told them of his music and plans to move to New York City and they each gave him their phone numbers. After moving to New York, in 2008, he briefly interned at Quad Recording Studios before being hired at Wyclef and Jerry Wonda's "Platinum Sound Studios".

While working for Jean and Wonda he began to slowly make his way into recording sessions and began to write as well as play keyboard and bass, which he picked up from Jerry Wonda. After leaving Platinum Sound Studios in pursuit of more opportunities, he began making his rounds around NYC as a session musician and writer. Around this time, he also began freelancing as a Sound Designer and Mix/Recording Engineer for TV and Film. He later became Pro Tools certified in Music to learn how to produce music.

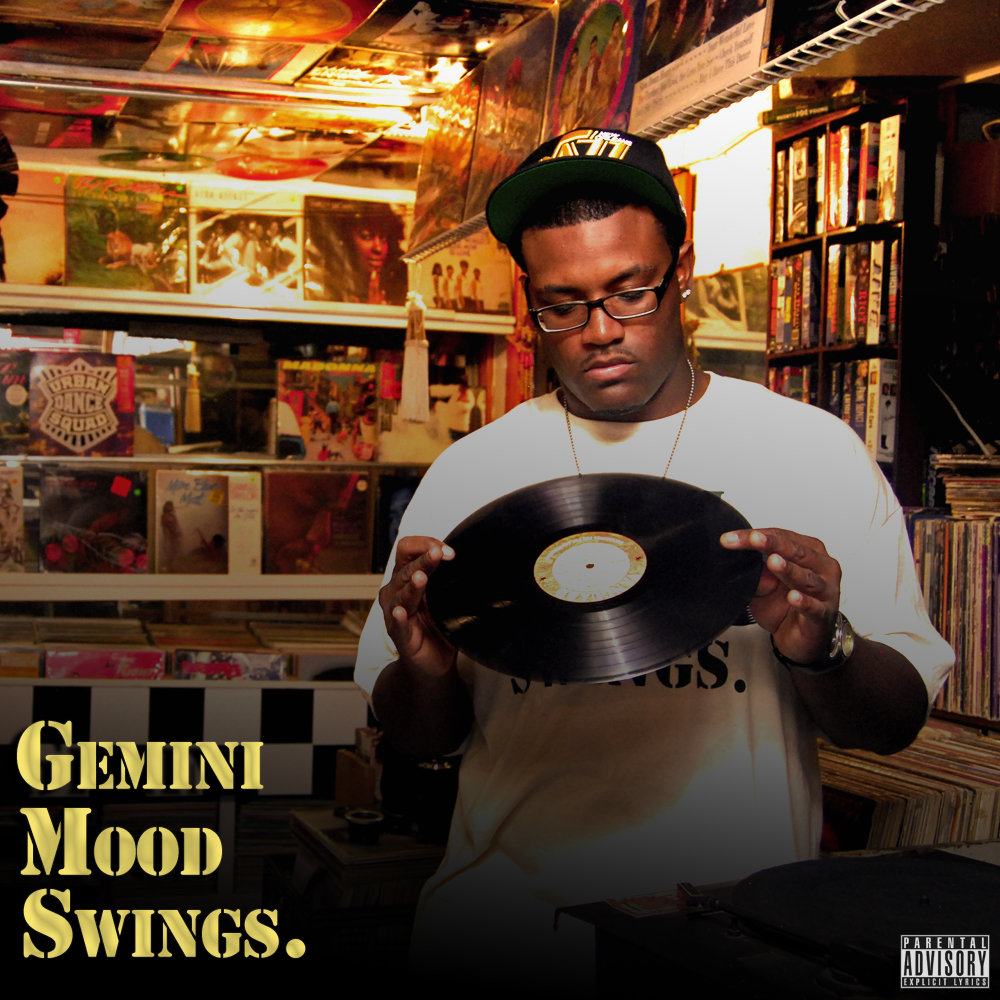
Gemini Mood Swings

In 2010, he quit his job and decided to focus solely on music. He built a home studio and began working on his concept album Gemini Mood Swings. He also decided to get back to his singing roots by taking vocal lessons with vocal coach Ankh Ra Amenhetep, who was featured on Making The Band 4. After commercially releasing his first single Future Fresh, he began performing around NYC and garnered the attention of several U.S. record labels as well as one European label, but chose to keep sole ownership of his music instead of signing a contract.

His single Future Fresh caught the attention of New Orleans radio mainstay Wild Wayne who put the song in rotation during his live web/radio broadcast 504 Radio on WQUE-FM. In 2012, Hill decided to return to New Orleans to further develop his sound and fully incorporate the city's musical influences into his production style. After a brief period in New Orleans he began to travel once more, landing in Los Angeles, California, as well as Atlanta, Georgia, to work with various artists and producers.

On February 27, 2015, Hill independently released his second project, Sketches of Spain Street.

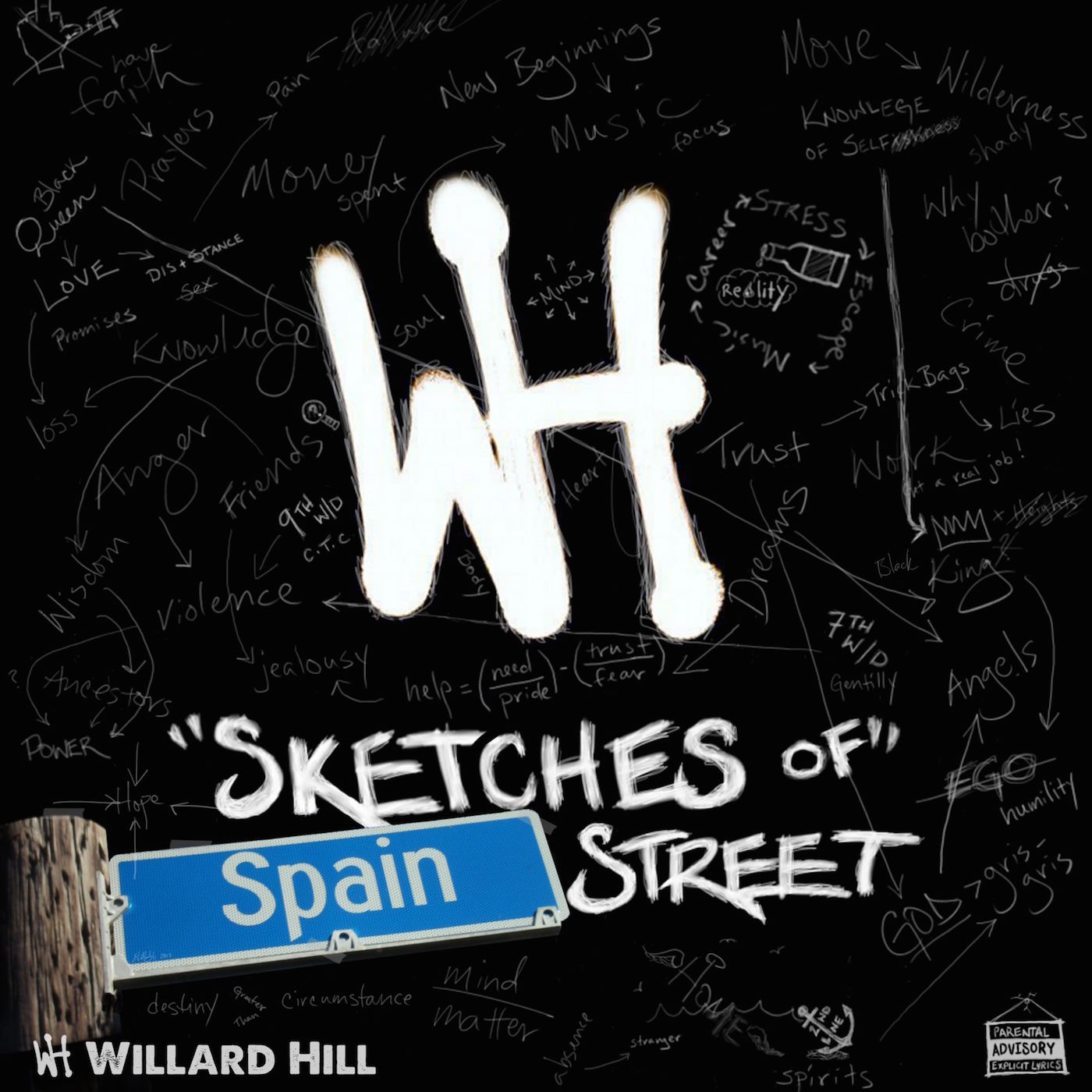
Sketches of Spain Street

== Discography ==
Albums

- Gemini Mood Swings (2011)
- Sketches of Spain Street (2015)
- Untitled/TBA (2018)

Singles

- "Future Fresh" (2011)
- "Requiem For A Queen" (2014)
- "Self-Made King" (2014)
- "To Miss New Orleans" ft. Asante Amin (2015)

Mixtapes

- Ramblin's of an Outer Child, Inner Man (2006)

== Personal life ==
Hill began delving further into music in 1997, after several family tragedies caused him to focus more on his emotional needs. In December 1997, his grandfather died at home while Hill watched as his father tried to resuscitate him. A week later, his father suffered kidney failure and had to receive emergency dialysis. Later that year, Hill's mother was diagnosed with Early Onset Alzheimer's Disease and needed constant care. Hill's mother passed in 2013. He has one sibling, an older sister.

In 2014, he married filmmaker and producer Quan Lateef. The two were married in Paris, France and their pictures were featured on Glamour.com.

Hill said he uses various forms of art and music to find creative inspiration and is also a multi-instrumentalist. Hill also designs his own cover art, merchandise, and solo show fliers for fun. He says Bob Marley and Quincy Jones are his biggest musical influences.
