= Stuart Goldman =

American journalist

- Occupations: Journalist; author; screenwriter
- Father: Maurice Goldman
- Musical career
- Genres: Country; Jewish music

Stuart Goldman is an American journalist, author, and screenwriter. A former critic for the Los Angeles Times and the Los Angeles Daily News, he later penned a column for the Los Angeles Reader.

== Career ==
Goldman's early career initially found him writing for left-wing papers and magazines. He was one of the original staffers for the LA Weekly. However, Goldman ultimately emerged as a conservative journalist whose pieces frequently appeared in National Review and other right-wing journals. Over the years, his pieces have appeared in numerous publications, including Los Angeles, Rolling Stone, Penthouse, Esquire, Vanity Fair, and California Lawyer. In addition, his syndicated column appeared in newspapers throughout the U.S. and Europe.

For over three years, Goldman contributed a weekly column to WorldNetDaily. According to editor Joseph Farah, Goldman's column generated more reader responses than any other columnist on the conservative website.

In 1989, Goldman embarked upon a three-year undercover investigation of the tabloid industry, both print and television. Using the pseudonym Wil Runyon (one of the many identities he has employed over the years), he spent three years as a "mole", with the goal of exposing them as a "criminal organization". He enlisted the help of former FBI agent Ted Gunderson and threat assessor Gavin de Becker in writing his story. When he completed his investigation, Goldman wrote an article for Spy. After a heated bidding war, Goldman sold the rights to his story to Phoenix Pictures, who attached Oliver Stone to direct the feature film.

== Musical career ==
Goldman was raised in a family of classical musicians. Goldman's father is the composer/conductor/arranger Maurice Goldman, primarily recognized for his contribution to the world of Yiddish music. Goldman's mother, Ethel Goldman, was, at age 18, the youngest flautist to play in the Cleveland Philharmonic Orchestra.

In his youth, Goldman studied the piano, cello, and trumpet. While in college, Goldman became enamored with the pedal steel guitar. Over the following ten years, Goldman performed and recorded with numerous artists, including Hoyt Axton, Steve Goodman, Doc Watson, Tanya Tucker, Phil Everly, Clarence Gatemouth Brown, Jo-El Sonnier, Garth Hudson, Leon Russell, and Albert Lee.

Goldman toured the U.S. and Europe with former Kingston Trio member John Stewart and Cajun fiddler Doug Kershaw. Prior to quitting the music scene, Goldman played several concerts as a member of the Texas Jewboys, a backup band for country singer and writer Kinky Friedman.

== Current work ==
Goldman's current work combines journalism with his rekindled interest in Judaism—in particular, the world of Jewish music.

The project was born after Goldman discovered that his father's entire musical collection had disappeared after it was loaned to an alleged "charitable" organization. In the course of trying to locate his father's Music, Goldman discovered that the collections of a number of other well-known Jewish musical composers were also missing. Eight years later, what Goldman had thought would be a magazine article had become a book.

Goldman has released a book composed of 40 years of his writing, both fiction and non-fiction. The book's title is "Adventures In Manic Depression". Although he states he's "living with the condition since nine years old", his book is not about the topic of manic depression.

== Works ==
=== Non-fiction ===
- Confessions of a Poison Pen Artist, 1986
- With Malice For All, 1986
- The Art Of Verbal Self-Defense, 1987
- Letters To A Letter Junkie, 1988
- Secrets Of The Supersnoopers, 1995
- Snitch: Confessions Of A Tabloid Spy, 1998
- "Adventures In Manic Depression: Tales In Fine Madness", 2013

=== Fiction ===
- Adventures In Manic Depression: Tales In Fine Madness,2013

=== Children's books ===
- Hags: A Tale Of Teenage Witchcraft, 1995
- " Night Of The Crones", 2012

=== Short story collections ===
- Excitable Boy, 2002

=== Screenplays ===
- The Bouncer, 1992
- The Great Pretender, 1990
- Spy Vs. Spies, 1994

=== Cartoons ===
- The Adventures Of Phobia Man, 1980–1992
- The Great Vomit Bus, 1985

=== Ghostwriter ===
- The Franklin Conspiracy, 1990

=== Editor ===
- Murder Book: Investigation Of The Murder Of Anthony Brancato and Anthony Trombino: Los Angeles Police Department., DR 880-680, November 29, 1951
- Runnin' With The Big Dogs, by Jane Getz, 2014
