= Evelyn Freeman Roberts =

- Born: Gertrude Evelyn Freeman; February 13, 1919; Cleveland, Ohio, U.S.
- Died: May 5, 2017 (aged 98)
- Genres: Swing; classical; gospel; spirituals; R&B
- Occupations: Bandleader; choir leader; arranger; composer; volunteer; advocate
- Instrument: Piano
- Years active: 1938–2017

Evelyn Freeman Roberts (February 13, 1919 – May 5, 2017) was an American musician, songwriter, arranger and educator. After an early career as a swing band and gospel choir leader, she and her husband, Tommy Roberts, established the Young Saints foundation for young performers in Los Angeles.

== Biography ==
She was born Gertrude Evelyn Freeman in Cleveland, Ohio, the daughter of Gertrude Evelyn (née Richardson) and Ernest Aaron Freeman. Her younger brother Ernie Freeman later became a successful composer and arranger on many records between the 1950s and 1970s. Evelyn and Ernie performed as members of The Freeman Family, and she also played piano in a classical ensemble. After meeting Duke Ellington after a performance, she decided that she wanted to become a bandleader, and studied at the Cleveland Institute of Music. In 1938, she formed her own swing band, before graduating in 1941.

Her orchestra, the Evelyn Freeman Swing Band, which also included her brother Ernie, performed regularly at the Circle Ballroom, Oster's Ballroom, and on radio station WHK, until many of its members were recruited by the US Navy. They became the first African-American Navy band, stationed in Indiana, and were nicknamed the "Gobs of Swing." Freeman herself continued to perform with a smaller group, which included Ben "Bull Moose" Jackson. After the end of World War II, she met Tommy Roberts, who had been a featured soloist in the Cleveland-based Wings Over Jordan Choir since its 1935 inception. Tommy recruited Evelyn to help compose material for the a cappella spiritual choir at the start of a postwar tour, but was fired several months later by Rev. Glynn T. Settle as her popularity quickly rivaled his; Tommy left the choir at the same time. They married and moved to New York City and began performing in the city's nightclubs scene, associating with Lionel Hampton, Ethel Waters and Cab Calloway, in addition to arranging for vaudeville acts.

In the late 1950s, she reformed the Evelyn Freeman Orchestra with new members, and it backed such singers as Peggy Lee and Frankie Laine in Las Vegas. She also wrote "The Jelly Coal Man", recorded by Laine in 1959. She released a rock and roll single credited to Evelyn Freeman and The Exciting Voices, "Let's Make A Little Motion" / "Come To Me My True Love", on the Dot label in 1958; both tracks were co-written by Freeman and Roberts. This was followed by the gospel-inspired album Sky High on Imperial Records in 1960. In 1962, the single "Didn't It Rain" was issued on the small Bel Canto label before being reissued by the United Artists label, and the ensemble also recorded with singer Earl Nelson. In the mid-1960s, she moved to Los Angeles. She continued to work as a composer and arranger for television, as well as for performers including Bing Crosby, Dean Martin and Louis Prima, and ran her own club, "The Upstairs" on Sunset Strip.

With her husband, Tommy Roberts, she also established The Young Saints Scholarships Foundation, a nonprofit organization incorporated in 1967, with the aim of providing free training in singing, dance, drama, television work and associated skills for young people, aged between 5 and 21, in South Central Los Angeles. In 1970, the Young Saints performed for President Richard Nixon in the White House under Freeman Roberts' direction. In 1989, it was reported that the Young Saints had about 150 participants. In 1993, Evelyn and Tommy Roberts received the Community Service Award in the Sixth Annual NAACP Theater Awards. Evelyn and Tommy's protégés included Herb Alpert, along with members of The 5th Dimension and The Friends of Distinction.

Freeman Roberts died in June 2017 at the age of 98. She died on her grandson-in-law's birthday.

Her family members include Ethan Charles Noah Roberts, born on April 27, 2007, and Darius Jeremiah Thomas Roberts, born on June 12, 2006.
