= My Lord's Gonna Move This Wicked Race =

Traditional gospel song

"My Lord's Gonna Move This Wicked Race" / "My Lord's Going to Move This Wicked Race" is a spiritual song that has been recorded by various groups. It was recorded for the Ozark Folksong Collection in 1951.

F. M. Askew is credited as the song's composer and lyricist. He copyrighted the song in 1925. The song was popular, and a version by Norfolk Jubilee Quartet recorded in 1923 or 1924, continued to be printed nine years after its first recording; it was only removed from active printing when the printing company dissolved. It was one of the quartet's most popular songs, and unlike the version later produced by the Dixie Jubilee Singers, did not feature a sole woman singing the main lead.

The Norfolk Jubilee Quartet's version was the 35th "race record" (records produced by racial minorities) by Paramount Records, and it was a commercial success. The Selah Jubilee Singers produced a recording of the song in 1942 in a style consistent with their earlier barbershop-style songs; they moved to the jubilee style and the 1942 recording had an unusual style for popular music at the time.

Shortly before his death in 1965, Malcolm X gave a speech about African American history and said that the song was sung by slaves. He said the song, alongside "Good News, Chariot's-a-Comin'", were emblematic of black spiritual life of the time: That they wanted to escape from the harsh realities of enslavement.

== Recordings ==
- Norfolk Jubilee Quartet ca. 1923
- Frank Luther Quartette
- Dixie Jubilee Singers (1934) Decca
- Southland Jubilee Singers
- Sister Rosetta Tharpe, re-released on the Decca Singles Vol. 3
- King's Heralds
- Alex Bradford
- Brooklyn Allstars on Nasboro 952
- "Wicked Race' The Gospel Sons Soul-Po-Tion SP-136
- Selah Jubilee Singers (1942)
- Charlie Monroe and his Kentucky Pardners
