= Maurice Goldman (composer) =

American composer and conductor (1910–1984)

Maurice Goldman (1910–1984) was an internationally known composer and conductor. Goldman’s compositions and arrangements are largely in the areas of Yiddish and Hebraic music. However, like his mentors, Ernest Bloch and Aaron Copland, Goldman’s music breaks the boundaries of traditional Jewish melodies, employing chordal and harmonic elements found in classical, jazz, and American folk music.

Goldman was born on April 20 in Philadelphia, Pennsylvania. Soon thereafter, his family relocated to Cleveland Ohio, where his father, Marcus Goldman worked as a rabbi.

Goldman’s musical talent appeared early in life. He was already singing, playing piano and composing original music at the age of five.

Goldman attended Glenville High School in Cleveland, where he served as head of the Choral Department. At this stage, he worked largely as a singer, lending his rich baritone voice to performances of various pieces, including Handel’s “Invocation To Music” and “So Fahr Ich Hin,” a motet by Heinrich Schütz.

Goldman went on to study at Case Western Reserve University in Cleveland. It was at Western Reserve where he met his wife-to-be, Ethel Mann, a gifted flutist who would go on to play with the Cleveland Philharmonic Orchestra.

At age 26, Goldman became the youngest person to conduct a concert at Cleveland’s famed Severance Hall. On that first night, Goldman received a standing ovation.

That same year, Goldman won a scholarship to attend a conducting workshop at The Berkshire School Of Music, located in Tanglewood Massachusetts. Goldman worked under the tutelage of Serge Koussevitzky, conductor of the Boston Symphony Orchestra. While at Tanglewood, Goldman worked alongside several of his heroes, including Ernest Bloch, Aaron Copland, and Paul Hindemith.

During his early years in Cleveland, Goldman served as the director of the Akron Opera Company and the Cleveland Jewish Singing Society. He directed the Opera Department at the Cleveland Institute of Music, served as the choral director at Euclid Avenue Temple, and the Vocal Director at the Cleveland Music School Settlement. Goldman also served as the cantor at Fairmont Temple and Temple On The Heights. Additionally, he hosted two highly popular Cleveland radio programs, Operama (WHK radio) and Classics In Wax.

Goldman divided his time between composing, arranging and conducting. While still in his 20s, he conducted a number of operas, including Die Meistersinger, Rape Of The Lucretia, and Parsifal.

== California ==
In the early 40s, Goldman traveled to California, where he had been offered a job scoring films. His work in Hollywood ran the gamut of genres, ranging from cowboy movies -- The Old Spanish Trail, (starring Roy Rogers), Wild Heritage, The Bells Of San Angelo, Down Laredo Way—to dramas. Goldman’s most famous score was written for the Film noir classic, Lady In The Lake, which starred Robert Montgomery as detective Philip Marlowe.

== Judaic music ==
Despite the lure of Hollywood, Goldman’s real love remained in the world of traditional Yiddish music. He moved back to Cleveland in the early Fifties, where he immersed himself in that genre.

== The Golden Door ==
In 1955, Goldman composed his largest work thus far, a cantata entitled The Golden Door, which was written to celebrate the Jewish Tercentenary (the 300th year of Jewish settlement in the United States). The text to the cantata was written by famed radio biographer Norman Corwin.

While in Cleveland, Goldman composed a cantata entitled "Al Nahros Bovel" (“By The Waters Of Babylon).” Based on the 137th Psalm, the piece was one of many Goldman works which were rooted in the bible.

Goldman returned to California in 1957. In Los Angeles, he served as the musical director for The Bureau of Jewish Education. He also headed up the Los Angeles Opera Company and served as the cantor at University Synagogue.

Despite living in a town which lacked the color and spirit of Cleveland, Goldman continued to compose a multitude songs and cantatas. Despite numerous offers, he refused to return to the film industry.

The closest Goldman got to the "entertainment business" was when he composed the music for an event entitled Action For Humanity. The purpose for the evening was to raise funds for Bonds For Israel. The speakers on the program included film stars Myrna Loy, Edward G. Robinson, Vincent Price, Melvyn Douglas and Glenn Ford. On that evening. which took place at the Hollywood Bowl, Goldman conducted a 42-piece orchestra which was augmented by a 150-voice chorus.

== Echoes of Yiddish Life ==
In 1983, Goldman contracted cancer. Despite immense physical pain, he continued to sit at the piano for hours on end, determined to complete what would be his most ambitious composition to date.

Echoes Of Yiddish Life dealt with the trials of the Jews throughout the centuries. The cantata included 10 original pieces. The most famed of these was “The Machine Song.” The tune depicts the blighted life of a poverty stricken man who works night and day (“I work and I work and I am a machine.”).

Echoes Of Yiddish Life debuted in February 1984. Though Goldman was too ill to attend the opening nights’ performance, he was able to view a tape of the concert from his hospital bed.

Surrounded by friends and family, Goldman died on February 4, 1984. He left behind him his wife Ethel, his son Stuart Goldman and his daughter Althea.

Some 24 years since his passing, Goldman’s works continue to be performed throughout the world. Like his mentors Ernest Bloch and Aaron Copland, Goldman is regarded as a man who created a new form in the world of Yiddish Music.

== Compositions ==
Film Scores

- Bells Of San Angelo
- On The Old Spanish Trail
- Wild Heritage
- Down Laredo Way
- Lady In The Lake

Television Scores

- Witchcraft In Salem (Omnibus)

Musical Comedy

- “Two In Love” (from the musical comedy, Are You Ticklish

Theatre

- The Dybbuk

Songs, Arrangements, choral works, Cantatas, Liturgical music

- "Song Of Ruth" (Entreat Me Not To Leave Thee)
- "Song Of The Palmach"
- "Al Naaros Bovel"
- "Y’sham Ru"
- "Kaddish"
- "O Mighty Hand" ("Dor Nifla")
- I Am My Beloved’s
- "Kol Dodi"
- "The Rich And The Poor"
- "In Days Of Awe"
- "Lecha Dodi"
- "Hymn Of Praise"(Psalm 117)
- "Let The Word Go Forth"
- "Eitz Chayim"
- "Haskivenu"
- "Almighty And Everlasting God"
- "Anachnu"
- "Sabbath Eve Service"
- "Tower In The Sky"
- "Unto Thee O Lord Do I Call"
- "Lament S’Arriana"
- Friday Evening Service
- "The Lord Is My Light"
- "Dos Maie Lied"
- "Little Boy Lost"
- "Little Boy Found"
- "The Machine Song"
- "Strange Happenings"("Holiday Calamities Of Avrymele Melamed")
- "Ha Va Nagila"
- "Christmas Lullaby"
- "Kalenka"
- "Ma Tai Yavo"
- "Hava Nevtzey B’Machol "("Come And Join In Dance")
- "Zum Gali"
- "Night And Dreams"
- "La Danza"
- "How Good It Is"
- "Golden Slumbers"
- "Ya Ba Bom "("There Shall Be Peace")
- "Lasciatmei Morire"
- "Merry Christmas Song"
- "O’ May The Words"
- "Thanks Be To Thee"
- "Tchum Be Ri Tchum"
- "Forever Blessed Be Thy Name"
- "Ode Of Thanksgiving"
- "A Jubilant Christmas Carol"
- "Turn Ye To Me"
- "O Lord Hear Thou My Prayer"
- "Lullaby To The Christ Child"
- "Zum Gali" ("Dance The Hora")
- "Lameedbar" ("To The Desert")
- "Matai Yavo" ("When Will He Come")
- "Simple Gifts"
- "Mary’s Cradle Song"
- "The Little Sandman"
- "O Lord, Give Ear"
- "I Love Thee"
- "Forever Blessed Be Thy Name"
- "Cradle Song To The Holy Infant"
- "Prayer"
- "The Virgin Mary Wandered"
- "Sweet Shepardess, Addio"
- "Beside The Golden Door"
- "Sleep, Little Jesus, Sleep"
- "A Choral Etude"
- "Song Of The Little Fairies"
- "For Jefferson And Liberty"
- "Turn Ye To Me"
- "Great Is Jehovah"
- "On Christmas Night"
- "Almighty And Everlasting God"
- "O Sleep Thou Heavenly Child"
- "Christmas Lullaby"
- "How Good It Is" ("He-Nay-Ma-Tov")
- "Song Without Words"
- "Kol Nidre"
- "Forever Blessed Be Thy Name"
- "Matai Yavo"
- "The Virgin Mary Wandered"
- "The Girl With The Flaxen Hair"
- "Thanks Be To Thee"
- "Night And Dreams"
- "Avot Olam"
- "R’Tzay Veem Bi Cha Taynu"
- "The Miller’s Tears"
- "Near The Tiny Hearth"
- "The Poet’s Soliloquy"
- "Our Farewell"
- "Pick The Christmas Ripe"
- "Lasciatmei Mi Morire" ("O Leave Me Here")
- "O Wondrous Harmony"
- "O Tschum Biri Tschum"
- "Sandannchen"
- "Christmas Lullaby"
- "Ma Tovu"
- "Jerusalem" ("A Rejoicing Unto Nations")
- "Hava Netzy B’Machol"
- "Natasyavo"
- "La Midbar "
- "A Dudele"
- "Yankele"

Compositions in the Roger Wagner Chorale Series

- "Echoes Of Yiddish Life"
- "Beside The Golden Door"
- "O Wondrous Harmony
- "Seep Little Jesus Sleep"
- "Song To The Moon"
- "Tchum Bi Ri Tchum"
- "The Virgin Mary Wandered"
- "Avot "(excerpt from Friday Night Service)
- "R’Tzeh Vim Nu Cha Te Nu" (excerpt from Shabbat Service)
- "Kol Nidre"
- "Great Is Jehovah"
- "Night And Dreams"
