= Apollo (disambiguation) =

Apollo is a Greek and Roman god of music, healing, light, prophecy and enlightenment.

Apollo may also refer to:

== Animals ==
- Apollo (dog) (1992–2006), a German Shepherd search and rescue dog
- Apollo (horse) (1879–1887), an American Thoroughbred racehorse
- Apollo (parrot) (hatched 2020), an African grey parrot
- Parnassius, a genus of swallowtail butterflies commonly known as the Apollos; in particular
  - Parnassius apollo, a Parnassius butterfly found in Europe commonly known as the Apollo
  - Parnassius autocrator, a Parnassius butterfly found in Afghanistan and Taj

== Arts, entertainment and media ==
=== Fictional entities ===
- In the Battlestar Galactica universe:
  - Lee Adama, a character in the 2004 re-imagining of Battlestar Galactica
  - Captain Apollo, a character in the original Battlestar Galactica television series
- Apollo (DC Comics), a character in Wildstorm Comics' The Authority
- Apollo (Marvel Comics), a comic book character
- Apollo (Saint Seiya), a character in the fictional universe of Masami Kurumada's manga Saint Seiya
- Apollo (Star Trek), an alien in the Star Trek episode "Who Mourns for Adonais?"
- Apollo, a character in the musical TV series Pajanimals
- Apollo, a character in The Amory Wars comic book series
- Apollo, a character in the Zatch Bell! anime/manga series
- Apollo Candy, a fictional candy bar in the Lost television series
- Apollo Creed, a boxer played by Carl Weathers in the Rocky film series
- Apollo Justice, a character in Capcom's Ace Attorney video-game series
- USS Apollo, a BC-304 class deep space carrier in Stargate: Atlantis; see List of Earth starships in Stargate
- USS Apollo (NCC-1725), a starship in the video game Starfleet Academy
- USS Apollo (NCC-17706), a starship in Star Trek: Legacy and Star Trek: The Next Generation Role-playing Game

=== Music ===
==== Groups and labels ====
- Apollo (band), an American R&B/disco group that recorded for Motown Records in the late 1970s
- Apollo Records (1921), US label
- Apollo Records (1928), US label
- Apollo Records (1944), US label
- Apollo Records (Belgium), Belgian label

==== Albums ====
- Apollo (Nebula album), 2006
- Apollo, by the group Stockholm Syndrome
- Apollo (Fireboy DML album), 2020
- Apollo: Atmospheres and Soundtracks, 1983, by Brian Eno

==== Songs ====
- "Apollo" (Porno Graffitti song), 1999
- "Apollo" (Timebelle song), the Swiss entrant in the Switzerland in the Eurovision Song Contest 2017
- "Apollo" (Hardwell song), 2012
- "Apollo", 1984, by Orchestral Manoeuvres in the Dark from Junk Culture

=== Literature ===
- Apollo (journal), Arabic journal
- Apollo (magazine), British arts magazine

=== Other uses in arts, entertainment and media ===
- Apollo (ballet), 1928 George Balanchine choreography for Stravinsky's Apollon musagète
- Showtime at the Apollo, an American music television series
- Apollo (Michelangelo), marble sculpture
- Apollo Gauntlet, an American animated television series on Adult Swim
- Prix Apollo Award (late 20th century), for French for science-fiction literature
- Apollo (System Copernicus), a stained glass window
- "Apollo" (Endeavour), a television episode

== Businesses and organisations ==
=== Brands and enterprises ===
- Apollo, a deodorant product by Axe/Lynx
- Apollo (candy) (Korean: 아폴로), a South Korean candy brand
- Apollo oil refinery, a Nazi Germany facility in the Oil campaign of World War II
- Apollo Cinemas, chain
- Apollo Computer Inc., a workstation manufacturer, founded in 1980, and acquired in 1989 by Hewlett-Packard Company
- Apollo Diamond, an American diamond-manufacturing company
- Apollo Global Management, private equity investment firm
- Apollo Education Group, a company specializing in adult education
- Apollo Hospitals, a healthcare group in India
- Apollo Theatre (disambiguation), several uses, including "Apollo Theater"
- Apollo Tyres, an Indian tyre manufacturer
- Apollo Ultralight Aircraft, a Hungarian microlight aircraft manufacturer
- Apollo-Optik, an optics company
- Games by Apollo, a third-party video game developer for the Atari 2600
- Hammersmith Apollo, entertainment venue in London

=== Education ===
- Apollo Junior High School of Richardson, Texas
- Carrington College (US), a privately held higher education organization, known before June 2010 as Apollo College

=== Organizations ===
- Apollo University Lodge, the principal Masonic Lodge of the University of Oxford

== Military ==
- Apollo-class cruiser of the Royal Navy
- Apollo-class frigate, Royal Navy sailing frigates
- HMS Apollo, various Royal Navy ships
- USS Apollo (AS-25), a 1943 US Navy submarine tender

== People ==
- Apollos (1st-century A.D.), Alexandrian Jewish-Christian
- Apollo (4th century A.D.), Coptic ascetic and martyr associated with Abib
- Apollo (monk), Egyptian Christian monk
- Steve Apollo (born 1949), pseudonym of illustrator Jim Starlin
- Dale Cook (born 1958), known as Apollo, American kickboxer
- Apollo Crews (born 1987), American professional wrestler
- Apollo Faye (born 1951), French basketball player
- Apollo Kironde (1915–2007), Ugandan ambassador
- Apollo Korzeniowski (1820–1869), Polish writer, and father of Joseph Conrad
- Apolo Ohno (born 1982), American skating medalist
- Apollo Papathanasio (born 1969), vocalist of Greek power metal band Firewind
- Apollo Perelini (born 1969), New Zealand rugby player
- Apollo Quiboloy (born 1950), Filipino televangelist
- Apollo Robbins (born 1974), American sleight-of-hand artist and deception specialist
- Apollo M. O. Smith (1911–1997), American rocket scientist
- Apollo Soucek (1897–1955), American test pilot and vice admiral

== Places ==
=== Extraterrestrial ===
- Apollo (crater), a basin on the far side of the Moon
- 1862 Apollo, a near-Earth asteroid discovered in 1932
- Apollo asteroids, a group of near-Earth asteroids

=== Terrestrial ===
- Apollo, a town near Johannesburg, South Africa, location of static inverter plant of Cahora Bassa
- Apollo, Georgia, US
- Apollo, Pennsylvania, US
- Apollo Bay, Victoria, Australia
- Apollo Bay, Tasmania, Australia
- Apollo Beach, Florida
- Apollo Bridge, a road bridge over the Danube in Bratislava
- Apollo Temple, a summit in the Grand Canyon, U.S.

== Science and technology ==
- Apache Point Observatory Lunar Laser-ranging Operation (APOLLO), an observatory in New Mexico
- Apollo program, a series of American space missions that ultimately landed men on the Moon
- Acute hemorrhagic conjunctivitis, referred to colloquially in Ghana as "Apollo"
- Apollo (cable system), a cable crossing the Atlantic Ocean
- Apollo, the code name of Apple's Macintosh Classic II
- Apollo, the code name of Windows Phone 8, Microsoft's smartphone operating system
- Adobe Integrated Runtime, a cross-OS runtime system originally codenamed "Apollo"
- Apollo/Domain, a series of workstations made by Apollo Computer
- Apollo Reservation System, the computerized central reservation system developed by United Airlines
- Apollo (app), a third-party Reddit client for iOS and iPadOS

== Sports ==
- Apollo 55, professional wrestling tag team
- Apollo of Temple, now Philadelphia sports venue Liacouras Center
- Orlando Apollos, an American football team in the Alliance of American Football

== Transportation ==
=== Automobiles ===
- Apollo (1906 automobile), an American car made from 1906 to 1907
- Apollo (1910 automobile), a German car built from 1910 to 1927
- Apollo (1962 automobile), an American sports car built from 1962 to 1964
- Apollo Automobil, a German sports car manufacturing company
  - Gumpert Apollo, a racing and high-performance sports car produced by Apollo Automobil
- Apolong, or Baidu Apollo project, a driverless vehicle developed by Baidu
- Holden Apollo, manufactured by Toyota and sold by Holden in Australia from 1989 to 1997
- Volkswagen Apollo, a rebadged version of the Ford Verona automobile sold in Brazil between 1990 and 1992
- Buick Apollo, an American compact car built from 1973 to 1975

=== Ships ===
See List of ships named Apollo

=== Other ===
- Apollo, a steam locomotive of the West Cornwall Railway
- Ducati Apollo, a prototype motorcycle of 1964
- Armstrong Whitworth Apollo, a prototype airliner

== See also ==
- Apollon (disambiguation)
- Apollos, a 1st-century Alexandrian Jewish Christian
- Apolo (disambiguation)
- Appollo (disambiguation)
- Appolo (disambiguation)
- Apollo Sea
