= Apollo (ship) =

Several ships have been named Apollo for the mythical figure of Apollo:

- Apollo (1798 ship) was built in Bermuda. From 1803 she made two voyages as a Liverpool-based slave ship. The French captured her in port at Dominica in 1805.
- Apollo (1812 EIC ship) was launched at Hull. She made three voyages for the British East India Company (EIC) as a regular ship. She continued to trade with India under licence from the EIC until she was wrecked near Cape Town in 1823.
- Apollo (1819 ship) was launched in Bristol as a West Indiaman. New owners in 1838 shifted her homeport to Dundee; she then sailed between Dundee and Montreal. In September 1843 she rescued the crew of a vessel that had foundered. Then in September 1846 a hurricane so damaged her that her crew and passengers abandoned her when two schooners came by and were able to rescue them.
- HMS Royal Scotsman, ship used by the Church of Scientology

== See also ==
- HMS Apollo - any of nine vessels of that name
