= Apollo Theatre (disambiguation) =

Apollo Theatre or Apollo Theater may refer to:

== United Kingdom ==
- Apollo Theatre, in the West End of London
- Apollo Victoria Theatre, in Victoria, London
- Hammersmith Apollo, previously known as the Hammersmith Odeon, in Hammersmith, London
- New Theatre Oxford, formerly known as the Apollo Theatre, in Oxford
- O_{2} Apollo Manchester, formerly known as the Manchester Apollo, in Manchester

== United States ==
- Apollo Theater, in Harlem, New York City
- Apollo Theater Chicago
- Apollo Theatre (Oberlin, Ohio)
- Apollo Theatre (Martinsburg, West Virginia)
- Apollo Theatre (Belvidere, Illinois)
- Apollo Theater (Washington, DC), on H Street NE, now demolished
- Apollo Theatre (42nd Street), Midtown Manhattan, New York City, now demolished
- Nixon's Apollo Theatre, on the Atlantic City Boardwalk, in Atlantic City, New Jersey
- United Artists Theatre (Chicago), originally named the Apollo Theatre, now demolished

== Other ==
- Apollo (Paris), France
- Apollo-Theater (Düsseldorf), Germany
- Apollo-Theater (Siegen), Germany
- Apollo Theatre (film) (Teatro Apolo), a 1950 Spanish musical film about Teatro Apolo (Madrid)
- Teatro Apolo (Lisbon), originally the Teatro do Príncipe Real. Renamed 1910. Closed 1957.
- Teatro Apolo (Madrid), now defunct cinema and subject of Apollo Theatre (film)
- Teatro Apollo Rome, vanished theater in Tor di Nona district
- Apollon Theater, Syros, Greece, opened in 1864
- Apollon Theatre (Patras), Greece

== See also ==
- Apollo Cinemas, UK chain of cinemas
- The Apollo (Glasgow), a former music venue in Glasgow, Scotland, UK
- Coventry Apollo, in Coventry, England, UK, now demolished
- Apollo Music Hall, a former venue in London, England, UK
- es:Teatro Apolo, another extensive list
