= Rialto Records =

Rialto Records may refer to:

- Rialto Records (1920s), the parent company of Apollo Records (1921)
- Rialto Records, a UK label; see, for example Archive Series
