= Apollo Records =

Apollo Records may refer to:

- Apollo Records (1921), US based company
- Apollo Records (1928), US based company
- Apollo Records (1944), US based company
- Apollo Records (Belgium), Belgian-based company
- Apollo Recordings, UK based company
- Apollo Records, Italian company founded by Franco Califano and Edoardo Vianello, active from 1969 to 1974
- Apollo Records, Italian company founded in 2021
