= Apollon =

Apollon may refer to:

- Apollo, ancient Greek god of light, healing and poetry
- Apollon (Formula One), Formula One constructor
- Apollon Kalamarias F.C., Greek football club
- Apollon Smyrnis F.C., a Greek football club from Athens
- Apollon Limassol B.C., Cypriot basketball club
- Apollon Limassol FC, Cypriot football club
- Apollon Musagète, a 1928 ballet by Igor Stravinsky
- Apollon (strongman) (1862–1928), famous 19th-century French strongman
- Apollon (ship), transatlantic luxury liner and cruise ship
- Apollon (GUI), a giFT front-end
- Apollon Patras, a sporting club
- Apollon, Norwegian popular science magazine published by University of Oslo
- Apollon, Russian literary journal (1909–1917)

Given name

- Apollon Maykov (1821–1898), Russian poet
- Apollon Hussakovskyi (1841–1875), Ukrainian composer
- Apollon Systsov (1929–2005), Soviet engineer and statesman

Surname

- Dave Apollon (1898–1972), Russian mandolin player
- Tony Apollon, Mauritian politician

== See also ==
- Apollo (disambiguation)
