= List of ships named Apollo =

A number of ships have been named Apollo or Apollon, after the Greek and Roman god, including:-

== Merchant ships ==
- Apollo (1812), an East India Company ship
- Apollo (1831?), a trading ship that became a storeship in San Francisco, California
- Apollo (1832), a British paddle passenger ship, scrapped in 1885
- Apollo (1862), a British paddle passenger-cargo ship, scrapped in 1885
- Apollo (1865), a British screw passenger-cargo ship, sunk in collision on 7 March 1882
- Apollo (1866), a British-built Austrian passenger-cargo ship, scrapped in 1908
- Apollo (1927), a German cargo ship seized as a prize in 1945 and renamed Empire Taff
- Apollo (1936), the former British ferry and wartime landing ship Royal Scotsman, repurposed in the 1960s as founding flagship of the Sea Org of the Church of Scientology
- Apollo (1943), a Swedish cargo ship built as Empire Unicorn
- Apollo (1944 tug), a Greek tug, built as Empire Polly
- Apollo (1944 freighter), a Norwegian cargo ship, formerly naval auxiliary USS Rockdale
- Apollo (1945), an American cargo ship, built as the Liberty ship Willard R. Johnson
- Apollon 11 (1952), a Greek ferry from 1969, built by Harland & Wolff, Belfast as Irish Coast; sold to the Philippines in 1981
- Apollon (1960), a Greek cruise ship, built as Empress of Canada
- Apollo (1969), a vehicle and passenger ferry which operated in Sweden 1970–1976, Finland 1995–2000 and Canada (2000–2021)
- Apollon (1973), a Japanese-built cruise ship of Epirotiki Line 1992–1995, broken up in 2014

== Naval ships ==
=== Royal Navy ===
- HMS Apollo (1747) was 20-gun storeship captured from the French in 1747 and wrecked in 1749 off Madras.
- HMS Apollo was a 32-gun fifth-rate launched in 1763 as HMS Glory. She was renamed in 1774, and was broken up in 1786.
- HMS Apollo (1794) was a 38-gun fifth-rate launched in 1794 and wrecked in 1799 off Holland.
- HMS Apollo (1799) was a 36-gun fifth-rate launched in 1799 and wrecked in 1804 off Portugal.
- HMS Apollo (1805) was a 38-gun fifth-rate launched in 1805. She was put in harbour service, followed by use as a troopship in 1846 and was broken up in 1856.
- HMS Apollo (1891) was an Apollo-class protected cruiser launched in 1891. She was converted into a minelayer in 1909 and was broken up in 1920.
- HMS Apollo was a Leander-class light cruiser launched in 1934. She was transferred to the Royal Australian Navy in 1938, and renamed HMAS Hobart.
- HMS Apollo (M01) was an Abdiel-class minelayer launched in 1943 and broken up in 1962.
- HMS Apollo (F70) was a Leander-class frigate launched in 1970. She was sold to the Pakistan Navy in 1988 and renamed Zulfiquar.

==== See also ====
- Apollo-class cruiser of the Royal Navy
- Apollo-class frigate, Royal Navy sailing frigates

=== United States Navy ===
- USS Apollo (AS-25), a 1943 United States Navy submarine tender
