= Apollo 11 (disambiguation) =

Apollo 11 was the first mission that sent people to the surface of the Moon.

Apollo 11 may also refer to:

- Apollo 11 (1996 film), a telefilm
- Apollo 11 (2019 film), a documentary film
- Apollo Eleven (horse), a racehorse
- Apollo 11 Cave, an archeological site in southern Namibia
- "Apollo XI", a song by Orchestral Manoeuvres in the Dark from Sugar Tax

== See also ==
- Apollo (disambiguation)
- Apollo II
