= Basilica of St. Francis of Assisi, Kraków =

Roman Catholic church in Kraków, Poland

Coordinates: 50°3′33.2″N 19°56′10″E

Church of St. Francis of Assisi Friary of the Conventual Friars Minor
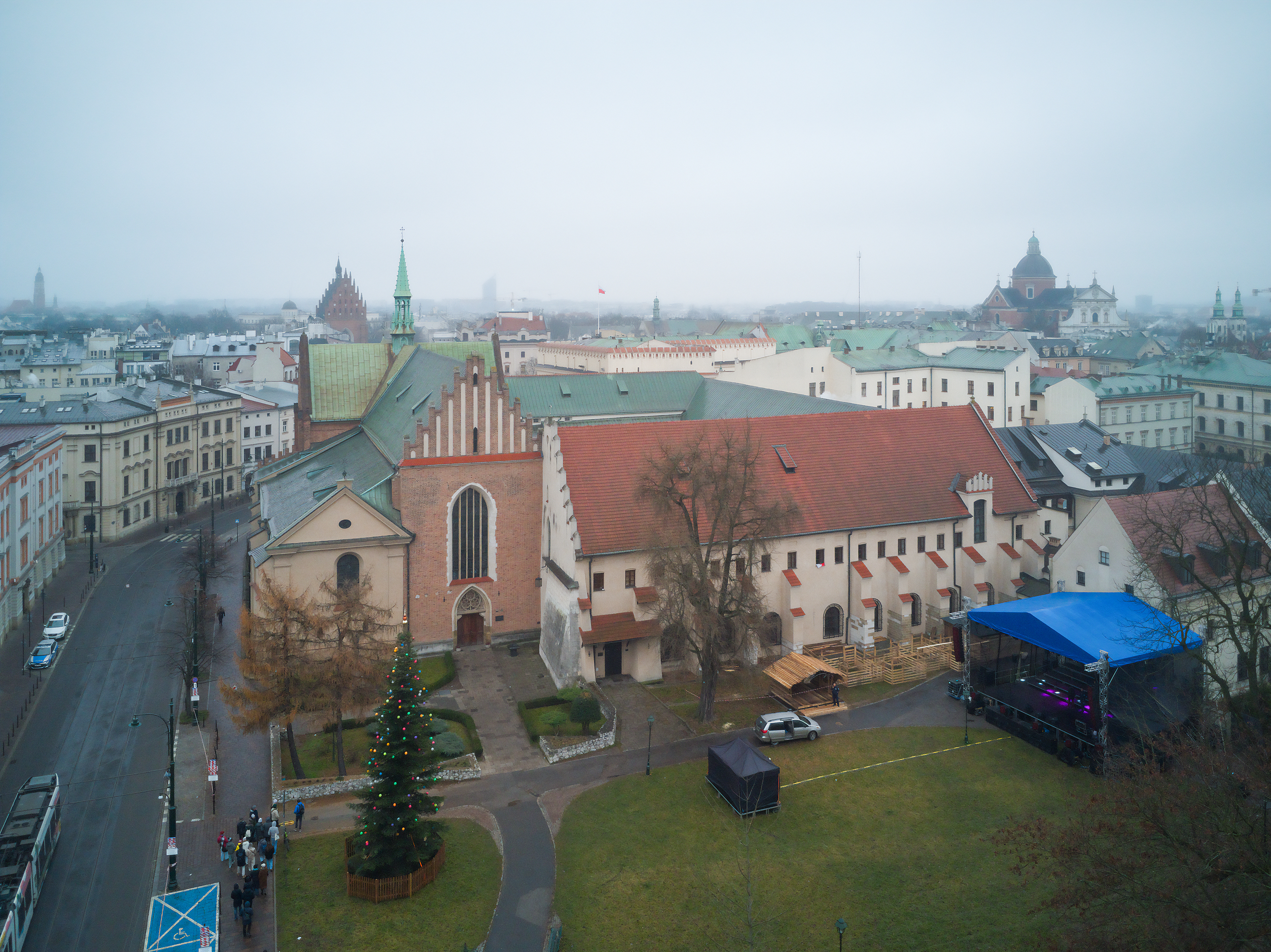
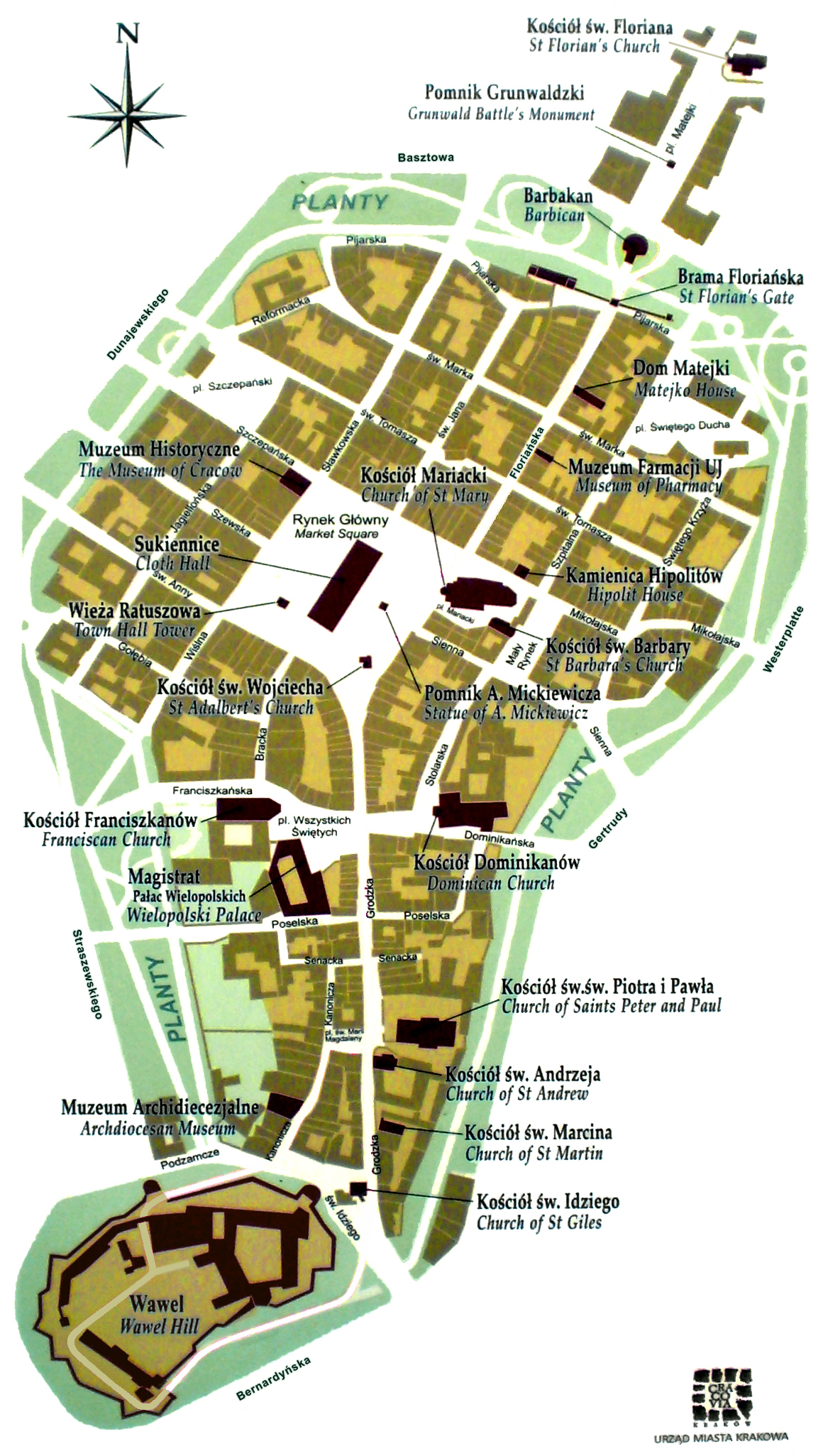
- View of the basilica from Planty Park Church location in Kraków Old Town (centre-left)
- Church of St. Francis of Assisi; Friary of the Conventual Friars Minor
- Location: 2 Franciszkańska Street; Kraków
- Country: Poland

UNESCO World Heritage Site
- Type: Cultural
- Criteria: iv
- Designated: 1978
- Part of: Historic Centre of Kraków
- Reference no.: 29
- Region: Europe and North America

Historic Monument of Poland
- Designated: 1994-09-08
- Part of: Kraków historical city complex
- Reference no.: M.P. 1994 nr 50 poz. 418

The Church of St. Francis of Assisi (Polish: Kościół św. Franciszka z Asyżu) and Friary of the Conventual Friars Minor located in the Old Town district of Kraków, Poland, are a Roman Catholic religious complex on the west side of All Saints Square at Franciszkańska 2, across the street from the Bishop's Palace in Krakow – which served as the residence of Pope John Paul II during his stays in the city. The Church dates back to the 13th century. The saint Maximilian Kolbe was a friar there in 1919, and led his first service at this church upon Poland's return to sovereignty.

== History ==
There is no consensus among historians about the church's founder. He was probably Duke Henry II the Pious (1196–1241), son of Prince Henry the Bearded (1165–1238) who resided in Kraków and also previously invited the Franciscans to Wrocław. His wife, Anna (daughter of the Bohemian King Premysl Otakar I), and especially her sister Agnes (Agnieszka) contributed as well. However, widely regarded as the founder is also Duke Bolesław V the Chaste with his wife St. Kinga, especially in the construction and reconstruction of the church and monastery after the devastation of the first Mongol invasion of Poland in 1241.

The Church was one of the first tall brick-and-sandstone buildings in the city. The original 13th-century Gothic structure was consecrated before 1269, and expanded in 1260–70. Not much remains from that particular period other than the ribbed 13th-century vault. Presbytery was elongated beginning in 1401 with the three-sided apsis (pictured). The cross-shaped central part with nave arcades was added around 1420–36 (the original chancel was straight). The annexes gave the temple a shape of a Greek cross for the first time. The expansion was re-consecrated by Cardinal Zbigniew Oleśnicki in 1436. In spite of various calamities (1462, 1476, 1655), the Church of St. Francis of Assisi and the adjacent Monastery experienced the most destructive fire only in 1850. The written records of its consecration along with priceless artifacts were lost.

For the Franciscan Order in Poland the period of foreign partitions was deadly. By 1864, from over 90 Franciscan monasteries only 8 remained in the country including the one in Kraków. The situation slightly improved after the Austro-Prussian War. In 1866, Austria granted a degree of autonomy to Kraków after its own massive defeat. In 1895, the eastern part of the church received murals with floral motifs by the founder of Young Poland, Stanisław Wyspiański. Wyspiański was also the author of magnificent stained glass windows in the apse, manufactured at the Innsbruck foundry in 1899–1904. The re-consecration of the renovated church by Bishop of Kraków, Anatol Nowak, took place on 14 June 1908. It was promoted to the rank of Basilica Minor on 23 February 1920.

== Shroud of Turin exact replica ==
The Franciscan Basilica is in possession of the certified copy of the Shroud of Turin, located in the Chapel of the Passion. It is placed at the main altar of the chapel (pictured) for all guest and parishioners to examine. The replica was consecrated by Pope John Paul II at the Vatican on 19 March 2003; and the ceremonial unveiling by Cardinal Franciszek Macharski of Kraków took place on 14 April 2003.The Shroud of Turin is a burial linen 4.36 by 1.10 metres (14.3 by 3.6 ft) large, with the reverse image of a man, believed to be the deceased Christ, who, according to tradition, was wrapped in it and placed in the tomb. In the middle is the apparent imprint of the face of Christ.

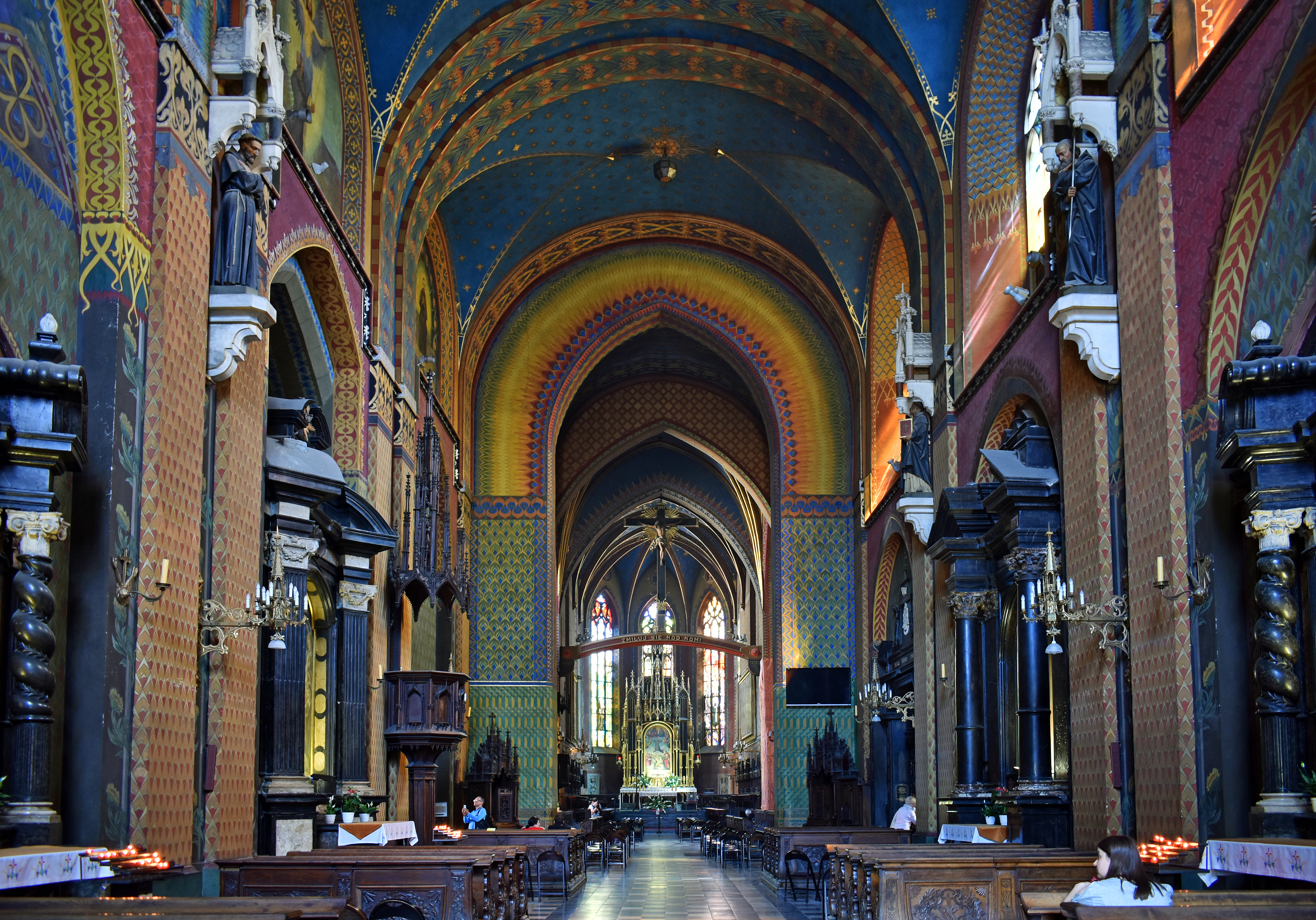
Main nave

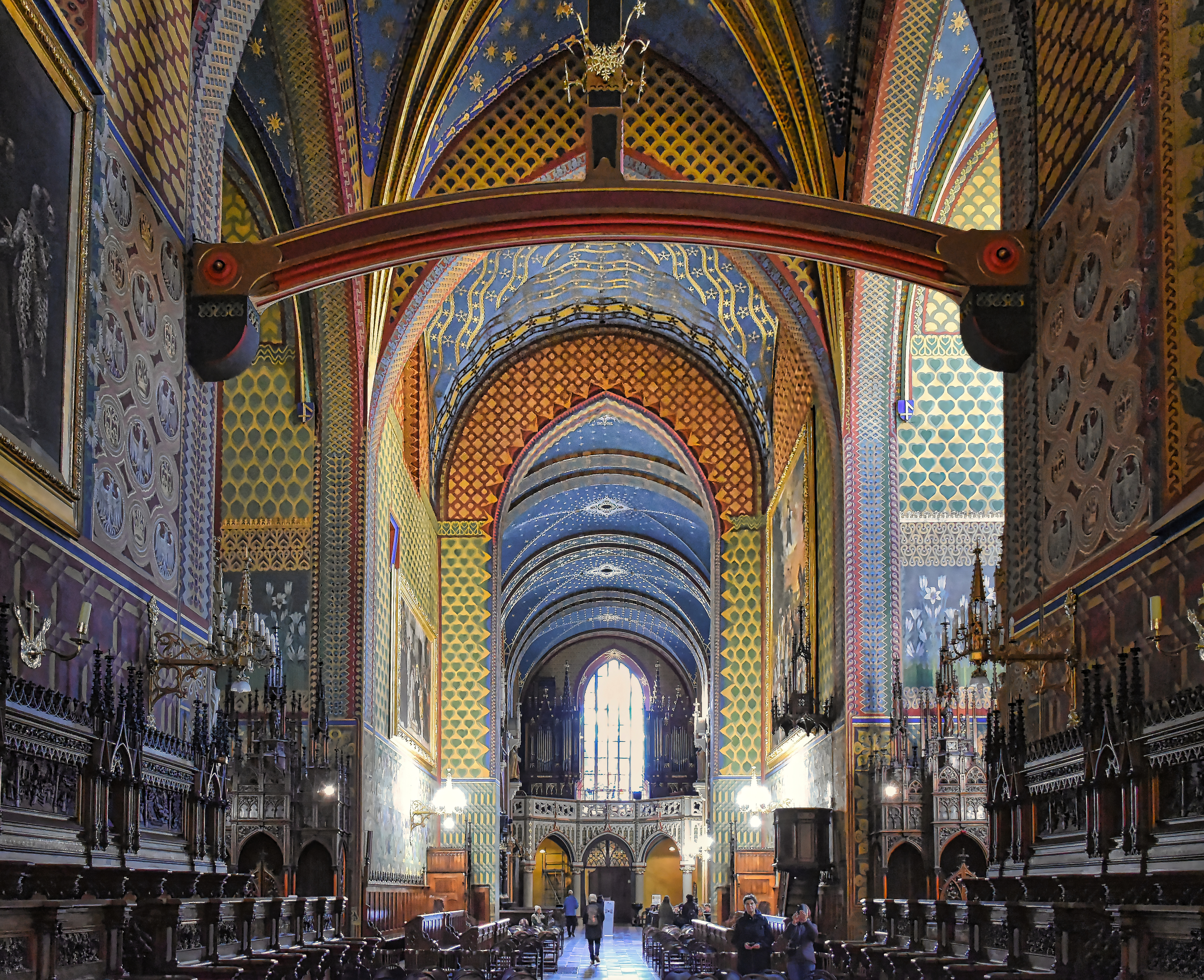
Main nave, view from the chancel

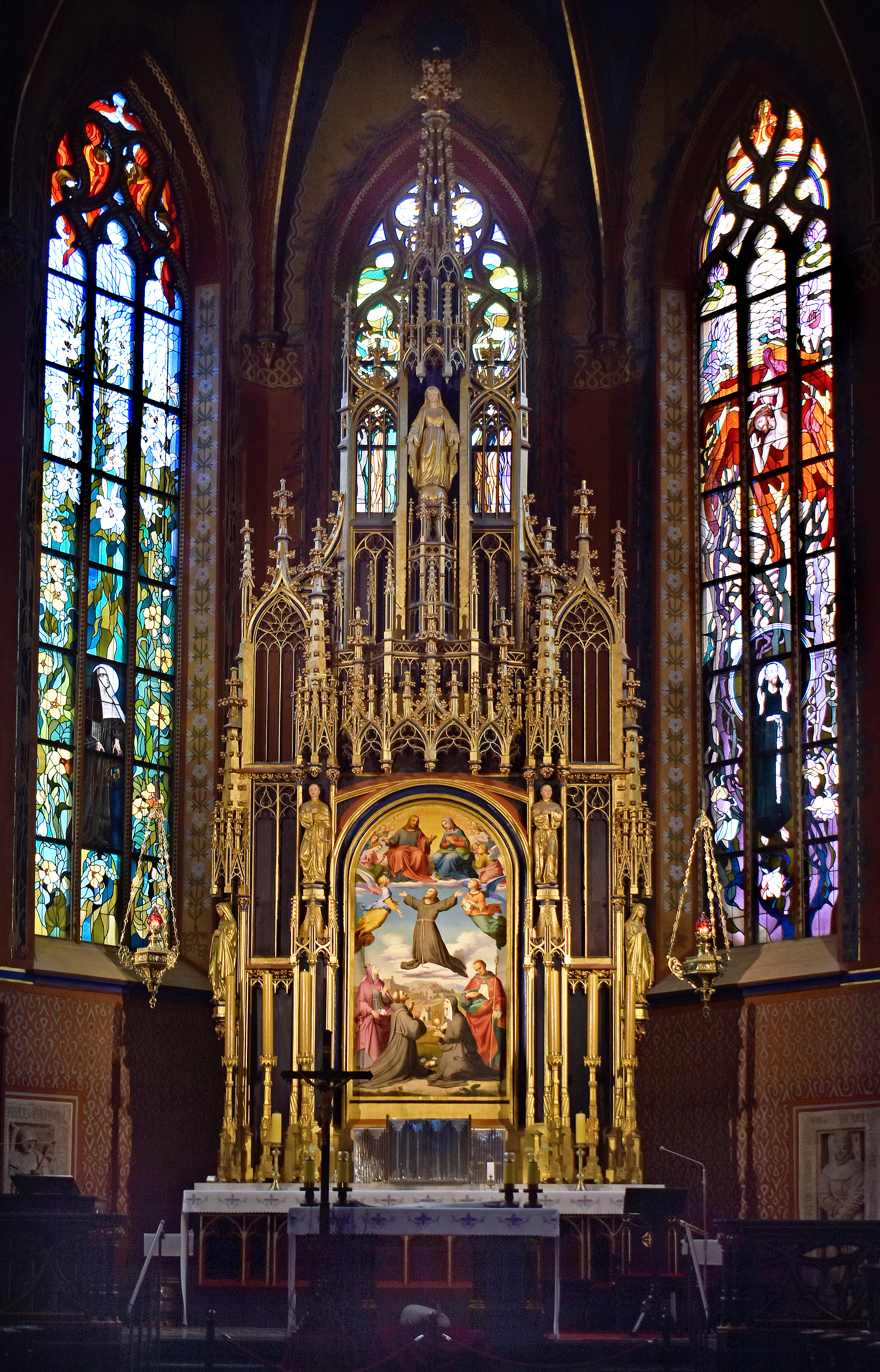
Apse with High-altar and stained glass by Wyspiański

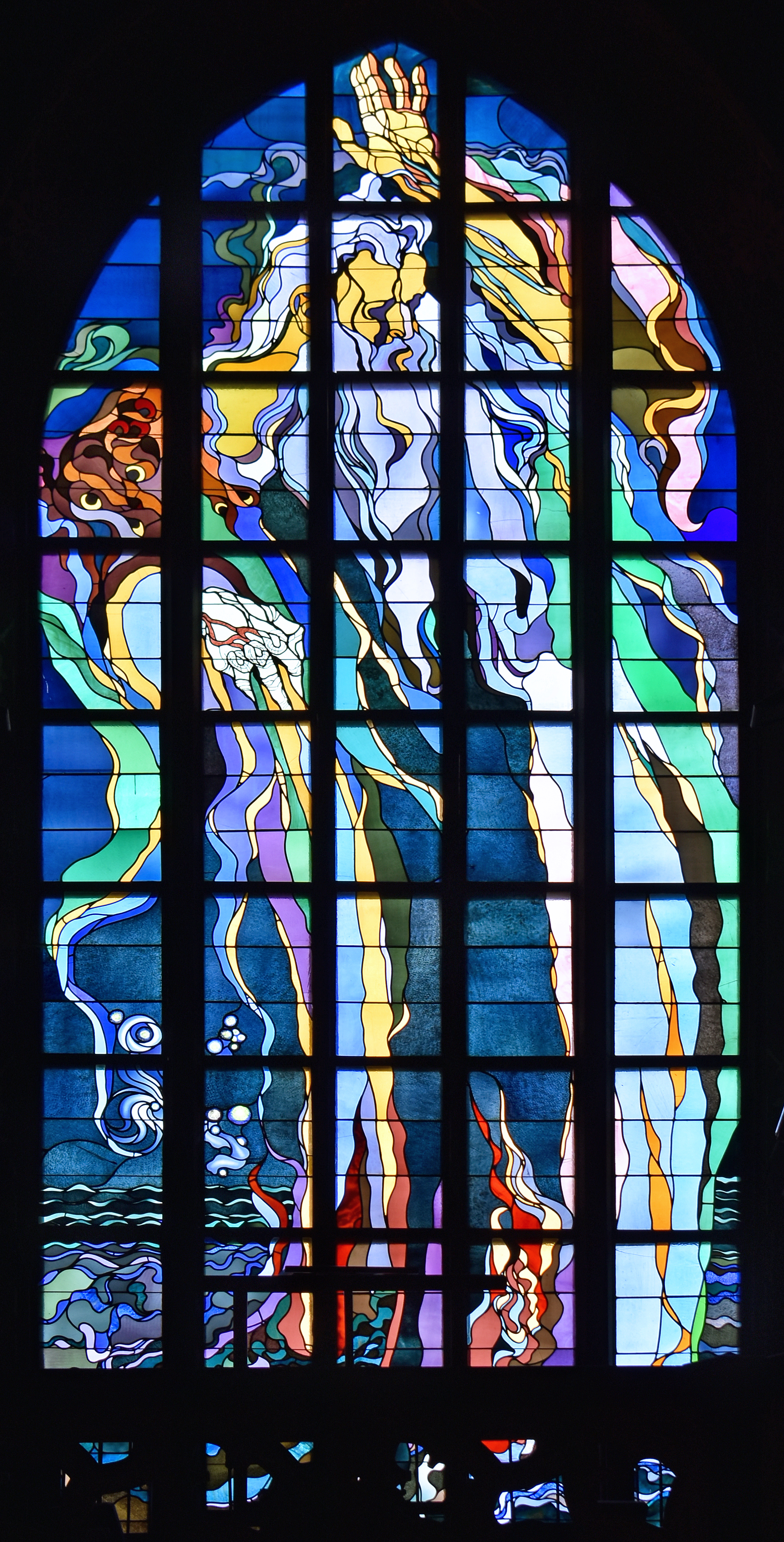
”God the Father” stained-glass window, designed by Wyspiański

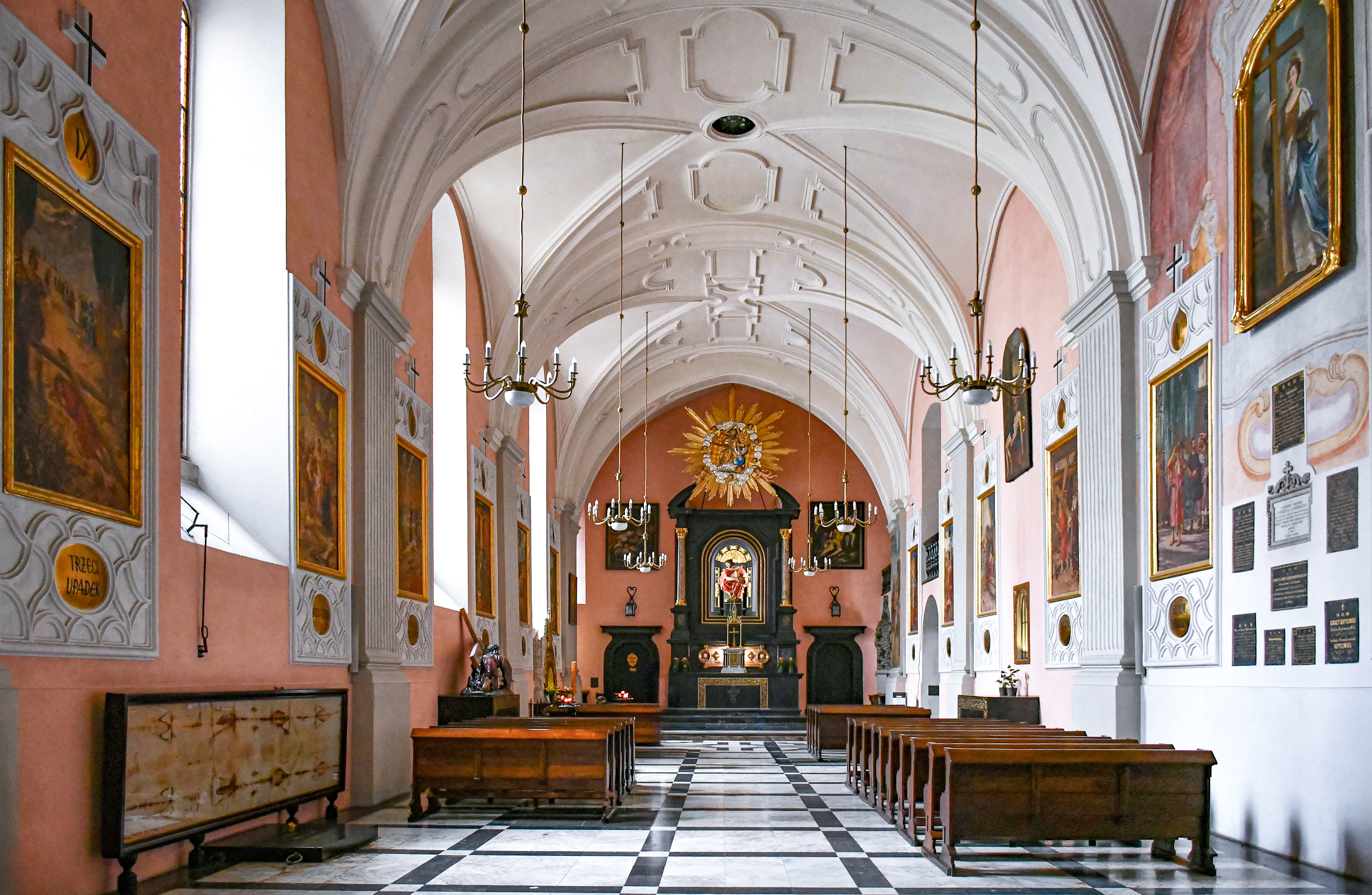
Passion of Christ Chapel and copy of the Shroud of Turin

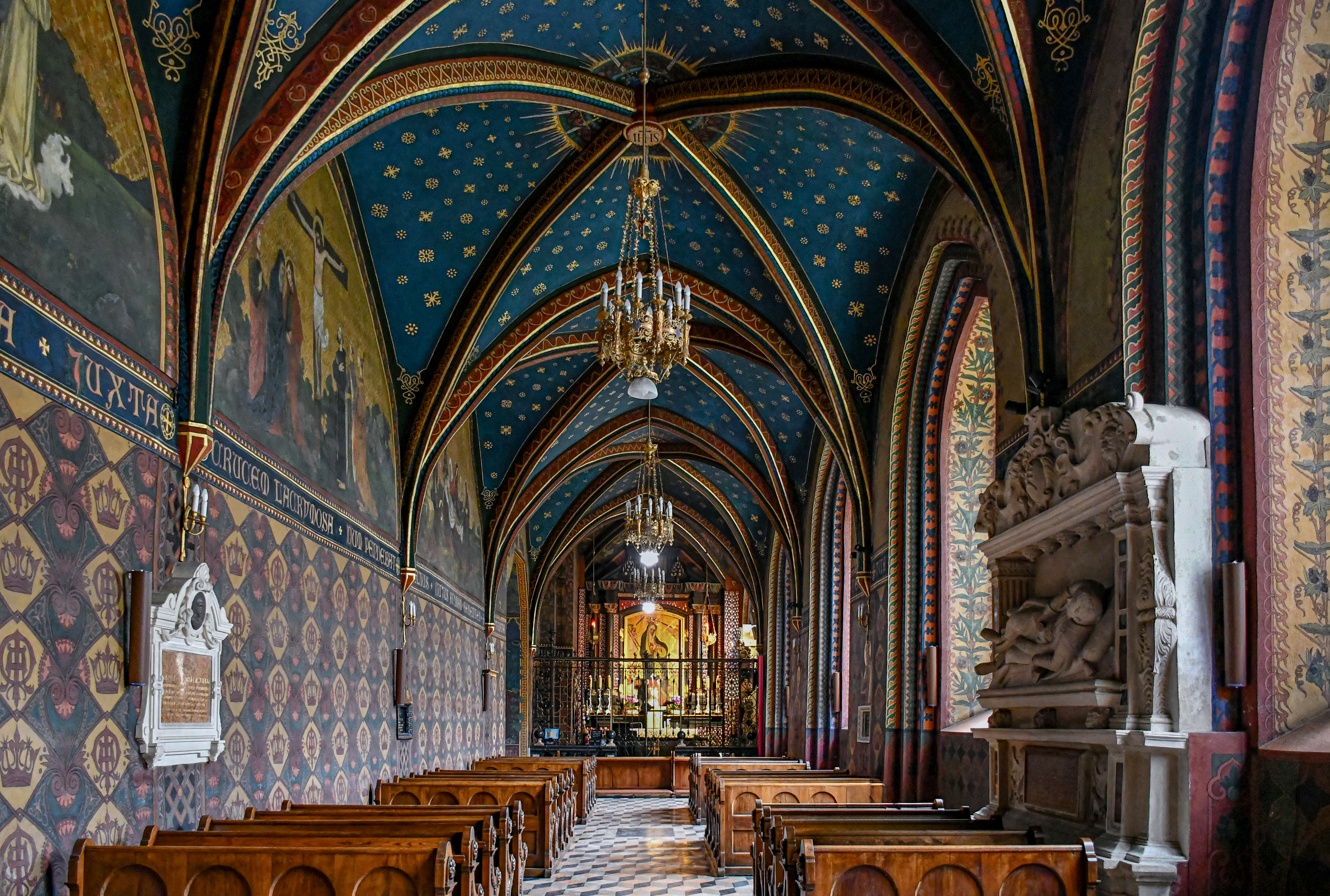
Our Lady of Sorrows Chapel

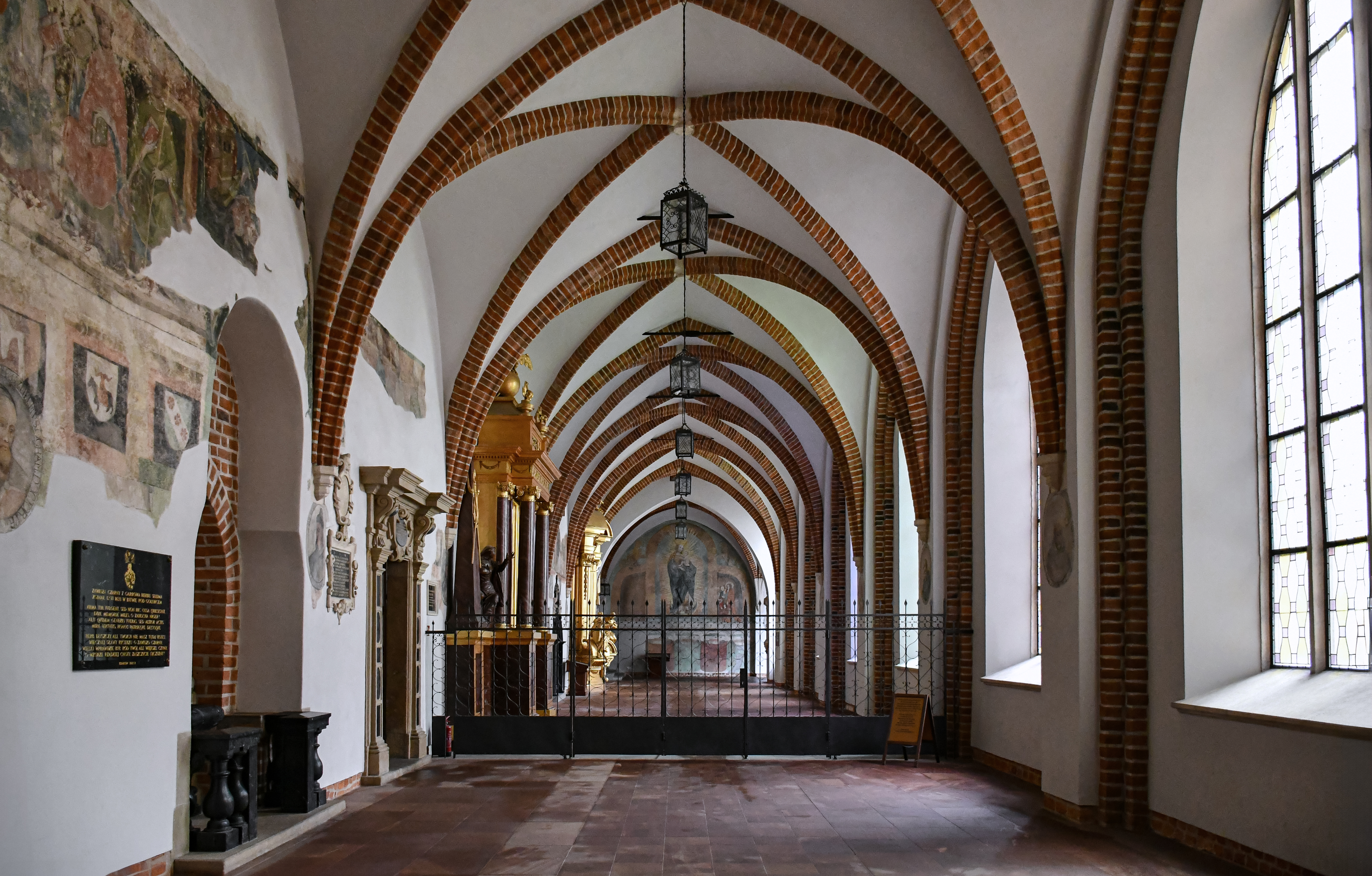
Franciscan Monastery, southern cloister

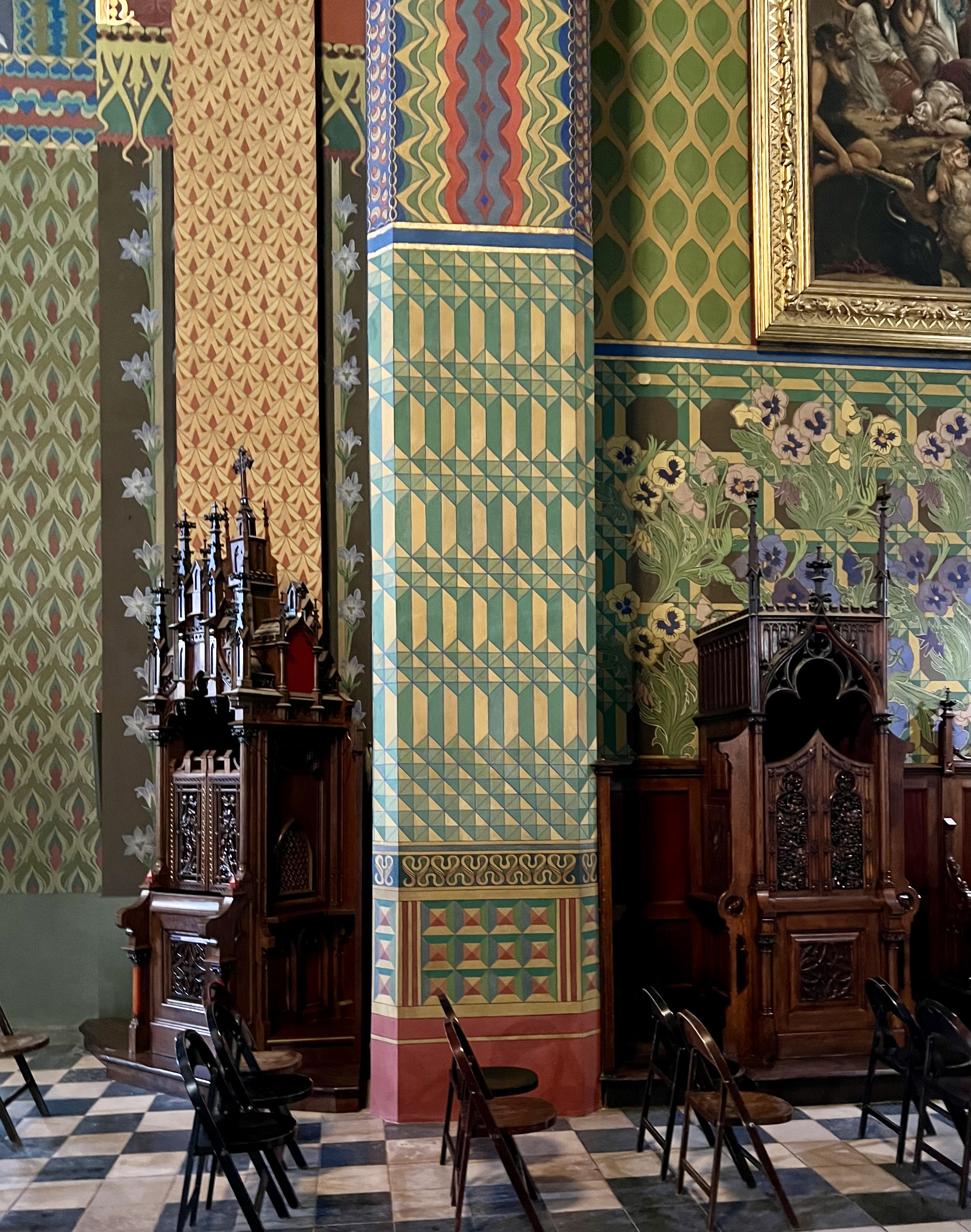
Floral motifs murals by Stanisław Wyspiański

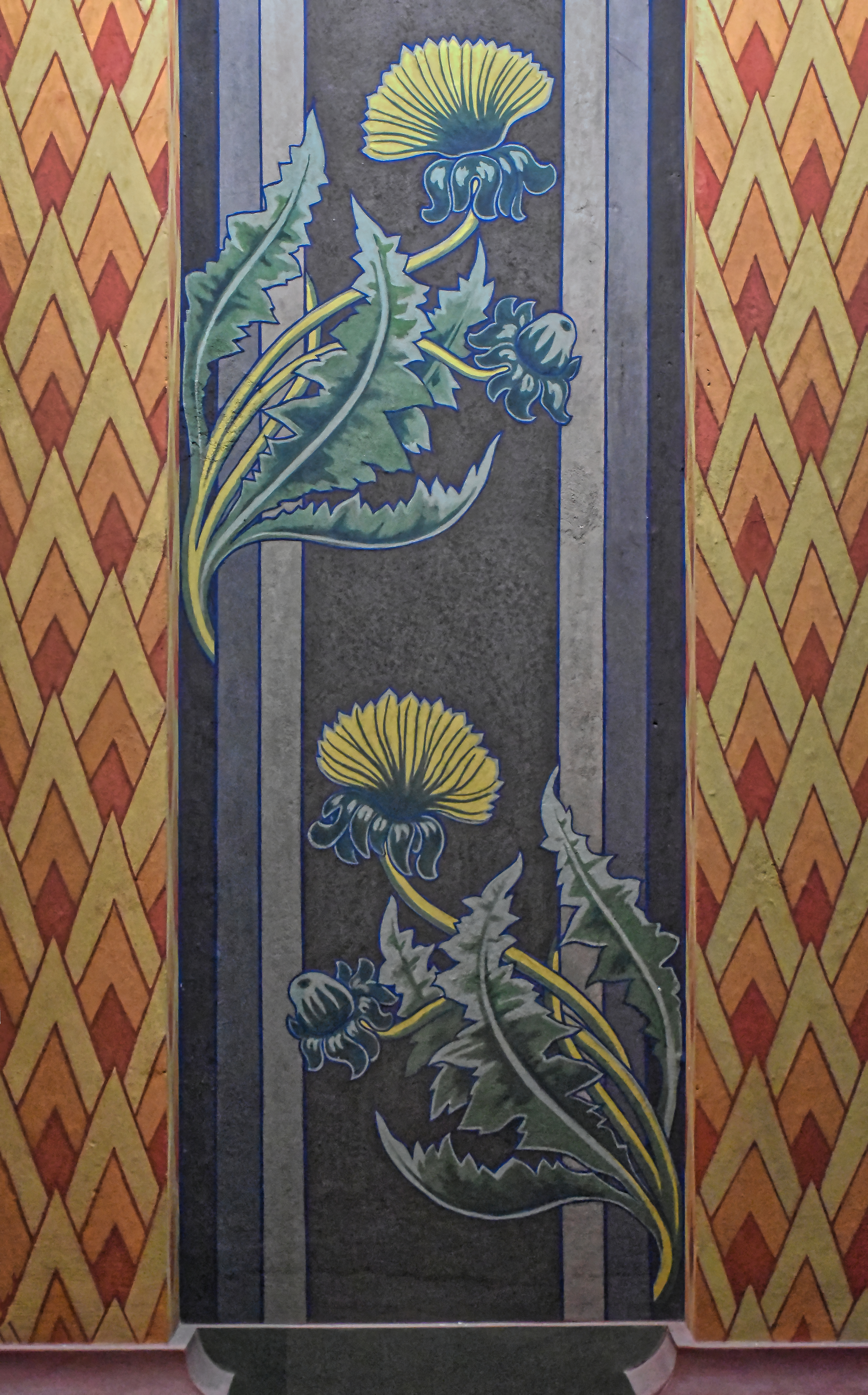
Detail of the polychrome designed by Stanisław Wyspiański

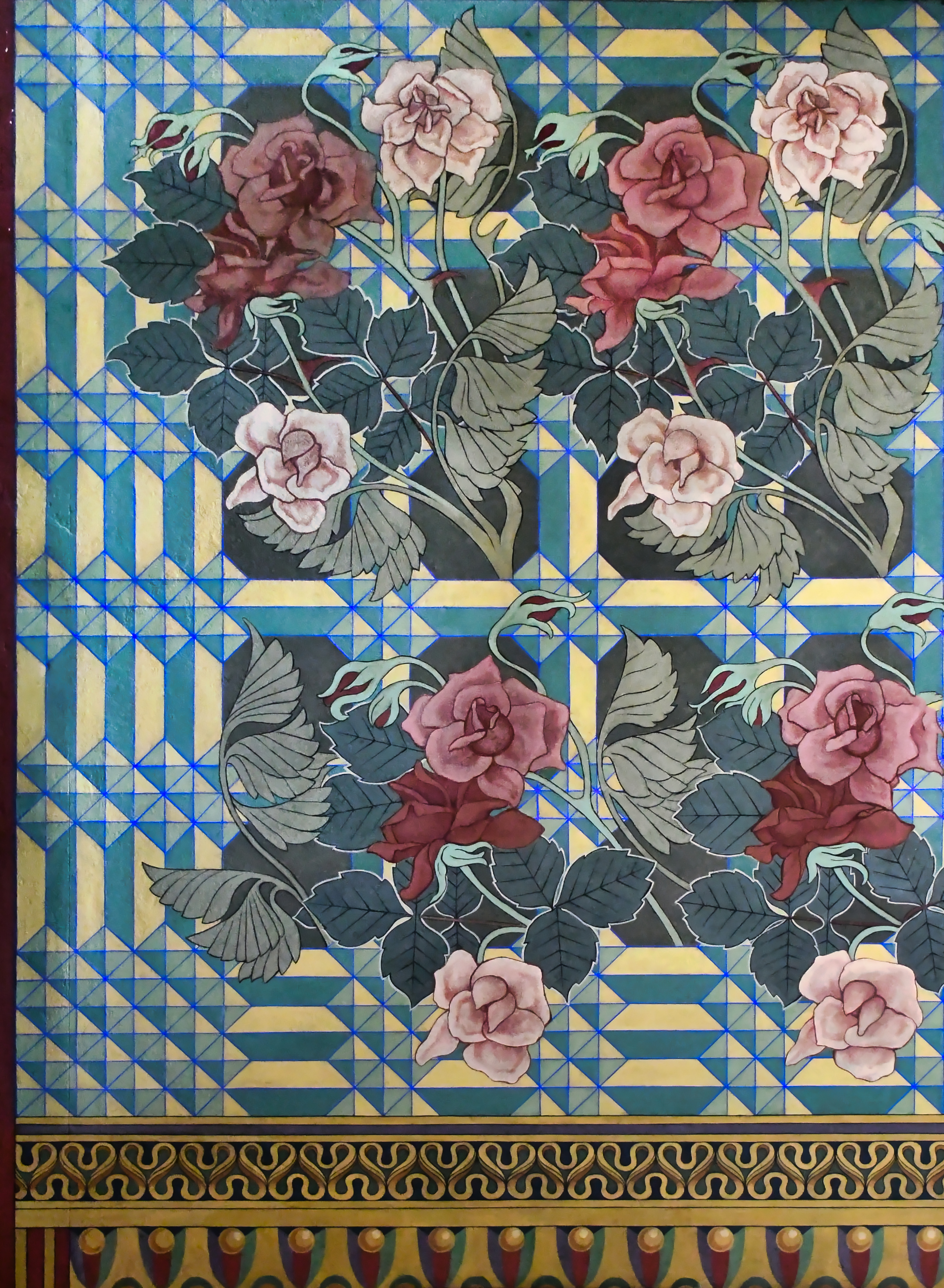
Detail of the polychrome (roses) designed by Stanisław Wyspiański

== See also ==
- God the Father (stained glass)
