= Appollo =

Appollo may refer to:

- Appollo Hospital, K.G.Koppal, Mysore, India
- Appollo Fibres Limited, merged to form Indian Petrochemicals Corporation Limited
- Appollo, codename for v4.0 of Railo, a web-scripting compiler
- Idea-Fly Appollo, a drone from Idea-Fly UAV
- Appollo Co., Ltd, a sanitary ware company in Guangzhou, China

== See also ==
- Apollo (disambiguation)
- Appolo (disambiguation)
- Apolo (disambiguation)
