= Apolo =

Apolo may refer to:

- Apolo, La Paz, a town in the La Paz Department in Bolivia
- Apolo Anton Ohno, a US-American Olympic gold medal-winning short track speed skater who also won Dancing with the Stars in 2007
- Apolo Kivebulaya, Ugandan Anglican priest and evangelist
- Germán Figueroa, also known as Apolo—a Puerto Rican professional wrestler

== See also ==
- Apollo (disambiguation)
- Appolo (disambiguation)
- Appollo (disambiguation)
