= God the Father - Arise =

Stained Glass Window in Kraków, Poland

Coordinates: 50.0591°N 19.9357°E

God the father - Arise
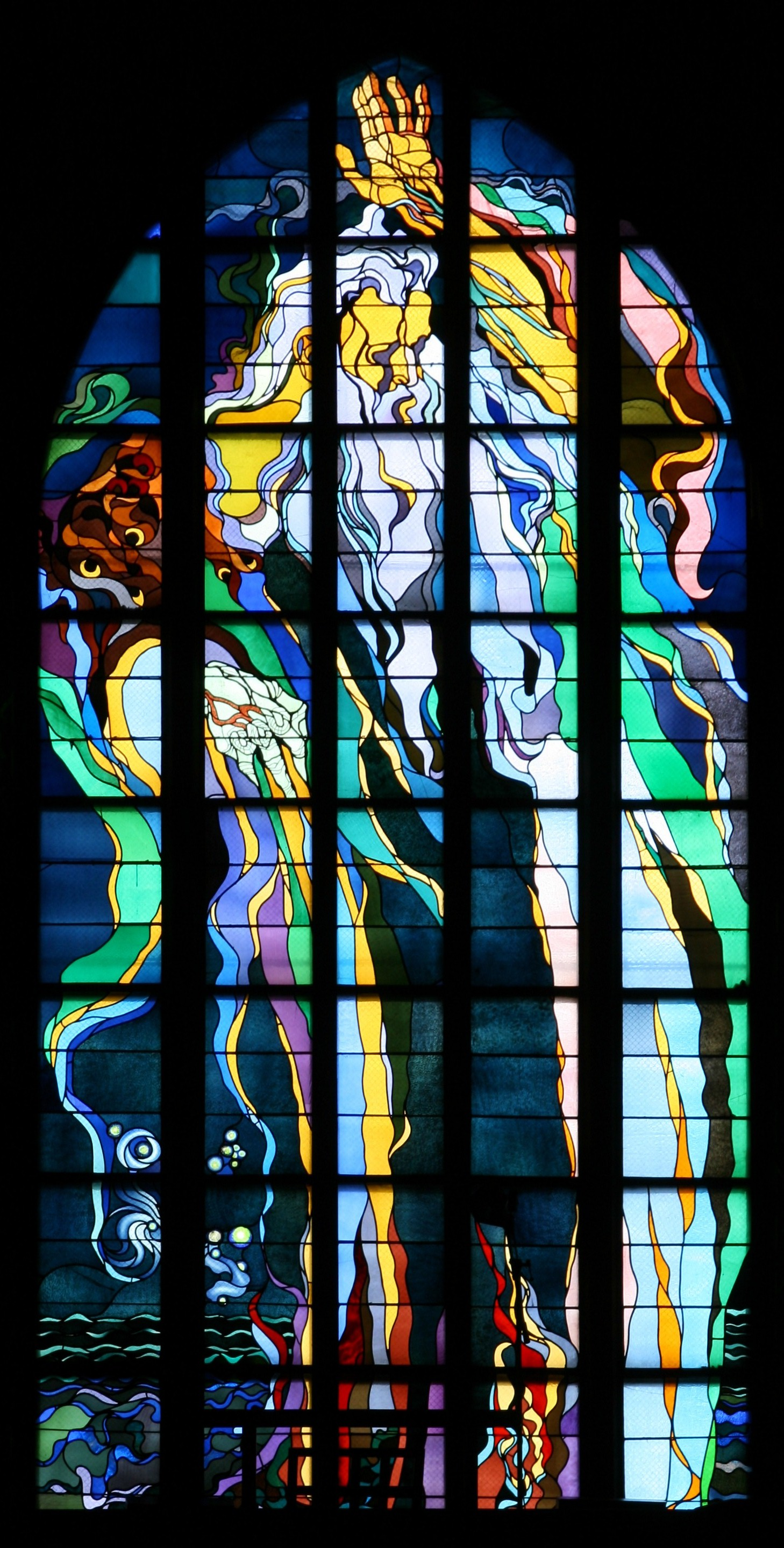
- Artist: Stanisław Wyspiański
- Year: 1904
- Type: stained glass
- Location: Church of St. Francis of Assisi; Kraków

God the Father - Arise is a stained glass window by Stanisław Wyspiański in the Church of St. Francis of Assisi in Kraków, Poland. From about 1904, the work has bright modern motifs, geometric and natural shapes, heraldic elements.

== History ==
Stanisław Wyspiański was versatile. In his literary works he left behind a lot of drawings, paintings and pastel pictures with views of Kraków, portraits, various illustrations and graphics. Wyspiański designed the stained glass windows and a series of murals for churches, and proposed the reconstruction of Wawel castle although the project was never implemented.

In collaboration with Józef Mehoffer, Wyspiański created 36 stained-glass windows for St. Mary's in Kraków, Jan Matejko when helping in the restoration of the building. The creative tandem proved successful, and among other distinguished participation in the competition decorative arts in Paris, and the development of the exterior curtain for the Juliusz Słowacki Theatre, in Kraków. On his own, Wyspiański designed for the Franciscan church, and created the stained glass artworks Rise, Blessed Salome, and Wounds of St. Francis.

== Description ==
God is depicted as an elderly man with a white beard, in a coat. He holds his left hand over his head, and the right points to the Earth. The artist described the creation of the world (Genesis 1:1, 1:16): "In the beginning God created the heaven and the earth ... And God made two great lights; the greater light to rule the day, and the lesser light to rule the night: he made the stars also."

The last of God's creations was man (Genesis 1:26): "And God said, Let us make man in our image, after our likeness: and let them have dominion over the fish of the sea, and over the fowl of the air, and over the cattle, and over all the earth, and over every creeping thing that creepeth upon the earth."

== See also ==
- Apollo (System Copernicus)

== Sources ==
- Stokowa М., Stanisław Wyspiański. Monografia bibliograficzna, (t. 1 — 3), Kr., (1967 — 68)
- Польський літературний вітраж / Переклади Анатолія Глущака. — Одеса: видавництво Маяк, 2007. — с. 21.
- С. Виспянська та художники його часу. Каталог виставки, М., 1958
- God the Father | Stanisław Wyspiański
