= Appolo (disambiguation) =

Appolo is a language spoken by the Nzema people of southwestern Ghana and southeast Ivory Coast.

Appolo may also refer to:

- Appolo F.C.; a soccer club in South Africa, see SAFA Second Division

== See also ==
- Appollo (disambiguation)
- Apollo (disambiguation)
- Apolo (disambiguation)
