= Apollo Theatre (Oberlin, Ohio) =

Coordinates: 41.291°N 82.217°W

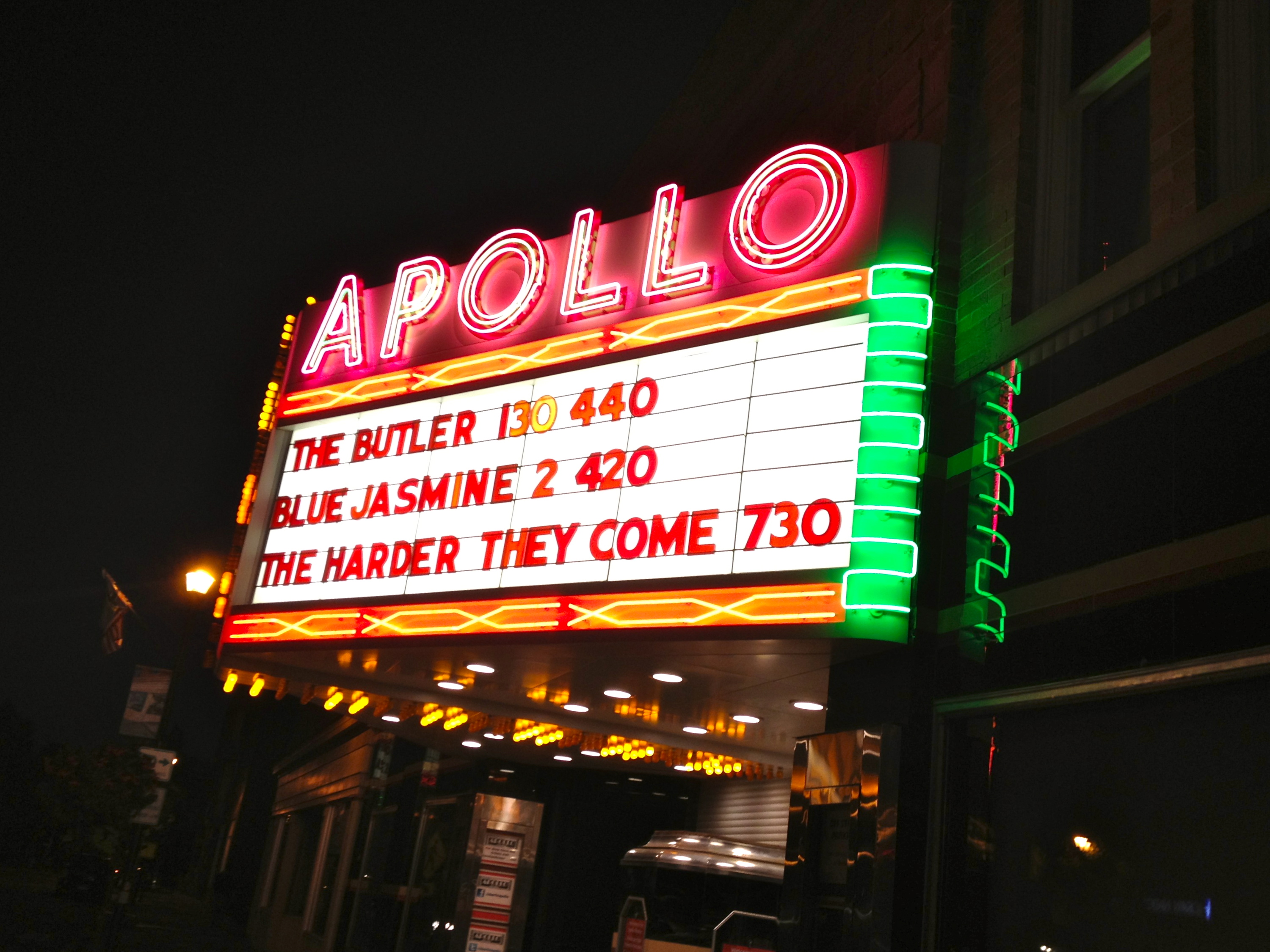
The Apollo Theater's iconic marquee at night.

The Apollo Theatre is a 1913 art-deco moviehouse located in Oberlin, Ohio and maintained by Oberlin College. It is notable as one of the earliest theaters to screen "talkies" and for its use as one of Northeast Ohio's film forums.

== History ==
While originally often used for vaudeville acts, The Apollo gained attention as an art cinema in the mid-1910s. The films that were shown were usually silent, the exception being when an organ would accompany the film. In 1928, the Apollo got its first “Talkie”, and from that point on, a new appreciation for cinema started to grow in the town of Oberlin. The theater changed hands many times in its early years before it came under the ownership of Jerome Steel who had previous involvement in the movie business. He had been a representative for Warner Brothers Pictures and Vitaphone, and also managed the Alhambra Theatre in Cleveland.

Steel closed the theater for a month to renovate. He added new lighting, an up-to-date organ, and a new screen. Once the theater reopened, he replaced some of the Vaudeville acts with the first “talkies”, and was eager to cater to both town and college interests. The Apollo was not the only theater in town, so to set it apart he created the motto, “Always a Good Show”, which was used in many of the Apollo’s advertisements. The motto proved effective as an advertising tool.

Besides running an effective business, Steel was well known for his generosity. When his twin boys Sandy and Bill were born, he gave a free show to the town. He also continued the tradition started by his predecessor, Oscar Smith, of a free Christmas show to Oberlin children who would bring a basket full of food for a needy family.

As the Apollo grew in popularity, both because of the effective business practices of Jerome Steel and because of his generosity, more renovations became necessary. New chairs, bathrooms, and a sound system were installed in September 1930 to meet the demands of the growing audience. The seat count would change twice again after that, once in 1931 and in 1936, jumping from 295 to 566, and finally to its peak at 900.

In the 1950s Jerome Steel needed more help and hired his son Bill as co-manager. With his help, a major renovation took place in 1953, reducing the size of the theater from 900 seats to a more manageable 840 seats and installing art-deco features that would remain for the next 55 years. Among those features would be the rich red-velvet walls of the auditorium, beige vinyl cushions in the lobby, plaster floral-patterned indirect lighting, modeled after the Hanna Playhouse Theatre in Cleveland, and the concession stand moved to the inside of the theater.

Jerome Steel died in 1959 and left Bill in charge of the theater. It was around this time that Bill began the last set of major renovations to happen until it was purchased by Oberlin College.

The renovation involved the installation of terreza black glass, put up around the exterior of the theater as well as in the lobby. The marquee changed shape from a rectangular marquee to a diamond shape marquee, which made it easier for pedestrians to see. The stage was shortened by about four feet, and instruments were carved into the front doors acknowledging the conservatory’s commitment to the arts. A local carpenter, Bill Jones, did the carvings.

Bill managed the theater for many years with the help of his wife, Arlene, and his brother, Sandy, but in 2008 the theater was put up for sale. Although many buyers stepped forward, the Steels made the choice to sell the theater to Oberlin College with the agreement that it would still be used as a movie theater for both college and town.

== Recent history ==
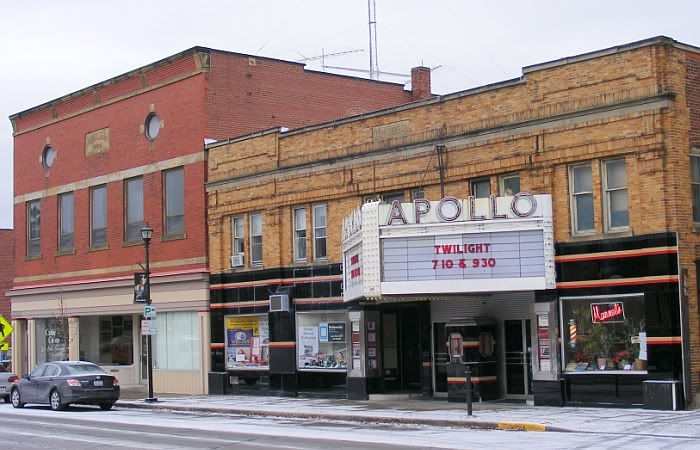
The Apollo Theatre undergoing renovation in 2008.

The Apollo Theatre was purchased by a wholly owned subsidiary of Oberlin College in February 2009. Two public meetings were held by the college to discuss future renovations and plans for the theater. Around the same time, a coalition of townspeople and college students formed Mission Apollo, a group that encouraged the college to maintain the single-screen theater and preserve the existing façade, marquee and interior.

The college hired Cleveland Cinemas to manage the theater shortly before the first set of renovations took place in the summer of 2009. The theater shut down in July and reopened in October 2009 with several new features but also the disappearance of some Apollo staples.

The theater has remained a mainstay in the Oberlin community at its comfortable locale in downtown Oberlin, and in 2012 became the centerpiece for The Danny DeVito and Rhea Perlman Cinema Studies Center for Media Education and Production. It includes editing labs, an animation area, a recording studio and small projection screening room.

== Proprietors ==
- 1914-1917, George Broadwell
- 1917-1925, Ira West
- 1925-1928, Oscar Smith
- 1928-1959, Jerry Steel
- 1959-2009, Bill & Sandy Steel
- 2009–present, Oberlin College
