= Apollo (System Copernicus) =

Stained glass window by Stanisław Wyspiański

Coordinates: 50°03′41.4″N 19°56′49.1″E

- Apollo (System Kopernika) (Polish)
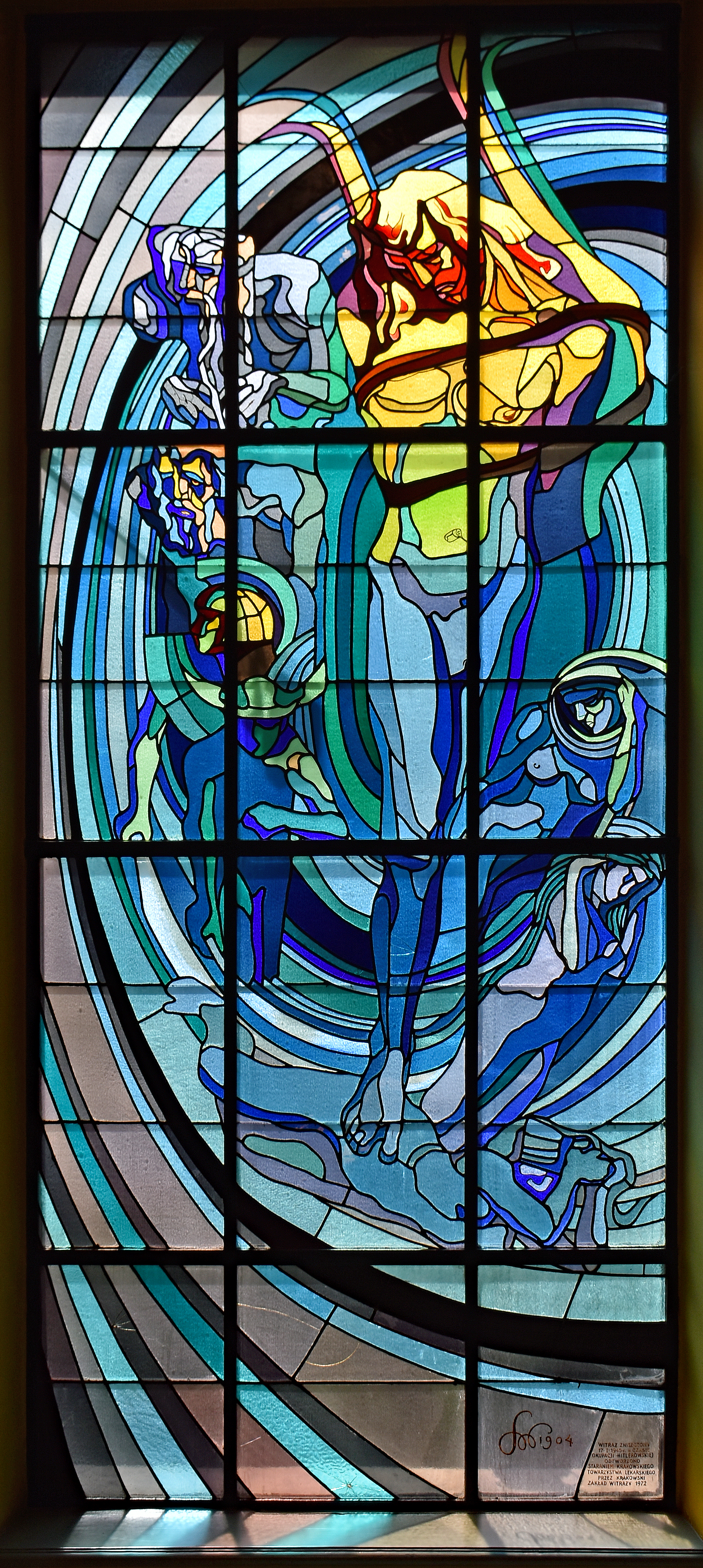
- Artist: Stanisław Wyspiański
- Year: 1903
- Type: stained glass
- Location: Kraków Medical Society House 4 Radziwiłłowska Street, Kraków

Apollo (System Copernicus) is a stained glass window, designed by Stanisław Wyspiański for the Medical Society in Kraków, from 1904.

== Location and history ==
The stained glass is located in the Medical Society house in Kraków, which was built for Dr. Julian Nowak in 1904. This is only one of the many art elements of the building designed by Wyspiański; he also designed stair railings, wall paintings and flooring, as well as furniture and chandeliers. The Wyspiański stained glass windows in the House of Medicine are the only stained glass windows by the artist housed in a secular building.

The stained glass is based on a pastel by Wyspiański with the same title; the pastel drawing is located in the collection of the National Museum in Kraków, which received it in 1946 as a gift from Dr. Nowak. This stained glass is one of the most reproduced works by Wyspiański, and has been printed in magazines, albums and postage stamps.

== Description ==
Apollo, god of the Sun, is represented tied up and attached to a lyre, which is crushing him with its weight. Such an approach to the subject has been interpreted among other things, as a reference to Nicolaus Copernicus stopping the Sun. Around Apollo, the painting shows other objects of the Solar System: Saturn, Jupiter, Mars, Mercury, Earth, Luna, and Venus.

== See also ==
- God the Father - Arise
