= Apollo Music Hall =

Music venue in London, UK, 1854 - 1871

Coordinates: 51°31′25.38″N 0°4′10.78″W

The Apollo Music Hall, also known as the Red Cross Public House, was a building at 25 Hare Street, Cambridge Heath, London. Built in 1854 at a cost of £3,000, it had a capacity of 600. It was licensed from 1854 until 1871. The music hall attracted young people that would "mimic popular comic songs, accompanied by a three-piece orchestra" during the week, and on Sundays the Salvation Army held church services that included gospel singing.
