= Apollo (1798 ship) =

History

Great Britain
- Name: Apollo
- Namesake: Apollo
- Builder: Bermuda
- Launched: 1798
- Captured: 1805

General characteristics
- Tons burthen: 136, or 137 (bm)
- Complement: 25
- Armament: 12 × 4&6-pounder guns.
- Notes: Built of Bermuda cedar

Apollo was built in Bermuda in 1798. From 1803 she made two voyages as a Liverpool-based slave ship in the triangular trade in enslaved people. The French captured her in port at Dominica in 1805.

1st voyage transporting enslaved people (1803–1804): Captain Cummins acquired a letter of marque on 9 August 1803. He sailed from Liverpool on 8 September 1803. In 1803, 99 vessels sailed from English ports bound for Africa to acquire and transport enslaved people; 83 of these vessels had sailed from Liverpool.

Apollo gathered her captives and delivered 169 captives to Dominica, on or just prior to 25 March 1804. (Note: One source reports that Apollo had arrived at Dominica on 31 March 1804. It also reports that she had taken 207 captives, of whom 169 arrived at Dominica.) While she was on her way an unknown vessel had approached at 9pm, and followed her throughout the night. Next morning at 8am the privateer, of 12 guns and 20–80 men, commenced an engagement. After about an hour the privateer sailed away. Apollo did not report having sustained casualties. She sailed for Liverpool on 30 April, and arrived there on 24 May. She had left Liverpool with 21 crew members and she suffered three crew deaths on her voyage.

2nd voyage transporting enslaved people (1804–1805): Captain John Cummins sailed from Liverpool on 31 July 1804. In 1804, 147 vessels sailed from English ports bound for Africa to acquire and transport enslaved people; 126 of these vessels had sailed from Liverpool.

Apollo gathered her captives at New Calabar. She delivered 169 captives to Dominica on 22 January 1805. (Note: Apollo had arrived on 22 January 1805. She had taken 209 captives and had delivered 169.) She had left Liverpool with 26 crew members and suffered three crew deaths on her voyage. Apollo sold her captives at Dominica.

== Fate ==
On 22 February 1805, the French raided Dominica. They left five days later, but not before capturing a dozen or so vessels in port, Apollo among them. The French took their prizes into Guadeloupe on 1 March.

In 1805, 30 British vessels in the triangular trade were lost; 11 were lost in the Middle Passage, between Africa and the West Indies. During the period 1793 to 1807, war, rather than maritime hazards or resistance by the captives, was the greatest cause of vessel losses among British slave ships.
