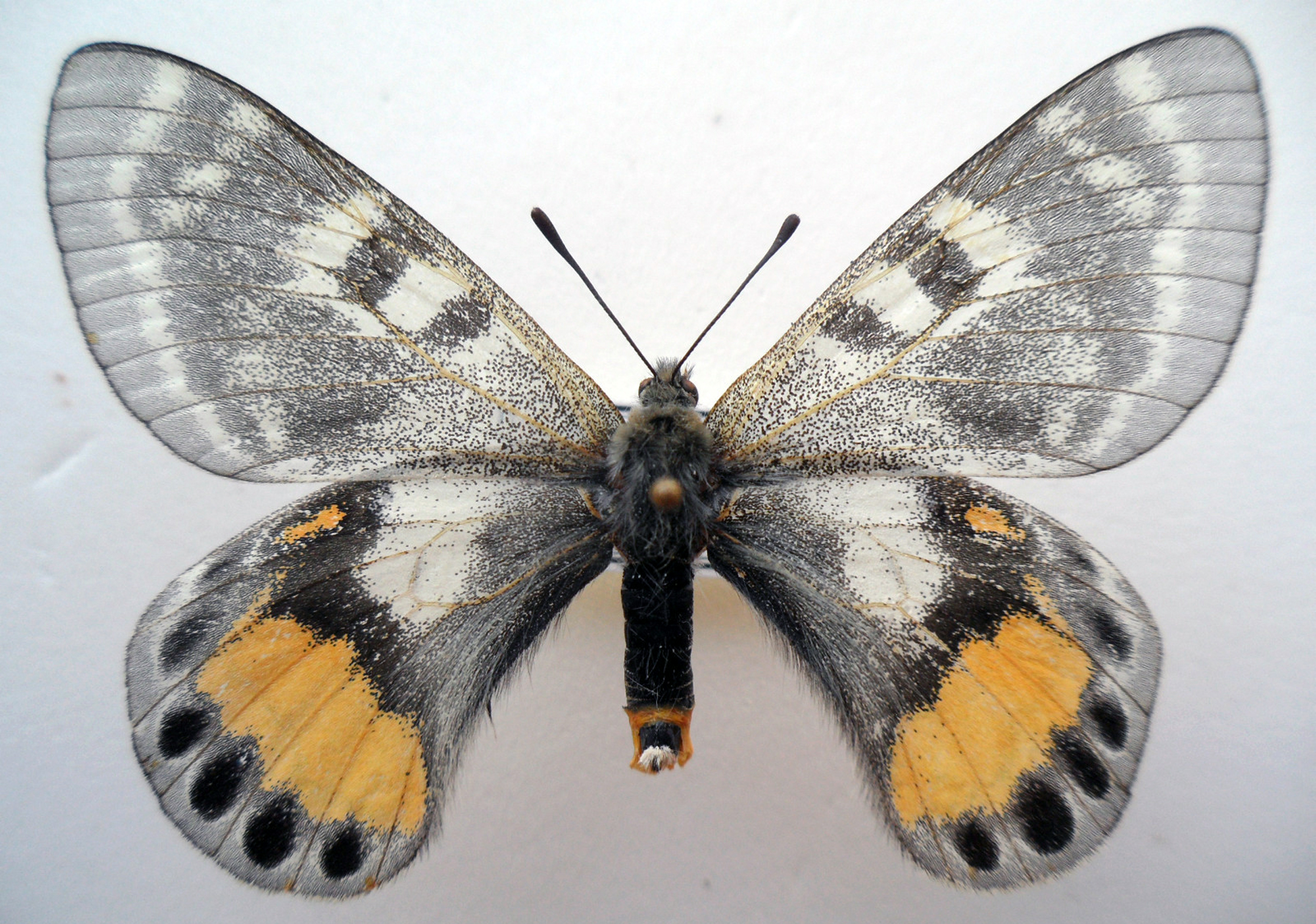

Conservation status
- Vulnerable (IUCN 3.1)

Scientific classification
- Kingdom: Animalia
- Phylum: Arthropoda
- Class: Insecta
- Order: Lepidoptera
- Family: Papilionidae
- Genus: Parnassius
- Species: P. autocrator

Binomial name
- Parnassius autocrator Avinoff, 1913

= Parnassius autocrator =

Species of butterfly

Parnassius autocrator is a species of butterfly in the family Papilionidae. It is found in Afghanistan and Tajikistan. Parnassius autocrator is a high-altitude butterfly (up to 3,000 m). The preferred larval food plant is Corydalis adiantifolia.

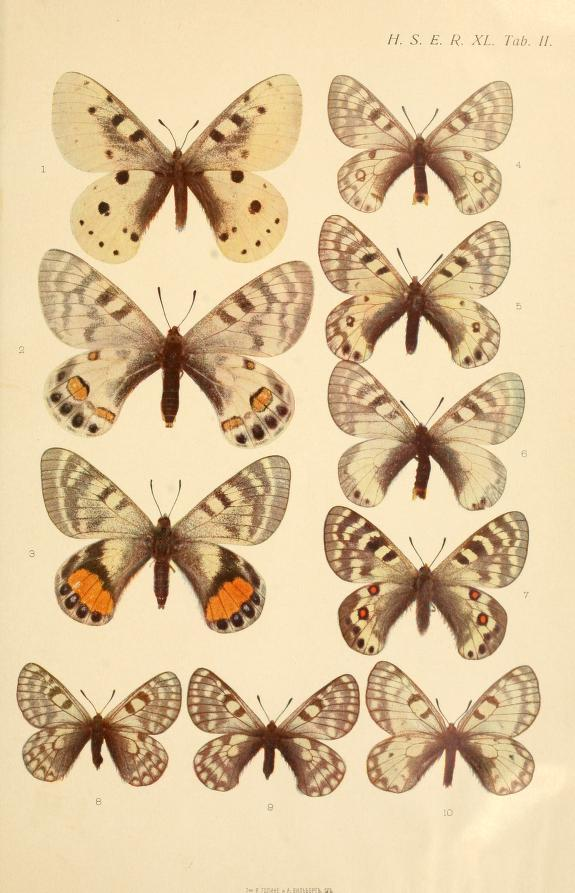
The plate accompanying Avinoff's description of P. autocrator
