= Acute haemorrhagic conjunctivitis in Ghana =

Aspect of public health in Ghana

Conjunctiva
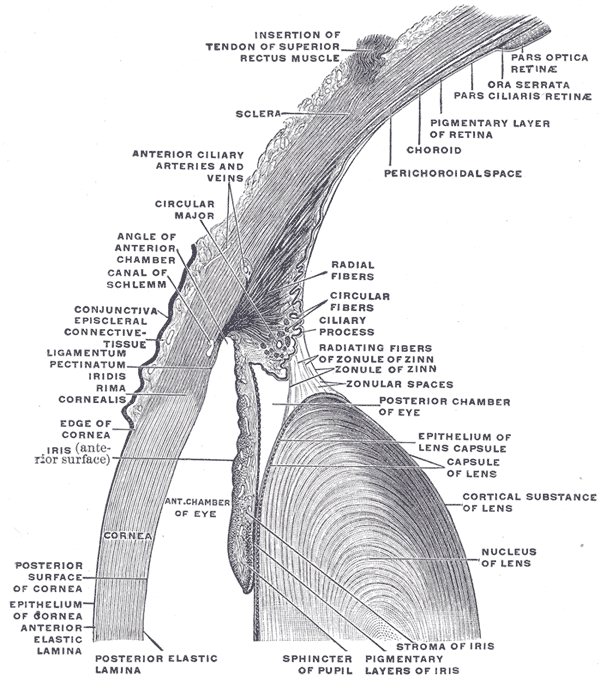
- The upper half of a sagittal section through the front of the eyeball. (Label for 'Conjunctiva' visible at center-left.)

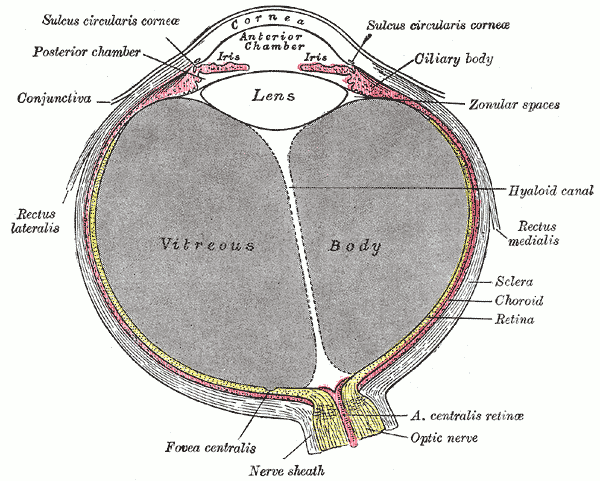
- Horizontal section of the eyeball. (Conjunctiva labeled at upper left.)

Details
- Artery: lacrimal artery, anterior ciliary arteries
- Nerve: supratrochlear nerve

Acute haemmorrhagic conjunctivitis is the inflammation of the conjunctiva of sudden onset. It presents as a reddening of the eye due to the infection of the conjunctiva. The conjunctiva is the thin transparent tissue that covers the eye from the corneal limbus to the lid margin. Many conditions can lead to the inflammation of the conjunctiva. They include allergies, bacterial infection, viral infection etc. A common form of the condition that occurs every rainy season is the seasonal conjunctivitis popularly referred to as "Apollo" by West Africans because the reports of its first epidemic in Accra coincided with the Apollo 11 Moon landing. Every year prior to the rainy season in the country, various health warnings are given to remind citizens of the condition.

== Signs of the disease ==
Acute haemmorrhagic conjunctivitis is normally recognized by the affected individual upon waking. The eyelids stick together requiring great effort in separating them. Intense whitish mucopurulent discharge is observed throughout the day with the eye having a reddish hue. There is pain which is worse upon looking up or at light. Other symptoms include sore eyes, feeling of grittiness or burning, redness, watery discharge, swelling of eyelids.

== Infection rate ==
AHC has a very fast rate of infection. Upon affecting one eye, the condition is known to infect the other eye in a short while (maximum three days). As an infected person goes around his house or work, the conditions spreads. This is because the things that the individual touches normally become sources of infection. As such it is advised that once infected, the individual should keep a high level of hygiene so that the rate of infection can be regulated.

== Effect on the visual system ==
Once the infection starts, affected individuals may experience several symptoms, including:

- Difficulty performing near work comfortably
- Blurry vision due to the discharge
- Sensitivity to light (photophobia)
- Eye discomfort due to a gritty or foreign body sensation

== Prognosis ==
The prognosis of the disease is generally favourable. Although it is self-limiting, recovery may be accelerated by the use of topical antibiotics.

== Public health issue ==
AHC occurs annually, affecting hundreds of thousands of people in Ghana every year. Due to the ease of transmission from person to person, it requires prompt treatment. This poses a significant health challenge to health workers, especially ophthalmologists and optometrists, as the large number of cases require varied treatment approaches. Infected individuals are advised to avoid crowded areas etc. to limit the person to person transmission. The temporary restriction of daily activities of the infected individual leads to decrease in productivity and visual function. The effect of this has implications on the infected individuals and those around them. For this reason, the Ministry of Health of Ghana considers the education and prompt treatment of those with the condition as vital tools for increased productivity across all fields of national development, especially prior to the rainy season.
