= Apollo, Georgia =

Coordinates: 33°21′55″N 83°31′40″W

Apollo is an extinct town in Putnam County, in the U.S. state of Georgia.

== History ==
The community was named after Apollo, the Greek and Roman god of music, healing, light, prophecy and enlightenment. The community still appeared on maps as late as 1955.
