= Apollo Records (1928) =

American record label

- Parent company: Pathe Records
- Country of origin: United States

Apollo Records was a Pathe Records subsidiary, based in the United States, briefly issuing records around 1928.

== See also ==
- List of record labels
- Apollo Records (disambiguation), distinguishing among similarly titled companies
