= Apollo-Theater (Siegen) =

Coordinates: 50°52′26″N 8°01′03″E

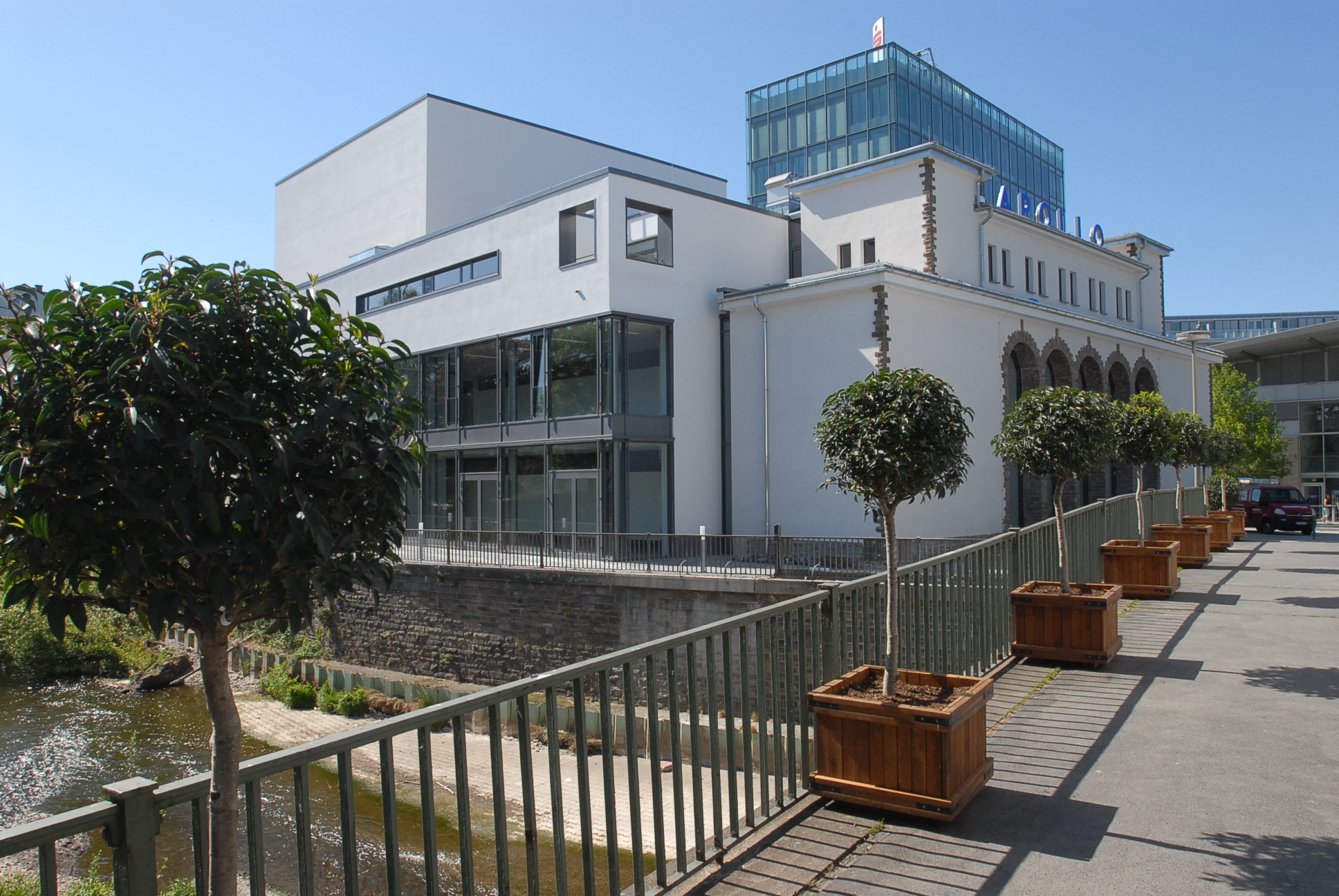
The Apollo-Theater

The Apollo-Theater is a theatre in Siegen, in the Arnsberg region of North Rhine-Westphalia, Germany.
