= Apollo (1906 automobile) =

Defunct American motor vehicle manufacturer

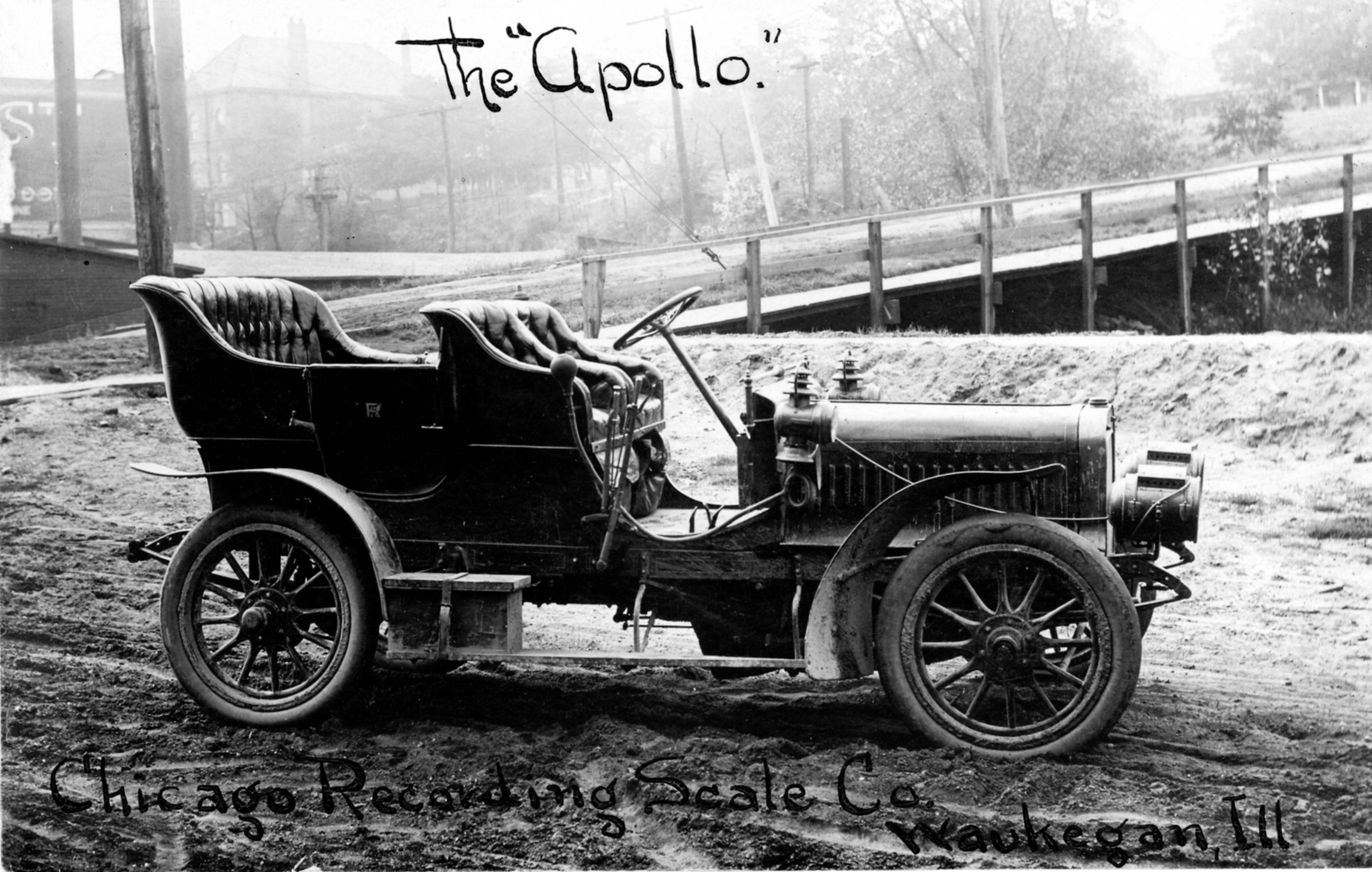
1906 Apollo Touring Car

The Apollo was made by the Chicago Recording Scale Company of Waukegan, Illinois, from 1906 to 1907. The only model, the model B, produced was a five-seater with a Roi-des-Belges body. The barely known predecessor in literature, Model A, had nearly the same technical specifications as Model B. Power came from a water-cooled four-cylinder engine by way of a three-speed transmission and shaft drive. The engine power was 35 hp. The four-cylinder engine had a displacement of 5213 cc with a bore of 114.3 mm and a stroke of 127 mm. The wheelbase was 2794 mm, the track width 1422 mm. The vehicle weight of the five-seater was 998 kg. The selling price was 2500 dollars.
