= Apollon (Norwegian magazine) =

Quarterly popular-science magazine in Oslo, Norway

- Categories: Popular science magazine
- Frequency: Quarterly
- Publisher: University of Oslo
- Founded: 1991
- Country: Norway
- Based in: Oslo
- Language: Norwegian
- Website: Apollon
- ISSN: 0806-3702
- OCLC: 189864465

Apollon is a quarterly research-oriented popular science magazine published by the University of Oslo. The title of the magazine is the Norwegian word for Apollo. The publication's full title is Apollon: forskningsmagasin fra Universitetet i Oslo (Norwegian: Apollo: Science and research magazine from the University of Oslo).

== History and profile ==
Launched in 1991, the magazine is a quarterly publication of the University of Oslo. It reports research findings of scholars working at the University, with a target audience including academics, students, politicians, and those interested in scientific research.
