= List of Axe products =

The following is a list of Axe (known as Lynx in some markets) products:

== Deodorants ==
Axe's list of yearly (or bi-yearly) body-spray variants is as follows. Limited edition, short-lived & Fine Fragrance/Premium Collection variants are listed in a following table below and others.

Year	Variant Name	Description	Notes	End date
1983	Amber, or Ambre, or Sandal, or Magic Amber or Wild Spice or Epicee.	Variant names are a description of the fragrance.	One of the first three variants that Axe launched, first in France. Discontinued	Unknown (test fragrant)
1983	Musk, or Brave, or Moschus, or Wild Musk.	Variant names are a description of the fragrance.	One of the first three variants that Axe launched, first in France. Available in Germany.	Present
1983	Spice or Agrest or Boise, or Blue Chypre or Fraiche.	Variant names are a description of the fragrance.	One of the first three variants that Axe launched, first in France.	Unknown (test fragrant)
1985	Amber, Musk (Moschus in Germany), Spice	Variant names are a description of the fragrance.	In this year, these three variants were used to launch the brand in the UK. Musk is still available in Argentina, Brazil, France, and Germany	Possibly late 90s
1987	Oriental or Orient or Dark Oriental	Variant name are a description of the fragrance.	This was the first "new" variant that Axe launched and started a strategy of a yearly (or bi-yearly new variants.). Discontinued	Possibly late 90s
1989	Marine	The name is a description of the fragrance.	As of 2013, still available in the Netherlands, Austria, France, Belgium, Spain, Argentina, Bolivia, Brazil, and CENTCOM AAFES stores that stock from Europe.	Possibly late 90s or early 2000s but still available in some countries.
1990	Java	a Variant named after the island in Indonesia.	Discontinued. A re-release retro limited edition was launched in 2021 in the UK.	Possibly 2002. (Re-release no longer available in UK)
1991	Alaska	Variant named after the state in the United States. Known as Tempest in South America.	Discontinued - still available however in Germany.	Possibly 2002
1992	Nevada	Variant named after the state in the United States.	Discontinued	Possibly 2002
1993	Tempest		Discontinued	Possibly late 90s
1994	Mirage		Discontinued	Possibly late 90s
1995	Africa or African Amber or Native	Variants named after the continent.	The most popular Axe variant, marketed as Kilo in North America and Native in Brazil. Got a 25th Anniversary pack in the UK & Ireland, in 2020. A G.O.A.T pack in 2023, in UK, Ireland & Australia. Recently, a limited edition FIFA World Cup pack was released in 2026, in UK & Ireland.	Present
1996	Inca or Aztec	A warm spicy fragrance named after the Inca civilization.	Discontinued	2002
1997	Atlantis or Energy		Still available in some countries	2004
1998	Apollo		Discontinued but relaunched in UK & other countries in 2013	2004; Present
1998	Eclypse	Variant released only in South America.	Discontinued	2004
1999	Voodoo		Limited edition variant released in the UK to cover the "Voodoo Eclipse" Dance Event marking the solar eclipse in 1999.	Discontinued (Australia as of 2024/2025)
1999	Hypnotic		Advertisements for the variant asked viewers if they believe in hypnosis, implying that to be its effect on women.	2008
2000	Phoenix		Limited edition variant released to cover the "Phoenix Legends" Dance Event in Ibiza, Spain in 2000.	Present
2000	Adrenalin or Accelerate or Orion	Not available as a shower gel.	Still available in some countries.	Present
2001	Gravity		The advertising featured a man falling to Earth.	Present
2002	Dimension	Also called Enygmata in some countries.		Present
2002	Apollo, Kilo, Phoenix, Tsunami or Maniac, Voodoo	Axe launched in U.S.	This is the line up that Axe launched within U.S.	n/a
2003	Pulse	A European variant suggests that it gives geeks added confidence so they can pull off crazy dance moves to impress girls and be irresistible.	Used the "Make Luv" dance track which reached number 1 in UK. Still available in India.	2008
2003	Essence or Fusion	A US variant	Used TV advertising that showed two sides to a man's relationship with women, also called Fusion in some countries.	Discontinued as of 2025, but still available in Canada.
2003	Conviction	Join the world of conviction. Join the world of conquest. Because if you have conviction, no woman can say no. No woman who can turn her face. Because women like men safe. Unite to this world.	Used TV advertising that showed many men who are successful with women. At the end of the advertising there are thousands of men holding Axe Conviction and singing in a choir by a statue of a man also holding Axe Conviction.	Present
2004	Denim		Released In India as shaving cream, deodorant and aftershave.	2008
2004	Touch	A red blood color.	The TV advert features women getting more and more turned on	2008
2005	Unlimited	A light blue color.	Advertising for the fragrance mimics the Chinese kung fu film Crouching Tiger, Hidden Dragon.	2007
2006	Click or Clix	Also called Score in some countries.	This variant is promoted as making men so attractive to women that they will need a clicker to keep score of the number of women who check them out. A commercial for Clix features Nick Lachey (Ben Affleck in the British version), where he is "out-scored" by a hotel worker wearing the product. Axe gave away free clickers to promote the variant.	Unknown
2006/2007	Vice	Advertising implies that it will turn "nice girls naughty" thanks to forbidden fruit in the fragrance. The Latin phrase virgo in flagrante delicto is printed in mirrored text on the spray, body wash, and deodorant stick.	Uses a Morgan Freeman lookalike in the advertising that mimics the style of a crime film. Limited edition repackaging was available in some parts of Latin America, mainly used as promotion for City Hunters.	2010
2007	Dark Temptation	A chocolate-smelling fragrance; advertising implies that because women like chocolate, they will find men who smell of chocolate irresistible.	Advertising features a man who turns into chocolate when he sprays himself with Axe. He then goes on to be eaten by a series of women. In some countries, it got a limited edition FIFA World Cup variant in 2026.	Present
2009	Instinct	The scent includes cardamom, amber, and atlas cedar to produce a spicy scent of leather.	The advertising campaign features a caveman who sprays the fragrance on himself and becomes irresistible to women. The tag line is "No one can resist a man in leather."	Discontinued
2009	Wild Spice	Spice fragrance.	Not available as a shower gel yet.	Present
2010	Twist (TWIƧT) or Shift	Has a citrus scent.	Spelled with a backwards S.	Discontinued,
2010	Music Star (Music in United States)	Has 'rock and roll' style fragrances.	Black, white and red can with guitar motif. Also the logo is changed for this fragrance only.	Discontinued
2010	Rise or Rise Up	Yellow can with blue splats and gray streaks.	Advertised as a scent to wake up the consumer and keep them alert.	Discontinued
2010	Cool Metal	Blue and silver metallic can.	Advertised as a product to cool the consumer down.	Discontinued
2011	Provoke or Excite or Provocation	Dark can with violet tribal tattoo pattern.	Initially released in the Dark Temptation gift set, but now as a lone product. Crisp Coconut & Black Pepper fragrance.	Present
2012	Attract or Anarchy	Attract for him deodorant in a dark can with blue spray top.	Advertised as capable of attracting women and causing chaos in the process.	Present
2012	Young	Black can with turquoise details	Designed with the younger ladies in mind... but not too young!	Discontinued but still available in some countries.
2012	Mature	Black can with red details	An irrestible smell that can even attract the most experienced women. Infinite female attention.	Discontinued
2012	Axe Anarchy for Her	White can with pink details	This is the first product for woman of the Company.	Present
2013	Apollo	Dark can with turquoise spray top and lightning bolt logo.	This relaunched version has a fresher fragrance compared to the original.	Discontinued in UK but still available in some countries.
2013	Deep Space	Similar can to "Apollo".	Possible variant or Limited Edition of "Apollo".	2015
2013	Black Chill	Black and silver can.	Body spray has never been advertised.	Present
2013	Peace	Dark can with "peace" sign	Make love, not war	Discontinued
2013	Harmony	Teal colored can with a peace sign	Launched alongside "Peace".	Discontinued.
2014	Gold Temptation	Gold can with similar design as "Dark Temptation"	A compliment to "Dark Temptation".	Discontinued but still available in some countries.
2015	Black	Minimalistic designed can with very dark Axe logo	Subtle and finetuned smell: "less is more". Marketed with the Blackstage concerts. there is also a «night version».	Present
2016	You	Minimalistic designed can with "You" underlined.	Special "Movember" edition in black and blue can in Australia and New Zealand.	Discontinued as of 2023.
2017	Australia	Green, Black, Gold can with stylised Australia logo.	Variants named after the country. Only available in Australia and New Zealand.	Present
2019	Ice Chill	Black and blue can design	Cools down your skin by 11° when sprayed into skin	Present
2019	Xbox	Black and green can design with Xbox logo	Lynx partned with Xbox. Available only in Australia and New Zealand. Also available in antiperspirant spray and body wash.	Discontinued in 2020.
2020	Leather & Cookies	Black can with leather and cookies fragrance		Discontinued in UK but still available in some countries.
2021	"Recharge/Phoenix"	Deodorant can has a background pattern all over it. Arctic Mint & Cool Spices scent.	Also known as Phoenix in Russia.	Discontinued as of 2024, in UK & Ireland.
2022	Epic Fresh/Infinite	Black and green can with grapefruit and pineapple fragrance		Present
2024	Jungle Fresh	Black and green can with palm leaves and amber fragrance		Present
2025	Sunset Fresh	Black and orange can with an island on it. Mango & Mandarin scent.		Present
2026	Number 10	Marine essence, Citrus & Watermelon scent, though the shower gel has a different scent.	Released in some countries with a limited edition FIFA World Cup pack.	Present

== Limited Edition variants ==
Axe also occasionally launches limited edition variants that may be on sale for a few months or over a year.

Year	Limited Edition Name	Description	Notes	Year of Discontinuation
1998	Systeme or Skin Systeme	Limited edition fragrance that came out in South America.	Re-hydrating aftershave was released in the UK.	2000
2000	Millennium or Zero	Limited edition for the start of the new millennium.	Released in Australia and South America only.	2001
2001	White Label		Released in conjunction with the Euphoria White Label Music event, this limited edition variant was available in the UK for a short period of time.	2002
2002	Blue Ice	Cold and fresh fragrance.	?	2003
2004(?)	Relapse		Comes in a blue and black can.	
2006	Lab	Eau de Toilette	The first original eau de toilette released in USA.	2010?.
2004	Air	Light fresh fragrance. Same scent as "Ready."	Available as a shower gel too. Still available in some stores.	2006
2005	Ready	Long-lasting effect makes you always ready for "action", blue colored can. Same scent as "Air."	Clearly states it's a very limited edition, came out with the willing scent.	2008
2005	Willing	Long-lasting effect makes you always willing for "adventure", green colored can.	Clearly states it's a very limited edition, came out with the ready scent.	2008
2004/2006?	Below 0 or Get Fresh	Cold and fresh fragrance.	Advertising shows a girl kissing a boy and the tongue of the girl gets frozen, as she licks him... like what most people do to poles in the freezing Winter. Also available as a shower gel. Still available in some stores.	2009
2006 (?)	Silver Fusion	Exclusive to Germany.	A German variant, that came in an all silver can. A different fragrance to the American "Fusion" variant.	2007
2006/2007	3	A pack of two cans of Axe. One is called one, the other is called two... obviously. Both should be sprayed together to make a new smell.		2009
2007	Shock	Menthol/Ice mint scent	One of the three scents released by Axe under limited edition status. Based on a shower gel and comes in shower gel and body spray form. Released in U.S. in 2007.	Present (UK: 2011)
2008	Recovery or Recover or Anti-Hangover	Citrus scent	One of the three scents released by Axe under limited edition status. Based on a shower gel and comes in shower gel and body spray form. Released in U.S. & other countries in 2008.	Present
2008	Fever or Hot Fever	A fragrance infused with Brazilian hot mud and red dragon fruit extract.	One of the three scents released by Axe under limited edition status. Comes in shower gel and body spray form. Released in U.S. in 2008.	Discontinued,
2008	DRY Sharp Focus	An anti-perspirant, not available as deodorant body-spray. Only available as anti-perspirant body spray, deodorant stick, and roll-on. Menthol or Fresh mint scent.	Advertising features a man that stays focused when he sprays himself with Axe. Is only available in DRY, not normal.	Discontinued.
2006	Jet	Sweet and fresh fragrance. Not available as a shower gel, in Australia, that is.	The advertising for this fragrance (in Australia) is shown as a fake flying company with very sexy stewardesses. First released to Aussies in 2006 and released for the first time in the UK in April 2011 as an exclusive to Boots stores. A Shower Gel was released in the US in 2012.	2008 (UK: Late 2011/Early 2012)
2008	Day and Night	An deodorant to use for the day, and the other for the night.	Advertising says that one is suitable for everyday, the other is not. Night was released in the UK as a stand-alone Limited Edition exclusively available in Asda. A shower gel was also available.	2010 (UK: Night only: 2011)
2008	Boost or Ignite	Warm Guava Scent.	Based on a shower gel.	Discontinued
2009	Heat	Warm Citrus Scent.	Available in Shampoo only. This Limited Edition Shampoo + Conditioner came out with Freeze anti-itch shampoo. The scent seems to rival the Fever body wash and body spray line of products.	Winter 2009
2009	Proximity sub-label: Amber, Bergamot, and Vetiver	Three scents under the Proximity name. Lighter, more sophisticated fragrances targeted at less juvenile men. Sold at a higher price than regular Axe range. Comes in body spray only.		2010
2009	Summer	Is a light variant, light and sweet lime fragrance.	Limited Edition, called "Cool Summer" in Australia	Fall/Autumn 2009
2009	Music Star Guitar and Music Star Drums	Available in South America	Is a repackaging of the Mirage fragrance from the 90's. Also available as a shower gel Body Spray Dry Anti-perspirant and shower gel are sold exclusive to Tesco in the UK and Ireland as Musicstar.	Present
2010	DRY+ Sensitive	Anti-Perspirant designed for sensitive skin.	Only available as an anti-perspirant and roll-on.	Present
2010	Play 2010	Available in Argentina and Chile	Many colors and PLAY2010 on the bottle.	Discontinued once the World Cup for that year ended.
2010	ex_friends	This limited edition bottle is green, with a bolt on the middle	Available now in Central America.	Discontinued in 2011/2012.
2010	Legend	Limited Edition Australian variant	Bottled in an all yellow bottle and used the famous Axe beach advertisement. Comes with a simply irresitable warning on the bottle.	Present
2010	Alpha	Limited Edition alpha male variant	Exclusively available in Boots stores in the United Kingdom. The shower gel is a re-released version of Transform	2011
2010	Full Control	Dry	Available in Argentina and Chile initially but now released widely.	Discontinued
2011	Googly	Cricket Special Edition	Launched in India during ICC Cricket World Cup 2011.	Discontinued.
2011	2012	Limited Edition fragrance initially released in Mexico before a worldwide release.	Backed with a mythical ark marketing ploy illustrating the rumoured end of the world in 2012.	Present
2011	Absolute	Dry	An anti-perspirant available in South America.	Present
2011	Ciao	Australian Limited Edition deodorant	Only available in Coles Supermarket in Australia and features an Italian theme.	2011... considering it was a limited edition scent.
2011	Sport Blast	Designed to re-energise after sport	Comes in an all blue bottle and released with a shower gel.	Discontinued
2012	Attract or Anarchy For Her	Special edition of the popular fragrance	The first edition of Axe available for women.	Present
2012	Black collection	Eau de Toilette limited edition collection	An exclusive of 6 fragrances exclusively released on the UK Lynx Facebook page. The fragrance packs are loaded into a USB chargeable holder. Varieties are: Sunlight Seduction, Noon Temptation, Afternoon Intrigue, Evening Encounter, Midnight Embrace, Passion By Night.	Present
2013	Random	There are 3 fragrances	The three bottles makes the name AXE.	Present
2013	Mature	It's a limited edition of the duo mature/young axe	The bottle is Red.	Present
2013	Anarchy For Her II	Uplifting and lively citrus	The second edition of Axe available for women.	Present
2013	Below Zero	Light blue bottle with frost surrounding the Axe name.	Probably a re-release of the 2006 Below-0 and Get Fresh...	Present
2018	Martin Garrix	Black and purple/green/gold can design with Martin Garrix logo	Martin Garrix released 2 songs for the product: Burn Out in 2018 and These Are The Times in 2019. Available in Latin America, Netherlands, France, Spain, Portugal, Hungary, Poland, Slovakia, Slovenia, Czech Republic, and Arabia.	Discontinued
2019	Harumkan Indonesia	Black can design with rock style like design	Available only in Indonesia.	Present
2020	"Africa & Marmite"	Limited edition scent part of the Collisions range, with a mix between the most beloved Lynx fragrance and the most divisive spread known to man... known as the Social Distancing fragrance according to some people.	UK exclusive	2021
2021	Java	Limited edition and re-release in UK.	Can is the same design as the 90's version with some minor changes to the icon and a Snapchat code on the rear, granting you a filter. The Lynx Dry can was a rather subtle reference to the 2007 antiperspirant cans. Superdrug exclusive, starting in 2022.	Discontinued as of 2026.
2021	Magnum Gold Caramel Billionaire/Double Caramel	Released as a tie-in for the Unilever-owned at the time Magnum Gold Caramel Billionaire ice cream.	Released in selected countries.	Present
2025	White can actual Axe	Limited edition, released in the U.S. in September/October 2025. No words on it except for the details on the back.	Present	
2026	Y2K Reboot collection	3 limited edition fragrances that are 'remixed' versions of old Axe scents. This includes 2002's Kilo, 2004's Touch and 2012's Anarchy.	USA only.	Present

== Fine Fragrance Collection/Premium Collection ==
Premium range of body sprays / deodorant sticks / shower gels. Available products and names may vary by country.

Year	Name	Description	Notes	Year of Discontinuation
2023	Aqua Bergamot // Aqua Citrus	Sage + Juniper Scent	Released as an Eau De Parfum in 2026, in select countries.	Present
2023	Blue Lavender	Mint + Amber Scent	Released as an Eau De Parfum in 2026, in select countries.	Present
2023	Emerald Sage // Emerald Geranium // Green Geranium	Cedar + Patchouli Scent		Present
2023	Pure Coconut // White Oak	Coconut + Eucalyptus + Oak scent		Present
2023	Copper Santal // Fire Santal	Brown Sugar + Pepper scent		Present
2023	Purple Patchouli	Citrus + Oak Scent	Released as an ASDA exclusive in UK and Dunnes Stores exclusive in Ireland, in 2025.	Present
2023	Golden Mango	Mandarin + Vetiver scent		Present
2024	Royal Pineapple	Grapefruit + Oakmoss scent		Present
2024	Spiced Latte	Cardamom + Patchouli scent		Present
2024	Black Vanilla	Orange + Sandalwood scent		Present
2025	Cherry Spritz // Cherry Fizz	Red Apple + Amber scent		Present
2025	Cocoa Velvet	Vanilla + Cedarwood scent		Present
2025	Peach Infusion	Patchouli + Amber scent		Present
2025	Watermelon Freeze	Key Lime + Sage scent		Present
2026	Indigo Haze	Lavender + Caramel/Molten Sugar scent		Present
2026	White Vetiver	Cedar + Patchouli scent		Present
2026	Marshmallow Smoke	Vanilla + Dark Musk scent	Released in a limited edition FIFA World Cup pack	Present
2026	Midnight Amber	Hazelnut + Sandalwood/White Pepper, Amber & Sandalwood scent	Released as a Superdrug & Savers exclusive in the UK & Ireland.	Present

== Axe shower gels ==
Year	Name	Description	Notes	Year of Discontinuation
2002	Shower Shake:Speed and Contact	Shower gel that contained both a shower gel and a moisturiser		Speed: Present Contact: 2006
2002, 2003 or 2004	Recover or Anti-Hangover or After Hours	Green colour shower gel with a Citrus Scent	Advertised as containing stimulating Mg-O2/electrolytes to get you out of that slump. Also available as body spray.	Discontinued but still available in some countries.
2004	Skin Contact:Sensitive, Hydrating, Purifying, Smoothing and Revitalizing	Smooths Skin	Sensitive is a newer version, with revitalizing being the newest.	Discontinued
2004	Groove or Night Attack	Guarana scent with light musk and power beads. Also known as Transform.		Discontinued (UK:2007)
2004	Sunrise	An orange shower gel designed to waken you up in the morning.		2007
2005	Re-Load	A blue coloured shower gel.		Present, in some countries. (UK:2007)
2006	Boost or Ignite	Warm Guava Scent	A red coloured shower gel, also available as body spray.	Discontinued
2006	Thai Massage	Bali Sea Salt and Tigergrass. Teal coloured shower gel with little yellow beads.	Advertising for this shower gel uses Thunderbirds-like puppets, with the main character (Rod) using the shower gel to 'loosen up' for the ladies, especially his lover, Lucy. The ad would be recycled (& slightly edited) for the Japanese 'Full Moon Party' campaign in 2008.	Discontinued (UK: 2011)
2007	Shock	Icy Mint Scent		Present
2005/2006	Snake Peel or Skin Resurrection	A mix of cactus oil and desert minerals.		Present (UK:2009)
2009	Hot Fever or Fever	A fragrance infused with Brazilian hot mud and red dragon fruit extract	It was promoted largely at T4 on the beach on 19 July 2009 which had the guy from the advert dance on stage with his dancers. The advert has got the slogan "Muchas Maracas", promo maracas and samples of the shower gel were given away during T4 to promote. Released in U.S. & other countries in 2009.	Discontinued
2010	Rise or Rise Up	Yellow shower gel with Himalayan minerals with Lime Extract	Also available as deodorant.	Discontinued
2012	Excite	Purple colored gel with refreshing crisp coconut and black pepper scent.	Also available as deodorant.	Present
2013	"Deep Space"	White shower gel with a "heat release" fragrance to chill out.	Released alongside Apollo.	2017
2019	Ice Chill	Blue shower gel with menthol. Iced Mint & Lemon scent.		Present.
2026	Coconut Crusader			Present

== Axe shampoos ==
Year	Name	Description	Notes	Year of Discontinuation
2000	Control	The first shampoo released by Lynx UK.	Part of a major re-brand that included razor blades and barber products. Advertising featured Wolfboy, a sideshow freak who was once hated by the crowd but thanks to the power of Lynx/Axe Shampoo, he becomes a sensation due to his handsome style.	2002
2000	Energise or Energy	Peppermint shampoo.	Part of a major re-brand that included razor blades and barber products. Re-Released as a shaving gel.	2004
2008	Constrict or Clean & Control	Shampoo that de-poofs your hair.	Part of the Axe hair crisis relief products.	Present
2008	Dual or 2 in 1	Shampoo and conditioner.	Part of the Axe hair crisis relief products.	Present
2008	Intense or Deep Clean	Removes product build-up and scrubs your hair.	Part of the Axe hair crisis relief products.	Present
2008	Armor or Anti-Dandruff	Removes dandruff from hair.	Part of the Axe hair crisis relief products.	Present
2008	Primed or Just Clean	Just shampoo.	Part of the Axe hair crisis relief products.	Present
2008	Lure or Just Soft	Just conditioner.	Part of the Axe hair crisis relief products.	Present
2009	Freeze or Itch Relief	Soothes the itch and gets rid of flakes.	Part of the Axe hair crisis relief products. This shampoo seems to follow the Shock line of products.	Present
2009	Heat	2 in 1 shampoo + conditioner. Warm citrus scent.	Part of the Axe hair crisis relief products. This shampoo has been marketed under Limited Edition status. This shampoo supposedly follows the Fever line of products.	Winter 2009/Re-Released
2010	Zen	Gets you calm and centered so you can focus on the day (or night) ahead.	Part of a new set.	Present
2010	Downpour	Gives you a refreshing clean so you're ready for whatever lies ahead.	Part of a new set.	Present
2016	You	Minimalistic designed can with "You" underlined	Special "Movember" edition in black and blue in Australia and New Zealand.	Discontinued

== Axe hair stylers ==
Year	Name	Description	Notes	Year of Discontinuation
2000	Short Stuff Wax	Designed for short hair.	Initially released in 2000 then re-released as part of the Axe Hair range.	2004
2002	Control Freak Styling Gel	Helps keep you hair under control.	Part of the Axe Hair Range.	2004
2000	Invisible Hair Gel	Clear hair gel.	Part of the Axe Hair Range.	2004
2008	Charged or Spiked-Up Look	Spikes up your hair.	Part of the Axe hair crisis relief products.	Present
2008	Laid Back or Shaggy Look	Gives you an easy looking hair.	Part of the Axe hair crisis relief products.	Present
2008	Whatever or Messy Look	Gives you a messy look.	Part of the Axe hair crisis relief products.	2022
2008	Refined or Clean-Cut Look	Gives you a clean cut, polished looking hair.	Part of the Axe hair crisis relief products.	Present
2009	Sleek or Smooth & Sophisticated Look	Provides extra shine and control so that you can get sophisticated hair.	Part of the Axe hair crisis relief products.	Present
2010	Natural & Understated Look	For a light hold and natural looking hair.	Part of the Axe hair crisis relief products.	Discontinued
2010	Crew Cut & Buzzed Look	A buzzed look that's soft and protected with SPF15.	Part of the Axe hair crisis relief products.	Discontinued
2011	Hold + Touch: Spiking Glue	Spikes up your hair. For normal hair	Part of the Axe Hold + Touch range, released as Strong Cream Gel in Europe.	Discontinued
2011	Hold + Touch: Cream Wax	Spikes up your hair. For thick hair	Part of the Axe Hold + Touch range, released as Extra Strong Cream Gel in Europe.	Discontinued
2011	Hold + Touch: Paste	Spikes up your hair. For fine hair	Part of the Axe Hold + Touch range.	Discontinued
