= HMS Apollo =

Nine ships of the Royal Navy have borne the name HMS Apollo, after the Greek god Apollo:

- HMS Apollo (1747) was 20-gun storeship captured from the French in 1747 and wrecked in 1749 off Madras.
- HMS Apollo was a 32-gun fifth-rate launched in 1763 as HMS Glory. She was renamed in 1774, and was broken up in 1786.
- HMS Apollo (1794) was a 38-gun fifth-rate launched in 1794 and wrecked in 1799 off Holland.
- HMS Apollo (1799) was a 36-gun fifth-rate launched in 1799 and wrecked in 1804 off Portugal.
- HMS Apollo (1805) was a 38-gun fifth-rate launched in 1805. She was put in harbour service, followed by use as a troopship in 1846 and was broken up in 1856.
- HMS Apollo (1891) was an Apollo-class protected cruiser launched in 1891. She was converted into a minelayer in 1909 and was broken up in 1920.
- HMS Apollo was a Leander-class light cruiser launched in 1934. She was transferred to the Royal Australian Navy in 1938, and renamed HMAS Hobart.
- HMS Apollo (M01) was an Abdiel-class minelayer launched in 1943 and broken up in 1962.
- HMS Apollo (F70) was a Leander-class frigate launched in 1970. She was sold to the Pakistan Navy in 1988 and renamed Zulfiquar.

== Battle honours ==
Ships named Apollo have earned the following battle honours:

- St Vincent 1780
- China 1842
- Crimea 1854
- Normandy 1944

== See also ==
- Apollo (disambiguation)
