= Apollo (1812 EIC ship) =

1812 British East India Company ship

History

- Name: Apollo
- Namesake: Apollo
- Owner: John Staniforth
- Builder: Thomas Steemson, Paull, Hull
- Launched: 3 January 1812
- Fate: Wrecked in 1823

General characteristics
- Tons burthen: 652, or 6526/94, or 686RS, or 693(bm)
- Length: Overall:127 ft 2 in (38.8 m); Keel:100 ft 6 1/2 in (30.6 m)
- Beam: 34 ft 11 in (10.6 m)
- Depth of hold: 13 ft 1 in (4.0 m)
- Propulsion: Sail
- Complement: 82
- Armament: 20* 18-pounder guns
- Notes: Three decks

Apollo was launched in 1812 at Hull. She made three voyages for the British East India Company (EIC) as a regular ship. She continued to trade with India under licence from the EIC until she was wrecked near Cape Town in 1823.

== Career ==
EIC voyage #1 (1812–1813): Captain Charles Bryan Tarbutt acquired a letter of Marque on 17 April 1812. He sailed from Portsmouth on 4 June, bound for Bengal and Batavia. Apollo reached Mauritius on 8 September, and arrived at Kedgeree on 17 November. For the second leg of her voyage, she passed Saugor on 18 January 1813. She reached Malacca on 14 February and arrived at Batavia on 24 February. She then visited two ports in the region — Banda on 19 April and Amboina on 23 May — before returning to Batavia on 27 June. (Note: Apollo was probably at Batavia on 9 May. On that day the Collector of Government Customs and Revenues authorized Tarbutt to export 12,000 sicca rupees (approx.£2,400) for advance payment for his crew's wages and for expenses at Amboina.) Homeward bound, she reached St Helena on 3 September, but did not arrive back at Blackwall until 21 May 1814.

EIC voyage #2 (1815–1816): Captain Tarbutt sailed from The Downs on 15 April 1815, bound for Bengal and Bombay. Apollo reached Madeira on 25 April and arrived at Calcutta on 10 September. On 11 November she passed Saugor and on 2 January 1816 arrived at Bombay. Homeward bound, she was at Tellicherry on 5 February. On 7 March she put into Mauritius much damaged from a gale that had also washed away a considerable part of her cargo of sugar. She reached the Cape of Good Hope on 22 April, and St Helena on 11 May. She arrived back at Blackwall on 17 July.

EIC voyage #3 (1819–1820): Captain George Tennant sailed from The Downs on 22 April 1819, bound for China. Apollo reached Whampoa Anchorage on 23 August. Homeward bound, she was at Macao on 22 November, reached St Helena on 6 February 1820, and arrived at Blackwall on 10 April.

Lloyd's Register for 1821 shows her master changing from C. Tarbutt to G. Tennant. She also underwent a good repair in 1821. However, her owner is still listed as Staniforth. Her trade is London–Bombay.

Charles Tarbutt purchased a 3/8 share in Apollo circa 1821. The owners of the 5/8 were William Tennant and John Nesbitt. Tarbutt objected to the voyage to India the other two partners wished to pursue. From August 1821 Tarbutt filed various injunctions that were not lifted until 23 November after the other two owners agreed to two bonds amounting to £3000 in favor of Tarbutt.

On 28 December 1821 Apollo grounded on Margate Sand for several hours as she was on her way to Madras. A boat from Margate got her off and provided her with an anchor. She had not suffered material damage. Still, she returned to the Thames as a consequence of the grounding.

Captain George Tennant sailed for Madras on 27 February 1822.

== Fate ==
On 14 April 1823 Apollo was wrecked on Green Point, Cape of Good Hope, while on her way to London from Bengal and Madras. Lloyd's List reported on 27 June that she was on shore near Moulin Battery, and a complete wreck. The passengers and crew, except for the cook, were saved; the cook had been killed by the explosion of a gun fired as a signal when she first grounded. Although the weather was good and 100 men laboured to save the vessel, neither Apollo nor the valuable part of her cargo could be saved.

In November 1823 Tarbutt sued Tennant and Nesbit for payment of £3000 bond that they posted. The court decided in Tarbutt's favor.
