= USS Apollo =

Tender of the United States Navy

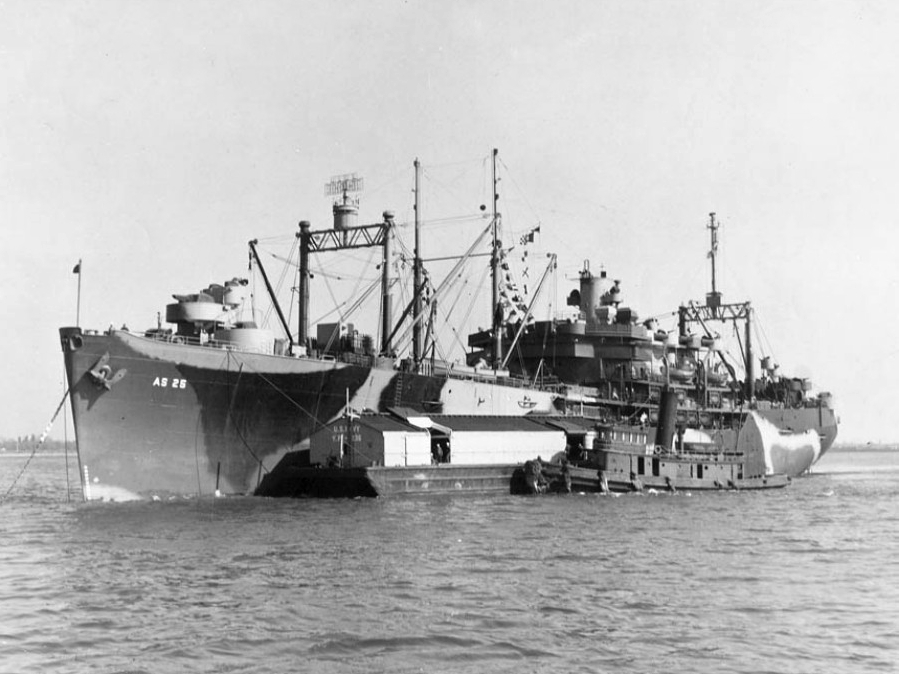
- USS Apollo (AS-25), loading supplies off New York circa late 1944. Covered lighter YF-236 and a tug are alongside.

History

United States
- Name: Apollo
- Namesake: Apollo
- Ordered: as type (C3-S-A2) hull, MC hull 860
- Builder: Ingalls Shipbuilding, Pascagoula, Mississippi
- Laid down: 24 June 1943
- Launched: 6 November 1943
- Acquired: 31 December 1943
- Commissioned: 31 December 1943 (reduced commission)
- Decommissioned: 14 January 1944
- Commissioned: 29 September 1944 (full commission)
- Decommissioned: 12 February 1946
- Stricken: 1 July 1963
- Identification: Hull symbol: AS-25; Code letters: NUVA
- Fate: Sold for scrapping, 1974

General characteristics
- Class & type: Aegir-class submarine tender
- Displacement: 16,500 long tons (16,800 t) (full)
- Length: 492 ft 6 in (150.11 m)
- Beam: 69 ft 6 in (21.18 m)
- Draft: 27 ft (8.2 m)
- Installed power: 2 × Foster–Wheeler D-type 465 psi (3,210 kPa) 765 °F (407 °C) steam boilers; 8,500 shp (6,300 kW)
- Propulsion: 1 × General Electric steam turbine; General Electric double reduction main gears; 1 × Propeller
- Speed: 18.4 kn (34.1 km/h; 21.2 mph)
- Complement: 82 Officers 1,378 Enlisted
- Armament: 1 × 5 in (127 mm)/38 caliber dual-purpose gun; 4 × single 3 in (76 mm)/50 cal guns; 2 × twin 40 mm (1.6 in) Bofors anti-aircraft (AA) mounts; 20 × 20 mm (0.8 in) Oerlikon cannons AA

USS Apollo (AS-25) was an Aegir-class submarine tender in the United States Navy.

== Construction ==
Apollo was laid down under a United States Maritime Commission contract, MC hull 860, on 24 June 1943 at Pascagoula, Mississippi, by the Ingalls Shipbuilding Corporation; launched on 6 November 1943; sponsored by Mrs. James B. Hill; and acquired by the Navy and placed in reduced commission on 31 December 1943 for passage to her conversion yard. The vessel proceeded to the Atlantic Basin Iron Works, Brooklyn, New York, and was decommissioned there on 14 January 1944 to undergo conversion for naval service as a submarine tender. Apollo was recommissioned on 29 September 1944.

== Service history ==
=== Pacific Fleet, 1944–1945 ===
After loading stores, the new submarine tender got underway for shakedown in the waters off New London, Connecticut, and in Block Island Sound. She then took on spare parts and equipment at New London before departing Connecticut on 6 November, bound for the Panama Canal.

Apollo transited the Panama Canal on 13 November; paused briefly at San Diego, California, for replenishment; and continued on to Pearl Harbor, Hawaii. On 10 December, the ship set a course for Guam, Mariana Islands, and arrived in Apra Harbor 11 days later. She then commenced providing services to various submarines of the Pacific Fleet. Her tour of duty at Guam ended on 10 July 1945, when the vessel got underway to return to Pearl Harbor. Shortly after her arrival, her crew resumed submarine tending activities.

Following the Japanese capitulation, Apollo set sail on 27 August for the east coast of the United States. She transited the Panama Canal on 12 September and continued on to New Orleans, where she dropped anchor on the 16th. The ship resumed her voyage on 30 October; arrived at Yorktown, Virginia, on 3 November; and began unloading her ammunition. Four days later, Apollo sailed on to New London. Upon reaching that port on the 8th, the tender took up the task of placing submarines of the New London Group, 16th Fleet, in an inactive status.

=== Decommissioning, 1946–1974 ===
On 16 October 1946, Apollo was placed in commission, in reserve. She was decommissioned on 12 February 1947 and was berthed at New London. On 1 July 1963, her name was struck from the Navy list, and the vessel was transferred to the Maritime Administration for layup in the James River. She was sold to the Union Minerals & Alloys Corporation for scrapping in 1974.

== Notes ==
Citations

== Bibliography ==
Online resources

- "Apollo (AS-25)". Dictionary of American Naval Fighting Ships. Naval History and Heritage Command. 5 July 2016. This article incorporates text from this source, which is in the public domain.
