= Rialto Records (1920s) =

American record label

- Parent company: Rialto Music House
- Country of origin: United States

Rialto Records was a record label based in Chicago, Illinois in the 1920s. It was owned by the Rialto Music House (330 S State St), sold at their stores at promotional prices. The records themselves were pressed by Marsh Recording Laboratories (Suite 625 Kimball Building, 306 South Wabash Avenue, Chicago, Illinois).

The most famous record they produced was the only release known of Jelly Roll Morton's unaccompanied recording of "London Blues," made in 1924.
