= Tarheel Slim =

American singer (1923–1977)

Background information
- Also known as: Allen Bunn; Alden Bunn; Allen Baum
- Born: Allen Rathel Bunn; September 24, 1923; Bailey, North Carolina, U.S.
- Died: August 21, 1977 (aged 53) New York City, U.S.
- Genres: Gospel, blues, doowop, R&B, pop, rockabilly
- Occupations: Singer, guitarist, songwriter
- Years active: c.1940–1963, c.1970–1977
- Formerly of: The Selah Jubilee Singers; The Larks; The Lovers; Tarheel Slim and Little Ann; Slim and Ann

Allen Rathel Bunn (September 24, 1923 – August 21, 1977), who was sometimes credited as Alden Bunn and who performed as Tarheel Slim, was an American singer, guitarist and songwriter whose work spanned gospel, blues, doowop, R&B, pop, and rockabilly. After singing in various gospel groups he became a member of The Larks before recording with his wife Anna Lee "Little Ann" Sandford, and then as a solo performer.

== Biography ==
=== Early life and career ===
Bunn was born in Bailey, North Carolina. He seems to have used both "Alden" and "Allen" as his forename at different times; researchers Bob Eagle and Eric LeBlanc state that his birth records read "Allen". Initially he worked in local tobacco fields, but by the early 1940s he had started singing with various gospel groups, including the Gospel Four and the Selah Jubilee Singers, where he joined the latter group's founder, Thermon Ruth. Bunn was the group's baritone and second lead singer, and provided guitar accompaniment.

In 1949, Ruth and Bunn decided to form a secular singing group as a spin-off from the Selah Jubilee Singers. Initially called the Jubilators, the group recorded for four different record labels in New York under four different names on one day in 1950. Eventually settling on the name The Larks, the group's recording of "Eyesight to the Blind" on the Apollo label, with lead vocals and guitar by Bunn, reached number 5 on the Billboard R&B chart in July 1951; and the follow-up, "Little Side Car", also sung by Bunn, reached number 10 on the R&B chart later the same year. The Larks then toured with Percy Mayfield and Mahalia Jackson. Bunn lived in New York from 1950 for the rest of his life.

Early in 1952, Allen Bunn (so credited) left for a solo career, first recording blues for Apollo, accompanied by Sonny Terry and Brownie McGhee, and then moving to Bobby Robinson's Red Robin label in 1953, when he was credited as "Alden Bunn" or "Allen Baum". Around 1955, he married Anna Lee Sandford (1935–2004), and they began singing together, recording as The Lovers for the Lamp label, a subsidiary of Aladdin Records. Their first record together, "Darling It's Wonderful", written by Bunn and arranged by Ray Ellis, reached number 15 on the R&B chart and number 48 on the Billboard pop chart, in 1957. Bunn also managed, and recorded with, a group known variously as the Wheels (on the Premium label) and the Federals (on the De Luxe label).

=== As Tarheel Slim ===
Bunn returned to solo recording, using the name Tarheel Slim, in New York in 1958, for producer Bobby Robinson's Fury label. His first recordings for Fury, "Wildcat Tamer" / "Number 9 Train", have been described by AllMusic critic Bill Dahl as "a pair of rockabilly raveups", and by another reviewer as "pinnacles of New York rock'n'roll". Both sides of the record featured guitarist Wild Jimmy Spruill as well as Bunn. However, the record was not a success at the time, and Bunn's later recordings for Robinson's Fire and Fury labels, in the late 1950s and early 1960s, were all co-credited to the duo of Tarheel Slim and Little Ann. Their first record for Fire, "It's Too Late" – described as "a doom laden dirge with Slim's tremolo laden guitar work and Ann breaking down into a sobbing fit at the end" – reached number 20 on the R&B chart in 1959; the record was also issued on the Checker label. Later records by Tarheel Slim and Little Ann covered a variety of styles, including rockabilly, but none were commercial successes. The duo recorded briefly for Atco Records in 1963, but then disappeared from view.

In the early 1970s, Tarheel Slim was "rediscovered" by researcher Peter Lowry, and emerged to play solo, with acoustic guitar in the style of Brownie McGhee, at festivals and for college audiences. He recorded an album, No Time At All, released on Trix Records in 1975, with pianist Big Chief Ellis on some tracks. He also played with John Cephas on Ellis' own 1977 album.

Tarheel Slim was diagnosed with throat cancer in 1977, and died from pneumonia brought on by chemotherapy, at the age of 53.
