= Mahalia Jackson discography =

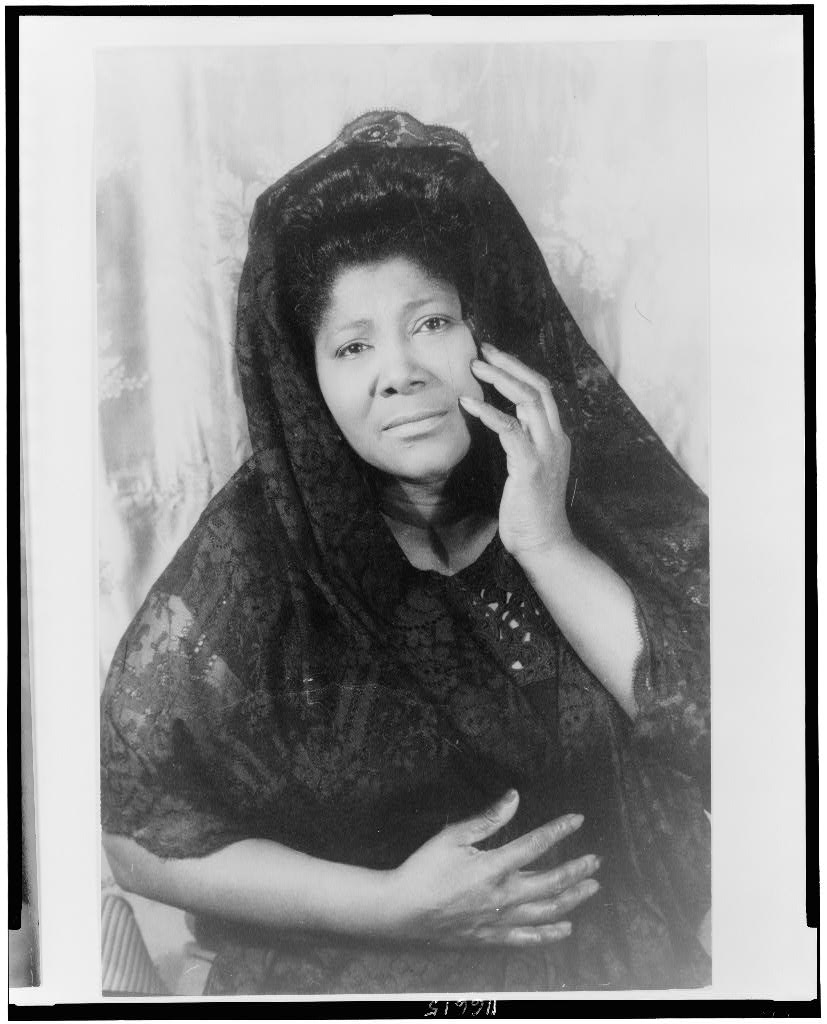

Mahalia Jackson (1911 – 1972) was the preeminent gospel singer of the 20th century, her career spanning from about 1931 to 1971. She began singing in church as a child in New Orleans, then moved to Chicago as an adolescent and joined Chicago's first gospel group, the Johnson Singers. By demand, she began to sing solo at funerals and political rallies. For about 15 years, Jackson toured a circuit of churches and revivals spreading gospel blues throughout the U.S. working odd jobs to make a living. Her first recordings were made in 1931, produced by the owner of a funeral parlor in Chicago where Jackson often sang, although these have been lost.

In 1937, Jackson recorded four singles for Decca Records, a company focusing on blues and jazz. The sales were weak and she was asked to record blues and she refused, a decision she made repeatedly throughout her life. Nine years later, she attracted the attention of Apollo Records, a small company catering to black artists and audiences. She recorded four singles for them and again they did not perform well, but the fifth one, "Move On Up a Little Higher", sold two million copies and reached the number two spot on the Billboard charts in 1947, new achievements for gospel music. Based on that success, Jackson released 71 singles in total with Apollo between 1946 and 1954. Her recordings with Decca and Apollo are widely considered defining of gospel blues: they consist of traditional Protestant hymns, spirituals, and songs written by contemporary songwriters such as Thomas A. Dorsey and W. Herbert Brewster. The earliest are sparsely accompanied by piano and organ although Apollo added acoustic guitar, bass, drum, and backup vocalists in the early 1950s.

Jackson was the first gospel artist to sign with Columbia Records, then the largest recording company in the U.S., in 1954. At Columbia, Jackson released 28 albums between 1955 and 1972, the year of her death. Columbia expanded her repertoire to include songs considered generally inspirational and patriotic which were interspersed with the hymns and gospel songs similar to the ones she sang at Apollo. Though her early records at Columbia had a sound similar to her Apollo records, the music accompanying Jackson at Columbia later included orchestras, electric guitars, backup singers, and drums, the overall effect of which was more closely associated with light pop music. She was marketed similarly to jazz musicians, but her music at Columbia ultimately defied categorization. Nonetheless, Jackson won the first Grammy Award for gospel music in 1961 and the second in 1962. Three of her songs have been included in the Grammy Hall of Fame, including "Move On Up a Little Higher" which was also added to the National Recording Registry in 2005. Jackson received the Recording Academy's Lifetime Achievement Award in 1972. She was a staple on American television in the 1950s and 1960s. She hosted The Mahalia Jackson Show that ran locally in Chicago for a few months in 1955, and appeared as a guest on many national programs. She sang in four films between 1958 and 1964 and appeared in concert halls around the world while making regular appearances at black churches in the U.S. She estimated that she sold 22 million records in her lifetime. Jackson's success ushered the "Golden Age of Gospel" between 1945 and 1965, allowing dozens of gospel music acts to tour and record.

== No Label ==
Unknown / No Label
Date	Song titles	Accompaniment	Notes
1931	"You Better Run, Run, Run"; Others unknown	If any, unknown	Jackson's agent, a funeral director named Bob Miller, arranged for her to record at a studio on Jackson Boulevard in Chicago with the intention of selling copies at National Baptist Convention meetings. According to Miller, "We'd take our bundle and the master, so we could get additional ones pressed--I don't think we ever did, but we could have. We cut quite a few." Biographer Laurraine Goreau only mentions the title "You Better Run, Run, Run" from this session. No copies of these recordings have been found.

== Decca ==
Decca Records recording session
Date	Song titles	Accompaniment	Notes
May 21, 1937	"God's Gonna Separate the Wheat From the Tares"; "Oh My Lord"; "Keep Me Every Day"; "God Shall Wipe All Tears Away"	Estelle Allen, piano and organ	Decca declined to record Jackson after this session when the records sold poorly and Jackson refused to consider recording secular songs

== Apollo ==
Apollo Records recording sessions (Note: Apollo Records dissolved in 1962.)
Date	Song titles	Accompaniment	Notes
October 3, 1946	"I Want To Rest"; "He Knows My Heart"; "Wait Til My Change Comes"; "I'm Going to Tell God"	Rosalie McKenny, piano	
September 12, 1947	"What Could I Do?"; "Move On Up a Little Higher (Part 1)"; "Move On Up a Little Higher (Part 2)"; "Even Me"; "I Have a Friend"	James Lee, piano; Herbert "Blind" Francis, organ	"Move On Up a Little Higher" reaches No. 2 for two weeks on Billboard charts, sells two million; inducted into the Grammy Hall of Fame in 1998, and added to the National Recording Registry in 2005 "Even Me" sells one million
December 10, 1947	"Dig a Little Deeper In God's Love"; "Tired"; "If You See My Savior"; "In My Home Over There"; "There's Not A Friend Like Jesus"; "Amazing Grace"; "Since the Fire Started Burning In My Soul"	Mildred Falls, piano; Herbert "Blind" Francis, organ; Samuel Patterson, guitar	"Dig A Little Deeper" sells almost one million
July 15, 1949	"I Can Put My Trust In Jesus"; "Let the Power Of the Holy Ghost Fall On Me"; "A Child Of the King"; "Get Away Jordan"; "Walk With Me"; "Prayer Changes Things"	Mildred Falls, piano; Herbert "Blind" Francis, organ; Samuel Patterson, guitar	"I Can Put My Trust in Jesus" wins Grand Prix du Disque from Académie Charles Cros
January 12, 1950	"Shall I Meet You Over Yonder"; "The Last Mile Of the Way"; "Just Over the Hill (Part 1)"; "Just Over the Hill (Part 2)"; "I Do, Don't You?"; "God Answers Prayers"; "I'm Glad Salvation Is Free"; "Do You Know Him"	Mildred Falls, piano; Herbert "Blind" Francis, organ	"Just Over the Hill" sells one million
September 11, 1950	"I'm Getting Nearer My Home"; "I Gave Up Everything to Follow Him"; "It Pays to Serve Jesus"; "These Are They"; "He's the One"	Mildred Falls, piano; Louise Weaver and Herbert "Blind" Frances, organ	
October 17, 1950	"I Walked In the Garden"; "Bless This House"; "Go Tell It on the Mountain"; "Silent Night"; "The Lord's Prayer"	Mildred Falls, piano; Louise Weaver, organ	
July 7, 1951	"How I Got Over"; "Just As I Am"; "Jesus Is With Me"; "I Bowed On My Knees and Cried Holy"; "A City Called Heaven"; "It's No Secret What God Can Do"; "His Eye Is On the Sparrow"	Mildred Falls, piano; Kenneth Morris, organ; Herbert "Blind" Francis, organ	
March 21, 1952	"God Spoke to Me"; "In the Upper Room, Part 1"; "In the Upper Room, Part 2"; "Said He Would"; "He's My Light"; "If You Just Keep Still"	Mildred Falls, piano; Herbert "Blind" Francis, organ; the Southern Harmonaires, vocals; Unknown bass and drums	"In the Upper Room" sells one million
May 5, 1953	"I'm Going Down to the River"; "One Day"	Mildred Falls, piano; Unknown organ, drums, and bass; Melody Echoes, vocals	
August 8, 1953	"I Believe"; "Beautiful Tomorrow"; "Consider Me"; "What Then?"	Mildred Falls, piano; Unknown organ, guitar, bass, and drums; Melody Echoes, vocals	
October 9, 1953	"Hands of God"; "It's Real"; "No Matter How You Pray"; "My Cathedral (The Home I Love)"	Mildred Falls, piano; Unknown organ; Belleville Choir, vocals	
October 12, 1953	"Walking to Jerusalem"; "I Wonder if I Will Ever Rest"; "Come to Jesus"	Mildred Falls, piano; Unknown organ, guitar, and drums; Melody Echoes, vocals	
June 10, 1954	"I'm On My Way to Canaan Land"; "My Story"; "I'm Willing to Run All the Way"; "Nobody Knows the Trouble I've Seen"; "Didn't It Rain"; "Closer to Me"	Mildred Falls, piano; Unknown organ, bass, percussion, and tenor saxophone	

== Columbia ==
Long playing albums
Date	Album title	Notes
1955	Sweet Little Jesus Boy CL 702 (Vinyl); The World's Greatest Gospel Singer CL 644 (Vinyl)	
1956	Bless This House (as Mahalia Jackson and the Falls-Jones Ensemble) CL 899 (Vinyl); You'll Never Walk Alone CL 2552 (Vinyl)	Bless This House includes "Take My Hand, Precious Lord", inducted into Grammy Hall of Fame in 2012
1959	Great Gettin' Up Morning CL 1343 (Vinyl)	
1960	Come On Children Let's Sing (as Mahalia Jackson with the Falls-Webb Ensemble) CS 8225 (Vinyl); I Believe CL 1549 (mono) CS 8349 (stereo) (Vinyl); The Power and the Glory CS 8264 (Vinyl)	
1961	Everytime I Feel the Spirit CL1743 (Vinyl)	Album wins first ever Grammy Award for Best Gospel or Other Religious Recording category; re-released as Best Loved Spirituals CS 8443 in 1995 (CD)
1962	Great Songs of Love and Faith CL 1824 (mono) CL 8624 (stereo) (Vinyl); Silent Night – Songs For Christmas CL 1903 (Vinyl)	Great Songs of Love and Faith receives Grammy Award for Best Gospel or Other Religious Recording
1963	Mahalia Jackson's Greatest Hits CS 8804 (Vinyl); Make A Joyful Noise Unto the Lord CS 8736 CL 1936 (Vinyl)	Make a Joyful Noise Unto the Lord nominated for Grammy Award; re-released in 1972 as Lord Don't Let Me Fall Harmony KH 31111 (Vinyl)
1964	Let's Pray Together CL 2130 (Vinyl)	
1966	Mahalia Sings CS 9252 (Vinyl)	
1967	My Faith CS 9405 (Vinyl)	
1968	A Mighty Fortress CS 9659 (Vinyl); Christmas with Mahalia CS 9727 (Vinyl); Garden of Prayer CL 2546 (Vinyl); Mahalia Jackson Sings the Best-Loved Hymns of Dr. Martin Luther King Jr. CS 9686 (Vinyl)	
1969	Mahalia! Sings the Gospel Right out of Church CS 9813 (Vinyl); What the World Needs Now CS 9950 (Vinyl)	
1971	Mahalia Jackson Sings America's Favorite Hymns G 30744 (Vinyl); Silent Night – Songs for Christmas LE 10165 (Vinyl)	
1972	The Great Mahalia Jackson KG 31379 (Columbia) (Vinyl)	

== Live albums ==
Live albums
Date	Album title	Notes
1958	Newport 1958 Columbia CL 1244 (mono) 8071 (stereo) (Vinyl)	Includes "His Eye Is on the Sparrow" inducted into the Grammy Hall of Fame in 2010
1962	Recorded in Europe During Her Latest Concert Tour Columbia CL 1726 (Vinyl)	
1967	Mahalia Jackson in Concert Easter Sunday, 1967 Columbia CL 2690 (mono) CS 9490 (stereo) (Vinyl)	
1968	Live in Antibes, 1968 France Concert FC 122 (Vinyl)	

== Other appearances ==
Collaboration
Date	Album title	Notes
1958	Black, Brown & Beige Columbia CS 8015 CL 1162 (Vinyl)	Collaboration with Duke Ellington; Jackson performs improvisation of the 23rd Psalm

Special appearances
Date	Album title	Notes
1959	Mahalia Jackson with the Greatest Spiritual Singers Apollo LP 489 (Vinyl)	Includes "Closer to Me", "I Can Put My Trust In Jesus", and "Bless This House"
1963	All Star Festival United Nations UNM-1 (Vinyl); When They Brought Down the House Columbia XTV-69449 (Vinyl)	All Star Festival includes "Nobody But You, Lord"; When They Brought Down the House includes "A City Called Heaven"
1965	A Salute to Congress A & R Recording XSV106467 (Vinyl)	Includes "He's Got the Whole World in His Hands" and "Take My Hand, Precious Lord"
Unknown	Americana Columbia CSS-934-5 (Vinyl)	Includes "When the Saints Go Marching In"
Unknown	Christmas Greetings Columbia CSS-1499 (Vinyl)	Includes "Hark! The Herald Angels Sing"

== Compilations ==
Compilation albums released in the U.S.
Date	Album title	Notes
1954	Queen of the Gospel Singers Apollo LP 201 (Vinyl)	
1958	Just As I Am Apollo LP 479 (Vinyl)	
1959	In the Upper Room with Mahalia Jackson Apollo LP 474 (Vinyl); No Matter How You Pray Apollo LP 482 (Vinyl); Mahalia Apollo LP 486 (Vinyl)	
1961	Command Performance, Volume 1 Apollo ALP 1001 (Vinyl); Command Performance, Volume 2 Apollo ALP 1002 (Vinyl)	Formally titled Apollo Records Requests the Honor Of Your Presence At the Command Performance Of Mahalia Jackson Re-Creating Her European Concert Tour although the tracks included Jackson's Apollo recordings up to 1954 as opposed to material from her 1961 European tour
1962	Christmas With Mahalia Jackson Apollo ALP 499	
1968	You'll Never Walk Alone Harmony HS 11279 (Vinyl)	
1972	Mahalia Jackson 1911 – 1972 Kenwood/Nashboro LP 506 (Vinyl)	
1973	God Answers Prayers Nashboro 508, Kenwood 508 (Vinyl); The Life I Sing About Caedmon TC 1413 (Vinyl)	The Life I Sing About includes four music tracks and spoken word interviews of Jackson recalling her childhood in New Orleans
1976	How I Got Over Columbia KC 34073 (Vinyl); The Best Of Mahalia Jackson - Hymns, Spirituals & Songs Of Inspiration Columbia P3-14028 (Vinyl)	How I Got Over receives Grammy Award for Best Soul Gospel Performance
1977	Amazing Grace Sony Special Music WK 75041WK (Vinyl)	Re-released in 1989 as a CD Columbia P 14358
1979	I Sing Because I'm Happy Folkways Records FTS 31102 (Vinyl)	
1981	Christmas With Mahalia Jackson Holiday HDY-1948 (Vinyl)	
1991	Gospels, Spirituals & Hymns Columbia C2T 47083 (Cassette)	
1992	I'm Going To Tell God MCA Special Products MCAC-20719 (Cassette)	
1993	Go Tell It On the Mountain Arrival 3149-4 (Cassette) 3149-2 (CD); Best Loved Spirituals Sony BT 13582 (Cassette) A 13582 (CD)	
1994	The Apollo Sessions 1946-1951 Pair Records PCD-2-1332 (CD)	
1995	The Best of Mahalia Jackson Legacy/Columbia CT 66911 (CD)	
1996	16 Most Requested Songs Legacy/Columbia CK 64991 (CD)	
1997	In the Upper Room 601 Music SXCD 3117 (CD)	
1998	Silent Night – Gospel Christmas LaserLight Digital 15 300 (CD);	Re-released in 2002 as Gospel Christmas With Mahalia Jackson – Silent Night
2004	The Essential Mahalia Jackson Columbia C2K 89067 (CD)	
2016	Mahalia Jackson Sings: The Great Television Performances Real Gone Music RGM-0508 (CD); Moving On Up A Little Higher Shanachie 6066 (CD)	
Unknown dates	Best of Mahalia Jackson Apollo LP 500 (Vinyl); Gospel World of Mahalia Jackson Apollo Kenwood SLP 501 (Vinyl); I Lift My Voice Kenwood LP 503 (Vinyl); Mahalia Jackson Sings Brigade Records P1303S (Vinyl); Mahalia! Mahalia! Mahalia! Kenwood SLP 504 (Vinyl); Sing Out Apollo Kenwood SLP 502 (Vinyl); The World's Greatest Gospel Singer Apollo LP 505 (Vinyl); The World's Greatest Gospel Singer Colortone C 33-4906 (Vinyl)	Apollo's and Colortone's versions of The World's Greatest Gospel Singer have different track listings
