= Lightner =

Lightner is a surname. Notable people with the surname include:

- A. M. Lightner, a pen name of Alice Lightner Hopf (1904–1988), American writer
- Calvin E. Lightner (1878–1960), American architect, building contractor and mortician
- Candy Lightner (born 1946), organizer and founding president of Mothers Against Drunk Drivers
- Clarence Lightner (1921–2002), first popularly elected mayor of Raleigh, North Carolina, and first African-American elected mayor of a Southern city of over 50,000 residents
- Gwendolyn Rosetta Capps Lightner (1925–1999), American gospel pianist, arranger, and choir director
- Mary Elizabeth Rollins Lightner (1818–1913), Mormon pioneer
- Matthew Lightner (born 1980), American chef
- Milton Lightner (1887–1967), American politician and lawyer
- Sarah Lightner, American politician
- Sherri Lightner (born 1950), American politician
- Theodore Lightner (died 1981), American bridge player
- Winnie Lightner (1899–1971), American film actress

Fictional characters include:

- Aaron Lightner, in Anne Rice's novel series The Vampire Chronicles
- Violet Lightner, better known as Armory (comics), a Marvel Comics crime fighter

== See also ==
- Lightner Witmer (1867–1956), American psychologist credited with introducing the term "clinical psychology"
- Lightner double, a conventional double in the game of bridge
- Lightner Museum of antiques, St. Augustine, Florida, United States
