= Gwendolyn Rosetta Capps Lightner =

- Lightner in 1971

Background information
- Also known as: Gwendolyn Cooper
- Born: 1925; Brookport, Illinois, U.S.
- Died: August 22, 1999 (aged 73–74) Los Angeles, California
- Genre: Gospel
- Occupation: Musician
- Instrument: Piano

Gwendolyn Rosetta Capps Lightner (1925 – August 22, 1999) was an American gospel pianist, arranger, and choir director and an influential figure within the Los Angeles gospel community. She was best known for her work as accompanist for Mahalia Jackson, and she was also a session musician for recordings by the Pilgrim Travelers, the Soul Stirrers, Brother Joe May, and Doris Akers. Lightner was also an active leader within the Baptist church for many years. Bernice Johnson Reagon, scholar, founder of Sweet Honey in the Rock, and curator emeritus in the Division of Community Life and the Smithsonian Institution's National Museum of American History called Lightner "a brilliant exponent of classical gospel playing."

== Early life and education ==
Gwendolyn Lightner was born in Brookport, Illinois in 1925, the fourth of six children, to parents Mase and Florence Capps. She began playing piano when she was 8 and by the age of 10 she was playing for her church choir and for school activities. After graduating from high school she attended Southern Illinois University in Carbondale, Illinois, where she completed her classical training. Her move to Chicago in the early 1940s to attend the Lyon and Healy Academy of Music led to a growing interest in gospel music and her into contact with many of the city's most prominent gospel musicians (among them, Kenneth Morris, Sallie Martin, Roberta Martin, Emma Jackson, and Mahalia Jackson). Kenneth Morris had begun using a new, improvisational style of piano accompaniment for gospel music that scholars call "the bounce," and when Lightner heard it, she asked Morris to teach her how to play that way. This resulted in her creation of a sound that melded Morris' looser "bounce" style with the more classic style of gospel she grew up with.

== Career ==
Lightner was a member of the Emma L. Jackson Singers when the group received an invitation to perform from the minister of Grace Memorial church in Los Angeles. They toured Los Angeles for several weeks in 1946, and during that time Lightner made the decision to stay and manage Lillian Doty's Los Angeles Gospel Music Mart studio. At the time of her arrival there was not a significant gospel music tradition in Los Angeles. Music in church services consisted primarily of traditional hymns. She was hired, together with James Earl Hines, a nationally known gospel singer and choir director, by the Reverend John L. Branham of St. Paul Baptist Church, himself a native of Chicago, who wanted to bring the midwest gospel sound into his church services. In 1946, Lightner and Hines founded St. Paul Baptist Church's Echoes of Eden choir, which would go on to be credited with revolutionizing the Los Angeles gospel music scene. From 1947 to 1949, Lightner served as the choir's first pianist. Echoes of Eden, whose membership reached over 100 singer, made its Los Angeles radio debut in February 1947. The program, which broadcast from 10:30 to 11:30 p.m., would eventually be heard in seventeen states by a listening audience of one million people, one of the largest on the West Coast at the time.

After St. Paul Baptist Church, Lightner went on to become choir director and pianist at Grace Memorial Church of God in Christ and Mount Moriah Baptist Church. In 1956, she became the musical minister for the Bethany Missionary Baptist Church, where she would remain for the next 43 years. She also taught music at the Victory Baptist Day School for almost 30 years.

Lightner was affiliated with a number of gospel groups in Los Angeles, including: the Rose of Sharon (1946–47) women's gospel trio, the J.Earle Hines Good will Singers (1947–49) and later the J. Earle Hines Goodwill Community Choir (1950s), the Sallie Martin Singers (1952–53), and the Voices of Hope community choir (1957–74). She organized and co-directed Voices of Hope with Thurston G. Frazier, and the group would go on to become nationally known through many live concert appearances and two albums for Capitol Records ("We've Come This Far by Faith," and "Walk on by Faith"). Lightner would also play piano on other gospel recordings by the Pilgrim Travelers, the Soul Stirrers, and Brother Joe May (all for Specialty Records). She is perhaps best known as the pianist for Mahalia Jackson (1968–72), whom Lightner accompanied for several world tours and many television appearances.

Lightner served as pianist for the National Baptist Convention U.S.A. for over fifty years. She was also director of music for the Western Baptist State Convention and Congress of Christian Education.
