= The Larks =

American vocal group

- Also known as: The Jubilators, The 4 Barons, The Southern Harmonaires
- Labels: Jubilee, Regal, Savoy, Apollo
- Spinoff of: Selah Jubilee Singers
- Past members: Eugene "Gene" Mumford; Allen Bunn; Thurman Ruth; Hadie Rowe Jr.; David McNeil; Raymond "Pee Wee" Barnes; Orville Brooks; Glenn Burgess; David "Boots" Bowers; Isaiah Bing

The Larks were an American vocal group, active in the early 1950s. They were not the same group as the Los Angeles–based Larks (originally The Meadowlarks) featuring Don Julian, nor the Philadelphia-based group The Four Larks.

== Original members ==
- Eugene "Gene" Mumford (June 24, 1925 – May 29, 1977) (tenor, lead)
- Allen (or Alden) Bunn (known later as Tarheel Slim) (September 24, 1923 – August 21, 1977) (baritone, lead, guitar)
- Thermon (or Thurmon) Ruth (known later as T. Ruth) (March 6, 1914 – September 13, 2002) (baritone, lead)
- Hadie Rowe Jr. (1928 – September 19, 1998) (baritone)
- David McNeil (1932 – January 8, 2005) (bass)
- Raymond "Pee Wee" Barnes (tenor)

== History ==
The group was formed in the late 1920s, when singer Thermon Ruth founded the Selah Jubilee Singers in New York City, later basing them in Raleigh, North Carolina where they had a radio show. They recorded for Decca Records and other smaller labels in the 1940s, and their membership overlapped with other religious vocal groups in the area, including The Southern Harmonaires. In 1945, Ruth tried to persuade Eugene Mumford of one of these groups, The Four Interns, to join the Selah Jubilee Singers, but before he could do so, Mumford was charged with the attempted rape of a white woman, convicted and imprisoned. He was innocent of the crime and later received a full pardon.

In 1946, Allen Bunn joined The Southern Harmonaires, and soon afterwards joined Thermon Ruth in the Selah Jubilee Singers as the group's guitarist and second lead singer. Three years later, Ruth and Bunn decided to leave to form a new group, The Jubilators. They linked up with Mumford, now released from prison, and with three members of The Southern Harmonaires, David McNeil, Hadie Rowe Jr., and Raymond "Pee Wee" Barnes.

In 1950, the six-man group drove to New York to record. On one single day, they recorded 17 songs for four different labels, under four different names. Initially, billing themselves as the Selah Jubilee Singers, they recorded four gospel songs for Jubilee Records, before moving on to record as "The Jubilators" for Regal Records in New Jersey. Then they drove to Newark, recording four secular blues songs, including "Lemon Squeezer", as "The 4 Barons" for Savoy Records. Finally, they drove back to Apollo Records in Manhattan, where, as The Southern Harmonaires, they recorded four more gospel tracks. However, Apollo owner Bess Berman realized the subterfuge. She signed them to a contract which allowed the other companies to release the other recordings, but wanted to promote them as a secular R&B rather than a gospel group.

At this point the group became The Larks, named along the lines of other "bird" groups like The Ravens and The Orioles. Their earliest recordings featured Mumford on lead vocal, on "When I Leave These Prison Walls" and "My Reverie", the latter recorded after Rowe had left the group on being drafted into the Army. However, chart success did not come until later in 1951, when the blues "Eyesight to the Blind", with Bunn on lead vocals and guitar, made No. 5 on the Billboard R&B chart. This was followed up by another R&B top ten hit, "Little Side Car", a reworking of Big Bill Broonzy's "Too Many Drivers". This period was the height of The Larks’ popularity – they appeared on the Perry Como and Arthur Godfrey TV shows, toured with Percy Mayfield, and recorded with Mahalia Jackson.

Early in 1952, however, Bunn left for a solo career, first recording blues for Apollo, accompanied by Sonny Terry and Brownie McGhee, and then moving to Bobby Robinson's Red Robin label in 1953 (on some records as "Allen Baum"). Barnes also left The Larks in early 1952 to become a R&B, jazz and rock 'n’ roll session guitarist. Shortly afterwards, McNeil also left to replace Bill Brown in The Dominoes. Thermon Ruth relocated back to North Carolina, and The Larks as a group effectively then ceased to exist for a while.

Gene Mumford joined gospel group The Golden Gate Quartet, but in 1953 he decided to return to secular music. He recruited the quartet's Orville Brooks and pianist Glenn Burgess, and singers David "Boots" Bowers and Isaiah Bing of the King Odom Four, this group then becoming the new incarnation of The Larks. Bess Berman at Apollo wanted the group to develop as a mainstream pop music group, rather than an R&B group, and they released a number of singles in that vein. They also appeared in the movie Rhythm & Blues Revue. However, commercial success eluded them, and the second Larks disbanded in 1955.

== Subsequent solo careers ==
Mumford first joined the Serenaders, and then joined David McNeil in Billy Ward & the Dominoes, where he replaced Jackie Wilson. As the Dominoes’ lead singer, he was responsible for two big hits in 1957, "Stardust" and "Deep Purple". Later, both Mumford and McNeil performed as members of a version of The Ink Spots. Mumford died in 1977. McNeil continued as a member of "The Fabulous Ink Spots" until 1989, dying in 2005.

Thermon Ruth continued his activities as a prominent and influential deejay, MC and promoter, often billed as T. Ruth. In 1955, he succeeded for the first time in the history of American entertainment in signing a gospel group, the Selah Jubilee Singers, to play in a commercial theater.

Bunn continued his musical career after his early solo recordings, initially as manager and guitarist of R&B group The Wheels and then, in 1956, as one half of The Lovers with Anna Lee Sanford, who became his wife. The pair had a minor R&B hit in 1957 with "Darling It’s Wonderful", and another in 1959 with "It’s Too Late" on Bobby Robinson's Fire label, this time credited as "Tarheel Slim and Little Ann". He also recorded in a rockabilly style, on songs such as 1959's "Number Nine Train". In the mid-1960s, Tarheel and Ann recorded soul music, and in the early 1970s Tarheel Slim made further recordings including a largely solo blues album, No Time At All, on Trix Records. As a result, Bunn performed at blues and folk festivals until his death in 1977.
