= Just a Closer Walk with Thee =

Traditional gospel song

Instrumental New Orleans jazz version by Bunk Johnson

"Just a Closer Walk with Thee" is a traditional gospel song found in the hymnals of a number of Christian denominations. It reflects the theme of growth in grace in the Christian life, presenting "the humble prayer of every Christian's heart".

The title and lyrics of the song allude to the Biblical passage from 2 Corinthians 5:7 which states, "We walk by faith, not by sight" and James 4:8, "Come near to God and He will come near to you."

As a jazz standard, it has been performed and recorded by many artists. Performed as either an instrumental or vocal, "A Closer Walk" is perhaps the most frequently played number in the hymn and dirge section of traditional New Orleans jazz funerals.

== History ==
The precise author of "A Closer Walk" is unknown. Circumstantial evidence strongly suggests it dates back to southern African-American churches of the nineteenth century, possibly even prior to the Civil War, as some personal African American histories recall "slaves singing as they worked in the fields a song about walking by the Lord's side." Horace Boyer cites a story that repudiates this claim, stating:

On a train trip from Kansas City to Chicago, composer Kenneth Morris exited the train on one of its stops to get some fresh air and heard one of the station porters singing a song. He paid little attention at first, but after he re-boarded the train the song remained with him and became so prominent in his mind that at the next stop, he left the train, took another train back to the earlier station, and asked the porter to sing the song again. Morris wrote down the words and music and published the song “Just a Closer Walk with Thee” that year, 1940, adding a few lyrics of his own to provide more breadth. Within two years the song became a standard in gospel music, eventually becoming a standard in Jazz, and then moving into the realm of American folk music, known and sung by many.

"Just a Closer Walk with Thee"

Single by Selah Jubilee Singers
- A-side: "A-Walking in the Light of God"
- Released: 1941
- Recorded: October 8, 1941
- Genre: Gospel
- Length: 3:19
- Label: Decca 7872
- Songwriter: Unknown

Songs with similar chorus lyrics were published in the 1800s, including "Closer Walk with Thee" with lyrics by Martha J. Lankton (a pseudonym for Fanny Crosby) and music by William Kirkpatrick, which was published in 1885. Some references in Atchison, Kansas, credit an African-American foundry worker and vocalist, Rev. Elijah Cluke (1907–1974), for the current rendition of the song. "Just a Closer Walk with Thee" became better known nationally in the 1930s when African-American churches held huge musical conventions. In 1940 Kenneth Morris arranged and published for the first time the well-known version after gospel musicians Robert Anderson and R.L. Knowles listened to William B. Hurse direct a performance of it in Kansas City and then brought it to Morris' attention. Morris added some new lyrics and a choral arrangement. In the 1940s, a boom of recordings recorded the number in many genres, ranging from Southern gospel to jazz and brass bands.

The first known recording was by the Selah Jubilee Singers on October 8, 1941, (Decca Records 7872) New York City; with Thurman Ruth and John Ford lead vocal; Fred Baker, lead baritone; Monroe Clark, baritone; J. B. Nelson, bass vocal; and Fred Baker on guitar. Rosetta Tharpe also recorded the song on December 2, 1941 (Decca 8594), with Lucky Millinder and His Orchestra.

The revived interest in traditional New Orleans jazz resulted in multiple recordings of the number, including a 1945 session by Bunk Johnson's Brass Band featuring numbers Johnson had played in New Orleans before he left in 1915.

In 1950, it was a #9 hit for Red Foley. While on a weekend break from the army, Elvis Presley made an unreleased recording at a friend's home in Waco, Texas, on May 17, 1958. By the beginning of the 2020s, more than seven hundred artists had recorded the song.

== Lyrics ==
Just a closer walk with Thee,
Grant it, Jesus, is my plea,
Daily walking close to Thee,
Let it be, dear Lord, let it be.

I am weak, but Thou art strong,
Jesus, keep me from all wrong,
I'll be satisfied as long
As I walk, let me walk close to Thee.

Through this world of toil and snares,
If I falter, Lord, who cares?
Who with me my burden shares?
None but Thee, dear Lord, none but Thee.

When my feeble life is o’er,
Time for me will be no more,
Guide me gently, safely o’er
To Thy kingdom's shore, to Thy shore.

== See also ==
- List of pre-1920 jazz standards
