= Big Chief Ellis =

American blues musician

Background information
- Birth name: Wilbert Thirkield Ellis
- Born: November 10, 1914 Birmingham, Alabama, U.S.
- Died: December 20, 1977 (aged 63) Birmingham, Alabama, U.S.
- Instrument(s): Vocals, piano

Wilbert Thirkield "Big Chief" Ellis (November 10, 1914 – December 20, 1977) was an American blues pianist and vocalist.

== Biography ==
Ellis was born in Birmingham, Alabama, United States, and was an autodidact at piano. He played at local parties and dances in the late 1920s before leaving Alabama, traveling the United States and working odd jobs. He served in the Army from 1939 to 1942, then moved to New York City, where he accompanied touring blues performers for their concerts there. He recorded with Lenox Records in 1945, and recorded for Capitol Records with Sonny Terry and Brownie McGhee in the 1950s.

In 1972, Ellis moved to Washington, D.C., where he operated a liquor store. Towards the end of his life, Ellis began recording for Trix Records, where he played again with McGhee as well as Tarheel Slim and John Cephas.

Ellis died in Birmingham, Alabama, of heart failure aged 63.
