= Ernest Hopf =

German-American artist

Ernest J. Hopf
- Born: February 2, 1910
- Died: July 17, 1999 (aged 89)
- Known for: printmaker
- Spouse: Alice Lightner Hopf

Ernest Hopf (1910 - 1999) was a German-American artist known for his silk screen prints.

== Biography ==
Hopf was born February 2, 1910 in Germany.

In 1935, he married the writer Alice Lightner Hopf with whom he had one child. During the 1930s Hopf was an artist with the Works Progress Administration (WPA).

In 1941 Hopf contributed an illustration the Committee for Defense of Public Education publication Winter Soldiers: The Story of a Conspiracy Against the Schools. Profits from the publication were given to the legal defense fund for the Rapp-Coudert Committee victims. Hopf provided one of the six limited-edition prints for the Silk Screen Group's 1943 calendar.

Hopf's work was included in the 1940 MoMA exhibition American Color Prints Under $10. He was also included in the 1944 Dallas Museum of Art exhibition of the National Serigraph Society.

Hopf died on July 17, 1999.

Hopf's work is in the National Gallery of Art, the National Gallery of Victoria, the Tacoma Art Museum and the Virginia Museum of Fine Arts,
