= Bess Berman =

American record label executive (1902–1968)

- Born: Bessie Merenstein; July 14, 1902; New York City, United States
- Died: August 8, 1968 (aged 66)
- Occupation: Record label executive
- Known for: Co-founder of Apollo Records
- Spouse: Isaac "Ike" Berman
- Children: Harriet Berman Merenstein (stepdaughter); Jack Berman (stepson)
- Family: Lewis Merenstein (nephew)

Bess Berman (July 14, 1902 – August 8, 1968) was an American record label executive. With her husband Isaac "Ike" Berman, Herman "Hy" Siegel and Sam Schneider, she set up Apollo Records, an independent label notable for its promotion of gospel and R&B musicians, in New York City in 1944.

== Biography ==
She was born Bessie Merenstein in New York, the fourth of seven children of Emma (né Raylies of Austria) and Louis Merenstein (né Yeuda-Leib of Courland, Latvia (Note: The Rabbi of Geldingen certified, that from Noka Mirninshtein and his wife had the following children: 1. Son Geneja born on 18 March 1875. Registered in the book of births under the number 9.; 2. Israil-Maer born 17 october 1874. Registered in the book of births under the number 39.; 3. Yeuda-Leib born 29 September 1876. Registered in the book of births under the number 42.; See File:Mirninshtein Birth Certificate.jpg.)), who were Jewish immigrants. It is likely her parents fled the uncertainty of pogroms in Europe in search of a better life in the United States where they met and married. Her father drove a beer truck and was later a hat maker; her mother was a housewife. Berman worked as an office clerk and manicurist before marrying vending machine salesman Ike Berman (né Behrman, May 16, 1897–February 5, 1956) in 1926. Ike had two children from a previous marriage: Harriet Berman Merenstein (who in 1936 married Bess' younger brother Charles Merenstein, a co-writer of the song Handy Man); and Jack Berman.

They set up Apollo Records in 1944, and she became the driving force behind its development, particularly in recruiting star performers including Mahalia Jackson, Champion Jack Dupree, The "5" Royales, Wynonie Harris, The Larks, and Solomon Burke. She took sole control of the business in 1948, while her husband ran an associated record pressing plant. According to songwriter Doc Pomus, she was "very tough... a very strong, aggressive woman." When she gave up the business after becoming ill in 1954, Cash Box described her as "the only woman ever able to break through with outstanding success in the male-dominated recording industry."

She died in 1968, although some sources give a date in 1997. Her nephew is the record producer and executive Lewis Merenstein.
