= The World's Greatest Gospel Singer =

Studio album by Mahalia Jackson
- Released: March 14, 1955
- Recorded: November 23, 1954
- Genre: Gospel
- Length: 34:54
- Label: Columbia
- Producer: George Avakian

Professional ratings
Review scores
Source	Rating
AllMusic	4.5/5 stars
The Encyclopedia of Popular Music	3/5 stars
The New Rolling Stone Record Guide	4/5 stars

The World's Greatest Gospel Singer is Mahalia Jackson's debut album on the Columbia label, recorded in 1954.

== Overview ==
Original record sleeve, written by George Avakian: "The recordings in this collection were made in the course of two consecutive evenings at Columbia's 30th Street Studio in New York City. For Mahalia's debut on the Columbia Label, Mitch Miller had asked her to prepare some new songs for single record release, and I had hoped to get a start toward making an album of spirituals and gospels songs of her own choice. Mahalia surprised and pleased us mightily. In a few hours, she made half a dozen single sides for Mitch and almost an album and a half for me. The only reason we quit was that there was limit to the amount of material we could absorb all at once."

== Recording session ==
November 23, 1954, Columbia, New York City, with The Falls-Jones Ensemble: Mildred Falls (piano), Ralph Jones (organ), Jack Lasberg (guitar), Frank Carroll (bass), Bunny Shawker (drums), and Mahalia Jackson (vocal). Columbia CL 644; Originally Released March 14, 1955.

== Track listing ==
Track	Song Title	Composer	Time
1.	I'm Going to Live the Life I Sing About in My Song	Thomas A. Dorsey	2:37
2.	When I Wake Up in Glory	Traditional; arranged by Mahalia Jackson	4:20
3.	Jesus Met the Woman at the Well	James W. Alexander, Kenneth Morris	2:28
4.	Oh Lord Is It I?	Robert Anderson	2:51
5.	I Will Move on Up a Little Higher	Rev. William Herbert Brewster	5:26
6.	When the Saints Go Marching In	Traditional; arranged by Mahalia Jackson	3:54
7.	Jesus	Aaron Coleman	2:18
8.	Out of the Depths	Thelma Gross	3:43
9.	Walk Over God's Heaven	Thomas A. Dorsey	2:38
10.	Keep Your Hand on the Plow	Traditional; arranged by Mahalia Jackson	2:31
11.	Didn't It Rain	Roberta Martin	2:32
