= Move On Up a Little Higher =

1948 song performed by Mahalia Jackson

Single by Mahalia Jackson
- Released: December 1947
- Recorded: Friday, September 12, 1947
- Genre: Gospel
- Length: 3:01
- Label: Apollo
- Songwriter: Rev. William Herbert Brewster
- Producer: Art Freeman

"Move On Up a Little Higher" is a gospel song written by W. Herbert Brewster, first recorded by Brother John Sellers in late 1946 and most famously recorded on September 12, 1947 by gospel singer Mahalia Jackson, whose version sold eight million copies and is the best-selling gospel song of all time. The song was honored with the Grammy Hall of Fame Award in (1998). In 2005, the Library of Congress honored the song by adding it to the National Recording Registry. It was also included in the list of Songs of the Century by the Recording Industry of America and the National Endowment for the Arts, and is in the Rock and Roll Hall of Fame as one of the 500 songs that shaped rock.

== Background ==
Composer Rev. William Herbert Brewster (1897-1987) composed "Moved On Up a Little Higher," through the imagery of a "Christian climbing the ladder to heaven," the song encourages black upward mobility, hence reflecting the postwar Afro-modernist sentiments:"

"The fight for rights here in Memphis was pretty rough on the Black church...and I wrote that song "Move Up a Little Higher"...We'll have to move in the field of education. Move into the professions and move into politics. Move in anything that any other race has to have to survive. That was a protest idea and inspiration. I was trying to inspire Black people to move up higher. Don't be satisfied with the mediocre...Before the freedom fights started, before the Martin Luther King days, I had to lead a lot of protest meetings. In order to get my message over, there were things that were almost dangerous to say, but you could sing it."

"Move on Up" was written for one of Brewster's religious pageants or passion plays. Brewster's maintained that the entire piece—lyrics, melody, and harmony—came to him in one flow, and shortly thereafter he taught the song to Queen C. Anderson, his principal vocal soloist. It was Mahalia Jackson who, according to Brewster, "knew what to do with it. She could throw the verse out there." Producer Art Freeman insisted Jackson record "Move on Up a Little Higher"; released in December 1947, the single became the best-selling gospel record of all time, selling in such great quantities that stores could not meet the demand. Brewster was pastor of East Trigg Avenue Baptist Church, one of the churches where young Elvis Presley studied the ecstatic moves of his gospel heroes.

== Recording sessions ==
=== First session ===
"Move on Up a Little Higher," September 12, 1947, New York City, Apollo: Mahalia Jackson (vocal), Mildred Falls (piano), and Herbert James Francis (organ).

=== Re-record session ===
"I Will Move on Up a Little Higher," New York City, November 23, 1954, Columbia, (Rev. William Herbert Brewster/Arranger Mahalia Jackson): The Falls-Jones Ensemble, with Mildred Falls (piano), Ralph Jones (organ), Jack Lasberg (guitar), Frank Carroll (bass), Bunny Shawker (drums), and Mahalia Jackson (vocal). From The World's Greatest Gospel Singer album, Columbia CL 644; Originally Released March 14, 1955.
