= Alice Lightner Hopf =

- Born: October 11, 1904; Detroit, Michigan
- Died: February 3, 1988 (aged 83); Upper Black Eddy, Pennsylvania
- Citizenship: United States
- Education: Vassar College
- Occupation: Writer
- Writing career
- Language: English

Alice Lightner Hopf (1904–1988) was an American writer who wrote young adult science fiction under the name of A. M. Lightner and youth nature books under the name of Alice Hopf. Two of her non-fiction works received awards from the National Science Teachers Association: Biography of a Rhino (1972) and Misunderstood Animals (1973).

== Biography ==
Alice Martha Lightner was born on October 14, 1904, in Detroit, Michigan to Frances (née McGraw) and Clarence Ashley Lightner. Her father was an attorney, who was a founder of the Detroit Public Library and her mother was a playwright. After graduating from Vassar College in 1927, she moved to New York and worked as a secretary, writing in her spare time. In 1935, she married Ernest Hopf, an artist originally from Germany. She and Ernest had one child, Christopher.

She was a naturalist and prolific science fiction writer during the New Wave. As other women writers did at the time, her pseudonym for her fictional works used only initials, as publishers feared boys would not read works written by women. Her juvenile fiction was published in the name of A. M. Lightner. She also published children's non-fiction books under the name of Alice L. Hopf on topics in natural history and entomology, and was a member of several New York-based scientific societies. Her non-fiction works, Biography of a Rhino and Misunderstood Animals received awards from the National Science Teachers Association in 1972 and 1973, respectively.

She died on February 3, 1988, at her home in Upper Black Eddy, Pennsylvania. She was survived by her husband, Ernest, their son, Christopher and daughter-in-law, C.C.

== Bibliography ==
Series: Rock of Three Planets:

- Rock of Three Planets (1963)
- The Planet Poachers (1965)
- The Space Ark (1968)

Novels:

- Doctor to the Galaxy (1965)
- The Galactic Troubadours (1965)
- The Space Plague (1965)
- The Space Olympics (1967)
- Wild Traveler (1967)
- The Day of the Drones (1969), a novel noted for its reversal of gender and race roles.
- The Walking Zoo of Darwin Dingle (1969)
- The Thursday Toads (1971)
- Gods Or Demons? (1973)
- Star Dog (1973)
- The Space Gypsies (1974)
- Star Circus (1977)

Non-fiction:

- Monarch Butterflies (Cromwell, 1965)
- Pigs Wild and Tame (Holiday House, 1971)
- Biography of a Rhino (Putnam, 1972)
- Misunderstood Animals (McGraw-Hill, 1973)
- Wild Cousins of the Dog (Putnam, 1973)
- Biography of an Ant (Putnam, 1974)
- Biography of an Armadillo (Putnam, 1975)
- Wild Cousins of the Cat (Putnam, 1975)
- Biography of an American Reindeer (Putnam, 1976)
- Wild Cousins of the Horse (Putnam, 1977)
- Biography of a Giraffe (Putnam, 1978)
- Animal and Plant Life Spans (Holiday House, 1978)
- Nature's Pretenders (Putnam, 1979)
- Biography of a Snowy Owl (Putnam, 1979)
- Whose House Is It? (Dodd Mead, 1980)
- Strange Sex Lives in the Animal Kingdom (McGraw-Hill, 1981)
- Biography of a Komodo Dragon (Putnam, 1981)
- Chickens and Their Wild Relatives (Dodd Mead, 1982)
- Hyenas (Dodd Mead, 1983)
- Bats (Dodd Mead, 1985)
