= Kenneth Morris (composer) =

American gospel music composer (1917–1989)

Kenneth Morris (August 28, 1917 – February 1, 1989) was an African-American composer of gospel music and publisher who popularized several songs, including "Just a Closer Walk with Thee".

Morris was born in New York in 1917 and performed in church as a youth before becoming a professional jazz musician. He studied at the Manhattan Conservatory of Music and founded a band which performed at the Chicago World's Fair in 1934. He became ill while in Chicago and decided to permanently relocate there. In Chicago, he was introduced to several prominent members of the gospel community, including Charles Henry Pace and Lillian Bowles. Morris eventually became one of the first musicians to introduce the Hammond organ to gospel music.

Morris met Sallie Martin (1896–1988), a Georgia native, in the choir at First Church of Deliverance in Chicago where she was the choir director and they co-founded Martin and Morris Music Company, the nation's oldest continuously running black gospel music publishing company, which operated from 1940 until 1989. In 1940, Morris arranged and published for the first time the well-known version of "Just a Closer Walk with Thee" after gospel musicians Robert Anderson and RL Knowles listened to William B. Hurse sing it in Kansas City and brought it to Morris's attention. Morris added some new lyrics and a choral arrangement. Morris bought out Sallie Martin's ownership in their joint business in 1973. Morris died in 1989, and his widow, Necie Seaberry Morris, ran the business until 1993.

In addition to his arrangement of "Just a Closer Walk with Thee", Morris is also noted for composing such gospel standards as "King Jesus Will Roll All Your Burdens Away", "Christ Is All", "Yes, God Is Real", and "Dig A Little Deeper in God's Love".
