= Selah Jubilee Singers =

American vocal quartet

- Origin: Brooklyn, New York, United States
- Genre: Gospel
- Years active: 1927–1953
- Labels: Decca, Mercury, Masterseal

The Selah Jubilee Singers were an American gospel vocal quartet, who appeared in public as a gospel group but who also had a successful recording career as a secular group in the 1930s & 1940s.

== History ==
Around 1927, Thermon Ruth (1914–2002) founded the Selah Jubilee Singers, a group drawn from the membership of a church choir, while he was the disc jockey at WOR in Brooklyn, New York. He later based the group in Raleigh, North Carolina when he moved his radio show to station WPTF. The Selah Jubilee Singers first recorded on April 28, 1938 for Decca, a session which included popular songs such as "Take My Hand, Precious Lord" (DE 7598), and in February 1941, "I'll Fly Away" (DE 7831). The group made the first recording of "Just a Closer Walk With Thee" (Decca Records 7872), recorded on October 8, 1941 in New York City with Thermon Ruth and John Ford, lead vocal; Fred Baker, lead baritone; Monroe Clark, baritone; J. B. Nelson, bass vocal; and Fred Baker on guitar.

By the late 1940s, the members were Ruth, Alden ("Allen") Bunn, Junius Parker, Melvin Coldten, and Jimmy Gorham. In 1949, Ruth and Bunn decided to form a secular vocal group, which became The Larks. The Larks recorded most successfully for Apollo Records, a New York City area record company, but split up in 1952.

The Selah Jubilee Singers became the first gospel group to play in the famed Apollo Theater, known for its vaudeville acts, after Therman Ruth convinced the owner, Frank Shiffman, to allow a gospel act. On December 15, 1955, the Selah Jubilee Singers debuted at the Apollo, the first gospel group to play at any commercial theater. Ruth ensured that a variety of music including gospel, jubilee, and spirituals was featured in order to broaden the appeal, though the emphasis was on rhythm as well as the emotional components of gospel.

== Selective discography ==
Year	Title	Genre	Label
1997	Complete Recorded Works, Vol. 2 (1941–1945)	Gospel	Document
2002	Selah Gospel Train (1945–1949)	Gospel	Import (Japan)
