= Thurman Ruth =

American singer (1914–2002)

- Born: March 6, 1914; Newberry County, South Carolina United States
- Origin: Brooklyn, New York; United States
- Died: September 13, 2002 (aged 88)
- Genre: Christian

Thurman Ruth (also Therman Ruth, Thermon Ruth and T. Ruth) (March 6, 1914 – September 13, 2002), who got his start in vaudeville in 1927, was a gospel singer, deejay and concert promoter, and a forefather of such rhythm and blues (R&B) producers as Ralph Bass. Ruth had organized the Selah Jubilee Singers, a gospel group drawn from the membership of a church choir, leaving it in 1949 to pursue more secular interests in music.

Ruth was a deejay on WOV, a radio station in New York City, at a time in the late 1940s when gospel groups such as Sister Rosetta Tharpe, the Pilgrim Travelers and the Five Blind Boys were touring the country playing in shabby settings with few amenities for the performers. Meanwhile, rhythm and blues groups were becoming so popular that theaters such as the Apollo Theater began featuring highly successful R&B revues. Gospel groups were popular on radio stations but their performances made no money.

No one had yet conceived of combining the power of gospel with the highly charged, money-making revue format of the successful R&B acts that appealed to urban audiences. In 1955, Ruth succeeded in signing a gospel group to play in a commercial theater for the first time in the history of American entertainment. Subsequently Ruth continued to feature gospel groups as a prominent and influential deejay and promoter.

== Early life and career ==
Thermon Ruth was born in Newberry County, South Carolina, and moved as a child with his family to Brooklyn, New York in 1922.

By about 1927, while working as deejay at WOV in Brooklyn, he founded The Selah Jubilee Singers. The group later based in Raleigh, North Carolina, where they had a daily program of music on radio station WPTF. In 1949, Ruth formed a secular vocal group with fellow singers Allen Bunn, David McNeil, Hadie Rowe Jr., and Raymond "Pee Wee" Barnes. Based in New York, they became best known as The Larks, although the group also recorded under many other names including The Jubilators, The 4 Barons and The Southern Harmonaires. The group had some success on the Billboard R&B charts, their biggest hit being "Eyesight to the Blind" in 1951 on which Bunn (later known as Tarheel Slim) sang lead vocals. The original Larks split up in 1952.

== Professionalizing gospel ==
By 1950, Ruth was very aware that gospel groups had become popular acts although they usually appeared in dusty store fronts, not in thriving, jiving black theaters. The lifestyle of the gospel singers prevented them from appearing in such venues as the Apollo Theater, while the secular R&B groups were appearing there and in other urban rhythm and blues theaters, performing pulsating hit gospel songs. Ruth had the idea of convincing Frank Schiffman, then owner of the Apollo (who was dubious that a gospel act would succeed in his theater) of giving the Selah Jubilee Singers a trial performance on the Apollo stage.

A more difficult task for Ruth was to convince the Selah Jubilee Singers that playing at the Apollo was not sinful. At that time, gospel music was considered sacred music and not to be performed as secular entertainment. Ruth convinced the group by arguing that, since the Apollo was a sinful den of iniquity, that was exactly where a gospel group should sing. There they could bring the sacred message to the sinners, and that the building itself should not matter if their performance of gospel was to worship God . Further, not only would they have a real stage with professional stage lighting and great musical acoustics, for the first time they would be guaranteed to be paid a remuneration whether the show was a success nor not.

On December 15, 1955, the Selah Jubilee Singers debuted at the Apollo, the first gospel group to play there or at any commercial theater. Thurman ensured that a variety of gospel was featured in order to broaden the appeal: gospel, jubilee, and spirituals but with an emphasis on rhythm as well as the emotional components of gospel. The shows were stimulating, exciting and a great success with the Apollo regulars. Dionne Warwick remembers that the audience became overwhelmed with emotion. "We were entertainers," remembers Ruth. Gospel acts became commercial hits. The Selah Jubilee Singers became a professional R&B group, the Larks, in the 1950s.

Ruth also taught the gospel groups to abide by theatrical rules, such as keeping firm to time limits on stage, as they were used to singing as long as the spirit hit them in the storefronts. Having to pay stage hands overtime was a major motivation in convincing the gospel groups to confine their performances to the time allotted to them. They also learned to keep theatrical schedules, performing their act whether the spirit hit them or not.

== Popular gospel ==
Ruth organized the first of many Gospel Caravans, a professional package tour of gospel acts modeled after the popular R&B revues that traveled the country's entertainment circuit. This was the beginning of the popularity of the touring gospel groups have become part of the American music scene.

Thurman Ruth was inducted into the Gospel Music Hall of Fame.
