= Apollo Records (1944) =

American record company and label

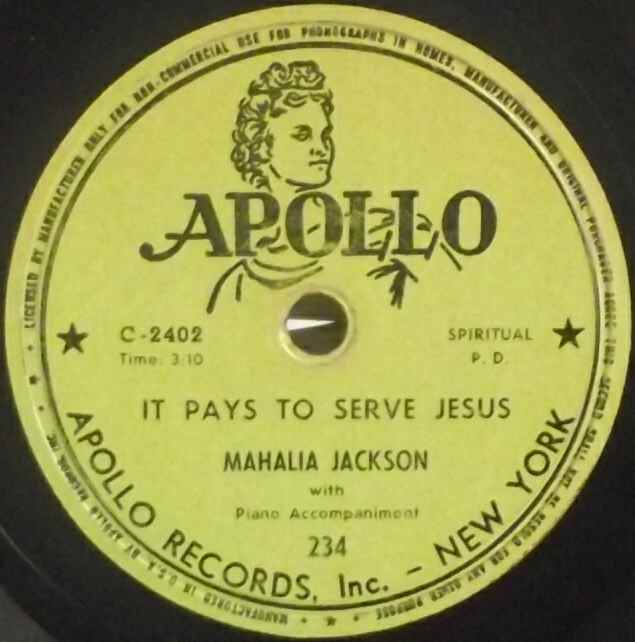
- Founded: 1944
- Founder: Hy Siegel; Ted Gottlieb
- Defunct: 1962
- Status: Inactive
- Genre: Various
- Country of origin: U.S.
- Location: New York City

Apollo Records was a record company and label founded in New York City by Hy Siegel and Ted Gottlieb in 1944. A year later it was sold to Ike and Bess Berman. Apollo was known for blues (Doc Pomus), doo-wop (The Larks), gospel (Mahalia Jackson), jazz, and rock and roll.

== Early years ==
In the early 1940s, the Bermans and Siegel worked at the Rainbow Record Shop on 125th Street in Harlem. They named the label after the nearby Apollo Theater. Siegel served as Apollo's first president. Initially Apollo employed three product lines that included a 300 series, featuring rhythm and blues and jazz artists, and a 100 series which was a variety of genres: gospel, calypso, Country music and Jewish comedy. By issue #188, the 100 series shifted exclusively towards gospel. The third line, starting at #750, was dubbed "Jazz Masterworks". Apollo recorded rhythm and blues singers Dinah Washington and Wynonie Harris before they became famous on other labels.

Dean Martin recorded briefly for the label in 1947.

In 1946, the Bermans signed Mahalia Jackson. Although she was regarded as "The Queen of Gospel", she hadn't recorded much. When Jackson's Move On Up a Little Higher was released in January 1948, it was a hit. Overtime shifts were added to keep up with demand for the record. At an Apollo board meeting on May 27, 1948, Siegel stepped down and Bess Berman became president. Berman was among few women executives in the 78 era. Ike Berman ran the pressing plant that manufactured Apollo Records.

== Gospel ==
During its peak years from 1948 to 1952, Apollo concentrated on gospel music. Mahalia Jackson was Apollo's biggest seller and the artist they recorded most. Apollo also issued recordings by the Roberta Martin Singers, The Dixie Hummingbirds, The Robert Anderson Singers, The Professor Alex Bradford Singers, Harold Ivory Williams and the Ivory Gospel Singers, Rev. B. C. Campbell and his Congregation, The Daniels Singers, and The Two Gospel Keys. Rev. James Cleveland made some of his first recordings with Apollo in The Gospelaires and in The Gospel All-Stars, a session he led and arranged.

== Doo-wop ==
Bess Berman took note of the popularity of African American vocal groups named after birds, such as The Orioles and The Ravens. She re-christened the Selah Jubilee Singers as The Larks and began to record them in popular material. The Larks hit number five on the R&B chart with "Eyesight to the Blind" in 1951, but the group split up in 1952. Berman renamed the Royal Sons Quintet The "5" Royales, and their success exceeded that of The Larks'. In 1954, Apollo established a division called Lloyd's Records that was dedicated to doo-wop, adding a new version of The Larks organized under their only remaining member, Gene Mumford.

== Decline ==
In 1953, Hy Siegel left to form his own company, Timely Records. In 1954, Mahalia Jackson went to Columbia Records. The "5" Royales went to King Records. Hill & Range announced they were suing Berman, Apollo, and Lloyd's for infringement, citing 20 records where copyrighted songs by Thomas A. Dorsey and others were issued on Berman's labels and credited to Berman and Mahalia Jackson. Jackson wrote a letter denying knowledge of any such arrangement.

The second version of The Larks failed to chart, and in 1955 the group broke up. During the following year, Apollo ceased production of 78 rpm records and its gospel recording program, concentrating on 45s for the pop market. Apollo produced many singles in this period by groups such as the Opals, the Romeos, the Gentlemen and the Casanovas, but few of these records made money. The last popular record was "The Fire Burns No More" by the Chesters in 1957. "Handy Man" was first recorded for Apollo in 1959 by the Sparks of Rhythm but did not become a hit until lead singer Jimmy Jones recorded it for Cub Records in 1960. By that time, Apollo had stopped making recordings and was concentrating on reissues, even in the 45 market. After the Chesters renamed themselves Little Anthony and the Imperials and became stars for another record company, their Apollo releases reappeared under the name Little Anthony. In later years Solomon Burke was featured on several singles and an LP.

== LPs and after ==
Apollo Records released only one or two LPs every year, starting in 1954, and these were usually reissues. It never issued a stereo recording. One of Apollo's last releases from 1962 was Mahalia Jackson's Apollo Records Requests the Honor of Your Presence at the Command Performance of Mahalia Jackson, Re-Creating Her European Concert Tour. The album consisted of recordings made for Apollo in the 1940s and early 1950s. It was packaged to look like a live recording from Jackson's 1961 tour, and to compete with the Columbia Records album Mahalia Jackson Recorded in Europe During Her Latest Concert Tour.

Apollo Records closed in 1962. Over the next decade, Kenwood Records reissued most of Apollo's albums and added a few more compilations. Kenwood released a memorial album when Mahalia Jackson died in 1972. While the owner or partner in the Kenwood concern is not known, it is assumed that Bess Berman was the likely party behind this label.

Although the Apollo records catalog has seen few releases in the digital era, several doo-wop compilations have been released through Relic Records since the 1980s. Some of Apollo's jazz has appeared on Delmark Records. Bess Berman died in 1997. Cash Box said in 1954 that Berman "was the only woman ever to break through with outstanding success in the male-dominated recording industry."

Apollo Records and its affiliated publishing company, Bess Music, was purchased by George Hocutt on May 4, 1989. Shortly after that purchase in January 1990, Hocutt sold fifty percent of his interest to Couch and Madison Partners of the Malaco Music Group located in Jackson, Mississippi.

The Apollo Records Collection, which contains the label's master acetate disc sound recordings, resides at the University of North Carolina at Chapel Hill within the Southern Folklife Collection.

== See also ==
- List of record labels
- Apollo Records
- Solomon Burke
- James Cleveland

== Bibliography ==
- Broven, John. Record Makers and Breakers: Voices of the Independent Rock n' Roll Pioneers, University of Illinois Press, 2009
- Komara, Edward, ed. Encyclopedia of the Blues, Routledge, 2006
- Zolten, J. Jerome. Great God A'Mighty! The Dixie Hummingbirds: Celebrating the Rise of Soul Gospel Music, Oxford University Press, US 2003
