= Mahalia Jackson =

American gospel singer (1911–1972)

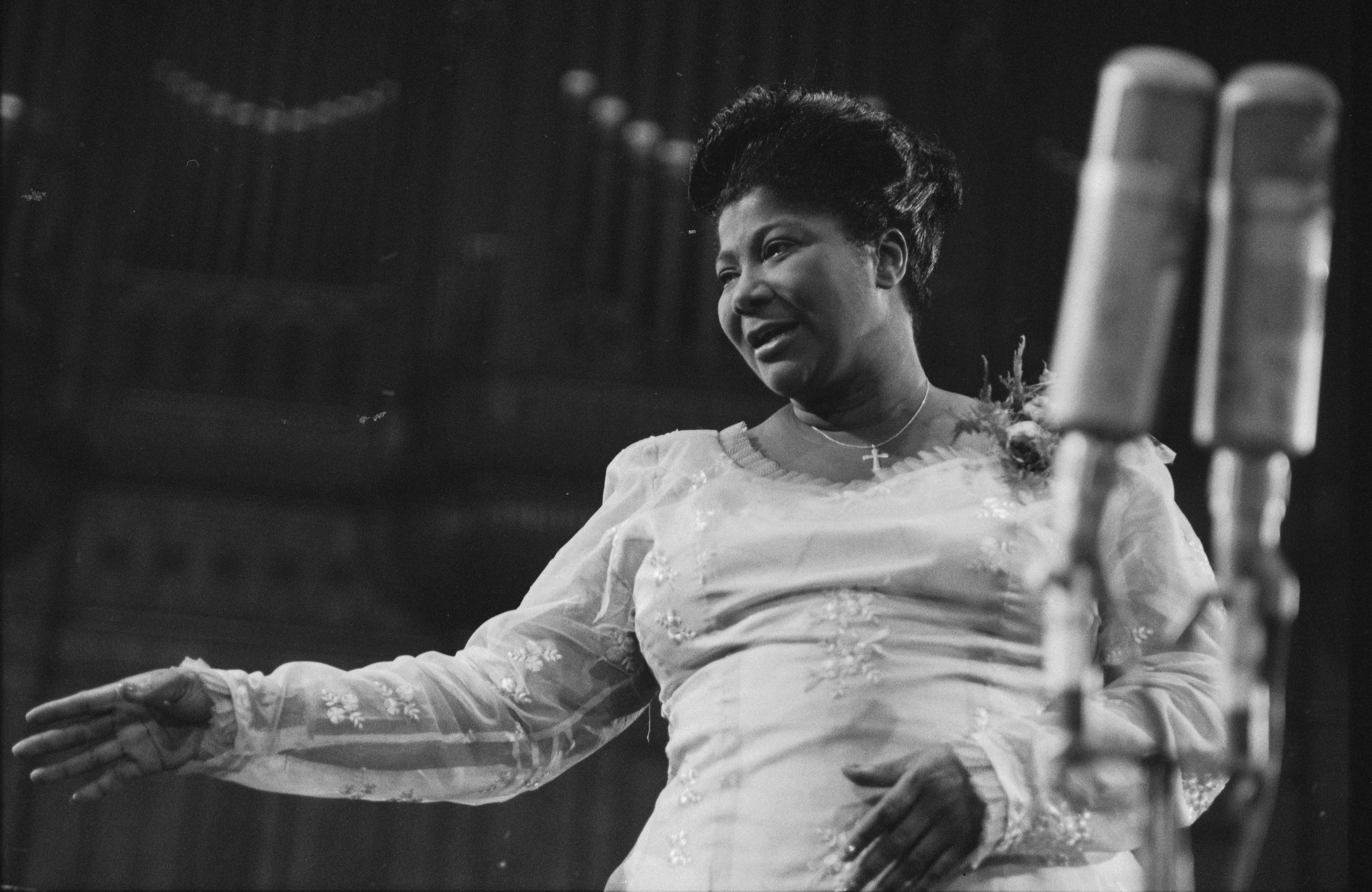
- Jackson in concert in Zürich, 1961

Background information
- Born: Mahala Jackson; October 26, 1911; New Orleans, Louisiana, U.S.
- Died: January 27, 1972 (aged 60) Evergreen Park, Illinois, U.S.
- Genres: Gospel
- Occupation: Singer
- Instrument: Vocals
- Works: Mahalia Jackson discography
- Years active: c. 1928–1971
- Labels: Decca; Apollo; Columbia

Mahalia Jackson (/məˈheɪliə/ mə-HAY-lee-ə; born Mahala Jackson; October 26, 1911 – January 27, 1972) (Note: Jackson's birth certificate states her birth year as 1911, although her aunts claim she was born in 1912; Jackson believed she was born in 1912, and was not aware of this discrepancy until she was 40 years old when she applied for her first passport. (Goreau, pp. 159–160, Burford 2019, pp. 33–64, Burford 2020, pp. 7, 11.)) was an American gospel singer, widely considered one of the most influential vocalists of the 20th century. With a career spanning 40 years, Jackson was integral to the development and spread of gospel blues in black churches throughout the U.S. During a time when racial segregation was pervasive in American society, she met considerable and unexpected success in a recording career, selling an estimated 22 million records and performing in front of integrated and secular audiences in concert halls around the world, making her one of the best-selling gospel music artists.

The granddaughter of enslaved people, Jackson was born and raised in poverty in New Orleans. She found a home in her church, leading to a lifelong dedication and singular purpose to deliver God's word through song. She moved to Chicago as an adolescent and joined the Johnson Singers, one of the earliest gospel groups. Jackson was heavily influenced by musician-composer Thomas Dorsey and blues singer Bessie Smith, adapting Smith's style to traditional Protestant hymns and contemporary songs. After making an impression in Chicago churches, she was hired to sing at funerals, political rallies, and revivals. For 15 years, she functioned as what she termed a "fish and bread singer", working odd jobs between performances to make a living.

Nationwide recognition came for Jackson in 1947 with the release of "Move On Up a Little Higher", selling two million copies and hitting the number-two spot on Billboard charts, both firsts for gospel music. Jackson's recordings captured the attention of jazz fans in the U.S. and France, and she became the first gospel recording artist to tour Europe. She regularly appeared on television and radio, and performed for many presidents and heads of state, including singing the national anthem at John F. Kennedy's Inaugural Ball in 1961. Motivated by her experiences living and touring in the South and integrating a Chicago neighborhood, she participated in the civil rights movement, singing for fundraisers and at the March on Washington for Jobs and Freedom in 1963. She was a vocal and loyal supporter of Martin Luther King Jr. and a personal friend of his family.

Throughout her career, Jackson faced intense pressure to record secular music, but she turned down high-paying opportunities to concentrate on gospel. Completely self-taught, Jackson had a keen instinct for music, her delivery marked by extensive improvisation with melody and rhythm. She was renowned for her powerful contralto voice, range, an enormous stage presence, and her ability to relate to her audiences, conveying and evoking intense emotion during performances. Passionate and at times frenetic, she wept and demonstrated physical expressions of joy while singing. Her success brought about international interest in gospel music, initiating the "Golden Age of Gospel" making it possible for many soloists and vocal groups to tour and record. Popular music as a whole felt her influence and she is credited with inspiring rhythm and blues, soul, and rock and roll singing styles. A Grammy Lifetime Achievement Award recipient, she won three competitive Grammy Awards and was inducted into the Grammy Hall of Fame, the National Recording Registry, and the Rock & Roll, Gospel, and R&B Halls of Fame, as well as the Hollywood Walk of Fame and Black Music & Entertainment Walk of Fame. She was also named one of NPR's 50 Great Voices, and ranked among Rolling Stone's 200 Greatest Singers of All Time.

== Early life (1911 – c. 1928) ==
Mahalia Jackson was born to Charity Clark and Johnny Jackson, a stevedore and weekend barber. Clark and Jackson were unmarried, a common arrangement among black women in New Orleans at the time. He lived elsewhere, never joining Charity as a parent. Both sets of Mahalia's grandparents were born into slavery, her paternal grandparents on a rice plantation and her maternal grandparents on a cotton plantation in Pointe Coupee Parish about 100 miles (160 km) north of New Orleans. (Note: Her grandfather, Reverend Paul Clark, supervised ginning and baling cotton until Emancipation, then became a sharecropper and a Baptist minister. Paul's brother Porter left the plantation at his first opportunity to be a cook aboard a steamboat traveling between the Atchafalaya River and New Orleans. One by one, Porter Clark brought Paul's daughters to New Orleans. What little Mahalia knew of her father's family included his two cousins who were traveling vaudeville performers touring with blues singer Gertrude "Ma" Rainey. (Jackson and Wylie, pp. 11–28., Goreau, pp. 3–15.)) Charity's older sister, Mahala "Duke" Paul, was her daughter's namesake, sharing the spelling without the "I". (Note: "Mahala" is derived from Mahalath, the granddaughter of King David. Jackson added the "I" to her name in 1931. (Burford, pp. 6–32, Goreau, pp. 51–61.)) Duke hosted Charity and their five other sisters and children in her leaky three-room shotgun house on Water Street in New Orleans' Sixteenth Ward. The family called Charity's daughter "Halie"; she counted as the 13th person living in Aunt Duke's house. As Charity's sisters found employment as maids and cooks, they left Duke's, though Charity remained with her daughter, Mahalia's half-brother Peter, and Duke's son Fred. Mahalia was born with bowed legs and infections in both eyes. Her eyes healed quickly but her Aunt Bell treated her legs with grease water massages with little result. For her first few years, Mahalia was nicknamed "Fishhooks" for the curvature of her legs.

The Clarks were devout Baptists attending nearby Plymouth Rock Baptist Church. Sabbath was strictly followed, the entire house shut down on Friday evenings and did not open again until Monday morning. As members of the church, they were expected to attend services, participate in activities there, and follow a code of conduct: no jazz, no card games, and no "high life": drinking or visiting bars or juke joints. Dancing was only allowed in the church when one was moved by the spirit. The adult choir at Plymouth Rock sang traditional Protestant hymns, typically written by Isaac Watts and his contemporaries. Jackson enjoyed the music sung by the congregation more. These songs would be lined out: called out from the pulpit, with the congregation singing it back. They had a stronger rhythm, accentuated with clapping and foot-tapping, which Jackson later said gave her "the bounce" that carried with her decades later. She dutifully joined the children's choir at age four. Next door to Duke's house was a small Pentecostal church that Jackson never attended but stood outside during services and listened raptly. Music here was louder and more exuberant. The congregation included "jubilees" or uptempo spirituals in their singing. Shouting and stomping were regular occurrences, unlike at her own church. Jackson later remembered, "These people had no choir or no organ. They used the drum, the cymbal, the tambourine, and the steel triangle. Everybody in there sang, and they clapped and stomped their feet, and sang with their whole bodies. They had a beat, a rhythm we held on to from slavery days, and their music was so strong and expressive. It used to bring tears to my eyes."

When Jackson was five, her mother became ill and died, the cause unknown. Aunt Duke took in Jackson and her half-brother at another house on Esther Street. Duke was severe and strict, with a notorious temper. Jackson split her time between working, usually scrubbing floors and making moss-filled mattresses and cane chairs, playing along the levees catching fish and crabs and singing with other children, and spending time at Mount Moriah Baptist Church where her grandfather sometimes preached. The full-time minister there gave sermons with a sad "singing tone" that Jackson later said would penetrate to her heart, crediting it with strongly influencing her singing style. Church became a home to Jackson where she found music and safety; she often fled there to escape her aunt's moods. She attended McDonough School 24, but was required to fill in for her various aunts if they were ill, so she rarely attended a full week of school; when she was 10, the family needed her more at home. She dropped out and began taking in laundry.

Jackson worked, and she went to church on Wednesday evenings, Friday nights, and most of the day on Sundays. Already possessing a big voice at age 12, she joined the junior choir. She was surrounded by music in New Orleans, more often blues pouring out of her neighbors' houses, although she was fascinated with second line funeral processions returning from cemeteries when the musicians played brisk jazz. Her older cousin Fred, not as intimidated by Duke, collected records of both kinds. The family had a phonograph and while Aunt Duke was at work, Jackson played records by Bessie Smith, Mamie Smith, and Ma Rainey, singing along while she scrubbed floors. Bessie Smith was Jackson's favorite and the one she most-often mimicked.

Jackson's legs began to straighten on their own when she was 14, but conflicts with Aunt Duke never abated. Whippings turned into being thrown out of the house for slights and manufactured infractions and spending many nights with one of her nearby aunts. The final confrontation caused her to move into her own rented house for a month, but she was lonely and unsure of how to support herself. After two aunts, Hannah and Alice, moved to Chicago, Jackson's family, concerned for her, urged Hannah to take her back there with her after a Thanksgiving visit. (Note: Jackson appears on the 1930 census living with Aunt Duke in New Orleans. Jackson's autobiography and an extensively detailed biography written by Laurraine Goreau place Jackson in Chicago in 1928 when she met and worked with Thomas A. Dorsey. (Burford 2019, pp. 33–64, Burford 2020, p. 8–32, Harris, p. 258, Marovich, p. 80, Jackson and Wylie, pp. 39–50, Goreau, pp. 51–61.))

== Rise of gospel music in Chicago (c. 1928 – c. 1931) ==
In a very cold December, Jackson arrived in Chicago. For a week she was miserably homesick, unable to move off the couch until Sunday when her aunts took her to Greater Salem Baptist Church, an environment she felt at home in immediately, later stating it was "the most wonderful thing that ever happened to me". When the pastor called the congregation to witness, or declare one's experience with God, Jackson was struck by the spirit and launched into a lively rendition of "Hand Me Down My Silver Trumpet, Gabriel", to an impressed but somewhat bemused audience. The power of Jackson's voice was readily apparent but the congregation was unused to such an animated delivery. She was nonetheless invited to join the 50-member choir, and a vocal group formed by the pastor's sons, Prince, Wilbur, and Robert Johnson, and Louise Lemon. They performed as a quartet, the Johnson Singers, with Prince as the pianist: Chicago's first black gospel group. Initially they hosted familiar programs singing at socials and Friday night musicals. They wrote and performed moral plays at Greater Salem with offerings going toward the church.

Jackson's arrival in Chicago occurred during the Great Migration, a massive movement of black Southerners to Northern cities. Between 1910 and 1970, hundreds of thousands of rural Southern blacks moved to Chicago, transforming a neighborhood in the South Side into Bronzeville, a black city within a city which was mostly self sufficient, prosperous, and teeming in the 1920s. This movement caused white flight with whites moving to suburbs, leaving established white churches and synagogues with dwindling members. Their mortgages were taken over by black congregations in good position to settle in Bronzeville. Members of these churches were, in Jackson's term, "society Negroes" who were well educated and eager to prove their successful assimilation into white American society. Musical services tended to be formal, presenting solemnly delivered hymns written by Isaac Watts and other European composers. Shouting and clapping were generally not allowed as they were viewed as undignified. Special programs and musicals tended to feature sophisticated choral arrangements to prove the quality of the choir.

This difference between the styles in Northern urban churches and the South was vividly illustrated when the Johnson Singers appeared at a church one evening and Jackson stood out to sing solo, scandalizing the pastor with her exuberant shouts. He accused her of blasphemy, bringing "twisting jazz" into the church. Jackson was momentarily shocked before retorting, "This is the way we sing down South!" The minister was not alone in his apprehension. She was often so involved in singing she was mostly unaware how she moved her body. To hide her movements, pastors urged her to wear loose fitting robes which she often lifted a few inches from the ground, and accused her of employing "snake hips" while dancing when the spirit moved her. Enduring another indignity, Jackson scraped together four dollars (equivalent to $75 in 2025) to pay a talented black operatic tenor for a professional assessment of her voice. She was dismayed when the professor chastised her: "You've got to learn to stop hollering. It will take time to build up your voice. The way you sing is not a credit to the Negro race. You've got to learn to sing songs so that white people can understand them."

Soon Jackson found the mentor she was seeking. Thomas A. Dorsey, a seasoned blues musician trying to transition to gospel music, trained Jackson for two months, persuading her to sing slower songs to maximize their emotional effect. Dorsey had a motive: he needed a singer to help sell his sheet music. He recruited Jackson to stand on Chicago street corners with him and sing his songs, hoping to sell them for ten cents a page. It was not the financial success Dorsey hoped for, but their collaboration resulted in the unintentional conception of gospel blues solo singing in Chicago. (Note: Dorsey helped create the first gospel choir and its characteristic sound in 1931. (Harris, pp. 180–208.))

== Fish and bread singer (c. 1931 – 1945) ==
Steadily, the Johnson Singers were asked to perform at other church services and revivals. When larger, more established black churches expressed little interest in the Johnson Singers, they were courted by smaller storefront churches and were happy to perform there, though less likely to be paid as much or at all. Newly arrived migrants attended these storefront churches; the services were less formal and reminiscent of what they had left behind. Jackson found an eager audience in new arrivals, one calling her "a fresh wind from the down-home religion." Black Chicago was hit hard by the Great Depression, driving church attendance throughout the city, which Jackson credited with starting her career. Gradually and by necessity, larger churches became more open to Jackson's singing style. As many of them were suddenly unable to meet their mortgage notes, adapting their musical programs became a viable way to attract and keep new members.

When she first arrived in Chicago, Jackson dreamed of being a nurse or a teacher, but before she could enroll in school she had to take over Aunt Hannah's job when she became ill. Jackson became a laundress and took a series of domestic and factory jobs while the Johnson Singers began to make a meager living, earning from $1.50 to $8 (equivalent to $29 to $154 in 2025) a night. Steady work became a second priority to singing. Jackson began calling herself a "fish and bread singer", working for herself and God. She made her first recordings in 1931, singles that she intended to sell at National Baptist Convention meetings, though she was mostly unsuccessful. (Note: These recordings have been lost.) But as her audiences grew each Sunday, she began to get hired as a soloist to sing at funerals and political rallies for Louis B. Anderson and William L. Dawson. In 1932, on Dawson's request, she sang for Franklin D. Roosevelt's presidential campaign. She had become the only professional gospel singer in Chicago. Sometimes she made $10 a week (equivalent to $236 in 2025) in what historian Michael Harris calls "an almost unheard-of professionalization of one's sacred calling".

As opportunities came to her, an extraordinary moral code directed Jackson's career choices. Her lone vice was frequenting movie and vaudeville theaters until her grandfather visited one summer and had a stroke while standing in the sun on a Chicago street. Jackson pleaded with God to spare him, swearing she would never go to a theater again. He survived and Jackson kept her promise, refusing to attend as a patron and rejecting opportunities to sing in theaters for her entire career. She furthermore vowed to sing gospel exclusively despite intense pressure. In 1935, Jackson met Isaac "Ike" Hockenhull, a chemist working as a postman during the Depression. Impressed with his attention and manners, Jackson married him after a year-long courtship. Hockenhull's mother gave the couple 200 formulas for homemade hair and skincare products she had sold door to door. Hockenhull and Jackson made cosmetics in their kitchen and she sold jars when she traveled. It was not steady work, and the cosmetics did not sell well. At one point Hockenhull had been laid off and he and Jackson had less than a dollar between them. He saw that auditions for The Swing Mikado, a jazz-flavored retelling of the Gilbert and Sullivan opera, were taking place. He demanded she go; the role would pay $60 a week (equivalent to $1,392 in 2025). Plus, he saw no value in singing gospel. He did not consider it artful. He had repeatedly urged her to get formal training and put her voice to better use. She refused and they argued about it often. Wracked by guilt, she attended the audition, later calling the experience "miserable" and "painful". When she got home she learned that the role was offered to her, but when Hockenhull informed her he also secured a job she immediately rejected the role to his disbelief. She furthermore turned down Louis Armstrong and Earl "Fatha" Hines when they offered her jobs singing with their bands.

In 1937, Jackson met Mayo "Ink" Williams, a music producer who arranged a session with Decca Records. She recorded four singles: "God's Gonna Separate the Wheat From the Tares", "You Sing On, My Singer", "God Shall Wipe Away All Tears", and "Keep Me Every Day". Jackson told neither her husband or Aunt Hannah, who shared her house, of this session. The records' sales were weak, but were distributed to jukeboxes in New Orleans, one of which Jackson's entire family huddled around in a bar, listening to her again and again. Decca said they would record her further if she sang blues, and once more Jackson refused.

The Johnson Singers folded in 1938, but as the Depression lightened Jackson saved some money, earned a beautician's license from Madam C. J. Walker's school, and bought a beauty salon in the heart of Bronzeville. It was almost immediately successful and the center of gospel activity. Singers, male and female, visited while Jackson cooked for large groups of friends and customers on a two-burner stove in the rear of the salon. It was located across the street from Pilgrim Baptist Church, where Thomas Dorsey had become music director. Dorsey proposed a series of performances to promote his music and her voice and she agreed. They toured off and on until 1951. It was regular and, they felt, necessary work. Dorsey accompanied Jackson on piano, often writing songs specifically for her. His background as a blues player gave him extensive experience improvising and he encouraged Jackson to develop her skills during their performances by handing her lyrics and playing chords while she created melodies, sometimes performing 20 or more songs this way. She was able to emote and relate to audiences profoundly well; her goal was to "wreck" a church, or cause a state of spiritual pandemonium among the audience which she did consistently. At one event, in an ecstatic moment Dorsey jumped up from the piano and proclaimed, "Mahalia Jackson is the Empress of gospel singers! She's the Empress! The Empress!!"

A constant worker and a shrewd businesswoman, Jackson became the choir director at St. Luke Baptist Church. She bought a building as a landlord, then found the salon so successful she had to hire help to care for it when she traveled on weekends. On tour, she counted heads and tickets to ensure she was being paid fairly. (Note: Jackson was arrested twice, in 1949 and 1952, in disputes with promoters when she felt she was not being given her contractually obligated payments. The first instance Jackson was released without penalty, but the second time she was ordered to pay the court – taking place in the back of a hardware store – $1,000 (equivalent to $12,000 in 2025). (Goreau, pp. 113–123, 152–158.)) What she was able to earn and save was done in spite of Hockenhull. A compulsive gambler, he took home a large payout asking Jackson to hide it so he would not gamble it. She laid the stash in flat bills under a rug assuming he would never look there, then went to a weekend performance in Detroit. When she returned, she realized he had found it and used it to buy a race horse. In 1943, he brought home a new Buick for her that he promptly stopped paying for. She paid for it entirely, then learned he had used it as collateral for a loan when she saw it being repossessed in the middle of the day on the busiest street in Bronzeville. They divorced amicably.

== Apollo Records and national recognition (1946–1953) ==
Each engagement Jackson took was farther from Chicago in a nonstop string of performances. In 1946 she appeared at the Golden Gate Ballroom in Harlem. In attendance was Art Freeman, a music scout for Apollo Records, a company catering to black artists and audiences concentrating mostly on jazz and blues. Apollo's chief executive Bess Berman was looking to broaden their representation to other genres, including gospel. Berman signed Jackson to a four-record session, allowing Jackson to pick the songs. Her first release on Apollo, "Wait 'til My Change Comes" backed with "I'm Going to Tell God All About it One of These Days" did not sell well. Neither did her second, "I Want to Rest" with "He Knows My Heart". Berman asked Jackson to record blues and she refused. Berman told Freeman to release Jackson from any more recordings but Freeman asked for one more session to record the song Jackson sang as a warmup at the Golden Gate Ballroom concert. "Move On Up a Little Higher" was recorded in two parts, one for each side of the 78 rpm record.

Meanwhile, Chicago radio host Louis "Studs" Terkel heard Jackson's records in a music shop and was transfixed. He bought and played them repeatedly on his show. Terkel introduced his mostly white listeners to gospel music and Jackson herself, interviewing her and asking her to sing live. "Move On Up a Little Higher" was released in 1947, selling 50,000 copies in Chicago and two million nationwide. It landed at the number two spot on the Billboard charts for two weeks, another first for gospel music. The best any gospel artist could expect to sell was 100,000. Berman set Jackson up for another recording session, where she sang "Even Me" (one million sold), and "Dig a Little Deeper" (just under one million sold). Instantly Jackson was in high demand. A position as the official soloist of the National Baptist Convention was created for her, and her audiences multiplied to the tens of thousands. She participated in the Harry S. Truman 1948 presidential campaign, earning her first invitation to the White House. Time constraints forced her to give up the choir director position at St. Luke Baptist Church and sell the beauty shop. True to her own rule, she turned down lucrative appearances in New York City at the Apollo Theater and Village Vanguard, where she was promised $5,000 a week (equivalent to $70,000 in 2025).

The next year promoter Joe Bostic approached her to perform in a gospel music revue at Carnegie Hall, a venue most often reserved for classical and well established artists such as Benny Goodman and Duke Ellington. Jackson was intimidated by this offer and dreaded the approaching date. Gospel had never been performed at Carnegie. Jackson was the final artist to appear that evening. After a shaky start, she gave multiple encores and received voluminous praise: Nora Holt, a music critic with the black newspaper The New York Amsterdam News, wrote that Jackson's rendition of "City Called Heaven" was filled with "suffering ecstasy" and that Jackson was a "genius unspoiled". John Hammond, critic at the Daily Compass, praised Jackson's powerful voice which "she used ... with reckless abandon". The revue was so successful it was made an annual event with Jackson headlining for years. The show that took place in 1951 broke attendance records set by Goodman and Arturo Toscanini.

By chance, a French jazz fan named Hugues Panassié visited the Apollo Records office in New York and discovered Jackson's music in the waiting room. He bought her records, took them home and played them on French public radio. The Académie Charles Cros awarded Jackson their Grand Prix du Disque for "I Can Put My Trust in Jesus"; Jackson was the first gospel singer to receive this award. During the same time, Jackson and blues guitarist John Lee Hooker were invited to a ten-day symposium hosted by jazz historian Marshall Stearns who gathered participants to discuss how to define jazz. Jackson was accompanied by her pianist Mildred Falls, together performing 21 songs with question and answer sessions from the audience, mostly filled with writers and intellectuals. As Jackson's singing was often considered jazz or blues with religious lyrics, she fielded questions about the nature of gospel blues and how she developed her singing style. Toward the end, a participant asked Jackson what parts of gospel music come from jazz, and she replied, "Baby, don't you know the Devil stole the beat from the Lord?" Those in the audience wrote about Jackson in several publications. Her records were sent to the UK, traded there among jazz fans, earning Jackson a cult following on both sides of the Atlantic, and she was invited to tour Europe.

Jackson had her first television appearance on Toast of the Town with Ed Sullivan in 1952. As she prepared to embark on her first tour of Europe, she began having difficulty breathing during and after performances and had severe abdominal cramping. She continued with her plans for the tour where she was very warmly received. In jazz magazine DownBeat, Mason Sargent called the tour "one of the most remarkable, in terms of audience reaction, ever undertaken by an American artist". Her appearance at the Royal Albert Hall in London made her the first gospel singer to perform there since the Fisk Jubilee Singers in 1872, and she pre-sold 20,000 copies of "Silent Night" in Copenhagen. She played numerous shows while in pain, sometimes collapsing backstage. She lost a significant amount of weight during the tour, finally having to cancel. When she returned to the U.S., she had a hysterectomy and doctors found numerous granulomas in her abdomen. She was diagnosed with sarcoidosis, a systemic inflammatory disease caused by immune cells forming lumps in organs throughout the body. Sarcoidosis is not curable, though it can be treated, and following the surgery, Jackson's doctors were cautiously optimistic that with treatment she could carry on as normal.

== Columbia Records and civil rights activism (1954–1963) ==
In 1954, Jackson learned that Berman had been withholding royalties and had allowed her contract with Apollo to expire. Mitch Miller offered her a $50,000-a-year (equivalent to $600,000 in 2025) four-year contract, and Jackson became the first gospel artist to sign with Columbia Records, a much larger company with the ability to promote her nationally. Miller attempted to make her repertoire more appealing to white listeners, asking her to record ballads and classical songs, but again she refused. "Rusty Old Halo" became her first Columbia single, and DownBeat declared Jackson "the greatest spiritual singer now alive". Columbia worked with a local radio affiliate in Chicago to create a half-hour radio program, The Mahalia Jackson Show. Although it got an overwhelmingly positive reception and producers were eager to syndicate it nationally, it was cut to ten minutes long, then canceled. She appeared on a local television program, also titled The Mahalia Jackson Show, which again got a positive reception but was canceled for lack of sponsors. Despite white people beginning to attend her shows and sending fan letters, executives at CBS were concerned they would lose advertisers from Southern states that objected to a program with a Black person as the primary focus.

If they're Christians, how in the world can they object to me singing hymns? How in the world can they take offense to that? In the name of the Lord, what kind of people could feel that way?

— Mahalia Jackson

Jackson attracted the attention of the William Morris Agency, a firm that promoted her by booking her in large concert halls and television appearances with Arthur Godfrey, Dinah Shore, Bing Crosby, and Perry Como in the 1950s. Her reverence and upbeat, positive demeanor made her desirable to progressive producers and hosts eager to feature a Black person on television. She appeared at the 1956 Democratic National Convention, silencing a rowdy hall of attendees with "I See God". Miller, who was in attendance, was awed by it, noting "there wasn't a dry eye in the house when she got through". Jackson broke into films playing a missionary in St. Louis Blues (1958), and a funeral singer in Imitation of Life (1959). As demand for her rose, she traveled extensively, performing 200 dates a year for ten years. She and her entourage of singers and accompanists toured deeper into the South, encountering difficulty finding safe, clean places to sleep, eat, and buy gas due to Jim Crow laws. Sometimes they had to sleep in Jackson's car, a Cadillac that she had purchased to make long trips more comfortable. Jackson remembered, "The looks of anger at the sight of us colored folks sitting in a nice car were frightening to see... It got so we were living on bags of fresh fruit during the day and driving half the night, and I was so exhausted by the time I was supposed to sing, I was almost dizzy." Jackson began to gain weight. She also developed peculiar habits regarding money. As a Black woman, Jackson found it often impossible to cash checks when away from Chicago. Her contracts therefore demanded she be paid in cash, often forcing her to carry tens of thousands of dollars in suitcases and in her undergarments.

Each event in her career and personal life broke another racial barrier. She often asked ushers to allow white and Black people to sit together, sometimes asking the audiences to integrate themselves by telling them that they were all Christian brothers and sisters. After years of receiving complaints about being loud when she practiced in her apartment, even in the building she owned, Jackson bought a house in the all-white Chatham Village neighborhood of Chicago. When this news spread, she began receiving death threats. The day she moved in her front window was shot. Jackson asked Richard Daley, the mayor of Chicago, for help and Daley ordered police presence outside her house for a year. A few months later, Jackson appeared live on the television special Wide Wide World singing Christmas carols from Mount Moriah, her childhood church in New Orleans. The broadcast earned excellent reviews, and Jackson received congratulatory telegrams from across the nation. Yet the next day she was unable to get a taxi or shop along Canal Street. (Note: All the white families in Chatham Village moved out within two years. (Goreau, pp. 248–256.))

While attending the National Baptist Convention in 1956, Jackson met Martin Luther King Jr. and Ralph Abernathy, both ministers emerging as organizers protesting segregation. Jackson often sang to support worthy causes for no charge, such as raising money to buy a church an organ, robes for choirs, or sponsoring missionaries. She extended this to civil rights causes, becoming the most prominent gospel musician associated with King and the civil rights movement. She raised money for the United Negro College Fund and sang at the Prayer Pilgrimage Breakfast in 1957. She later stated she felt God had especially prepared King "with the education and the warmth of spirit to do His work". Motivated by her sincere appreciation that civil rights protests were being organized within churches and its participants inspired by hymns, she traveled to Montgomery, Alabama, to sing in support of the ongoing bus boycott. She and Mildred Falls stayed at Abernathy's house in a room that was bombed four months later. After hearing that Black children in Virginia were unable to attend school because of integration conflicts, she threw them an ice cream party from Chicago, singing to them over a telephone line attached to a public address system. She similarly supported a group of Black sharecroppers in Tennessee facing eviction for voting.

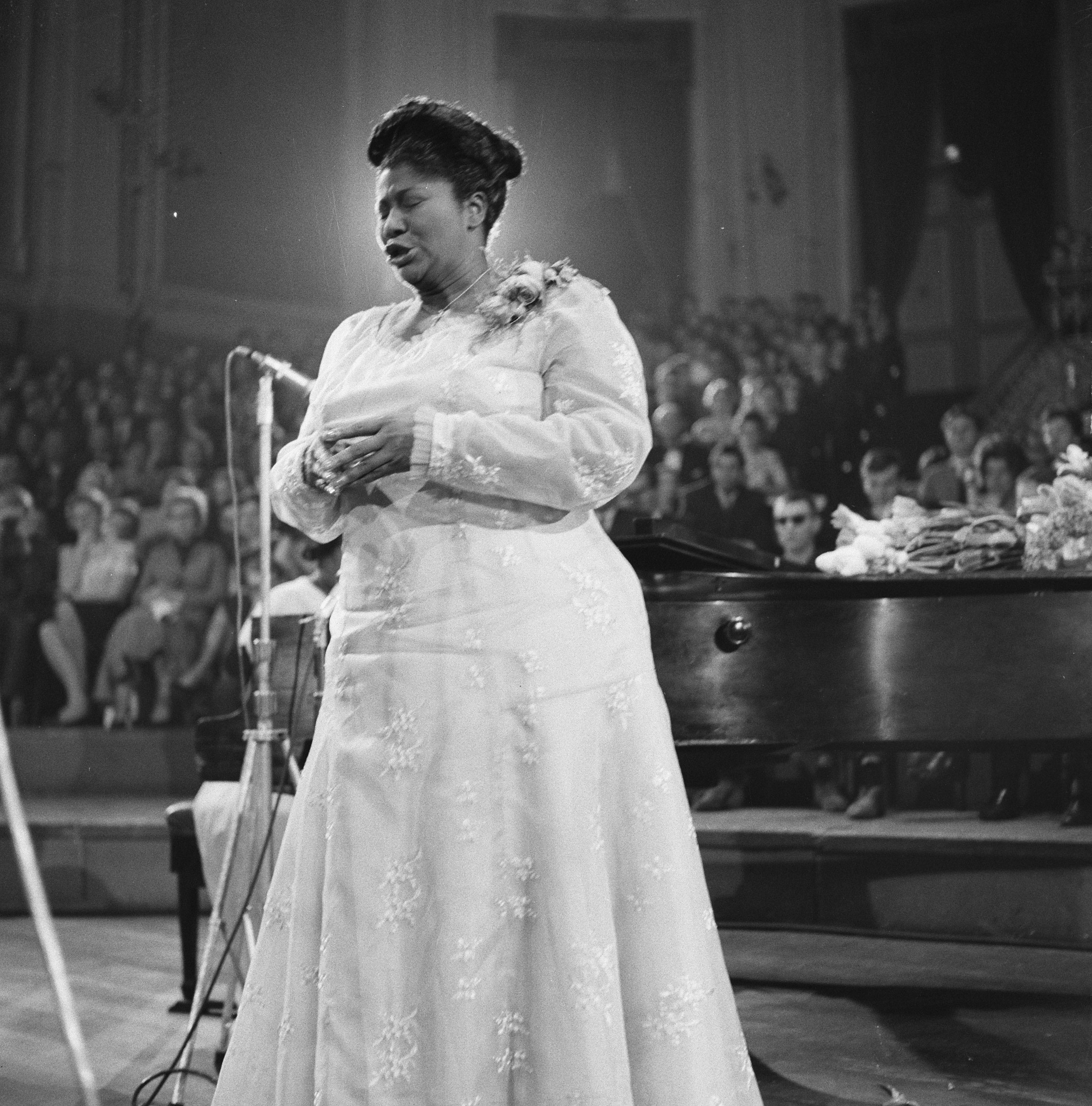
Jackson in the Concertgebouw, Amsterdam, April 1961

As gospel music became more popular – primarily due to her influence – singers began appearing at non-religious venues as a way to spread a Christian message to nonbelievers. Jackson appeared at the Newport Jazz Festival in 1957 and 1958, and in the latter's concert film, Jazz on a Summer's Day (1959). Her continued television appearances with Steve Allen, Red Skelton, Milton Berle, and Jimmy Durante kept her in high demand. She toured Europe again in 1961 with incredible success, mobbed in several cities and needing police escorts. All dates in Germany were sold out weeks in advance. In Essen, she was called to give so many encores that she eventually changed into her street clothes and the stage hands removed the microphone. Still she sang one more song. The highlight of her trip was visiting the Holy Land, where she knelt and prayed at Calvary.

When King was arrested and sentenced to four months hard labor, presidential candidate John F. Kennedy intervened, earning Jackson's loyal support. She began campaigning for him, saying: "I feel that I'm a part of this man's hopes. He lifts my spirit and makes me feel a part of the land I live in." Her clout and loyalty to Kennedy earned her an invitation to sing "The Star-Spangled Banner" at his inaugural ball in 1961. Months later, she helped raise $50,000 for the Southern Christian Leadership Conference. Jackson lent her support to King and other ministers in 1963 after their successful campaign to end segregation in Birmingham by holding a fundraising rally to pay for protestors' bail. By this time she was a personal friend of King and his wife Coretta, often hosting them when they visited Chicago, and spending Thanksgiving with their family in Atlanta. King considered Jackson's house a place that he could truly relax. She appeared at the March on Washington for Jobs and Freedom to sing "I've Been 'Buked and I've Been Scorned" on King's request, then "How I Got Over". (Note: King delivered his speech as written until a point near the end when he paused and went off text and began preaching. In the church spirit, Jackson lent her support from her seat behind him, shouting, "Tell 'em about the dream, Martin!" just before he began his most famous segment of the "I Have A Dream" speech. Branch writes that King later said he grasped at the "first run of oratory" that came to him, not knowing if Jackson's words ever reached him. (Branch, p. 2761–2763.)) Three months later, while rehearsing for an appearance on Danny Kaye's television show, Jackson was inconsolable upon learning that Kennedy had been assassinated, believing that he died fighting for the rights of African Americans.

== Later years (1964–1972) ==
Jackson toured Europe again in 1964, mobbed in several cities and proclaiming, "I thought I was the Beatles!" in Utrecht. She appeared in the film The Best Man (1964), and attended a ceremony acknowledging Lyndon Johnson's inauguration at the White House, becoming friends with Lady Bird. When at home, she attempted to remain approachable and maintain her characteristic sincerity. Mostly in secret, Jackson had paid for the education of several young people as she felt poignant regret that her own schooling was cut short. Stories of her gifts and generosity spread. Her phone number continued to be listed in the Chicago public telephone book, and she received calls nonstop from friends, family, business associates, and strangers asking for money, advice on how to break into the music industry, or general life decisions they should make. Her house had a steady flow of traffic that she welcomed. Jackson had thoroughly enjoyed cooking since childhood, and took great pleasure in feeding all of her visitors, some of them staying days or weeks on her request. (Note: Louis Armstrong and Duke Ellington praised Jackson's cooking. (Goreau, pp. 83–96, 189.))

Through friends, Jackson met Sigmond Galloway, a former musician in the construction business living in Gary, Indiana. Despite Jackson's hectic schedule and the constant companions she had in her entourage of musicians, friends, and family, she expressed loneliness and began courting Galloway when she had free time. As a complete surprise to her closest friends and associates, Jackson married him in her living room in 1964. Only a few weeks later, while driving home from a concert in St. Louis, she found herself unable to stop coughing. She checked herself into a hospital in Chicago. Since the cancellation of her tour to Europe in 1952, Jackson experienced occasional bouts of fatigue and shortness of breath. As her schedule became fuller and more demands were placed on her, these episodes became more frequent. This time, the publicly disclosed diagnosis was heart strain and exhaustion, but in private Jackson's doctors told her that she had had a heart attack and sarcoidosis was now in her heart.

Jackson's recovery took a full year, during which she was unable to tour or record, ultimately losing 50 pounds (23 kg). From this point on she was plagued with near-constant fatigue, bouts of tachycardia, and high blood pressure as her condition advanced. Jackson was often depressed and frustrated at her own fragility, but she took the time to send Lyndon Johnson a telegram urging him to protect marchers in Selma, Alabama, when she saw news coverage of Bloody Sunday. Galloway proved to be unreliable, leaving for long periods during Jackson's convalescence, then upon his return insisting she was imagining her symptoms. He tried taking over managerial duties from agents and promoters despite being inept. They argued over money; Galloway attempted to strike Jackson on two different occasions, the second one thwarted when Jackson ducked and he broke his hand hitting a piece of furniture behind her. The marriage dissolved and she announced her intention to divorce. He responded by requesting a jury trial, rare for divorces, in an attempt to embarrass her by publicizing the details of their marital problems. When Galloway's infidelities were proven in testimony, the judge declined to award him any of Jackson's assets or properties.

Her doctors cleared her to work and Jackson began recording and performing again, pushing her limitations by giving two- and three-hour concerts. She performed exceptionally well belying her personal woes and ongoing health problems. When not on tour, she concentrated her efforts on building two philanthropies: the Mahalia Jackson Foundation which eventually paid tuition for 50 college students, and the culmination of a dream she had for ten years: a nondenominational temple for young people in Chicago to learn gospel music. As she organized two large benefit concerts for these causes, she was once more heartbroken upon learning of the assassination of Martin Luther King Jr. She attended the funeral in Atlanta where she gave one of her most memorable performances of "Take My Hand, Precious Lord". With this, Jackson retired from political work and personal endorsements.

Branching out into business, Jackson partnered with comedian Minnie Pearl in a chain of restaurants called Mahalia Jackson's Chicken Dinners and lent her name to a line of canned foods. She purchased a lavish condominium in Chicago overlooking Lake Michigan and set up room for Galloway, whom she was considering remarrying. At 58 years old, she returned to New Orleans, finally allowed to stay as a guest in the upscale Royal Orleans hotel, receiving red carpet treatment. She embarked on a tour of Europe in 1968, which she cut short for health reasons, but she returned in 1969 to adoring audiences. Now experiencing inflammation in her eyes and painful cramps in her legs and hands, she undertook successful tours of the Caribbean, still counting the house to ensure she was being paid fairly, and Liberia in West Africa. In 1971, Jackson made television appearances with Johnny Cash and Flip Wilson. For three weeks she toured Japan, becoming the first Western singer since the end of World War II to give a private concert for the Imperial Family. The U.S. State Department sponsored a visit to India, where she played Kolkata, New Delhi, Madras, and Mumbai, all of them sold out within two hours. In New Delhi, she had an unexpected audience with Prime Minister Indira Gandhi who declared, "I will never hear a greater voice; I will never know a greater person." While touring Europe months later, Jackson became ill in Germany and flew home to Chicago where she was hospitalized. In January 1972, she received surgery to remove a bowel obstruction and died in recovery.

Although news outlets had reported on her health problems and concert postponements for years, her death came as a shock to many of her fans. She received a funeral service at Greater Salem Baptist Church in Chicago where she was still a member. Fifty thousand people paid their respects, many of them lining up in the snow the night before, and her peers in gospel singing performed in her memory the next morning. The day after, Mayor Richard Daley and other politicians and celebrities gave their eulogies at the Arie Crown Theater with 6,000 in attendance. Her body was returned to New Orleans where she lay in state at Rivergate Auditorium under a military and police guard, and 60,000 people viewed her casket. On the way to Providence Memorial Park in Metairie, Louisiana, the funeral procession passed Mount Moriah Baptist Church, where her music was played over loudspeakers.

== Style ==
=== Singing ===
[Jackson would] sometimes build a song up and up, singing the words over and over to increase their intensity... Like Bessie, she would slide up or slur down to a note. She would also break up a word into as many syllables as she cared to, or repeat and prolong an ending to make it more effective: "His love is deeper and deeper, yes deeper and deeper, it's deeper! and deeper, Lord! deeper and deeper, Lord! it's deeper than the se-e-e-e-a, yeah, oh my lordy, yeah deeper than the sea, Lord." And the last two words would be a dozen syllables each.

— Author Hettie Jones

Though the gospel blues style Jackson employed was common among soloists in Black churches, to many white jazz fans it was novel. As she was the most prominent — and sometimes the only gospel singer many white listeners knew — she often received requests to define the style and explain how and why she sang as she did. Jackson was mostly untrained, never learning to read or write musical notation, so her style was heavily marked by instinct. She answered questions to the best of her ability though often responded with lack of surety, saying: "All I ever learned was just to sing the way I feel... off-beat, on the beat, between beats — however the Lord lets it come out." When pressed for clearer descriptions, she replied: "Child, I don't know how I do it myself."

Jackson's voice is noted for being energetic and powerful, ranging from contralto to soprano, which she switched between rapidly. She resisted labeling her voice range instead calling it "real strong and clear". She used bent or "worried" notes typical of blues, the sound of which jazz aficionado Bucklin Moon described as "an almost solid wall of blue tonality". She moaned, hummed, and improvised extensively with rhythm and melody, often embellishing notes with a prodigious use of melisma, or singing several tones per syllable. Author Anthony Heilbut called it a "weird ethereal sound, part moan, part failed operatics". Gospel historian Horace Boyer attributes Jackson's "aggressive style and rhythmic ascension" to the Pentecostal congregation she heard as a child, saying Jackson was "never a Baptist singer". He continues: "bending a note here, chopping off a note there, singing through rest spots and ornamenting the melodic line at will, [Jackson] confused pianists but fascinated those who played by ear". Bucklin Moon was enamored with her singing, writing that the embellishments Jackson added "take your breath away. As a member of a Sanctified Church in Mount Vernon once told me: 'Mahalia, she add more flowers and feathers than anybody, and they all is exactly right.' She breaks every rule of concert singing, taking breaths in the middle of a word and sometimes garbling the words altogether, but the full-throated feeling and expression are seraphic." Writer Ralph Ellison noted how she blended precise diction with a thick New Orleans accent, describing the effect as "almost of the academy one instant, and of the broadest cotton field dialect the next".

By her own admission and in the opinion of multiple critics and scholars, Bessie Smith's singing style was clearly dominant in Jackson's voice. In Melody Maker, Max Jones contrasted the two: "Whereas Bessie's singing can sound harsh and unlovely, even to jazz students, on first acquaintance, Mahalia's voice is obviously an instrument of uncommon beauty... Her bursts of power and sudden rhythmic drives build up to a pitch that leave you unprepared to listen afterwards to any but the greatest of musicians." Other singers made their mark. In her early days in Chicago, Jackson saved her money to buy records by classical singers Roland Hayes, Grace Moore, and Lawrence Tibbett, attributing her diction, breathing, and she said, "what little I know of technique" to these singers.

Improvisation was a significant part of Jackson's live performances both in concert halls and churches. She often stretched what would be a five-minute recording to twenty-five minutes to achieve maximum emotional effect. In Black churches, this was a regular practice among gospel soloists who sought to evoke an emotional purging in the audience during services. White and non-Christian audiences also felt this resonance. After one concert, critic Nat Hentoff wrote: "The conviction and strength of her rendition had a strange effect on the secularists present, who were won over to Mahalia if not to her message. Most of them were amazed at the length of time after the concert, during which the sound of her voice remained active in the mind." Jackson explained that as God worked through her she became more impassioned during a song, and that what she felt was right to do in the moment was what was necessary for the audience. As her career advanced, she found it difficult to adjust to the time constraints in recording and television appearances, saying: "When I sing I don't go by the score. I lose something when I do. I don't want to be told I can sing just so long. I make it 'til that passion is passed. When I become conscious, I can't do it good."

=== Recording ===
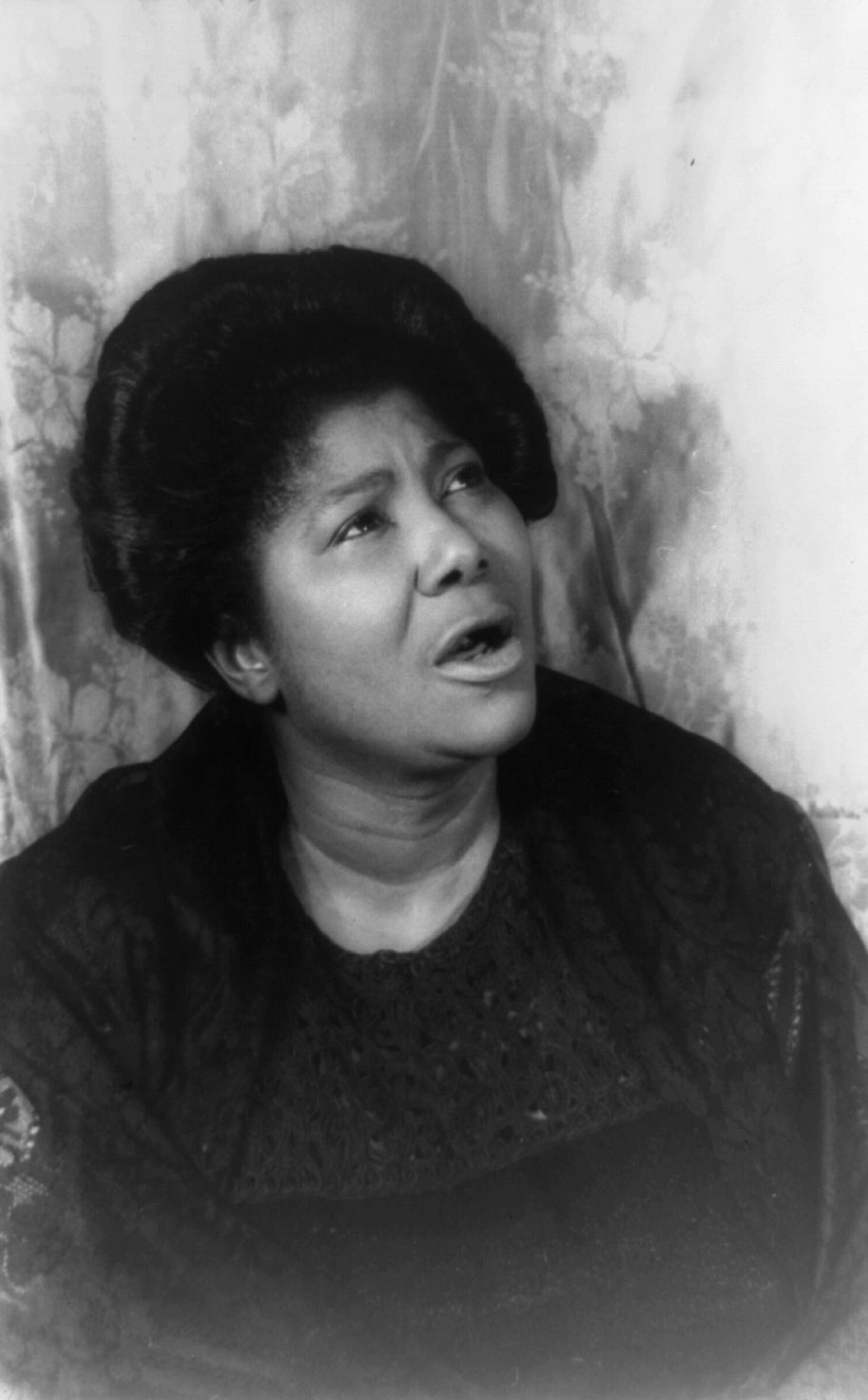
Jackson, photographed by Carl Van Vechten in 1962

Jackson estimated that she sold 22 million records in her career. Her four singles for Decca and seventy-one for Apollo are widely acclaimed by scholars as defining gospel blues. The earliest are marked by minimal accompaniment with piano and organ. Apollo added acoustic guitar, backup singers, bass, and drums in the 1950s. Her singing is lively, energetic, and emotional, using "a voice in the prime of its power and command", according to author Bob Darden. Although hearing herself on Decca recordings years later prompted Jackson to declare they are "not very good", Viv Broughton calls "Keep Me Every Day" a "gospel masterpiece", and Anthony Heilbut praises its "wonderful artless purity and conviction", saying that in her Decca records, her voice "was at its loveliest, rich and resonant, with little of the vibrato and neo-operatic obbligatos of later years". Likewise, he calls Jackson's Apollo records "uniformly brilliant", choosing "Even Me", "Just As I Am", "City Called Heaven", and "I Do, Don't You" as perfect examples of her phrasing and contralto range, having an effect that is "angelic but never saccharine". The New Grove Gospel, Blues, and Jazz cites the Apollo songs "In the Upper Room", "Let the Power of the Holy Ghost Fall on Me", and "I'm Glad Salvation is Free" as prime examples of the "majesty" of Jackson's voice. According to musicologist Wilfrid Mellers, Jackson's early recordings demonstrate a "sound that is all-embracing, as secure as the womb, from which singer and listener may be reborn. The breathtaking beauty of the voice and superbly controlled transitions from speech to prayer to song heal and anneal."

Columbia Records, then the largest recording company in the U.S., presented Jackson as the "World's Greatest Gospel Singer" in the 28 albums it released. She was marketed to appeal to a wide audience of listeners who, despite all her accomplishments up to 1954, had never heard of her. In contrast to the series of singles from Apollo, Columbia released themed albums that included liner notes and photos. Compared with other artists at Columbia, Jackson was allowed considerable input in what she would record, but Mitch Miller and producer George Avakian persuaded her with varying success to broaden her appeal to listeners of different faiths. Though her early records at Columbia had a similar sound to her Apollo records, the music accompanying Jackson at Columbia later included orchestras, electric guitars, backup singers, and drums, the overall effect of which was more closely associated with light pop music. She was marketed similarly to jazz musicians, but her music at Columbia ultimately defied categorization. Her albums interspersed familiar compositions by Thomas Dorsey and other gospel songwriters with songs considered generally inspirational. These included "You'll Never Walk Alone" written by Rodgers and Hammerstein for the 1945 musical Carousel, "Trees" based on the poem by Joyce Kilmer, "Danny Boy", and the patriotic songs "My Country 'Tis of Thee" and "The Battle Hymn of the Republic", among others. The Cambridge Companion to Blues and Gospel Music describes Jackson's Columbia recordings as "toned down and polished" compared to the rawer, more minimalist sound at Apollo. Scholar Mark Burford praises "When I Wake Up In Glory" as "one of the crowning achievements of her career as a recording artist", but Heilbut calls her Columbia recordings of "When the Saints Go Marching In" and "The Lord's Prayer", "uneventful material". Jackson agreed somewhat, acknowledging that her sound was being commercialized, calling some of these recordings "sweetened-water stuff". When the themes of her songs were outwardly religious, some critics felt the delivery was at times less lively. John Hammond, who helped secure Jackson's contract with Columbia, told her if she signed with them many of her Black fans would not relate well to the music. This turned out to be true and as a result, Jackson created a distinct performing style for Columbia recordings that was markedly different from her live performances, which remained animated and lively, both in churches and concert halls.

=== Live performance ===
She roared like a Pentecostal preacher, she moaned and growled like the old Southern mothers, she hollered the gospel blues like a sanctified Bessie Smith and she cried into the Watts' hymns like she was back in a slave cabin. They say that, in her time, Mahalia Jackson could wreck a church in minutes flat and keep it that way for hours on end."

— Author Viv Broughton

In live performances, Jackson was renowned for her physicality and the extraordinary emotional connections she held with her audiences. The New York Times stated she was a "massive, stately, even majestic woman, [who] possessed an awesome presence that was apparent in whatever milieu she chose to perform." So caught up in the spirit was she while singing, she often wept, fell on her knees, bowed, skipped, danced, clapped spontaneously, patted her sides and stomach, and particularly in churches, roamed the aisles to sing directly to individuals. All of these were typical of the services in black churches though Jackson's energy was remarkable. An experiment wearing a wig with her robes went awry during a show in the 1950s when she sang so frenetically she flung it off mid-performance. Anthony Heilbut writes that "some of her gestures are dramatically jerky, suggesting instant spirit possession", and called her performances "downright terrifying. At her best, Mahalia builds these songs to a frenzy of intensity almost demanding a release in holler and shout. When singing them she may descend to her knees, her combs scattering like so many cast-out demons." Jackson defended her idiosyncrasies, commenting: "How can you sing of amazing grace, how can you sing prayerfully of heaven and earth and all God's wonders without using your hands? My hands, my feet, I throw my whole body to say all that is within me. The mind and the voice by themselves are not sufficient." (Note: The guidance she received from Thomas Dorsey included altering her breathing, phrasing, and energy. Dorsey preferred a more sedate delivery and he encouraged her to use slower, more sentimental songs between uptempo numbers to smooth the roughness of her voice and communicate more effectively with the audience. Early in her career, she had a tendency to choose songs that were all uptempo and she often shouted in excitement at the beginning of and during songs, taking breaths erratically. One early admirer remembered, "People used to say, 'That woman sing too hard, she going to have TB!'" (Harris, p. 259.) Jackson took many of the lessons to heart; according to historian Robert Marovich, slower songs allowed her to "embellish the melodies and wring every ounce of emotion from the hymns".(Marovich, p. 122.) They also helped her catch her breath as she got older. (Burford, Mark, "Mahalia Jackson Meets the Wise Men: Defining Jazz at the Music Inn", The Musical Quarterly (Fall 2014), Vol. 97, No. 3, pp. 429–486.))

In line with improvising music, Jackson did not like to prepare what she would sing before concerts, and would often change song preferences based on what she was feeling at the moment, saying: "There's something the public reaches into me for, and there seems to be something in each audience that I can feel. I can feel whether there's a low spirit. Some places I go, up-tempo songs don't go, and other places, sad songs aren't right." She had an uncanny ability to elicit the same emotions from her audiences that she transmitted in her singing. People Today commented that "When Mahalia sings, audiences do more than just listen—they undergo a profoundly moving emotional experience." Jackson used "house wreckers", or songs that induced long tumultuous moments with audiences weeping, shouting, and moaning, especially in black churches. Gospel singer Evelyn Gaye recalled touring with her in 1938 when Jackson often sang "If You See My Savior Tell Him That You Saw Me", saying: "and the people, look like they were just awed by it, on a higher plane, gone. She had that type of rocking and that holy dance she'd get into—look like the people just submitted to it." White audiences also wept and responded emotionally. According to jazz writer Raymond Horricks, instead of preaching to listeners Jackson spoke about her personal faith and spiritual experiences "immediately and directly... making it difficult for them to turn away". Promoter Joe Bostic was in the audience of the 1958 Newport Jazz Festival, an outdoor concert that occurred during a downpour, and stated: "It was the most fantastic tribute to the hypnotic power of great artistry I have ever encountered. Nothing like it have I ever seen in my life. Those people sat... they forgot... they were completely entranced."

She didn't say it, but the implication was obvious. Mahalia Jackson doesn't sing to fracture any cats, or to capture any Billboard polls, or because she wants her recording contract renewed. She sings the way she does for the most basic of singing reasons, for the most honest of them all, without any frills, flourishes, or phoniness.

— Jazz writer George T. Simon

A significant part of Jackson's appeal was her demonstrated earnestness in her religious conviction. Bostic spoke of her abiding faith: "Mahalia never became so sophisticated that she lost her humility, her relationship with God as a divine being. She never got beyond that point; and many times, many times, you were amazed — at least I was, because she was such a tough business woman." During her tour of the Middle East, Jackson stood back in wonder while visiting Jericho, and road manager David Haber asked her if she truly thought trumpets brought down its walls. Jackson replied honestly: "I believe Joshua did pray to God, and the sun stood still. I believe everything." Gospel singer Cleophus Robinson asserted: "There never was any pretense, no sham about her. Wherever you met her it was like receiving a letter from home. She was a warm, carefree personality who gave you the feeling that you could relax and let your hair down whenever you were around her — backstage with her or in her home where she'd cook up some good gumbo for you whenever she had the time. A lot of people tried to make Mahalia act 'proper', and they'd tell her about her diction and such things but she paid them no mind. She never denied her background and she never lost her 'down home' sincerity." Television host Ed Sullivan said, "She was just so darned kind to everybody. When Mahalia sang, she took command. The band, the stage crew, the other performers, the ushers — they were all rooting for her. When she came out, she could be your mother or your sister. I mean, she wasn't obsequious, you know; she was a star among other stars. Other people may not have wanted to be deferential, but they couldn't help it. This woman was just great." Commenting on her personal intimacy, Neil Goodwin of The Daily Express wrote after attending her 1961 concert at the Royal Albert Hall: "Mahalia Jackson sang to ME last night." Others wrote of her ability to give listeners goosebumps or make the hair on their neck tingle.

=== Mildred Falls ===
Until 1946, Jackson used an assortment of pianists for recording and touring, choosing anyone who was convenient and free to go with her. As her career progressed, she found it necessary to have a pianist available at a moment's notice, someone talented enough to improvise with her yet steeped in religious music. Jackson found this in Mildred Falls (1921–1974), who accompanied her for 25 years. Falls is often acknowledged as a significant part of Jackson's sound and therefore her success. She was born Mildred Carter in Magnolia, Mississippi, learning to play on her family's upright piano, working with church choirs, and moving to California with a gospel singing group. A broken marriage resulted in her return to Chicago in 1947 when she was referred to Jackson who set up a brief training with Robert Anderson, a longtime member of Jackson's entourage. Falls accompanied her in nearly every performance and recording thereafter.

Always on the lookout for new material, Jackson received 25 to 30 compositions a month for her consideration. Falls played these so Jackson could "catch the message of the song". Once selections were made, Falls and Jackson memorized each composition, though while touring with Jackson, Falls was required to improvise as Jackson never sang a song the same way twice, even from rehearsal to a performance hours or minutes later. Falls found it necessary to watch Jackson's mannerisms and mouth instead of looking at the piano keys to keep up with her. At the beginning of a song, Falls might start in one key and receive hand signals from Jackson to change until Jackson felt the right key for the song in that moment. Falls remembered, "Mahalia waited until she heard exactly what was in her ear, and once she heard it, she went on about her business and she'd tear the house down."

Studs Terkel compared Falls to Paul Ulanowsky and Gerald Moore who played for classical singing stars Lotte Lehmann and Dietrich Fischer-Dieskau, respectively. Ralph Ellison called Falls and Jackson "the dynamic duo", saying that their performance at the 1958 Newport Jazz Festival created "a rhythmical drive such as is expected of the entire Basie band. It is all joy and exultation and swing, but it is nonetheless religious music." Falls' right hand playing, according to Ellison, substituted for the horns in an orchestra which was in constant "conversation" with Jackson's vocals. Her left hand provided a "walking bass line that gave the music its 'bounce'", common in stride and ragtime playing. Similarly, television host Dinah Shore called Falls' left hand "the strongest thing in the whole world", giving Jackson's music a prominent beat usually missing from religious music. When Shore's studio musicians attempted to pinpoint the cause of Jackson's rousing sound, Shore admonished them with humor, saying: "Mildred's got a left hand, that's what your problem is." Anthony Heilbut explained: "By Chicago choir standards her chordings and tempos were old-fashioned, but they always induced a subtle rock exactly suited to Mahalia's swing."

== Influence ==
=== On music ===
Jackson's influence was greatest in black gospel music. Beginning in the 1930s, Sallie Martin, Roberta Martin, Willie Mae Ford Smith, Artelia Hutchins, and Jackson spread the gospel blues style by performing in churches around the U.S. For 15 years the genre developed in relative isolation with choirs and soloists performing in a circuit of churches, revivals, and National Baptist Convention (NBC) meetings where music was shared and sold among musicians, songwriters, and ministers. The NBC boasted a membership of four million, a network that provided the source material that Jackson learned in her early years and from which she drew during her recording career.

Though Jackson was not the first gospel blues soloist to record, historian Robert Marovich identifies her success with "Move On Up a Little Higher" as the event that launched gospel music from a niche movement in Chicago churches to a genre that became commercially viable nationwide. The "Golden Age of Gospel", occurring between 1945 and 1965, presented dozens of gospel music acts on radio, records, and in concerts in secular venues. Jackson's success was recognized by the NBC when she was named its official soloist, and uniquely, she was bestowed universal respect in a field of very competitive and sometimes territorial musicians. Marovich explains that she "was the living embodiment of gospel music's ecumenism and was welcomed everywhere".

The Cambridge Companion to Blues and Gospel Music identifies Jackson and Sam Cooke, whose music career started when he joined the Soul Stirrers, as the most important figures in black gospel music in the 1950s. To the majority of new fans, however, "Mahalia was the vocal, physical, spiritual symbol of gospel music", according to Heilbut. Raymond Horricks writes: "People who hold different religious beliefs to her own, and even people who have no religious beliefs whatsoever, are impressed by and give their immediate attention to her singing. She has, almost singlehandedly, brought about a wide, and often non-religious interest in the gospel singing of the Negro." Because she was often asked by white jazz and blues fans to define what she sang, she became gospel's most prominent defender, saying: "Blues are the songs of despair. Gospel songs are the songs of hope. When you sing gospel you have a feeling there's a cure for what's wrong. When you're through with the blues you've got nothing to rest on."

As gospel music became accessible to mainstream audiences, its stylistic elements became pervasive in popular music as a whole. Jackson, who enjoyed music of all kinds, noticed, attributing the emotional punch of rock and roll to Pentecostal singing. Her Decca records were the first to feature the sound of a Hammond organ, spawning many copycats and resulting in its use in popular music, especially those evoking a soulful sound, for decades after. The first R&B and rock and roll singers employed the same devices that Jackson and her cohorts in gospel singing used, including ecstatic melisma, shouting, moaning, clapping, and stomping. Heilbut writes: "With the exception of Chuck Berry and Fats Domino, there is scarcely a pioneer rock and roll singer who didn't owe his stuff to the great gospel lead singers." Specifically, Little Richard, Mavis Staples of the Staple Singers, Donna Summer, Sam Cooke, Ray Charles, Della Reese, and Aretha Franklin have all named Jackson as an inspiration. Jackson was inducted into the Rock and Roll Hall of Fame in the Early influence category in 1997. Mavis Staples justified her inclusion at the ceremony, saying: "When she sang, you would just feel light as a feather. God, I couldn't get enough of her." Franklin, who studied Jackson since she was a child and sang "Take My Hand, Precious Lord" at her funeral, was placed at Rolling Stone's number one spot in their list of 100 Greatest Singers of All Time, compiled in 2010. Despite her influence, Jackson was mostly displeased that gospel music was being used for secular purposes, considering R&B and soul music to be perversions, exploiting the music to make money.

=== On Black identity ===
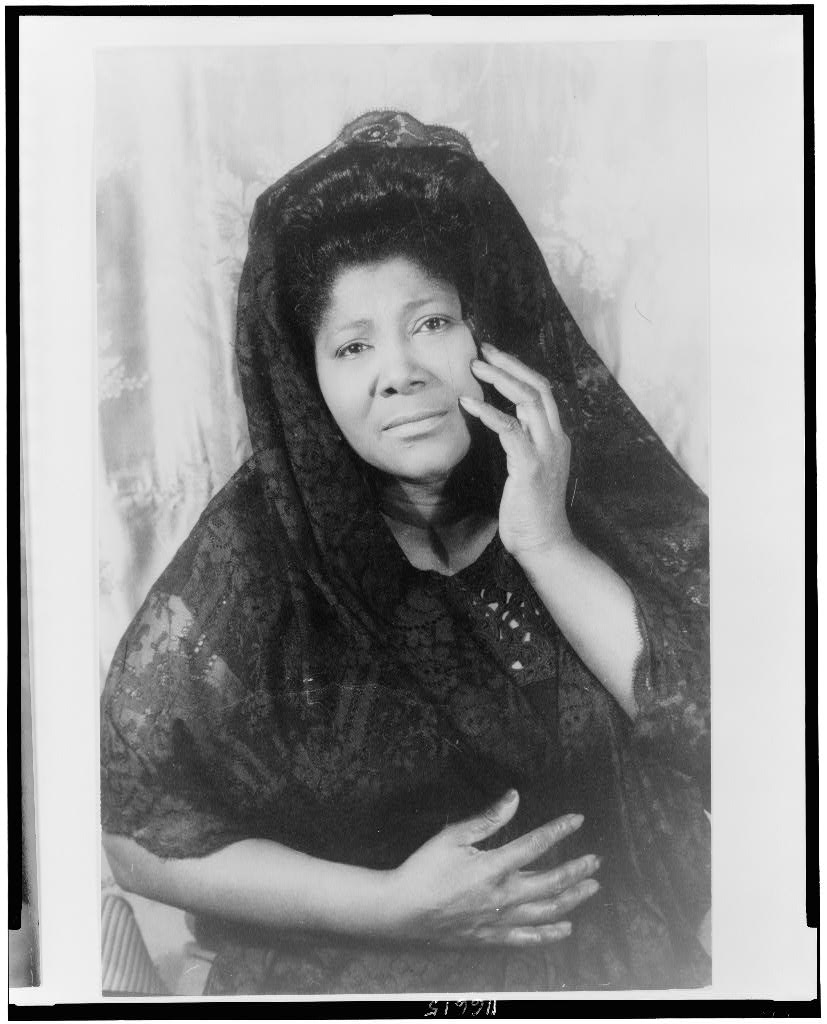
Jackson in 1962, photographed by Carl Van Vechten

Jackson's success had a profound effect on Black American identity, particularly for those who did not assimilate comfortably into white society. Though she and gospel blues were denigrated by members of the black upper class into the 1950s, for middle and lower class Black Americans her life was a rags to riches story in which she remained relentlessly positive and unapologetically at ease with herself and her mannerisms in the company of white people. In Imitation of Life, her portrayal as a funeral singer embodied sorrow for the character Annie, a maid who dies from heartbreak. Scholar Johari Jabir writes that in this role, "Jackson conjures up the unspeakable fatigue and collective weariness of centuries of black women." Through her music, she promoted hope and celebrated resilience in the black American experience. Jackson was often compared to opera singer Marian Anderson, as they both toured Europe, included spirituals in their repertoires, and sang in similar settings. Jackson considered Anderson an inspiration, and earned an invitation to sing at Constitution Hall in 1960, 21 years after the Daughters of the American Revolution forbade Anderson from performing there in front of an integrated audience. But Jackson's preference for the musical influence, casual language, and intonation of Black Americans was a sharp contrast to Anderson's refined manners and concentration on European music. In interviews, Jackson repeatedly credits aspects of Black culture that played a significant part in the development of her style: remnants of slavery music she heard at churches, work songs from vendors on the streets of New Orleans, and blues and jazz bands. Her first national television appearance on Ed Sullivan's Toast of the Town in 1952 showed her singing authentic gospel blues, prompting a large parade in her honor in Dayton, Ohio, with 50,000 black attendees – more than the integrated audience that showed up for a Harry Truman campaign stop around the same time. Known for her excited shouts, Jackson once called out "Glory!" on her CBS television show, following quickly with: "Excuse me, CBS, I didn't know where I was." By retaining her dialect and singing style, she challenged a sense of shame among many middle and lower class black Americans for their disparaged speech patterns and accents. Evelyn Cunningham of the Pittsburgh Courier attended a Jackson concert in 1954, writing that she expected to be embarrassed by Jackson, but "when she sang, she made me choke up and feel wondrously proud of my people and my heritage. She made me drop my bonds and become really emancipated."

Malcolm X noted that Jackson was "the first Negro that Negroes made famous". White radio host Studs Terkel was surprised to learn Jackson had a large black following before he found her records, saying: "For a stupid moment, I had thought that I discovered Mahalia Jackson." Jazz composer Duke Ellington, counting himself as a fan of Jackson's since 1952, asked her to appear on his album Black, Brown and Beige (1958), an homage to black American life and culture. Due to her decision to sing gospel exclusively she initially rejected the idea, but relented when Ellington asked her to improvise on the 23rd Psalm. She was featured on the album's vocal rendition of Ellington's composition "Come Sunday", which subsequently became a jazz standard. As she became more famous, spending time in concert halls, she continued to attend and perform in black churches, often for free, to connect with congregations and other gospel singers. Believing that black wealth and capital should be reinvested into black people, Jackson designed her line of chicken restaurants to be black-owned and operated. She organized a 1969 concert called A Salute to Black Women, the proceeds of which were given to her foundation providing college scholarships to black youth. Upon her death, singer Harry Belafonte called her "the most powerful black woman in the United States" and there was "not a single field hand, a single black worker, a single black intellectual who did not respond to her".

=== Biopics ===
Mahalia Jackson was portrayed by American singer Ledisi in the historical drama film Selma (2014). Remember Me: The Mahalia Jackson Story, a biopic portraying her life and career, was released in September 2022, with Ledisi reprising as Mahalia. Ledisi received a nomination for Outstanding Breakthrough Performance in a Motion Picture and the film received a nomination for Outstanding Independent Motion Picture at the 54th NAACP Image Awards in 2023.

== Filmography ==
Film performances
Year	Title	Role	Notes
1958	St. Louis Blues	Missionary	Features "Noah Heist the Window" and "He That Sows in Tears"
1959	Imitation of Life	Funeral singer	Features "Troubles of the World"
1959	Jazz on a Summer's Day	Herself	Captures her performance at the 1958 Newport Jazz Festival
1964	The Best Man	Herself	Features "Down by the Riverside"
2021	Summer of Soul	Herself	Features performance at the 1969 Harlem Cultural Festival

== Honors ==
Award name	Nominee / work	Year	Result / notes
Grand Prix du Disque from Académie Charles Cros	"I Can Put My Trust In Jesus"	1951	Won
Grammy Award	Everytime I Feel The Spirit	1961	Won
Grammy Award	Great Songs of Love And Faith	1962	Won
Grammy Award	How I Got Over	1976	Won
Grammy Award	Make A Joyful Noise Unto the Lord	1963	Nominated
Grammy Award	Guide Me, O Thou Great Jehovah (Note: The song "Guide Me, O Thou Great Jehovah" appears on the Columbia album Mahalia Jackson Sings the Gospel Right Out of Church (Vinyl CS 9813); Jackson did not release an album titled Guide Me, O Thou Great Jehovah but the Recording Academy website lists the album this way.)	1969	Nominated
Grammy Award	I Sing Because I'm Happy, Volumes 1 And 2	1980	Nominated
Grammy Lifetime Achievement Award		1972	
National Recording Registry	"Move On Up a Little Higher"	2005	The National Recording Registry includes sound recordings considered "culturally, historically or aesthetically significant" by the Library of Congress
Halls of fame
Grammy Hall of Fame	"Move On Up a Little Higher" (1947)	1998	
Grammy Hall of Fame	"Take My Hand, Precious Lord" (1956)	2012	
Grammy Hall of Fame	"His Eye Is On the Sparrow" (1958)	2010	
Gospel Music Hall of Fame		1978	
Hollywood Walk of Fame		1988	Star located at 6840 Hollywood Boulevard
Rock and Roll Hall of Fame		1997	Early influence category
Louisiana Music Hall of Fame		2008	
Rhythm and Blues Music Hall of Fame		2020	
Black Music & Entertainment Walk of Fame		2023	
Honorary degrees
Lincoln College		1963	Doctorate of Humane Letters
Marymount College, Tarrytown (now Fordham University)		1971	Doctorate of Music
DePaul University		1971	Doctorate of Humane Letters and St. Vincent de Paul Medal given to "persons who exemplify the spirit of the university's patron by serving God through addressing the needs of the human family"
The Lincoln Academy of Illinois		1967	Laureate convocation
Other
Mahalia Jackson Theater of the Performing Arts, New Orleans		Established 1973	
Minor planet 65769 Mahalia		Named in 1995	
NPR's 50 Great Voices		2010	
Rolling Stone's The 200 Greatest Singers of All Time		2023	No. 28

== See also ==
- List of best-selling gospel music artists
