= List of Cleveland Browns broadcasters =

Since 2013, radio coverage of the Cleveland Browns professional football team has originated from flagship stations WKNR (850 AM), WKRK-FM (92.3 FM) and WNCX (98.5 FM). Play-by-play announcer Andrew Siciliano, color commentator Nathan Zegura and sideline analyst/reporter Je'Rod Cherry form the radio team. Spanish-language broadcasts originate over WJMO (1300 AM) with announcers Rafa Hernández-Brito and Octavio Sequera.

WEWS (channel 5) is the preseason TV home of the Browns, with veteran national announcer Chris Rose (play by play), Joe Thomas (color commentary) and sideline reporter Aditi Kinkhabwala comprising the broadcast team.

== Radio ==
The following is a list of sportscasters who have covered the Browns over the radio throughout the team's history (including its first four seasons as a member of the All-America Football Conference and original incarnation in the NFL from 1950 to 1995), split by play-by-play and commentary. The team began using radio sideline reporters upon its return to the NFL in 1999. Gold shading indicates championship season.

Year	Radio	Play-by-play	Commentary	Sideline
1946	WGAR (Note: WGAR became WKNR in 1990; currently home to WHKW.)	Bob Neal	Stan Gee	
1947	WGAR	Bob Neal	Bill Mayer	
1948	WGAR	Bob Neal	Bill Mayer	
1949	WGAR	Bob Neal	Bill Mayer	
1950	WERE (Note: WERE became WJMO in 2007.)	Bob Neal		
1951	WERE	Bob Neal		
1952	WTAM (Note: WTAM became KYW in 1956, WKYC in 1965, WWWE in 1972 and reverted to the WTAM calls in 1996.)	Ken Coleman		
1953	WTAM	Ken Coleman		
1954	WGAR	Bill McColgan	Bill Mayer	
1955	WGAR	Bill McColgan	Jim Graner	
1956	WGAR	Bill McColgan	Jim Graner	
1957	WGAR	Bill McColgan	Jim Graner	
1958	WGAR	Bill McColgan	Jim Graner	
1959	WGAR	Bill McColgan	Jim Graner	
1960	WGAR	Bill McColgan	Jim Graner	
1961	WGAR	Gib Shanley		
1962	WERE	Gib Shanley		
1963	WERE	Gib Shanley	Jim Graner	
1964	WERE	Gib Shanley	Jim Graner	
1965	WERE	Gib Shanley	Jim Graner	
1966	WERE	Gib Shanley	Jim Graner	
1967	WERE	Gib Shanley	Jim Graner	
1968	WHK	Gib Shanley	Jim Graner	
1969	WHK	Gib Shanley	Jim Graner	
1970	WHK	Gib Shanley	Jim Graner	
1971	WHK	Gib Shanley	Jim Graner	
1972	WHK	Gib Shanley	Jim Graner	
1973	WHK	Gib Shanley	Jim Graner	
1974	WHK	Gib Shanley	Jim Graner	
1975	WHK	Gib Shanley	Jim Mueller	
1976	WHK	Gib Shanley	Jim Mueller	
1977	WHK	Gib Shanley	Jim Mueller	
1978	WHK	Gib Shanley	Jim Mueller	
1979	WHK	Gib Shanley	Jim Mueller	
1980	WHK	Gib Shanley	Jim Mueller	
1981	WHK	Gib Shanley	Jim Mueller	
1982	WHK	Gib Shanley	Jim Mueller	
1983	WHK	Gib Shanley	Jim Mueller	
1984	WHK	Gib Shanley	Jim Mueller	
1985	WWWE; WDOK	Nev Chandler; Jim Mueller	Doug Dieken	
1986	WWWE; WDOK	Nev Chandler; Jim Mueller	Doug Dieken	
1987	WWWE; WDOK	Nev Chandler	Doug Dieken	
1988	WWWE; WDOK	Nev Chandler	Doug Dieken	
1989	WWWE; WDOK	Nev Chandler	Doug Dieken	
1990	WWWE; WLTF	Nev Chandler	Doug Dieken	
1991	WHK; WMMS	Nev Chandler	Doug Dieken	
1992	WHK; WMMS	Nev Chandler	Doug Dieken	
1993	WHK; WMMS	Nev Chandler	Doug Dieken	
1994	WKNR; WDOK	Casey Coleman	Doug Dieken	
1995	WKNR; WDOK	Casey Coleman	Doug Dieken	
1996	n/a; franchise inactive			
1997	n/a; franchise inactive			
1998	n/a; franchise inactive			
1999	WMJI; WTAM	Jim Donovan	Doug Dieken	Casey Coleman
2000	WMJI; WTAM	Jim Donovan	Doug Dieken	Casey Coleman
2001	WMMS; WTAM	Jim Donovan	Doug Dieken	Casey Coleman
2002	WMMS; WTAM	Jim Donovan	Doug Dieken	Casey Coleman
2003	WMMS; WTAM	Jim Donovan	Doug Dieken	Casey Coleman
2004	WMMS; WTAM	Jim Donovan	Doug Dieken	Casey Coleman
2005	WMMS; WTAM	Jim Donovan	Doug Dieken	Casey Coleman
2006	WMMS; WTAM	Jim Donovan	Doug Dieken	Casey Coleman (Note: Coleman died while the 2006 season was in progress, with Knott taking over immediately thereafter (as he had already been filling in during Coleman's illness).); Andre Knott
2007	WMMS; WTAM	Mike Snyder (preseason); Jim Donovan (Note: From 2007-2012 during the preseason, Donovan called the games on TV, Mike Snyder called them on radio, and Donovan went back to radio for the regular season. When the Browns changed radio flagships for the 2013 season, Jeff Phelps called preseason games on radio)	Doug Dieken	Andre Knott
2008	WMMS; WTAM	Mike Snyder (preseason); Jim Donovan	Doug Dieken	Andre Knott
2009	WMMS; WTAM	Mike Snyder (preseason); Jim Donovan	Doug Dieken	Andre Knott
2010	WMMS; WTAM	Mike Snyder (preseason); Jim Donovan	Doug Dieken	Jamir Howerton
2011	WMMS; WTAM	Mike Snyder (preseason); Jim Donovan (Note: Mike Snyder also filled in for Donovan for two games during the 2011 season related to his treatment for leukemia.)	Doug Dieken	Jamir Howerton
2012	WMMS; WTAM	Mike Snyder (preseason); Jim Donovan	Doug Dieken	Jamir Howerton
2013	WKNR (Note: Renamed from WRMR in 2001 and is the successor to the original WKNR; see 2001 in radio.); WKRK-FM; WNCX	Jeff Phelps (preseason); Jim Donovan	Doug Dieken	Jamir Howerton
2014	WKNR; WKRK-FM; WNCX	Jeff Phelps (preseason); Jim Donovan	Doug Dieken	Nathan Zegura
2015	WKNR; WKRK-FM; WNCX	Jim Donovan	Doug Dieken	Nathan Zegura
2016	WKNR; WKRK-FM; WNCX	Jim Donovan	Doug Dieken	Nathan Zegura
2017	WKNR; WKRK-FM; WNCX	Jim Donovan	Doug Dieken	Nathan Zegura
2018	WKNR; WKRK-FM; WNCX	Jim Donovan	Doug Dieken	Dustin Fox; Nathan Zegura (Note: Nathan Zegura was suspended for eight games during the 2018 season after an altercation with an NFL referee; Dustin Fox of co-flagship WKRK-FM filled in for Zegura.)
2019	WKNR; WKRK-FM; WNCX	Jim Donovan	Doug Dieken	Nathan Zegura
2020	WKNR; WKRK-FM; WNCX	Jim Donovan	Doug Dieken	Nathan Zegura
2021	WKNR; WKRK-FM; WNCX	Jim Donovan	Doug Dieken	Nathan Zegura
2022	WKNR; WKRK-FM; WNCX	Jim Donovan	Nathan Zegura	Je'Rod Cherry
2023	WKNR; WKRK-FM; WNCX	Jim Donovan; Various fill-ins (Note: Following the season opener, Donovan announced he would step away from the broadcast team to undergo treatment for leukemia, with Chris Rose, Andrew Siciliano, Paul Keels and Tom McCarthy filling in during his absence. Donovan returned for the week 11 game on November 19.)	Nathan Zegura	Je'Rod Cherry
2024	WKNR; WKRK-FM; WNCX	Jim Donovan (preseason) (Note: Donovan announced his retirement shortly before the start of the regular season due to undergoing treatment for cancer, with Siciliano named as his replacement); Andrew Siciliano	Je'Rod Cherry (preseason); Nathan Zegura	Ken Carman (preseason); Je'Rod Cherry
2025	WKNR; WKRK-FM; WNCX	Andrew Siciliano	Nathan Zegura	Je'Rod Cherry
2026	WKNR; WKRK-FM; WNCX	Andrew Siciliano	Nathan Zegura	Je'Rod Cherry

=== Spanish ===
Year	Radio	Play-by-play	Commentary
2023	WNZN; WVKO-FM	Rafa Hernández-Brito	Octavio Sequera
2024	WJMO (Note: WJMO became the Spanish-language flagship on November 1, 2024.); WNZN; WWLA/WJYD (Note: WVKO-FM became WWLA in 2024 and added WJYD as a simulcast.)	Rafa Hernández-Brito	Octavio Sequera
2025	WJMO; WNZN; WWLA/WJYD	Rafa Hernández-Brito	Octavio Sequera
2026	WJMO; WNZN; WWLA/WJYD	Rafa Hernández-Brito	Octavio Sequera

== Television ==
=== Preseason TV ===
Year	Affiliate	Play-by-play	Commentary	Sideline
1999	WKYC	Michael Reghi	Bob Golic	
2000	WKYC	Don Criqui	Todd Blackledge	
2001	WKYC	Don Criqui	Todd Blackledge	
2002	WKYC	Don Criqui	Todd Blackledge	
2003	WKYC	Don Criqui	Todd Blackledge	
2004	WKYC	Don Criqui	Todd Blackledge	
2005	WOIO	Sam Rosen	Brian Brennan; Bob Golic (Note: Golic served as play-by-play announcer for the first game, with Rosen then taking over for the remainder of the preseason.); Reggie Rucker	Sharon Reed
2006	WKYC (Note: The Browns voided their three-year preseason contract with WOIO on July 18, 2006, after the station's news coverage of the drowning of then-team owner Randy Lerner's six-year-old niece. A replacement contract with WKYC was announced on August 3, 2006.)	Sam Rosen	Brian Brennan; Bernie Kosar	
2007	WKYC	Jim Donovan	Bernie Kosar	Dave Chudowski
2008	WKYC	Jim Donovan	Bernie Kosar	Dave Chudowski
2009	WKYC	Jim Donovan	Bernie Kosar	Dave Chudowski
2010	WKYC	Jim Donovan	Bernie Kosar	Dave Chudowski
2011	WKYC	Andrew Catalon (Note: Andrew Catalon filled in for Jim Donovan during the 2011 preseason during Donovan's recovery from a bone marrow transplant.)	Bernie Kosar	Dave Chudowski
2012	WKYC	Jim Donovan	Bernie Kosar	Dave Chudowski
2013	WKYC	Jim Donovan	Bernie Kosar	Dave Chudowski
2014	WKYC	Jim Donovan	Solomon Wilcots	Dave Chudowski
2015	WEWS	Mike Patrick	Solomon Wilcots	Andy Baskin
2016	WEWS	Mike Patrick	Solomon Wilcots	Andy Baskin
2017	WEWS	Mike Patrick	Solomon Wilcots	Andy Baskin
2018	WEWS	Jay Crawford	Tim Couch	Jon Doss
2019	WEWS	Jay Crawford	Tim Couch	Jon Doss
2020	n/a; preseason cancelled due to the COVID-19 pandemic			
2021	WEWS	Tom McCarthy	Joe Thomas	Nathan Zegura
2022	WEWS	Chris Rose	Joe Thomas	Aditi Kinkhabwala
2023	WEWS	Chris Rose	Joe Thomas	Aditi Kinkhabwala
2024	WEWS	Chris Rose	Nathan Zegura	Aditi Kinkhabwala
2025	WEWS	Chris Rose	Joe Thomas	Aditi Kinkabwala
2026	WEWS	Chris Rose	Joe Thomas	Aditi Kinkabwala
