= Cleveland Browns Radio Network =

Regional play-by-play radio network

- Type: Radio network
- Branding: The University Hospitals Cleveland Browns Radio Network
- Country: United States
- Headquarters: Cleveland, Ohio
- Broadcast area: Ohio; Pennsylvania (limited); West Virginia (limited); New York (limited)
- Owner: Cleveland Browns
- Established: 1946 (over WGAR radio); 1948 (network operations)
- Affiliations: NFL; Audacy, Inc.; Good Karma Sports; La Mega Media; Urban One
- Affiliates: English: 25 (including 3 flagships); Spanish: 4 (including 1 flagship)
- Webcast: Listen live (via TuneIn)
- Official website: Browns Radio Network

The University Hospitals Cleveland Browns Radio Network is an American radio network composed of 24 radio stations which carry English-language coverage of the Cleveland Browns, a professional football team in the National Football League (NFL). Andrew Siciliano is the team's lead announcer, Nathan Zegura serves as commentator and Je'Rod Cherry is the sideline analyst/reporter. Jim Donovan served as lead announcer following the team's return in 1999 until his retirement prior to the 2024 season.

Since 2013, Cleveland market stations WKNR (850 AM), WKRK-FM (92.3 FM), and WNCX (98.5 FM) have served as the network's three flagships, an arrangement noted for competing ownership among the stations: WKNR is owned by Good Karma Sports, while WKRK-FM and WNCX are owned by Audacy, Inc. (formerly CBS Radio). The network also includes 22 affiliates in the U.S. states of Ohio, Pennsylvania, West Virginia and New York: ten AM stations, seven of which supplement their signals with a low-power FM translator, and twelve full-power FM stations. Additionally, Spanish-language coverage originates over Cleveland station WJMO (1300 AM) and three affiliates on the FM dial, all in Ohio.

In addition to traditional over-the-air AM and FM broadcasts, network programming airs on satellite radio via SiriusXM and is available online via SiriusXM, TuneIn and NFL+. The University Hospitals Health System of Cleveland, Ohio, has owned the naming rights to the network since the 2017 season.

== History ==
=== Original franchise (1946–1995) ===
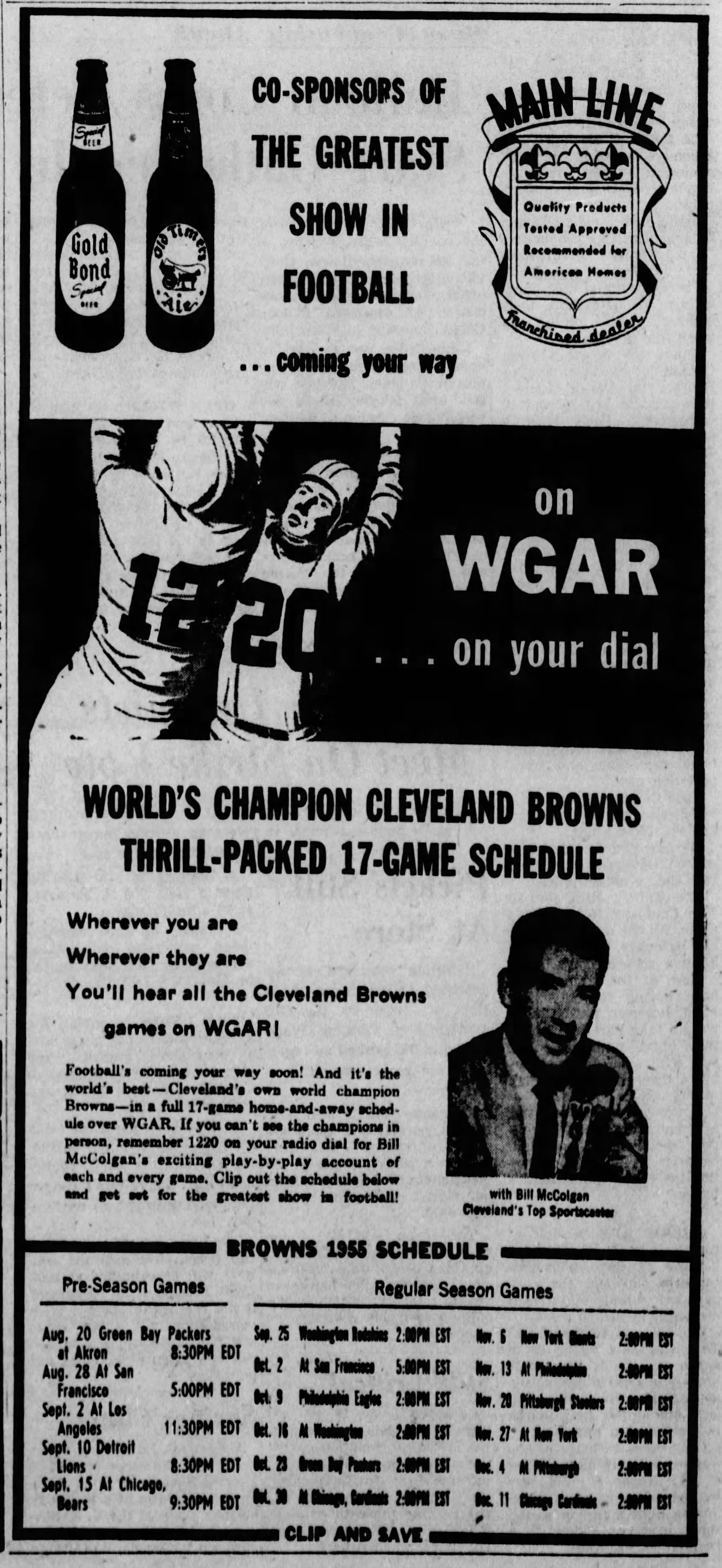
1956 ad for WGAR's Cleveland Browns football coverage, with Bill McColgan providing play-by-play.

Radio broadcasts for the Cleveland Browns date back to the team's inaugural 1946 season in the All-America Football Conference, with WGAR (1220 AM) as the initial flagship station; WGAR sportscaster Bob Neal and Stan Gee were the team's first announcers. Bill Mayer took over as Neal's color commentator in 1947 in addition to his duties as WGAR's morning drive host. WGAR also carried a weekly 15-minute show during the football season by head coach Paul Brown, the Browns' co-founder and namesake. A five-station network was assembled for the 1948 season consisting of WGAR, WATG in Ashland, WBNS in Columbus, WHIO in Dayton, WFRO-FM in Fremont, WJEL in Springfield and WTRF in Bellaire; stations in Lima, Toledo, Zanesville, Marion and Cincinnati were added the following year. WLAL in Lakewood, a short-lived FM station owned by Browns owner Arthur B. McBride, was also an affiliate in 1948 and 1949. By 1952, the network spanned 16 stations in Ohio, West Virginia, Kentucky and Pennsylvania.

WGAR served as the flagship until the 1950 season, the team's first with the National Football League, when WERE (1300 AM) took over; Neal also moved to WERE but was replaced due to his announcing for Cleveland Indians telecasts being sponsored by Pfeiffer Brewing Co., rival to the Brewing Corp. of America which sponsored the Browns network. WTAM carried the games in 1952 and 1953 with Ken Coleman as announcer, WGAR reclaimed the flagship rights the following year. Through all but one year of WGAR's second stint as flagship, Bill McColgan handled play-by-play; while Bill Kelly returned in 1954, Jim Graner replaced him as color commentator the following year. Gib Shanley took over as the team's sole announcer 1961 in addition to becoming WGAR's sports director and announcer for Ohio State football.

The games moved back to WERE in 1962, with the network consisting of over 50 radio stations. WHK took over as flagship in 1968 when WERE signed up with the Cincinnati Bengals Radio Network (the Bengals were also founded by Paul Brown). By the 1974 season, the network consisted of WHK and 34 affiliates, including three stations in Pennsylvania; all but five stations broadcast on the AM band. Shanley was paired with Graner beginning in 1963 and continued in their roles until the start of the 1975 season, when Graner retired after being diagnosed with a brain tumor. Jim Mueller took over for Graner as color commentator.

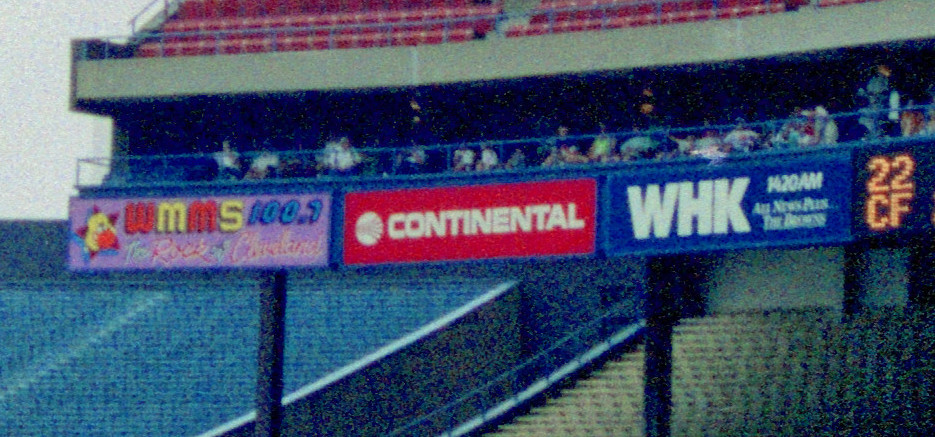
Signage for WHK and WMMS at Cleveland Municipal Stadium; WHK and WMMS were co-flagships from 1991 to 1994, while WMMS was co-flagship again from 2001 to 2012.

WHK's role as flagship ended when team owner Art Modell tried unsuccessfully to move the broadcast rights onto WJW (850 AM), a station he had owned since 1977 but consistently lost money on. Robert Gries, a minority owner, sued Modell on charges of anti-competitive practices on December 15, 1983, while WHK exercised an option to carry the team through the 1984 season which was also Gib Shanley's last as lead announcer. Modell's syndicate, Lake Erie Broadcasting signed a multi-year deal with the team on February 18, 1985, sold WJW and purchased WWWE (Note: Originally WTAM, renamed KYW in 1956, WKYC in 1965 and WWWE in 1972. Reverted to WTAM in 1996.) and WDOK, transferring the broadcast rights to the latter two stations.

Doug Dieken, who recently retired after 14 seasons as left tackle for the team, expressed a desire to become one of the announcers and joined Mueller and Nev Chandler as color commentator beginning in 1985; Mueller left after the 1986 season. Lake Erie sold both stations in 1987 but WWWE carried the games until 1991, while WLTF took over as FM flagship in 1990. (Note: In December 1989, Booth American, owner of WRMR and WLTF, purchased WWWE from Independent Group, Inc., then sold WRMR back to Independent Group in an asset swap. Booth American also purchased the production rights to the Browns broadcasts.) WHK and WMMS signed a three-year contract in 1991, prevailing in a bidding war over WKNR (1220 AM) (Note: Renamed from WGAR in 1990.) and WWWE/WLTF. WKNR subsequently teamed up with WDOK for a two-year contract in 1994 with game coverage produced by a third party on behalf of the team.

Prior to the 1994 season, Nev Chandler died from colon cancer on August 7, with Casey Coleman (son of Ken Coleman and a water boy for the team during Ken's tenure as announcer) taking over as lead announcer alongside Dieken. Coleman's tenure as announcer was complicated by his public support of then-head coach Bill Belichick, whom the fan base disapproved of, along with Chandler's substantial popularity and acclaim. The 1995 season became overshadowed by the team's announced relocation to Baltimore by Modell mid-season. WKNR and WDOK continued to carry the games for the remainder of the season, but with public service announcements airing after the majority of advertisers cancelled their sponsorships. For the team's last two seasons, the Browns radio network had 40 affiliates in 1994 and 49 in 1995.

During the 1997 and 1998 NFL seasons, WKNR originated Countdown to '99, a weekly hour-long program co-hosted by Dieken and Marc Kestecher over many former Browns radio network affiliates. WKNR produced the show on behalf of an intellectual property trust established by the NFL during the franchise's interregnum.

=== Expansion franchise (1999–present) ===
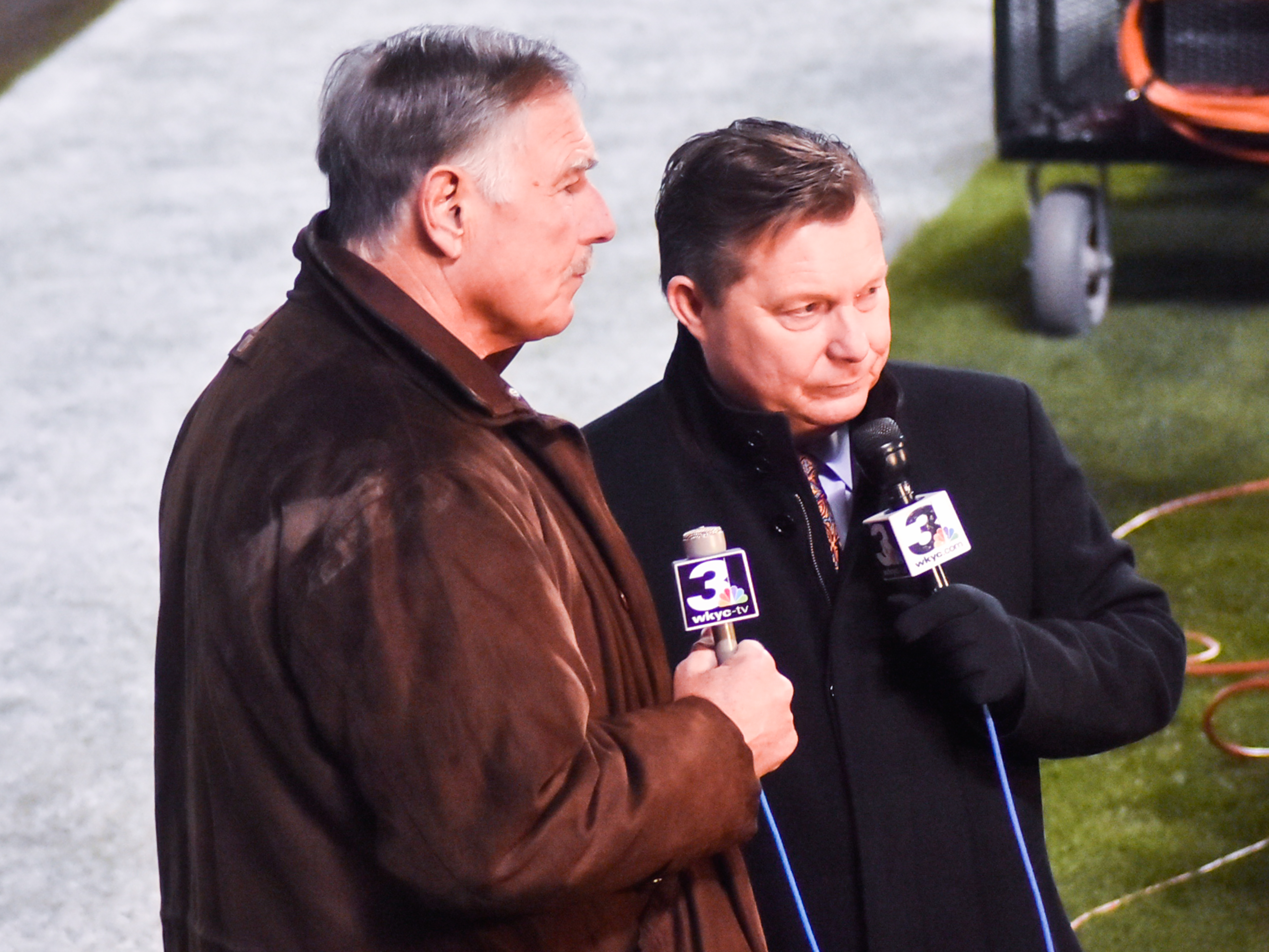
Doug Dieken and Jim Donovan, the Cleveland Browns' primary radio announcing team from 1999 to 2021.

Following reactivation of the Cleveland Browns franchise in 1999, flagship rights were awarded to Jacor (with a pending merger into Clear Channel) with WMJI as the flagship and WTAM simulcasting the majority of games which did not conflict with the station's Indians and Cavaliers commitments. Jim Donovan was named as the team's lead announcer, joining Dieken and Coleman, who was now the team's sideline reporter. Secondary programming, including a weekly show featuring the Browns head coach, aired exclusively on WTAM. The flagship rights were transferred to WMMS for the 2002 season in a bid to boost that station's low ratings.

Coleman, who was also a co-host on WTAM's morning-drive program, remained as sideline reporter until his death on November 28, 2006, after a year-long battle with pancreatic cancer. The team honored Coleman the previous month by renaming the field house at their Berea, Ohio, indoor practice facility after him. WTAM sportscaster/team beat reporter Andre Knott filled in for Coleman during the 2006 season and took over the role on a full-time basis the following season. The Browns replaced Knott with team employee Jamir Howerton at the start of the 2010 season and again with Nathan Zegura in 2014. During the 2011 season, Donovan missed two regular season games following his treatment for leukemia earlier in the year; WTAM sports director Mike Snyder filled in both times.

On March 28, 2013, the Cleveland Browns announced a new long-term deal with Good Karma Broadcasting (now Good Karma Sports as of August 2026) and CBS Radio, awarding the flagship rights to Good Karma's WKNR (850 AM) (Note: Renamed from WRMR in 2001 and is the successor to the original WKNR; see 2001 in radio.) and CBS Radio's WKRK-FM and WNCX. WKNR had already been airing Cleveland Browns Daily, an hour-long program produced year-round by the team, since July 2011 via a cooperative agreement; under this contract, the show expanded to two hours as a centerpiece of over 1,000 annual hours of ancillary team-produced programming. Craig Karmazin, founder of Good Karma, proposed the deal with CBS, likening it to the existing CBS–Turner Sports co-op for NCAA men's basketball tournament coverage and saw the Browns being such a strong community asset that it could be workable. This arrangement between Good Karma and Entercom (succeeding owners of WKRK-FM and WNCX; now named Audacy, Inc.) was renewed effective with the 2020 season.

During Baker Mayfield's rookie season as Cleveland Browns quarterback, KREF in Norman, Oklahoma, joined the network on October 5, 2018, for the remainder of the 2018 season. KREF owner Randy Laffoon made the arrangement to provide Oklahoma Sooners fans a chance to follow Mayfield, having previously carried St. Louis Rams games after that team drafted former Sooner quarterback Sam Bradford. KAKC in Tulsa, Oklahoma, signed a three-year affiliation deal prior to the 2019 season after discovering the Mayfield-led Browns drew higher television ratings that the Dallas Cowboys in Oklahoma City. Both stations dropped their affiliations after Mayfield's 2022 departure from the team.

Doug Dieken announced his retirement as color commentator at the conclusion of the 2021 season, concluding a 37-year run in broadcasting and 51 years of involvement with the team; the radio broadcast booth at FirstEnergy Stadium was renamed in his honor. Nathan Zegura was subsequently named as Dieken's replacement in the booth, while former NFL player and WKNR afternoon host Je'Rod Cherry was named the team's new sideline reporter. Donovan went on medical leave following the 2023 season opener to undergo treatment for leukemia, which had relapsed; various broadcasters, including Chris Rose, Andrew Siciliano and Paul Keels served as interim play-by-play announcers in his absence.

Prior to the start of the 2024 season, Donovan announced his retirement, stating that his cancer "has returned and very aggressively". Andrew Sciliano was officially named as the team's lead announcer days later; a longtime fan of the Browns, Siciliano said, "I'm honored for the opportunity, but wish the circumstances were different... I know I have big shoes to fill." On October 26, 2024, Donovan died from chronic lymphocytic leukemia at the age of 68.

== Programming ==
Network programming includes a four-hour pregame show and a two-hour postgame show, in addition to all games being called live on-site; WKNR originates the pregame show while WKRK-FM originates the postgame show. WKNR and WKRK-FM simulcast some ancillary team-produced programming for the network including a Wednesday night preview show and a Thursday night program with the team's head coach (Kevin Stefanski), while weekday afternoon program Cleveland Browns Daily originates over WKNR on a year-round basis.

== Announcers ==
Play-by-play	Commentary	Sideline
Andrew Siciliano	Nathan Zegura	Je'Rod Cherry
Rafa Hernández-Brito (Spanish)	Octavio Sequera (Spanish)	—N/a

== Station list ==
Network stations as of the 2025 Browns season
Media market	State	Station	Frequency	Network status
Jamestown	New York	WQFX-FM	103.1 FM	Affiliate
Akron	Ohio	WAKR	1590 AM	Affiliate
Akron	Ohio	W228EL	93.5 FM	WAKR relay
Akron	Ohio	WONE-FM	97.5 FM	Affiliate
Canton	Ohio	WHBC	1480 AM	Affiliate
Canton	Ohio	WHBC-FM	94.1 FM	Affiliate
Celina	Ohio	WKKI	94.3 FM	Affiliate
Cleveland	Ohio	WKNR	850 AM	Flagship
Cleveland	Ohio	WKRK-FM	92.3 FM	Flagship
Cleveland	Ohio	WNCX	98.5 FM	Flagship
Columbus	Ohio	WBNS	1460 AM	Affiliate
Columbus	Ohio	WBNS-FM	97.1 FM	Affiliate
Dayton	Ohio	WHIO	1290 AM	Affiliate
Dayton	Ohio	WHIO-FM	95.7 FM	Affiliate
Dover–New Phila.	Ohio	WJER	1450 AM	Affiliate
Dover–New Phila.	Ohio	W265DL	100.9 FM	WJER relay
Fostoria	Ohio	WFOB	1430 AM	Affiliate
Fostoria	Ohio	W289CP	105.7 FM	WFOB relay
Geneva	Ohio	WKKY	104.7 FM	Affiliate
Lima	Ohio	WWSR	93.1 FM	Affiliate
Mansfield	Ohio	WRGM	1440 AM	Affiliate
Mansfield	Ohio	W294CK	106.7 FM	WRGM relay
McConnelsville	Ohio	WJAW-FM	100.9 FM	Affiliate
Millersburg	Ohio	WKLM	95.3 FM	Affiliate
Sandusky	Ohio	WMJK	100.9 FM	Affiliate
Youngstown	Ohio	WNCD	93.3 FM	Affiliate
Erie	Pennsylvania	WPSE	1450 AM	Affiliate
Erie	Pennsylvania	W296BW	107.1 FM	WPSE relay
Wheeling	West Virginia	WKKX	1600 AM	Affiliate
Wheeling	West Virginia	W251CY	98.1 FM	WKKX relay

=== Spanish-language stations ===
Spanish-language stations as of the 2025 Browns season
Media market	State	Station	Frequency	Network status
Cleveland	Ohio	WJMO	1300 AM	Flagship
Columbus	Ohio	WWLA	103.1 FM	Affiliate
Columbus	Ohio	WWLG	107.1 FM	Affiliate
Lorain	Ohio	WNZN	89.1 FM	Affiliate

=== Network map ===
Cleveland Browns Radio Network stations. Click on each marker to reveal details.; Flagship stations; Affiliates (including translators); Spanish-language stations
