= List of Cleveland Guardians broadcasters =

The Cleveland Guardians are currently heard on the radio via flagship sister stations WTAM (1100 AM and 106.9 FM) and WMMS (100.7 FM), with Tom Hamilton and Jim Rosenhaus comprising the announcing team. While primarily an English-language outlet, WTAM/WMMS sister station WARF (1350 AM) serves as the team's Spanish-language flagship, airing broadcasts of all home games with the announcing team of Rafa Hernández-Brito and Carlos Baerga.

Televised game coverage airs on Guardians TV, which launched for the 2025 season both as a cable network and as a streaming service. Matt Underwood handles play-by-play, Rick Manning is lead analyst (with Chris Gimenez filling in occasionally) and Andre Knott is the field reporter. WKYC channel 3 airs 10 over-the-air simulcasts of Guardians TV-produced games per season.

Years are listed in descending order.

Cleveland Guardians and Cleveland Indians broadcast outlets
Year	Radio	Commentators	TV	Commentators	Cable	Commentators
2026	WTAM; WMMS	Tom Hamilton; Jim Rosenhaus; Pat Tabler	WKYC	Matt Underwood; Rick Manning; Chris Gimenez; Pat Tabler; Jason Kipnis; Andre Knott	Guardians TV	Matt Underwood; Rick Manning; Chris Gimenez; Pat Tabler; Jason Kipnis; Andre Knott
2026	WARF (Spanish)	Rafa Hernández-Brito; Carlos Baerga	WKYC	Matt Underwood; Rick Manning; Chris Gimenez; Pat Tabler; Jason Kipnis; Andre Knott	Guardians TV	Matt Underwood; Rick Manning; Chris Gimenez; Pat Tabler; Jason Kipnis; Andre Knott
2025	WTAM; WMMS	Tom Hamilton; Jim Rosenhaus	WKYC	Matt Underwood; Rick Manning; Andre Knott	Guardians TV	Matt Underwood; Rick Manning; Chris Gimenez; Andre Knott
2025	WARF (Spanish)	Rafa Hernández-Brito; Carlos Baerga	WKYC	Matt Underwood; Rick Manning; Andre Knott	Guardians TV	Matt Underwood; Rick Manning; Chris Gimenez; Andre Knott
2024	WTAM; WMMS	Tom Hamilton; Jim Rosenhaus	WKYC	Matt Underwood; Rick Manning; Andre Knott; Chris Gimenez (select games)	Bally Sports Great Lakes	Matt Underwood; Rick Manning; Andre Knott; Chris Gimenez (select games)
2024	WARF (Spanish)	Rafa Hernández-Brito (Spanish); Carlos Baerga (Spanish)	WKYC	Matt Underwood; Rick Manning; Andre Knott; Chris Gimenez (select games)	Bally Sports Great Lakes	Matt Underwood; Rick Manning; Andre Knott; Chris Gimenez (select games)
2023	WTAM; WMMS	Tom Hamilton; Jim Rosenhaus	WKYC	Matt Underwood; Rick Manning; Andre Knott; Pat Tabler (select games)	Bally Sports Great Lakes	Matt Underwood; Rick Manning; Andre Knott; Pat Tabler (select games); Ellis Burks (select games)
2022	WTAM; WMMS	Tom Hamilton; Jim Rosenhaus	WKYC	Matt Underwood; Rick Manning; Andre Knott	Bally Sports Great Lakes	Matt Underwood; Rick Manning; Andre Knott
2021	WTAM; WMMS	Tom Hamilton; Jim Rosenhaus	WKYC	Matt Underwood; Rick Manning; Andre Knott	Bally Sports Great Lakes	Matt Underwood; Rick Manning; Andre Knott
2020	WTAM; WMMS	Tom Hamilton; Jim Rosenhaus	WKYC	Matt Underwood; Rick Manning; Andre Knott	SportsTime Ohio	Matt Underwood; Rick Manning; Andre Knott
2019	WTAM; WMMS	Tom Hamilton; Jim Rosenhaus	WKYC	Matt Underwood; Rick Manning; Andre Knott	SportsTime Ohio	Matt Underwood; Rick Manning; Andre Knott
2018	WTAM; WMMS	Tom Hamilton; Jim Rosenhaus	WKYC	Matt Underwood; Rick Manning; Andre Knott	SportsTime Ohio	Matt Underwood; Rick Manning; Andre Knott
2017	WTAM; WMMS	Tom Hamilton; Jim Rosenhaus	WKYC	Matt Underwood; Rick Manning; Andre Knott	SportsTime Ohio	Matt Underwood; Rick Manning; Andre Knott
2016	WTAM; WMMS	Tom Hamilton; Jim Rosenhaus	WKYC	Matt Underwood; Rick Manning; Andre Knott	SportsTime Ohio	Matt Underwood; Rick Manning; Andre Knott
2015	WTAM; WMMS	Tom Hamilton; Jim Rosenhaus	WKYC	Matt Underwood; Rick Manning; Andre Knott	SportsTime Ohio	Matt Underwood; Rick Manning; Andre Knott
2014	WTAM; WMMS	Tom Hamilton; Jim Rosenhaus	WKYC	Matt Underwood; Rick Manning; Katie Witham	SportsTime Ohio	Matt Underwood; Rick Manning; Katie Witham
2013	WTAM; WMMS	Tom Hamilton; Jim Rosenhaus	WKYC	Matt Underwood; Rick Manning; Katie Witham	SportsTime Ohio	Matt Underwood; Rick Manning; Katie Witham
2012	WTAM	Tom Hamilton; Jim Rosenhaus	WKYC	Matt Underwood; Rick Manning; Al Pawlowski; Katie Witham	SportsTime Ohio	Matt Underwood; Rick Manning; Al Pawlowski; Katie Witham
2011	WTAM	Tom Hamilton; Mike Hegan; Jim Rosenhaus	WKYC	Matt Underwood; Rick Manning; Al Pawlowski; Mike Hargrove; Katie Witham	SportsTime Ohio	Matt Underwood; Rick Manning; Al Pawlowski; Mike Hargrove; Katie Witham
2010	WTAM	Tom Hamilton; Mike Hegan; Jim Rosenhaus	WKYC	Matt Underwood; Rick Manning; Al Pawlowski	SportsTime Ohio	Matt Underwood; Rick Manning; Al Pawlowski
2009	WTAM	Tom Hamilton; Mike Hegan	WKYC	Matt Underwood; Rick Manning	SportsTime Ohio	Matt Underwood; Rick Manning; Al Pawlowski
2008	WTAM	Tom Hamilton; Mike Hegan	WKYC	Jim Donovan; Rick Manning	SportsTime Ohio	Matt Underwood; Rick Manning
2007	WTAM	Tom Hamilton; Mike Hegan	WKYC	Jim Donovan; Rick Manning	SportsTime Ohio	Matt Underwood; Rick Manning; Brian Anderson
2006	WTAM	Tom Hamilton; Matt Underwood; Mike Hegan	WKYC	Jim Donovan; Rick Manning; Mike Hegan	SportsTime Ohio	John Sanders; Rick Manning; Mike Hegan
2005	WTAM	Tom Hamilton; Matt Underwood; Mike Hegan	—N/a	—N/a	FSN Ohio	John Sanders; Rick Manning; Mike Hegan
2004	WTAM	Tom Hamilton; Matt Underwood; Mike Hegan	—N/a	—N/a	FSN Ohio	John Sanders; Rick Manning; Mike Hegan
2003	WTAM	Tom Hamilton; Matt Underwood; Mike Hegan	—N/a	—N/a	FSN Ohio	John Sanders; Rick Manning; Mike Hegan
2002	WTAM	Tom Hamilton; Matt Underwood; Mike Hegan	—N/a	—N/a	FSN Ohio	John Sanders; Rick Manning; Mike Hegan
2001	WTAM	Tom Hamilton; Matt Underwood; Mike Hegan	WUAB	Jack Corrigan; Mike Hegan	FSN Ohio	John Sanders; Rick Manning
2000	WTAM	Tom Hamilton; Matt Underwood; Mike Hegan	WUAB	Jack Corrigan; Mike Hegan	FSN Ohio	John Sanders; Rick Manning
1999	WTAM	Tom Hamilton; Dave Nelson; Mike Hegan	WUAB	Jack Corrigan; Mike Hegan	Fox Sports Ohio	John Sanders; Rick Manning
1998	WTAM	Tom Hamilton; Dave Nelson; Mike Hegan	WUAB	Jack Corrigan; Mike Hegan	Fox Sports Ohio	John Sanders; Rick Manning
1997	WKNR (Note: WGAR became WKNR in 1990; currently home to WHKW.)	Herb Score; Tom Hamilton	WUAB	Jack Corrigan; Mike Hegan	SportsChannel Ohio	John Sanders; Rick Manning
1996	WKNR	Herb Score; Tom Hamilton	WUAB	Jack Corrigan; Mike Hegan	SportsChannel Ohio	John Sanders; Rick Manning
1995	WKNR	Herb Score; Tom Hamilton	WUAB	Jack Corrigan; Mike Hegan	SportsChannel Ohio	John Sanders; Rick Manning
1994	WKNR	Herb Score; Tom Hamilton	WUAB	Jack Corrigan; Mike Hegan	SportsChannel Ohio	John Sanders; Rick Manning
1993	WKNR	Herb Score; Tom Hamilton	WUAB	Jack Corrigan; Mike Hegan	SportsChannel Ohio	John Sanders; Rick Manning
1992	WKNR	Herb Score; Tom Hamilton	WUAB	Jack Corrigan; Mike Hegan	SportsChannel Ohio	John Sanders; Rick Manning
1991	WWWE (Note: WTAM became KYW in 1956, WKYC in 1965, WWWE in 1972 and reverted to the WTAM calls in 1996.)	Herb Score; Tom Hamilton	WUAB	Jack Corrigan; Mike Hegan	SportsChannel Ohio	John Sanders; Rick Manning
1990	WWWE	Herb Score; Tom Hamilton	WUAB	Jack Corrigan; Mike Hegan	SportsChannel Ohio	Dan Coughlin; Rick Manning
1989	WWWE	Herb Score; Paul Olden	WUAB	Jack Corrigan; Mike Hegan	—N/a	—N/a
1988	WWWE	Herb Score; Paul Olden	WUAB	Jack Corrigan; Steve Lamar	—N/a	—N/a
1987	WWWE	Herb Score; Steve Lamar	WUAB	Jack Corrigan; Joe Tait	—N/a	—N/a
1986	WWWE	Herb Score; Steve Lamar	WUAB	Jack Corrigan; Joe Tait	—N/a	—N/a
1985	WWWE	Herb Score; Steve Lamar	WUAB	Jack Corrigan; Joe Tait	—N/a	—N/a
1984	WWWE	Herb Score; Nev Chandler	WUAB	Reggie Rucker; Joe Tait	—N/a	—N/a
1983	WWWE	Herb Score; Nev Chandler	WUAB	Reggie Rucker; Joe Tait	Sports Ex	Bob Feller; Jack Corrigan; Denny Schreiner
1982	WWWE	Herb Score; Nev Chandler	WUAB	Bruce Drennan; Joe Tait	Ten TV	Joe Castiglione; Bob Feller
1981	WWWE	Herb Score; Nev Chandler	WUAB	Bruce Drennan; Joe Tait	—N/a	—N/a
1980	WWWE	Herb Score; Nev Chandler	WUAB	Bruce Drennan; Joe Tait	—N/a	—N/a
1979	WWWE	Herb Score; Joe Tait	WJKW (Note: WXEL-TV became WJW-TV in 1955, WJKW in 1977, back to WJW-TV in 1985 and WJW in 1998.)	Joe Castiglione; Fred McLeod	—N/a	—N/a
1978	WWWE	Herb Score; Joe Tait	WJKW	Jim Mueller; Eddie Doucette	—N/a	—N/a
1977	WWWE	Herb Score; Joe Tait	WJW-TV	Rocky Colavito; Bob Brown (Note: Bob Brown replaced Rocky Colavito mid-season.); Herb Score; Joe Tait	—N/a	—N/a
1976	WWWE	Herb Score; Joe Tait	WJW-TV	Harry Jones; Mudcat Grant	—N/a	—N/a
1975	WWWE	Herb Score; Joe Tait	WJW-TV	Harry Jones; Mudcat Grant	—N/a	—N/a
1974	WWWE	Herb Score; Joe Tait	WJW-TV	Harry Jones; Mudcat Grant	—N/a	—N/a
1973	WWWE	Herb Score; Joe Tait	WJW-TV	Harry Jones; Mudcat Grant	—N/a	—N/a
1972	WERE (Note: WERE became WJMO in 2007.)	Herb Score; Bob Neal	WJW-TV	Harry Jones; Rocky Colavito	—N/a	—N/a
1971	WERE	Herb Score; Bob Neal	WJW-TV	Harry Jones; Dave Martin	—N/a	—N/a
1970	WERE	Herb Score; Bob Neal	WJW-TV	Harry Jones; Dave Martin	—N/a	—N/a
1969	WERE	Herb Score; Bob Neal	WJW-TV	Harry Jones; Dave Martin	—N/a	—N/a
1968	WERE	Herb Score; Bob Neal	WJW-TV	Harry Jones; Mel Allen	—N/a	—N/a
1967	WERE	Jimmy Dudley; Bob Neal	WJW-TV	Harry Jones; Herb Score	—N/a	—N/a
1966	WERE	Jimmy Dudley; Bob Neal	WJW-TV	Harry Jones; Herb Score	—N/a	—N/a
1965	WERE	Jimmy Dudley; Bob Neal	WJW-TV	Harry Jones; Herb Score	—N/a	—N/a
1964	WERE	Jimmy Dudley; Bob Neal	WJW-TV	Harry Jones; Herb Score	—N/a	—N/a
1963	WERE	Jimmy Dudley; Harry Jones	WJW-TV	Ken Coleman; Bob Neal	—N/a	—N/a
1962	WERE	Jimmy Dudley; Harry Jones	WJW-TV	Ken Coleman; Bob Neal	—N/a	—N/a
1961	WERE	Jimmy Dudley; Harry Jones	WJW-TV	Ken Coleman; Bob Neal	—N/a	—N/a
1960	WERE	Jimmy Dudley; Bob Neal	WEWS	Ken Coleman; Bill McColgan	—N/a	—N/a
1959	WERE	Jimmy Dudley; Bob Neal	WEWS	Ken Coleman; Bill McColgan	—N/a	—N/a
1958	WERE	Jimmy Dudley; Bob Neal	WEWS	Ken Coleman; Bill McColgan	—N/a	—N/a
1957	WERE	Jimmy Dudley; Bob Neal	WEWS	Ken Coleman; Jim Britt	—N/a	—N/a
1956	WERE	Jimmy Dudley; Tom Manning	WEWS	Ken Coleman; Jim Britt	—N/a	—N/a
1955	WERE	Jimmy Dudley; Ed Edwards	WXEL	Ken Coleman; Jim Britt	—N/a	—N/a
1954	WERE	Jimmy Dudley; Ed Edwards	WXEL	Ken Coleman; Jim Britt	—N/a	—N/a
1953	WERE	Jimmy Dudley; Jack Graney	WXEL	Bob Neal; Red Jones	—N/a	—N/a
1952	WERE	Jimmy Dudley; Jack Graney	WXEL	Bob Neal; Red Jones	—N/a	—N/a
1951	WERE	Jimmy Dudley; Jack Graney	WXEL	Hal Newell	—N/a	—N/a
1950	WERE	Jimmy Dudley; Jack Graney	WXEL	Jimmy Dudley; Jack Graney	—N/a	—N/a
1949	WJW (Note: WJW became WRMR in 1985 and WKNR in 2001.)	Jimmy Dudley; Jack Graney	WEWS	Bob Neal; Tris Speaker	—N/a	—N/a
1948	WJW; WJW-FM (Note: The majority of regular season games in 1948 originated over WJW-FM, which in turn fed a statewide network of stations. WJW had arranged ABC Radio commitments prior to the season's start under the presumption that afternoon games would start at 3 p.m., but start times were abruptly moved to 2 p.m. with little advance notice. WJW carried the one-game playoff against the Boston Red Sox after team owner Bill Veeck prohibited WHK from carrying Mutual's nationwide network coverage. WJW carried all games during the 1949 season after resolving all network commitments.)	Jimmy Dudley; Jack Graney	WEWS	Van Patrick	—N/a	—N/a
1947	WGAR	Jack Graney	—N/a	—N/a	—N/a	—N/a

Cleveland Indians broadcast outlets prior to 1947
Year	Radio	Commentators	Source(s)
June 28, 1946 (Note: Four radio stations simultaneously covered the June 28, 1946, Indians game, which occurred shortly after the purchase of the team by Bill Veeck.)	WGAR (Note: WGAR would carry Indians play-by-play for the remainder of the season.)	Jack Graney; Bob Neal	
June 28, 1946	WJW	Earl Harper	
June 28, 1946	WHK	Don Campbell	
June 28, 1946	WTAM	Tom Manning	
1945	n/a	no games covered	
1944 (Note: Game coverage began on May 5, 1944, due to difficulty securing a sponsorship.)	WCLE (Note: A daytime-only station, WCLE broadcast all afternoon games while co-owned WHK carried all night games. WCLE relocated to Akron, Ohio, as WHKK after the 1944 season ended.); WHK	Jack Graney; Lew Henry	
1943	WCLE; WHK	Jack Graney; Lew Henry	
1942	WCLE; WHK	Jack Graney; Lew Henry	
1941	WCLE; WHK	Jack Graney; Pinky Hunter	
1940	WCLE; WHK	Jack Graney; Pinky Hunter	
1939	WCLE	Jack Graney; Pinky Hunter	
1938	WCLE	Jack Graney; Pinky Hunter	
1937	WHK	Jack Graney	
1936	WHK	Jack Graney	
1935	WHK	Jack Graney	
1934	WHK	Jack Graney	
1933	WHK	Jack Graney; Earl Harper	
1932	WHK	Ellis Van der Pyl; Jack Graney (Note: Jack Graney replaced Ellis Vander Pyl as play-by-play voice for WHK several games into the 1932 season.)	
1929–1931	WTAM	Tom Manning	(Note: Select home games were only covered by WTAM from 1929 to 1931, as Tom Manning also served as a field announcer at League Park.)

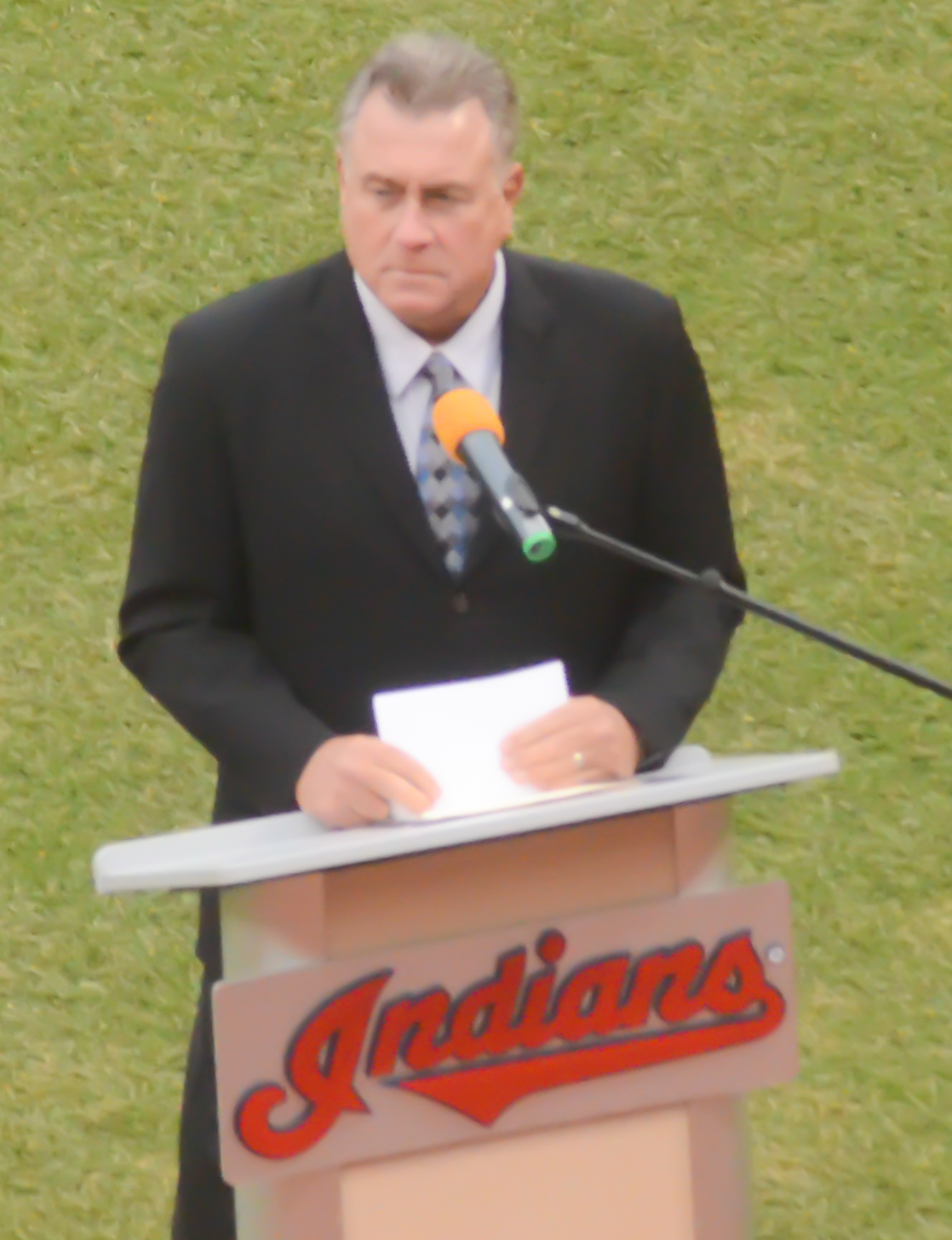
Tom Hamilton, lead Guardians radio announcer since 1998 and an announcer for the team since 1990.

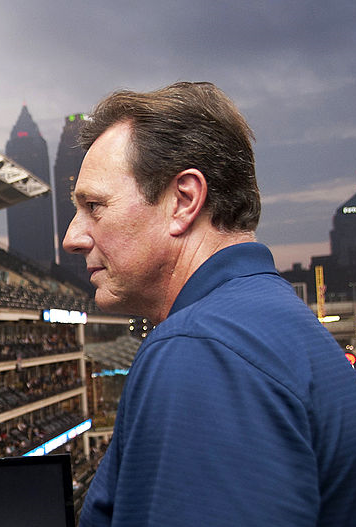
Former Cleveland outfielder Rick Manning, Guardians TV color analyst since 1990.

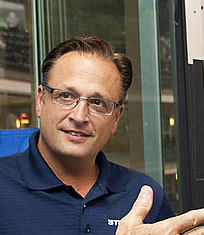
Matt Underwood, a member of the Guardians broadcast team in both radio and TV since 2000.

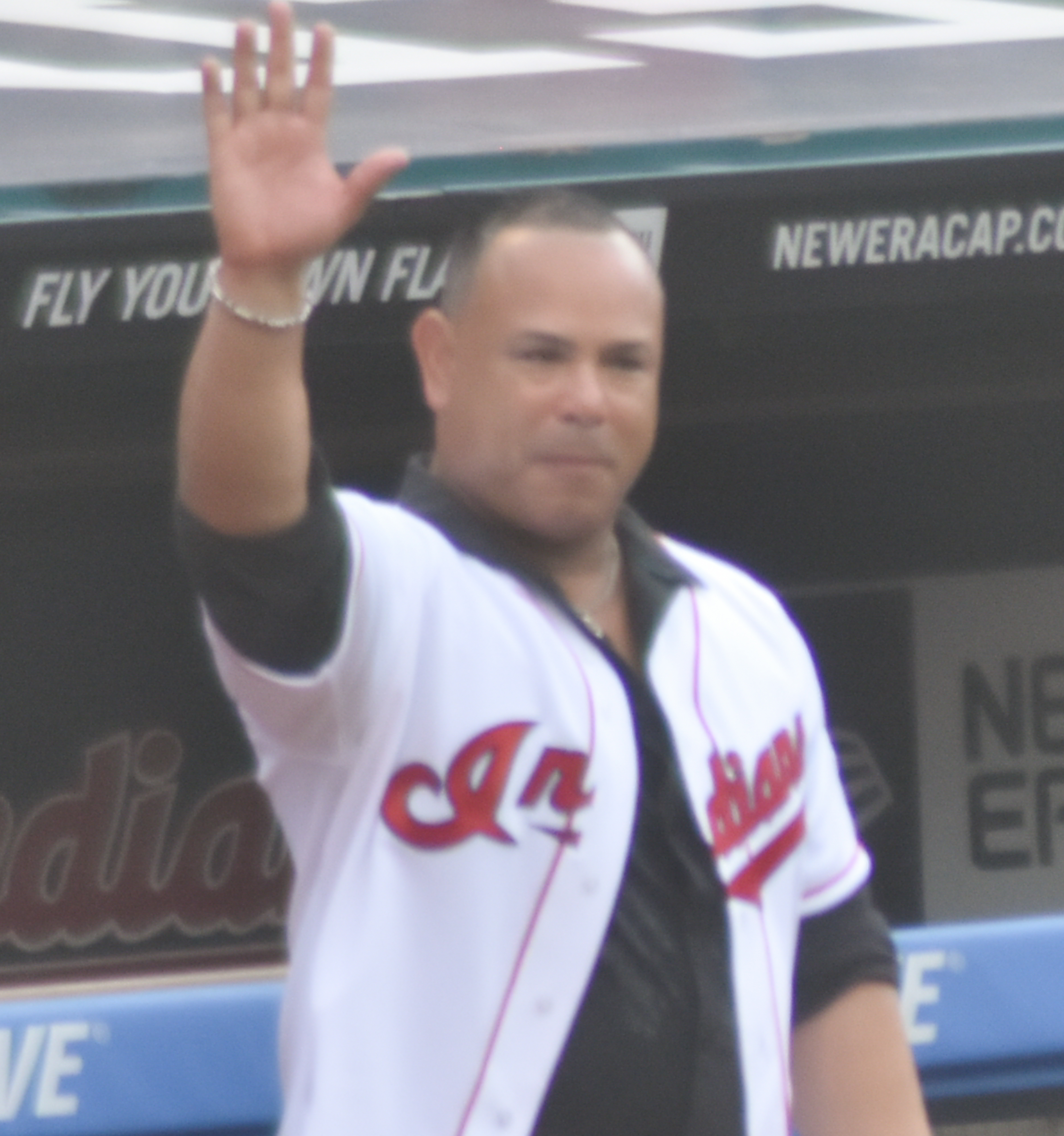
Former Cleveland infielder Carlos Baerga, Guardians Spanish radio analyst since 2024.

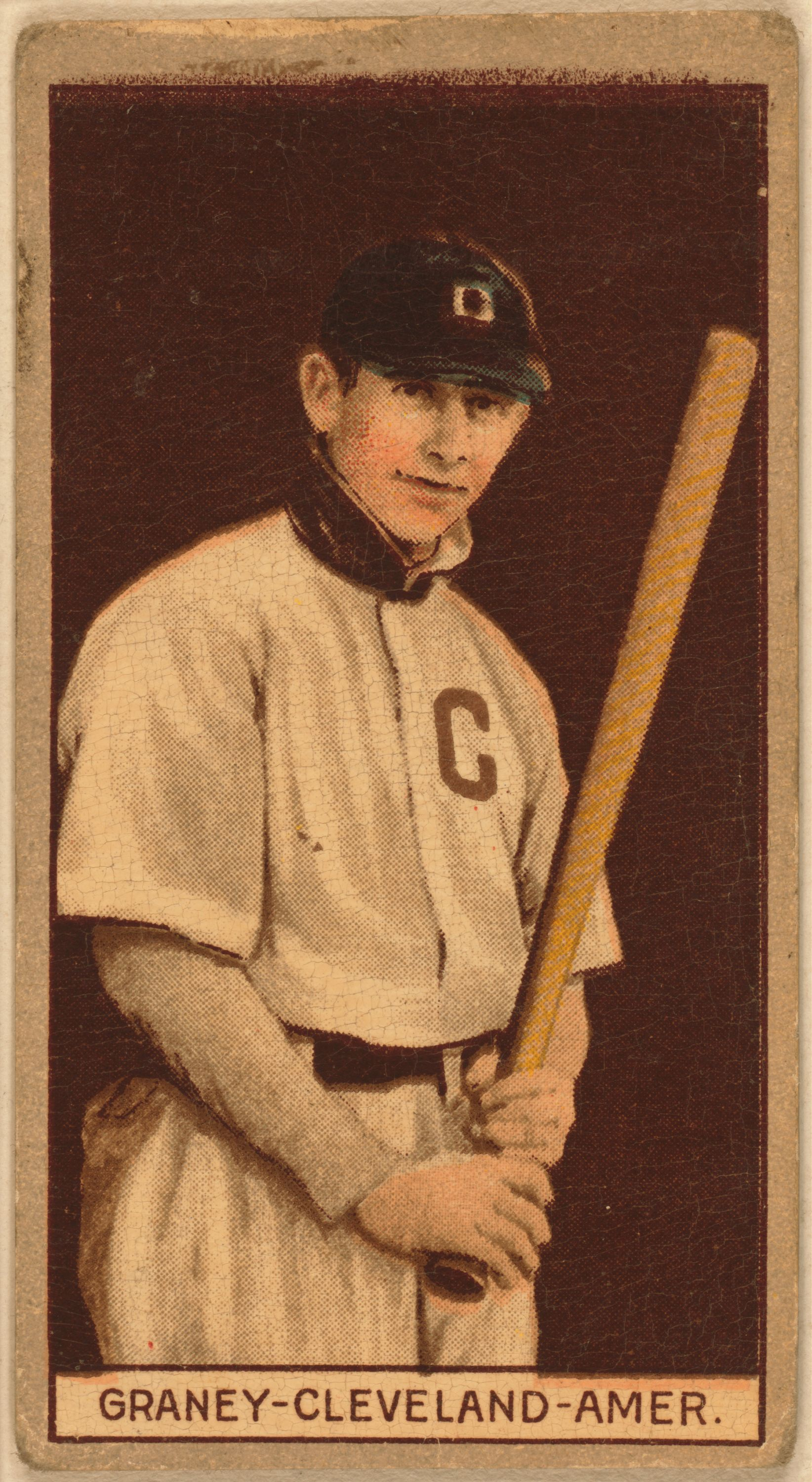
Former Cleveland player Jack Graney was the team's lead announcer from 1932 to 1953.

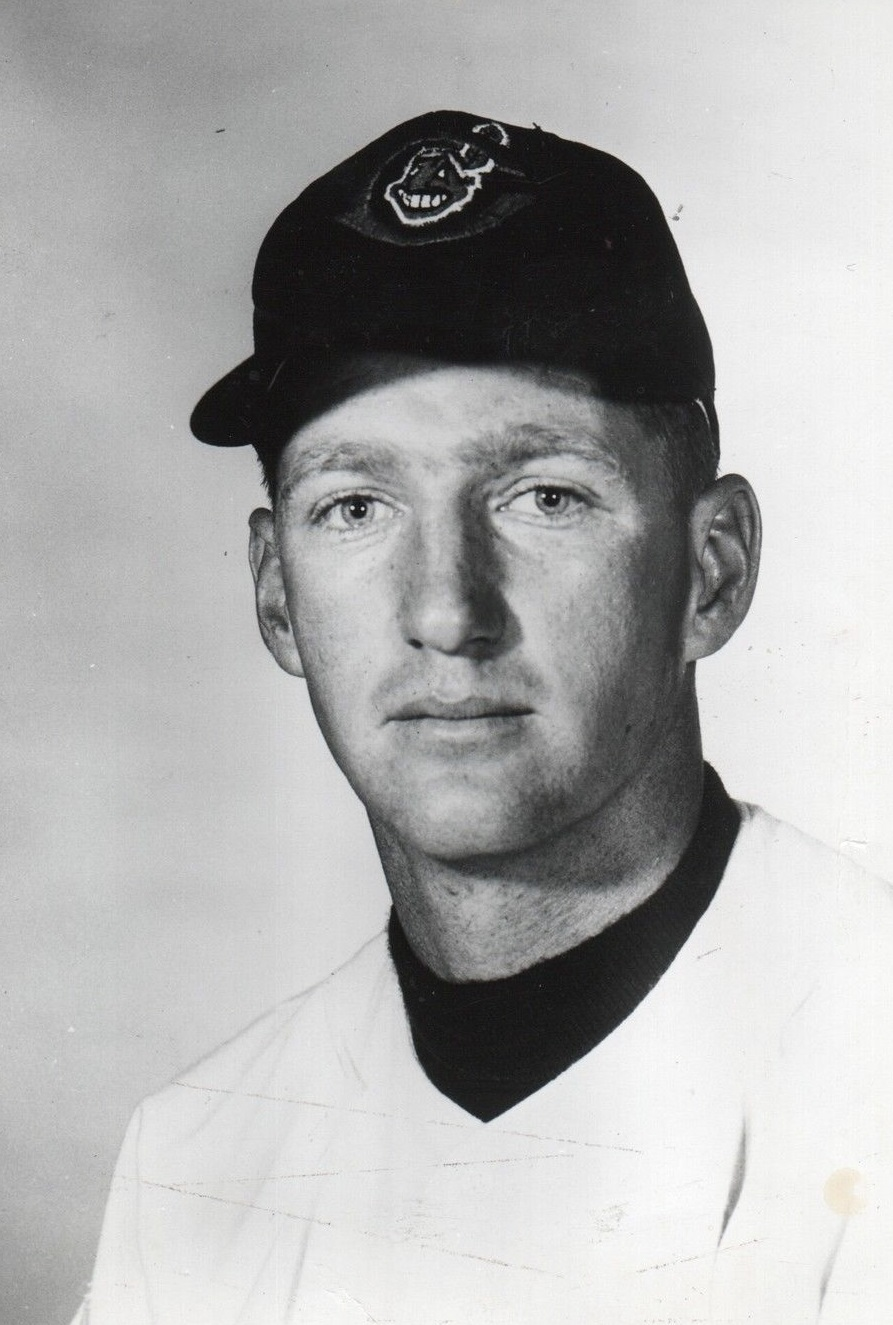
Former Cleveland pitcher Herb Score, who was part of the then Indians broadcast team in both radio and TV from 1964 to 1997.

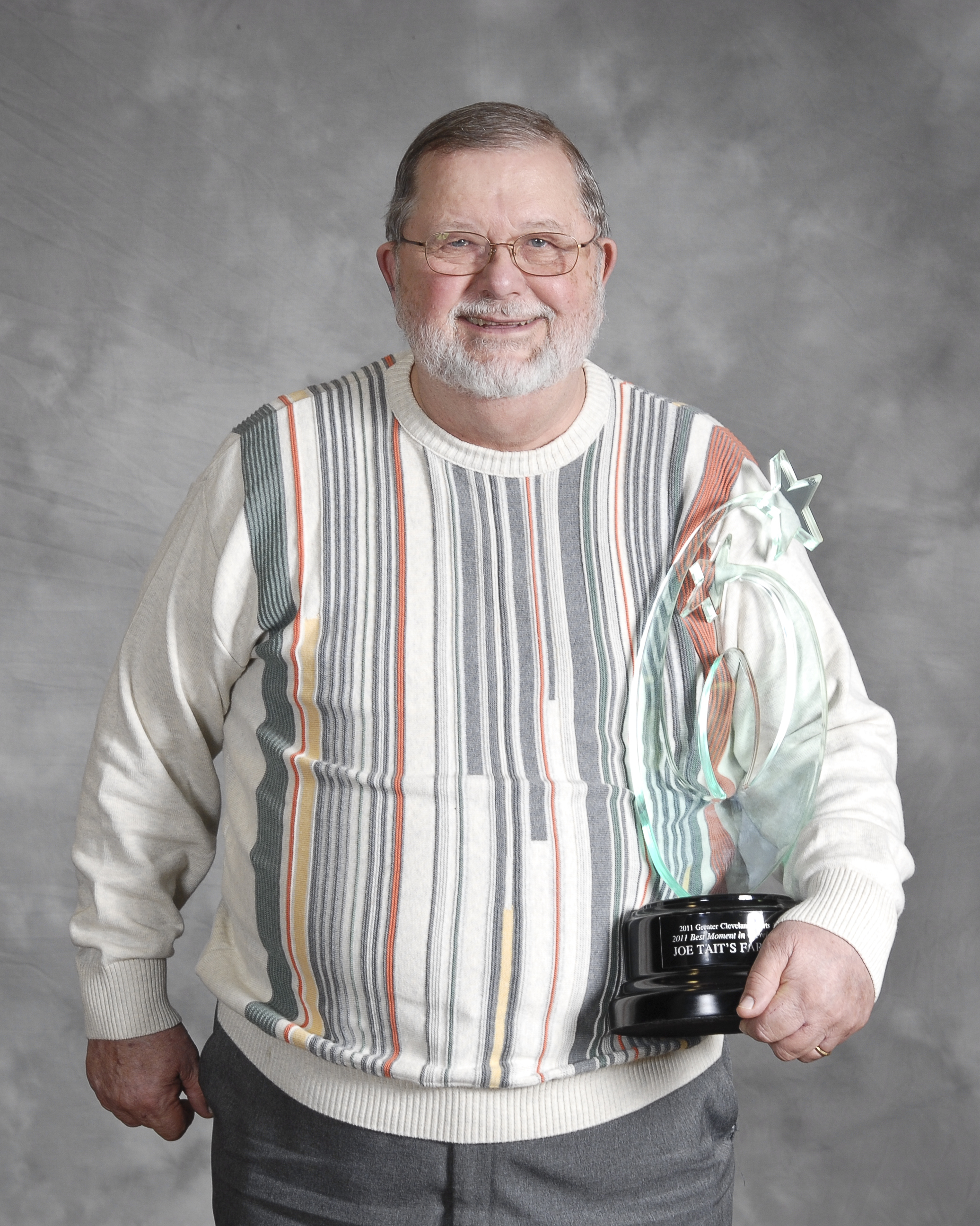
Joe Tait, a member of the Indians broadcast team in radio and TV from 1973 to 1987.

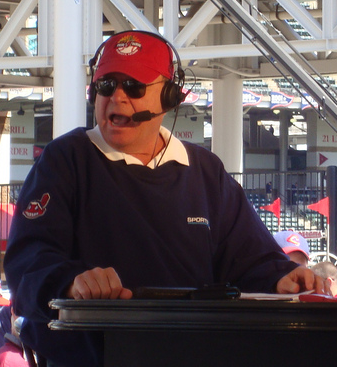
Bruce Drennan, a member of the Indians broadcast team from 1980 to 1982.

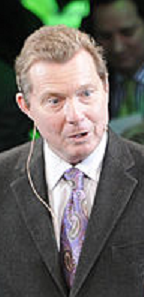
Jim Donovan, a member of the Indians broadcast team from 2006 to 2008.

== Notes ==
- Gold shading indicates championship season.
