= Michael Reghi =

American sports announcer (born 1953)

Michael Joseph Reghi (pronounced REH-guy) (born June 5, 1953) is an American television play-by-play announcer and radio sports talk show host. He was the television play-by-play announcer for the Baltimore Orioles of Major League Baseball from 1997 to 2004, as well as the Cleveland Cavaliers of the National Basketball Association from 1993 to 2006. As of 2025 he is the play-by-play television announcer for some Akron Zips sports games carried by ESPN streaming channels. He also called play-by-play for MAC football on ESPN networks, along with select other games.

Reghi also called games for broadcasts of Mid-American Conference football and basketball for the MAC Television Network and SportsTime Ohio.

== Early life ==
Reghi attended Cass Technical High School in Detroit, Michigan, and is a graduate of Arizona State University.

== Early broadcast career ==
Reghi began his career in 1980, when he was hired by WNDH in Napoleon, Ohio as a sports anchor/reporter. In 1982 he was a sports announcer for WLIO(TV), Lima, Ohio. He then briefly went on to (then) WDHO-TV 24 in Toledo, Ohio as a sports anchor (weekends) and reporter, and from 1983 to 1986 worked at Cleveland's WEWS-TV 5 as the weekend sports anchor (working under Cleveland sports media legends Gib Shanley and Nev Chandler). He then moved back to Toledo to become the sports director for WTVG-TV 13 from 1986 to 1991.

In 1991 returned to Cleveland to host a show on WKNR Radio (then at AM 1220) from 1991 to 1993. During this time, Reghi also served a pregame host for both the Cleveland Indians and Cleveland Cavaliers telecasts on Fox Sports Sports Time Ohio (FOXSPORTSSTO)

== 1993-2014 ==
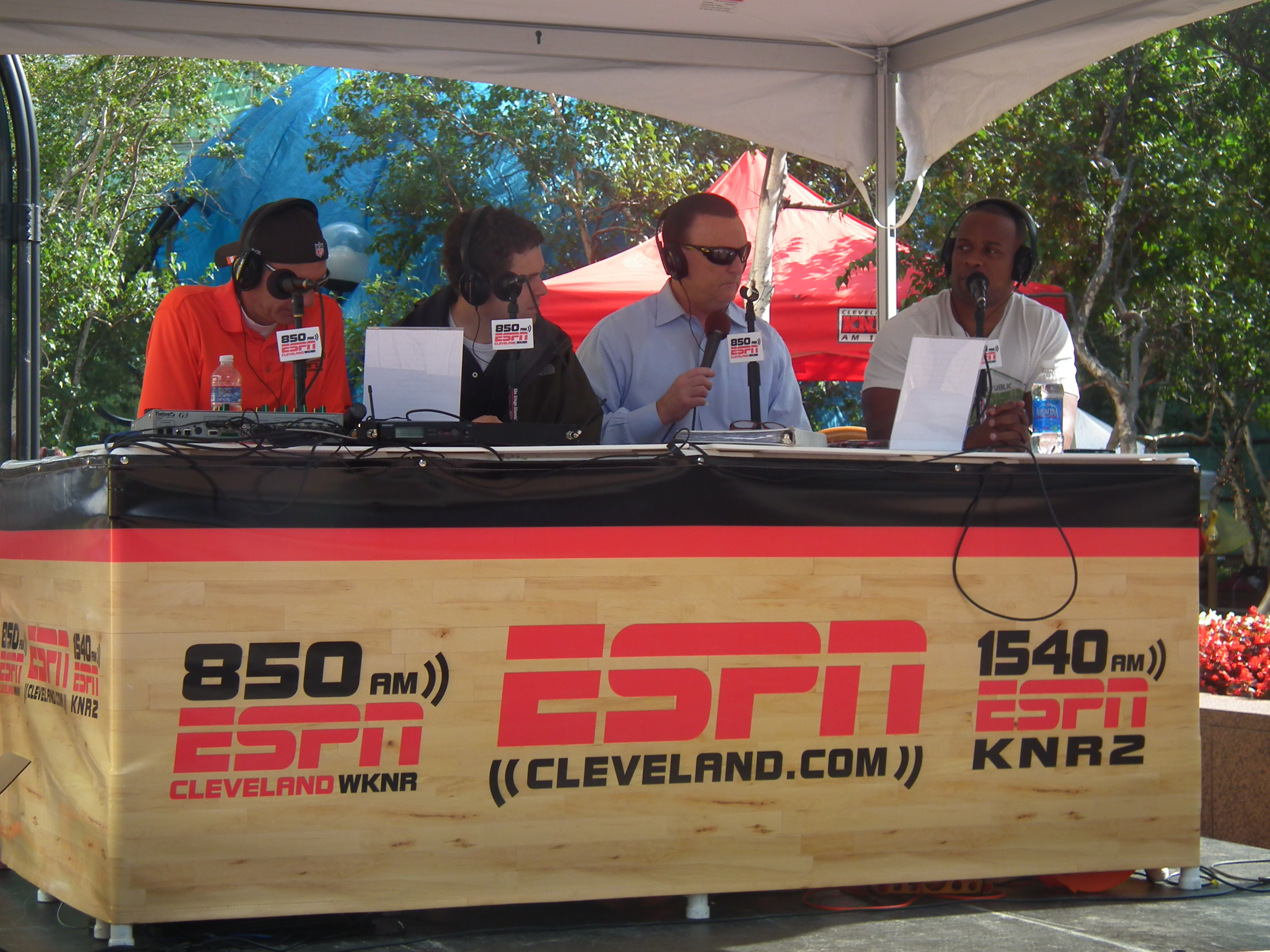
Reghi (second from right) during a 2011 remote broadcast for WKNR

From 1993 to 2006, Reghi was the television play by play voice for the Cleveland Cavaliers. He succeeded Mel Proctor in a similar capacity with the Baltimore Orioles on Home Team Sports (HTS) beginning with the 1997 season. His seven years calling Orioles games on television ended prior to the 2004 campaign when his contract was not renewed by Comcast SportsNet Mid-Atlantic (HTS had rebranded on April 4, 2001). He was replaced by Jim Hunter and Fred Manfra.

He continued to work with FS Ohio as an announcer for MAC Basketball, and with ESPN Plus for MAC football until 2010, when the MAC television contract was picked up by SportsTime Ohio (STO). Reghi was then quickly signed by STO to continue his announcing duties. Reghi also hosts a live Cleveland Browns postgame show on STO.

During the 2007 (final) season of the now defunct NFL Europe (subsequently renamed NFL Europa), Reghi called several games for the NFL Network.

Reghi also called games for the FIBA Americas Championship 2007 that aired on NBA TV, and in 2008, he did play by play for the College Basketball Invitational on Fox College Sports and for the Cleveland Gladiators arena football team on FS Ohio.

He called Cleveland Browns preseason games on the radio, starting in 2013, when Jim Donovan calls Browns preseason on television.

Reghi is a substitute host on Cleveland Browns Daily, a radio show produced by the team.

== STO ==
In 2012, Reghi accepted the role to host Browns Overtime, that immediately aired after every Browns game during the 2012 and will air again after every 2013 Browns game.

Reghi is a substitute for the show All Bets Are Off With Bruce Drennan and has filled in for Bruce Drennan this year consecutive times.

== WKNR ==
From 2007 to 2013, Reghi was back at WKNR, hosting various programs.

Reghi also hosted pre and postgame coverage of Washington Wizards home basketball games on Comcast SportsNet Washington.

In August 2013, Reghi was let go from his night show shift, as were Kenny Roda, Will Burge and TJ Zuppe.

== Signature calls ==
- See you later! - after an Orioles home run
- Flight #23 taking off! - when LeBron James scored on a fast break slam dunk
- Bang, Bang, Bang! - when a Cavalier (especially LeBron James) made a last second shot to give the Cavs the win.
- And you can book this one for the Cavaliers/Orioles! - when either of those teams secured the win for that game.

== Personal life ==
Reghi has a son named Cal (born 2002).

Michael is a resident of Westlake, Ohio.
