= Rosenhaus =

Rosenhaus is a surname. Notable people with the surname include:

- Drew Rosenhaus (born 1966), American sports agent
- Jim Rosenhaus (born 1964), American radio broadcaster
