= Tom Hamilton (sportscaster) =

American sportscaster (born 1954)

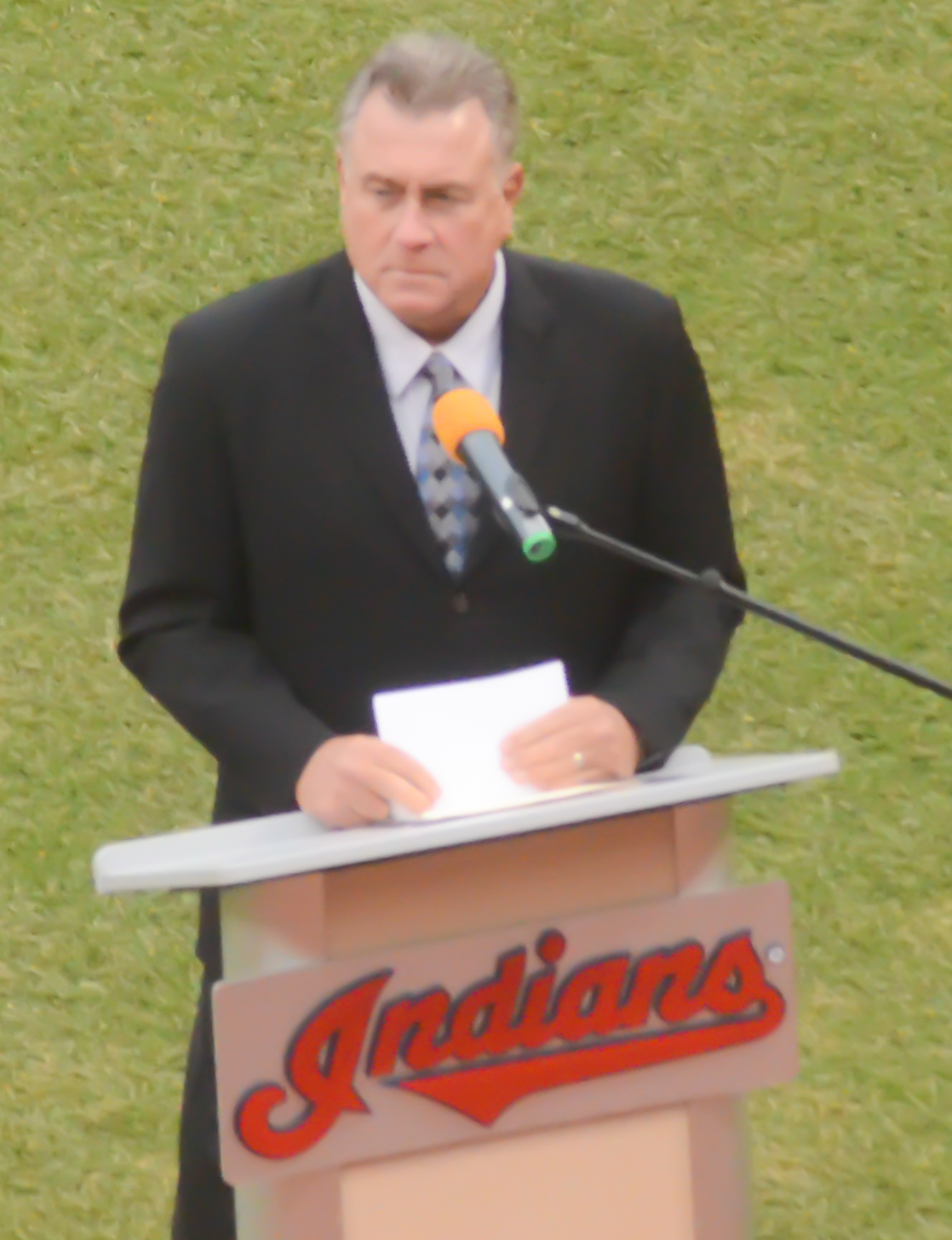
- Hamilton in 2014
- Born: August 19, 1954 (age 72); Waterloo, Wisconsin, U.S.
- Children: 4
- Awards: Ford C. Frick Award (2025)
- Sports commentary career
- Team: Cleveland Indians/Guardians (1990–present)
- Genre: Play-by-play
- Sports: Major League Baseball; College basketball

Tom Hamilton (born August 19, 1954) is an American sportscaster, primarily known as the chief radio play-by-play announcer for the Cleveland Guardians/Indians of Major League Baseball for 35 years. He is the recipient of the 2025 Ford C. Frick Award from the National Baseball Hall of Fame.

== Career ==
Hamilton joined the then- Indians Radio Network for the 1990 season, after spending three years in the booth for the then AAA affiliate of the New York Yankees, the Columbus Clippers.

=== Cleveland Indians/Guardians ===
Hamilton was paired with Indians legend Herb Score until 1997, when Score retired after 30 seasons. Hamilton became chief play by play announcer in the 1998 season, a position he still holds today. Because of his longevity and popularity, he is now considered to be the "voice of the Tribe". After the Indians were renamed to the Guardians, he has also been referred to as the "voice of the Guardians".

Over his career, Hamilton has called over 5,000 games, including three World Series (1995, 1997 and 2016).

On August 5, 2023, Hamilton received praise for his energetic call of a bench-clearing brawl between the Guardians and Chicago White Sox.

=== Other Work ===
Hamilton also called college basketball games in the offseason (usually Ohio State games) for ESPN Plus, and Big Ten Network for 25 years.

== Broadcasting associates with the Indians/Guardians ==
- Herb Score, 1990–1997
- Mike Hegan, 1998–2011
- Dave Nelson, 1998–1999*
- Matt Underwood, 2000–2006*
- Jim Rosenhaus, 2010–present*

(*) - Nelson, and later Underwood joined Hamilton and Hegan in a three-man booth from 1998 to 2007, when the Indians then went to a two-man booth. Rosenhaus, Hamilton and Hegan formed a three-man team for the 2010 and 2011 seasons.

== Broadcasting credits ==
(all pre-Indians/Guardians)

- University of Wisconsin–Madison—football games
- ABC Radio
- Appleton Foxes—minor league baseball games
- University of Colorado—basketball games
- Columbus Clippers—minor league baseball games

== Signature calls ==
- "And we're underway at the corner of Carnegie and Ontario!" - after the first pitch of a Guardians home game (during away games, Hamilton will usually say "And we're underway at [opposing team's ballpark or city]")
- "STRIKE THREE CALLED!" - after a Guardians pitcher strikes out an opposing batter looking
- "Swing and a drive, waaaay back, and gone!!" or "Swung on and belted, to deep ______ (left/center/right), awaaaay back, and outta here!!" - for a Guardians home run
- "Swiiiing and a miss, he tried to hit that one to Euclid / into Lake Erie." - when a batter swings really hard but misses (for away games, Hamilton will use the name of a nearby suburb or neighborhood in the home city)
- "A SWING and a miss!" - for a swinging strikeout by a Guardians pitcher
- "Ballgame!" - after the final out of a Guardians win
- "DOWN GOES ANDERSON! DOWN GOES ANDERSON!" - during an August 5, 2023, brawl between the Guardians and Chicago White Sox when Cleveland's José Ramírez knocked Chicago's Tim Anderson down with a right hook.
- "Cleveland, you will have an October to Remember!" - the final call of every game in which the Indians/Guardians have clinched a playoff spot since 1995.
- "Swung on! Hit high, hit deep to left. THERE SHE GOES!...HOW ABOUT THAT? A walk-off 2-run home run to the bleachers in left by David Fry! And the magical 2024 season is NOT. DONE. BY ANY MEANS!" - Hamilton's call of David Fry's walk-off home run in Game 3 of the 2024 ALCS.

== Personal life ==
Hamilton resides in Avon Lake, Ohio, with his wife and four children. One son, Nick, was drafted by the Cleveland Indians in the 35th round in the 2012 MLB draft out of Kent State University.

Another son, Brad, works as a reporter for Cleveland Fox affiliate WJW-TV 8.

== Books ==
- Glory Days in Tribe Town: The Cleveland Indians and Jacobs Field 1994–1997, (Co-Written with Terry Pluto), 2014 ISBN 978-1-938441-35-6

== Awards and honors ==
- Seven-time NSSA Ohio Sportscaster of the Year (1997, 2000, 2001, 2004, 2006, 2013, 2017)
- 2009 inductee - Cleveland Association of Broadcasters Hall of Fame
- 2015 Lifetime Achievement Award - Greater Cleveland Sports Awards
- Greater Cleveland Sports Hall of Fame (class of 2022)
- 2025 Ford C. Frick Award - National Baseball Hall of Fame and Museum
