= Dan Coughlin (sportscaster) =

American journalist (1938–2024)

- Born: Daniel Francis Coughlin; September 17, 1938; Cleveland, Ohio, U.S.
- Died: October 6, 2024 (aged 86)
- Occupation(s): Newspaper sportswriter television sportscaster
- Awards: 1976 Ohio Sportswriter of the Year; Two-time Lower Great Lakes Emmy Award winner
- Website: Coughlin's personal blog

Daniel Francis Coughlin (1938 – October 6, 2024) was an American sports anchor and reporter for WJW Fox 8 in Cleveland, author, and sports writer for the Cleveland Plain Dealer.

== Early life ==
Coughlin was born in 1938 and lived in the Collinwood neighborhood on Cleveland's east side until 1941, when his parents moved to a home on the city's west side near St. Ignatius High School. A time later, Coughlin's family moved again to suburban Lakewood, Ohio, where he attended St. Edward High School, graduating in 1956. Coughlin later served a two-year stint in the U.S. Army in the First Armored Division.

== Career ==
=== Newspapers ===
Soon after leaving military service, Coughlin landed his first full-time job in the newspaper business when he became a sports writer for the Cleveland Plain Dealer in 1964. While with the Plain Dealer, Coughlin was recognized for his work by being named Ohio Sportswriter of the Year by the National Sportscasters and Sportswriters Association (NSSA) in 1976, and serving as president of the Cleveland Press Club from 1981-82.

Coughlin left the Plain Dealer in 1982, but worked part-time as a sports writer in later years, writing sports columns for suburban newspapers such as the Elyria Chronicle Telegram, and the Lake County News Herald.

=== Television ===
In 1983, Coughlin switched to television reporting, becoming a sports reporter/fill-in anchor for WJKW (now WJW) TV 8 in Cleveland, where he remained.

For the 1990 baseball season, Coughlin served as a play by play announcer for the Cleveland Indians on the then-new SportsChannel Ohio (now Bally Sports Ohio).

In later years, Coughlin went into semi-retirement, though he still worked part-time at WJW as a co-host of Friday Night Touchdown during high school football season.

=== Author ===
Coughlin wrote four books featuring anecdotes from his career covering the Cleveland sports scene: Pass the Nuts (2011), Crazy, With The Papers to Prove It (2012), Let's Have Another (2015) and Just One More Story (2018).

== Death ==
Coughlin died on October 6, 2024, at the age of 86.

== Awards and honors ==
- 1976 Ohio Sportswriter of the Year (NSSA)
- 1996 inductee, Cleveland Press Club Journalism Hall of Fame
- 2002 Society of Professional Journalists (Cleveland chapter) Distinguished Service Award recipient
- Two-time Lower Great Lakes Emmy Awards recipient (2010 and 2012 as co-host of Friday Night Touchdown) - Sports Program
- 2013 Irish-American Archives Society (IAAS) Walks of Life Award recipient
- 2017 inductee, Greater Cleveland Sports Hall of Fame
