= Jim Rosenhaus =

Radio broadcaster (born 1964)

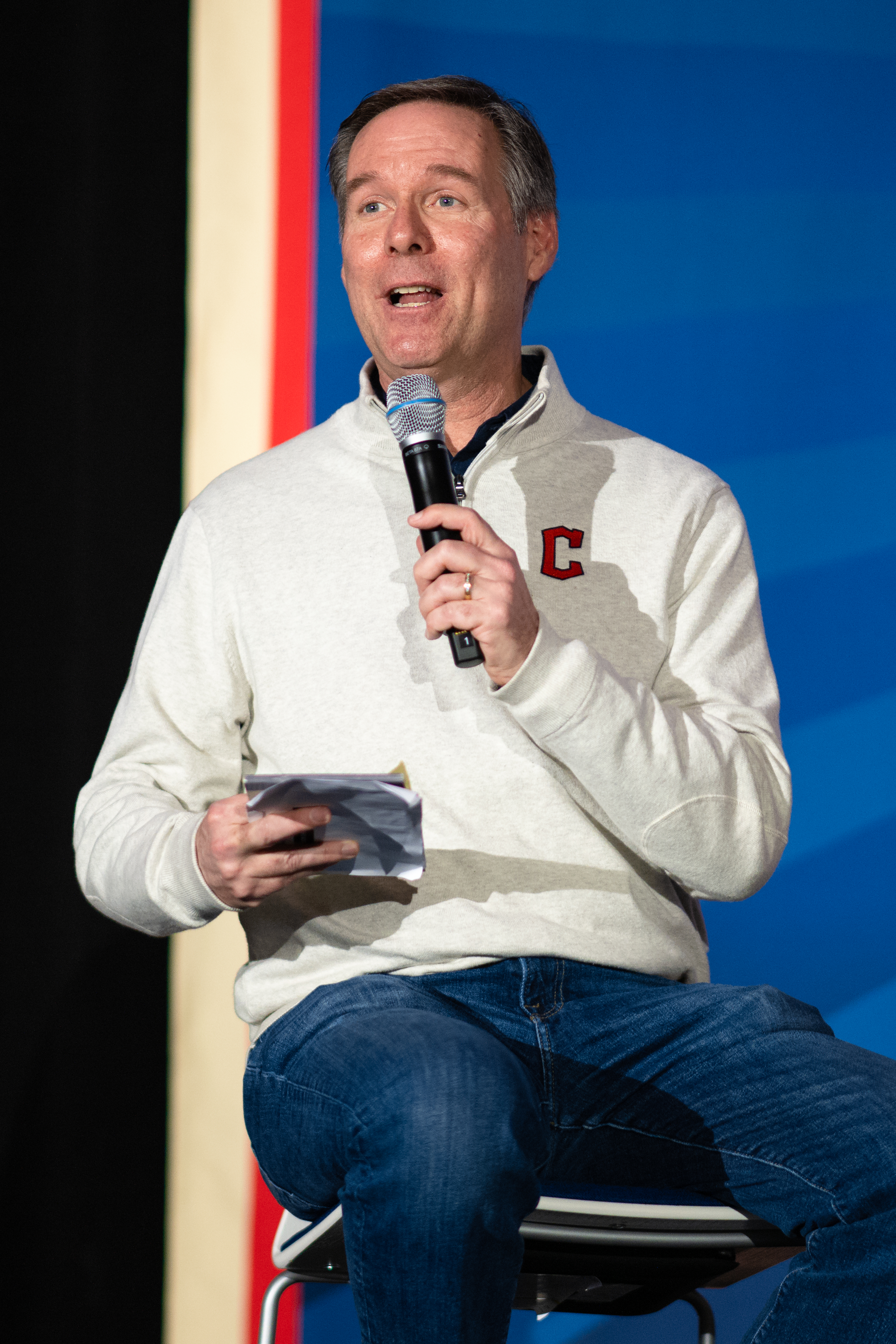
Rosenhaus in 2023

Jim Rosenhaus (born February 25, 1964) is a radio broadcaster for the Cleveland Guardians Major League Baseball team. Rosenhaus also hosts Guardians Warm Up and Guardians Weekly on WTAM.

Rosenhaus joined the Guardians (known as the Indians at the time of joining) in 2007 after spending 11 years as the play-by-play voice of the AAA Buffalo Bisons. Initially serving as the engineer/producer of the radio broadcast, in 2010 he eventually added the role of broadcaster to his responsibilities. In 2012, he became Tom Hamilton's full-time partner following the retirement of Mike Hegan. Rosenhaus serves as the radio pregame host, is the play by play announcer during innings four and five, and does locker room interviews after the game (as well as other behind the scenes work).

With the Bisons, he called 1,628 games (just 44 contests shy of the all-time record for most in team history held by Pete Weber). Rosenhaus is the only broadcaster to call three Bisons championships (1997, 1998, 2004). He also was the play-by-play announcer for the 2002 AAA All-Star Game.

Rosenhaus also served as the voice of the University at Buffalo Bulls men's basketball team for 11 seasons and worked with the Toronto Blue Jays Radio Network, the Wilmington Blue Rocks and the Kinston Indians.

Rosenhaus graduated from Lafayette College in Easton, Pennsylvania where he was an economics major and computer science minor. Rosenhaus also was a runner on the Cross Country and Track teams at Lafayette and broadcast football, basketball, and baseball games for WJRH at Lafayette College.

In 2011, Rosenhaus was inducted into the Buffalo Baseball Hall of Fame along with former Major League Baseball player and American League Manager of the Year (2003) Tony Peña.

Rosenhaus had also called several televised events broadcast on SportsTime Ohio (now Bally Sports Great Lakes) including the Ohio High School Athletic Association football playoffs and high school basketball.

== Broadcasting associates with the Indians/Guardians ==
Jim Rosenhaus has partnered with the following members of the Cleveland Guardians Radio Network (Flagship stations - WTAM 1100 AM/106.9 FM, WMMS 100.7 FM):

- Mike Hegan, 2010–2011
- Tom Hamilton, 2010–present

== See also ==
- List of Cleveland Guardians broadcasters
- List of current Major League Baseball announcers
