= Jim Graner =

- Born: James R. Graner; February 21, 1919; Akron, Ohio, U.S.
- Died: January 15, 1976 (aged 56); Cleveland, Ohio, U.S.
- Occupations: TV sports anchor Radio color commentator
- Employers: 1957–1975: KYW-TV/WKYC; 1955–1960, 1963–1975: Cleveland Browns Radio Network (via stations WGAR, WERE and WHK)
- Spouse: Margaret Graner
- Children: 1

James R. Graner (February 21, 1919 – January 15, 1976) was the weeknight sports anchor for Cleveland NBC affiliate KYW-TV (later WKYC) beginning in 1957. He also served as color commentator for the Cleveland Browns Radio Network, most notably alongside Cleveland sportscaster Gib Shanley.

Graner had operated in both capacities for nearly twenty years when brain cancer took his life in 1976.

== Early life ==
Graner was born in Akron, Ohio, but grew up in its neighboring suburb of Stow. After graduating from Stow High School in 1937, he attended Ohio Wesleyan University, but left after two years to work at a Cleveland railroad office. Graner also served in the U.S. Army during World War II, and upon his return, went into broadcasting as a radio announcer. He later married and had a son, Lou.

== KYW-TV/WKYC Cleveland ==
Jim Graner served as the daily evening sports anchor for Cleveland NBC affiliate KYW-TV (later WKYC) beginning in 1957, working alongside the likes of weathermen Joe Finan, Dick Goddard, and Wally Kinnan. Occasionally, he would also fill in for fellow sportscaster Bob Neal.

Graner was known for his "dry wit" and "unflappable" personality, to the point where his fellow broadcasters would often attempt to shake his on-air persona. During one such instance, weatherman Joe Finan placed a woman wearing a raincoat in front of Graner during one of their nightly broadcasts. As soon as Graner began, the woman took off the raincoat and revealed that she was wearing nothing underneath. Graner remarked: "I had the Browns playing the Indians." Joking aside, Jim Graner was considered "dignified, low-key... the thinking fan's broadcaster." The "silver-haired" and "gentleman" sportscaster with "matinee idol looks" also hosted his own summer series, Golf with the Pros.

Colleagues and viewers were both shocked and saddened by his early death in 1976. Graner's absence was felt for years to come: Channel 3 sports became a "musical chair" over the next decade, as at least six replacements came (among them Don Schroeder, Tom Ryther, Joe Pelligrino, Jim Mueller and Wayland Boot) and went until another "Jim" finally took over — Jim Donovan, who joined the station in 1985.

== Cleveland Browns radio career ==
Graner first served as color commentator for the Cleveland Browns from 1955–1960, working for radio station WGAR (1220 AM) alongside Bill McColgan. He is best remembered, however, for his work alongside Cleveland play-by-play announcer Gib Shanley: the two paired-up as the voices of the Browns radio network from 1963–1974, working for stations WERE (1300 AM) and later WHK. Among their highlights: coverage of the 1964 NFL Championship Game, the last major title won by a professional sports team in Cleveland until 2016. Immediately following Cleveland's upset victory over the Baltimore Colts at Municipal Stadium, Graner was the man on the field who interviewed franchise owner Art Modell (who, ironically, later moved the team to Baltimore in 1995 — much to the ire of Cleveland Browns fans).

Jim Graner is still considered among the greats of Cleveland sports radio. In his memoir, former Cleveland Brown legend Lou Groza lists Graner first among his favorite Cleveland broadcasters. Dick Lebeau — currently the defensive coordinator for the Browns' archrival, the Pittsburgh Steelers — fondly recalls listening to Graner on the radio during his youth in Ohio.

== Death ==
Graner became ill in the spring of 1975; surgery was performed to remove a brain tumor. He was healthy enough to return for radio commentary during six summer exhibition games of the Cleveland Browns, but was unable to continue on through the regular season. By December of that year he had been readmitted to the Cleveland Clinic Hospital. He then fell into a coma and died on January 15, 1976.

The Jim Graner Memorial Pro-Am Golf Tournament was named in his honor; the first of these annual events was held in June 1976 at the Tanglewood Country Club of Chagrin Falls, Ohio and was attended by Cleveland native Bob Hope, among other "well known entertainers." Soon the tournament moved to the Silver Lake Country Club near Graner's hometown of Stow, Ohio.

== Bibliography ==
- Feran, Tom; Heldenfels, R.D. (1999). Cleveland TV Memories. Cleveland, Ohio: Gray & Co. ISBN 978-1-886228-32-0.
- Castiglione, Joe; Lyons, Douglas B. (2004). Broadcast Rites and Sites: I Saw It on the Radio with the Boston Red Sox. Lanham, Maryland: Taylor Trade Pub. ISBN 978-1-58979-081-0.
- Groza, Lou (1996). The Toe: The Lou Groza Story. Cleveland, Ohio: Gray & Co. ISBN 978-1-886228-80-1.
