= Matt Underwood =

American sportscaster (born c. 1968)

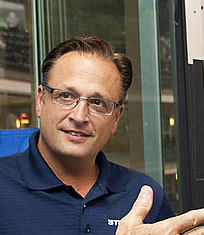
- Occupations: Sportscaster, play-by-play-announcer
- Spouse: Shelley
- Children: 2

Matt Underwood is an American sportscaster currently serving as the television play-by-play announcer for the Cleveland Guardians of Major League Baseball (MLB).

== Broadcasting career ==
Prior to joining the Guardians broadcast team on a full-time basis in 2000, Underwood spent 10 years at WEWS-TV 5 in Cleveland (ABC). Underwood joined WEWS as an associate sports producer after graduating from Baldwin-Wallace College in 1990. In December 1994, Underwood was named as a sports producer/reporter. During this time, he also worked for WKNR Radio (then at 1220 AM) as an update anchor and weekend show host.

A year later he would become the weekend sports anchor at News Channel 5, and in November 1996 he became the station's sports director and weeknight 6 and 11 p.m. sports anchor, a job he held until 2000, when he became a full-time member of the Guardians' broadcasting team (having previously done radio and TV pregame shows for the team as a side job prior to 2000).

Underwood was in the radio booth from 2000–2006, and then switched to TV beginning in 2007. He also has called high school football and college basketball games on Bally Sports Great Lakes during the offseason.

== Personal life ==
Underwood is an Ashland, Ohio native who studied business administration and graduated from Baldwin-Wallace College in 1990. He currently lives in Avon Lake, Ohio with his wife Shelley and their children. Underwood's son, Max, is the bassist for the Cleveland-based metalcore band Midwinter.

== See also ==
- List of Cleveland Guardians broadcasters
