= Jim Mueller =

American sportscaster (1943–2022)

- Born: James F. Mueller; May 23, 1943; Owensboro, Kentucky, U.S.
- Died: August 17, 2022 (aged 79)
- Occupation: Sportscaster
- Years active: c. 1968 – 1995
- Employers: WPTV-TV (c. 1968 – 1971); WHAS-TV (1971–1972); WHAS radio (1971–1972); WTVJ (1972–1974); WJKW (1974–1981); Cleveland Browns radio (1975–1995); WKYC (1981–1987)

James F. Mueller (May 23, 1943 – August 17, 2022) was an American sportscaster. He was a radio announcer for the Cleveland Browns of the National Football League (NFL) from 1975 to 1995, and was a sports anchor on Cleveland TV newscasts through most of the 1970s and 1980s.

== Early life and education ==
Mueller was born on May 23, 1943, in Owensboro, Kentucky. He later moved to Florida and became a reservist in the Marines while playing college football at the University of Florida. He had a training camp stint with the Baltimore Colts of the National Football League (NFL) after college, but it was ended by a severe ankle injury. He also played for a semi-professional team in Orlando, Florida. After his football career, he worked for a time as a commercial airline pilot.

== Broadcasting career ==
In 1968, Mueller became a sports anchor at WPTV-TV in West Palm Beach, Florida. Following three years there, he was hired by WHAS-TV in Louisville, Kentucky, to anchor the 6 p.m. and 11 p.m. sports reports. During this time, he also served as the Louisville Cardinals football announcer on WHAS radio. In March 1972, he was recognized by governor Julian Carroll, who commissioned him a Kentucky Colonel, which is the highest title of honor in the state.

In December 1972, Mueller moved to South Florida and became the noon and weekend sports anchor at WTVJ. He also was a play-by-play commentator for the Miami Hurricanes football team as well as preseason announcer for the Miami Dolphins. In his two years at the station, Mueller did numerous CBS network reports covering golf, auto racing, and other events including the Joe Frazier vs. George Foreman boxing match.

On June 30, 1974, Mueller resigned from WTVJ to become sports director at WJW (renamed WJKW from April 22, 1977, to September 16, 1985), where he worked through 1981. From 1981 to 1987, he was the lead sports anchor at WKYC.

Mueller was named commentator for the Cleveland Browns radio network in 1975, working alongside Gib Shanley. He also occasionally did play-by-play radio announcing for both the Cleveland Cavaliers and Cleveland Indians. In 1985, Mueller became part of the three-man radio crew for the Browns, with Nev Chandler doing play-by-play, Mueller commentary, and Doug Dieken joining Mueller as an analyst. He remained a commentator with Cleveland until the franchise suspended in 1996. Mueller was commentator for some of the most memorable seasons in Browns history, including the 1980 "Kardiac Kids" and the Bernie Kosar era.

When the Browns returned to the NFL in 1999, Mueller was named public address announcer at the Cleveland Browns Stadium.

Mueller also served as the public address announcer at the Michigan International Speedway for 33 years until retiring in 2017. He additionally served as the commercial voice for the Mullinax Ford and Pat O'Brien Chevrolet following his sportscasting career. He also did public address announcing at other NASCAR/ISC owned tracks in the mid-2000s and 2010s until 2018.

Throughout his broadcasting career, Mueller had an impact on many people who went on to have successful sportscasting careers. John Telich, who was mentored by Mueller at WJKW, later said of him: "Jim was a godsend to me when I came to the station in 1980. He introduced me to everybody in town and I mean everyone because Jim was so well connected with athletes, coaches and front office people. Jim was exacting. He cared about the product and wanted to make sure that I, a young ambitious guy, had the same high standards. I will always be grateful for everything he did for me."

== Personal life and death ==
Mueller was a big fan of auto racing, and went as far as to become a Sports Car Club of America (SCCA) driver. He was associated with the Roger Penske organization.

Mueller co-founded the Sports Media Associates of Cleveland and Ohio (SMACO) and was its first president for six years, before being named executive director for life in 1982. For 23 years, he hosted the Jim Mueller SMACO Charity Golf Classic, which raised hundreds of thousands of dollars for various organizations.

Mueller was inducted into the Radio/Television Broadcasters Hall of Fame of Ohio in 2005.

Mueller died on August 17, 2022, at the age of 79. His death was announced by Jim Donovan, his successor as voice of the Cleveland Browns, at the Philadelphia Eagles–Cleveland Browns preseason game.
