= Casey Coleman =

American sportscaster and radio personality (1951-2006)

- Born: March 24, 1951; Cleveland, Ohio
- Died: November 27, 2006 (aged 55); Cleveland, Ohio
- Occupations: TV sports anchor NFL radio announcer
- Parent: Ken Coleman
- Awards: Four-time Lower Great Lakes Emmy Award winner

Kenneth R. "Casey" Coleman Jr. (March 24, 1951 – November 27, 2006) was a sportscaster and radio personality in the Cleveland area for nearly 30 years.

== Early life ==
Coleman was born in Cleveland in 1951 to legendary play-by-play announcer Ken Coleman. The elder Coleman called Cleveland Browns games in the late 1950s and early 1960s, Ohio State football games, as well as the televised games of the Cleveland Indians during roughly the same span. Ken Coleman was best known as the voice of the Boston Red Sox for a generation.

As a youngster, Coleman was a water boy for the Browns and spent his summers in Hiram with the team while his dad served as the team's radio voice.

== Career ==
Coleman began his broadcasting career in Fall River, MA, hosting an evening sports talk show on WSAR 1480 AM. In 1978, he came to Cleveland and hosted a radio sports talk show on WERE 1300 AM (now at 1490 AM), where he ended each broadcast by saying, "I'm rounding third and heading home.", a phrase he would carry over in to his TV career.

From 1984-1996, Coleman worked for WJW TV 8 as the main sports anchor. He was awarded four Cleveland Emmy Awards while at WJW.

Following the death of Browns play-by-play voice Nev Chandler, Coleman became the team's main announcer in 1994, and held that job for the final two seasons of the Art Modell era before Modell moved the team to Baltimore in 1996 and renamed them the Ravens.

Coleman joined WTAM 1100-AM in July 1997, and became a part of the morning talk show "Wills, Webster and Coleman in the Morning" in October 1998. (The show's name was shortened to "Wills and Coleman" in 2001 after Webster's departure.)

After the Cleveland Browns returned to the NFL in 1999 as a new expansion franchise, Coleman served as radio sideline reporter for WMJI (later WMMS) and WTAM's coverage of its games until 2005, when he began showing signs of the illness which would ultimately cause his premature death.

Coleman was inducted into the Cleveland Press Club Hall of Fame in 2006.

On September 26, 2006, Cleveland mayor Frank G. Jackson declared that September 26 would be "Casey Coleman Day."

On October 11, 2006, the Browns dedicated the indoor practice facility at the team headquarters in Berea, Ohio, as "The Casey Coleman Fieldhouse".

Coleman died on November 27, 2006, after a 14-month struggle with pancreatic cancer. His death was reported by his co-host, Bill Wills, on WTAM's Wills and Coleman show the morning of his death. He is survived by his wife Mary and daughters Chelsea and Kayla Coleman.

== Awards and honors ==
- Four-time Lower Great Lakes Emmy Awards recipient
- 2006 Lower Great Lakes Emmy Awards Silver Circle Award recipient
- Cleveland Press Club Journalism Hall of Fame inductee (class of 2006)
- Cleveland Association of Broadcasters Hall of Fame inductee (class of 2006)
- Ohio Associated Press Broadcasters Hall of Fame inductee (class of 2008)
- Indoor practice facility at Browns training complex named "The Casey Coleman Fieldhouse"
