= Mike Hegan =

American baseball player (1942–2013)

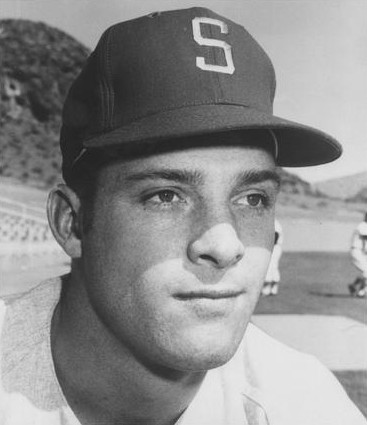
- Hegan with the Seattle Pilots in 1969
- First baseman / Outfielder
- Born: July 21, 1942; Cleveland, Ohio, U.S.
- Died: December 25, 2013 (aged 71); Hilton Head, South Carolina, U.S.
- Batted: Left Threw: Left

MLB debut
- September 13, 1964, for the New York Yankees

Last MLB appearance
- July 8, 1977, for the Milwaukee Brewers

MLB statistics
- Batting average: .242
- Home runs: 53
- Runs batted in: 229
- Stats at Baseball Reference

Teams
- New York Yankees (1964, 1966–1967); Seattle Pilots / Milwaukee Brewers (1969–1971); Oakland Athletics (1971–1973); New York Yankees (1973–1974); Milwaukee Brewers (1974–1977)

Career highlights and awards
- All-Star (1969); World Series champion (1972)

James Michael Hegan (July 21, 1942 – December 25, 2013) was an American professional baseball player, who later worked as a sports commentator. In Major League Baseball (MLB) he was a first baseman and outfielder, and played for three different American League (AL) franchises between 1964 and 1977. He was the son of longtime Cleveland Indians catcher Jim Hegan.

== Early years ==
A graduate of Saint Ignatius High School in Cleveland, Hegan attended College of the Holy Cross in Worcester, Massachusetts, on a football and baseball scholarship. In August 1961, he signed with the New York Yankees after being offered contracts by 15 major league teams. Hegan later continued his college education at John Carroll University in Cleveland.

Hegan played for multiple minor league teams within the Yankees organization, both before and after his major league debut. He spent the 1962 season with the Class-D Fort Lauderdale Yankees, 1963 with the Single-A Idaho Falls Yankees, parts of 1964 and 1965 with the Double-A Columbus Confederate Yankees, parts of 1965 and 1966 with the Triple-A Toledo Mud Hens, and 1968 with the Triple-A Syracuse Chiefs.

== Major league career ==
=== New York Yankees ===
Hegan began his major league career with the New York Yankees in 1964, appearing in five games late in the regular season; he was hitless in five at bats. He was added to the Yankees' roster for the 1964 World Series, replacing the injured Tony Kubek. In the series, which the Yankees lost in seven games to the St. Louis Cardinals, Hegan appeared as a substitute in three games; he was hitless in one at bat, with one walk and one run scored.

Hegan played 13 games with the Yankees in 1966, batting .205, and 68 games in 1967, batting .136. In June 1968, the Yankees sold his contract to the Seattle Pilots, an expansion team being added to MLB for the 1969 season.

=== Seattle Pilots ===
Hegan played 95 games for the Pilots in 1969, batting .292 with eight home runs and 37 RBI. Hegan hit the first home run in franchise history, in his first at-bat with the team, on April 8. He was selected for the 1969 All-Star Game, but due to an injury was replaced by teammate Don Mincher on the AL roster, thus making them the only Seattle Pilot All-Stars.

=== Milwaukee Brewers ===
After the 1969 season, the Pilots franchise was sold and the team became the Milwaukee Brewers. Hegan played in 148 games for the Brewers during the 1970 season, batting .244 with 11 home runs and 52 RBI. During the 1970 season, Hegan started an error-less streak as a first baseman, which would last for 178 games – it stood as an American League record until it was broken by Kevin Youkilis on September 7, 2007. Midway through the 1971 season, Hegan was batting .221 with four home runs and 11 RBI in 46 games when his contract was sold to the Oakland Athletics.

=== Oakland Athletics ===
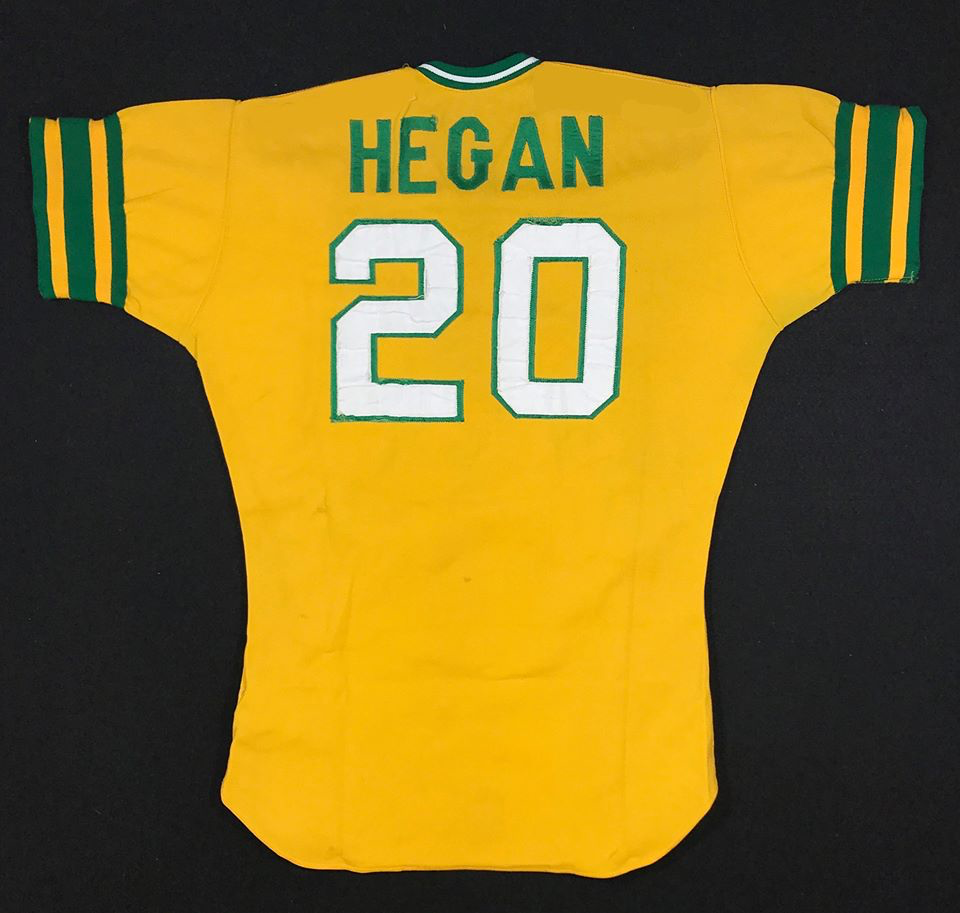
1972 Oakland Athletics #20 Mike Hegan Game Worn Alternate Jersey

During the second half of the 1971 season, Hegan appeared in 65 games for Oakland, mostly as a pinch hitter or defensive replacement; he batted .236 (13-for-55) with 3 RBI. In 1972, Hegan appeared in 98 regular season games, batting .329 (26-for-79) with a home run and 5 RBI. In the 1972 World Series, the Athletics defeated the Cincinnati Reds in seven games; Hegan appeared in six games, but was hitless in five at bats. Hegan's diving stop of a hot smash grounder off the bat of Cesar Geronimo in the ninth inning helped seal the win for the A's in game 2. In 1973, Hegan was with Oakland until mid-August, batting just .183 (13-for-71) with a home run and 5 RBI in 75 games played. On August 18, Oakland sent him to the Yankees for future considerations.

=== New York Yankees (second stint) ===
Hegan was the Yankees' regular first baseman for the remainder of the 1973 season; he appeared in 37 games and hit .275 (36-for-131) with six home runs and 14 RBI. His father, Jim Hegan, was the Yankees' bullpen coach for manager Ralph Houk at the time. On September 30, 1973, Hegan was the last batter in the original Yankee Stadium before its mid-70s renovation. Hegan was with the Yankees in 1974 through mid-May, appearing in 18 games and batting .226 (12-for-53) with two home runs and 9 RBI. On May 13, the Yankees sold his contract to the Brewers.

=== Milwaukee Brewers (second stint) ===
During his second stint with the Brewers (May 1974–July 1977), Hegan appeared in a total of 297 games, batting .239 with 19 home runs and 88 RBI. On September 3, 1976, he became the first Brewer to hit for the cycle, in an 11–2 win over the Detroit Tigers. Hegan's major league career ended when he was released by the Brewers on July 15, 1977.

In a total of 12 major league seasons, Hegan played in 966 games, batting .242 with 53 home runs and 229 RBI. Defensively, he recorded a .995 fielding percentage at first base and an overall .993 fielding percentage.

== Broadcasting ==
After his retirement from baseball as a player, Hegan spent the next twelve seasons as a television color commentator for the Brewers. In 1989, he was hired by the Cleveland Indians, and served as a commentator for the team on both radio and television for the next 23 seasons. He retired after the 2011 season, although on May 23, 2012, he filled in as commentator for a game against the Detroit Tigers.

== Personal life ==
Hegan was inducted to the St. Ignatius High School Athletic Hall of Fame in 1989, and was a 2011 inductee of the Greater Cleveland Sports Hall of Fame.

After his retirement as a broadcaster, Hegan took a role with the Indians as an alumni ambassador. He died on December 25, 2013, in his home in Hilton Head, South Carolina, due to heart failure at the age of 71.

== See also ==
- List of Major League Baseball players to hit for the cycle
- List of second-generation Major League Baseball players
- List of Cleveland Indians broadcasters

Achievements
Preceded by César Cedeño	Hitting for the cycle September 3, 1976	Succeeded by Bob Watson
