= Jim Donovan (sportscaster) =

American sportscaster (1956–2024)

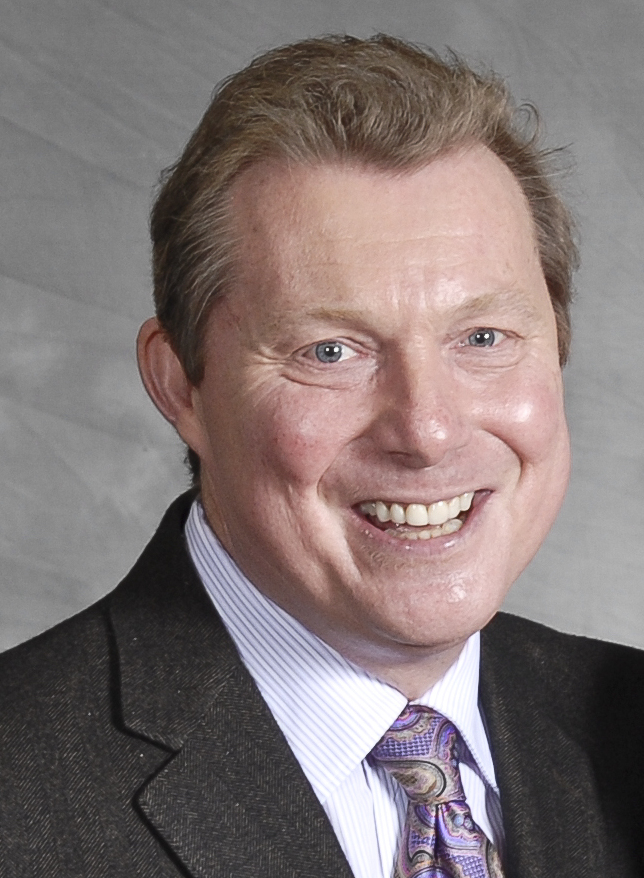
- Donovan in 2011
- Born: James Francis Donovan III; July 17, 1956; Boston, Massachusetts, U.S.
- Died: October 26, 2024 (aged 68); Cleveland, Ohio, U.S.
- Occupations: TV sports anchor; TV news anchor; NFL radio announcer
- Children: 1
- Awards: Three-time Lower Great Lakes Emmy Award winner

James Francis Donovan III (July 17, 1956 – October 26, 2024) was an American radio and television personality who served as sports director and news anchor for WKYC channel 3 (NBC) in Cleveland, Ohio, and was the radio voice of the Cleveland Browns Radio Network from 1999 to 2023.

== Early life and career beginnings ==
Donovan was born in Boston, Massachusetts, growing up there as a fan of Boston-area sports teams. He was a 1978 graduate of Boston University, where he worked at the university radio station with Howard Stern. He subsequently began his career as a sports director for WJON radio in St. Cloud, Minnesota. From Minnesota, he moved to Vermont, providing play-by-play basketball and hockey coverage for the Satellite News Channel in Burlington, Vermont. He also did play-by-play and sports anchoring at WVMT radio and WEZF-TV.

He also served for one season as play-by-play announcer for the Vermont Reds, a Cincinnati Reds minor league baseball team (which coincidentally is now the Akron RubberDucks, a Cleveland Guardians minor league team).

== WKYC ==
Following the death of WKYC weeknight sports anchor Jim Graner in 1976, the Channel 3 sports director job became something of a "revolving door," as at least six replacements (among them Don Schroeder, Tom Ryther, Joe Pelligrino, Jim Mueller and Wayland Boot) came and went over the next decade – this was until Donovan, who had joined the station in 1985 as weekend sports anchor, finally took over in 1986. He was also involved in news programming, Cleveland Browns pre- and post-game shows, and a weekly show during Browns seasons with Doug Dieken, Sam Rutigliano, and Tony Grossi called "The Point After". On January 16, 2012, Donovan expanded his duties at WKYC as he became the anchor of channel 3's 7 p.m. newscast. He continued in his role as sports anchor at 6 and 11p.m. He held the posts until his retirement in 2024.

== Play-by-play ==
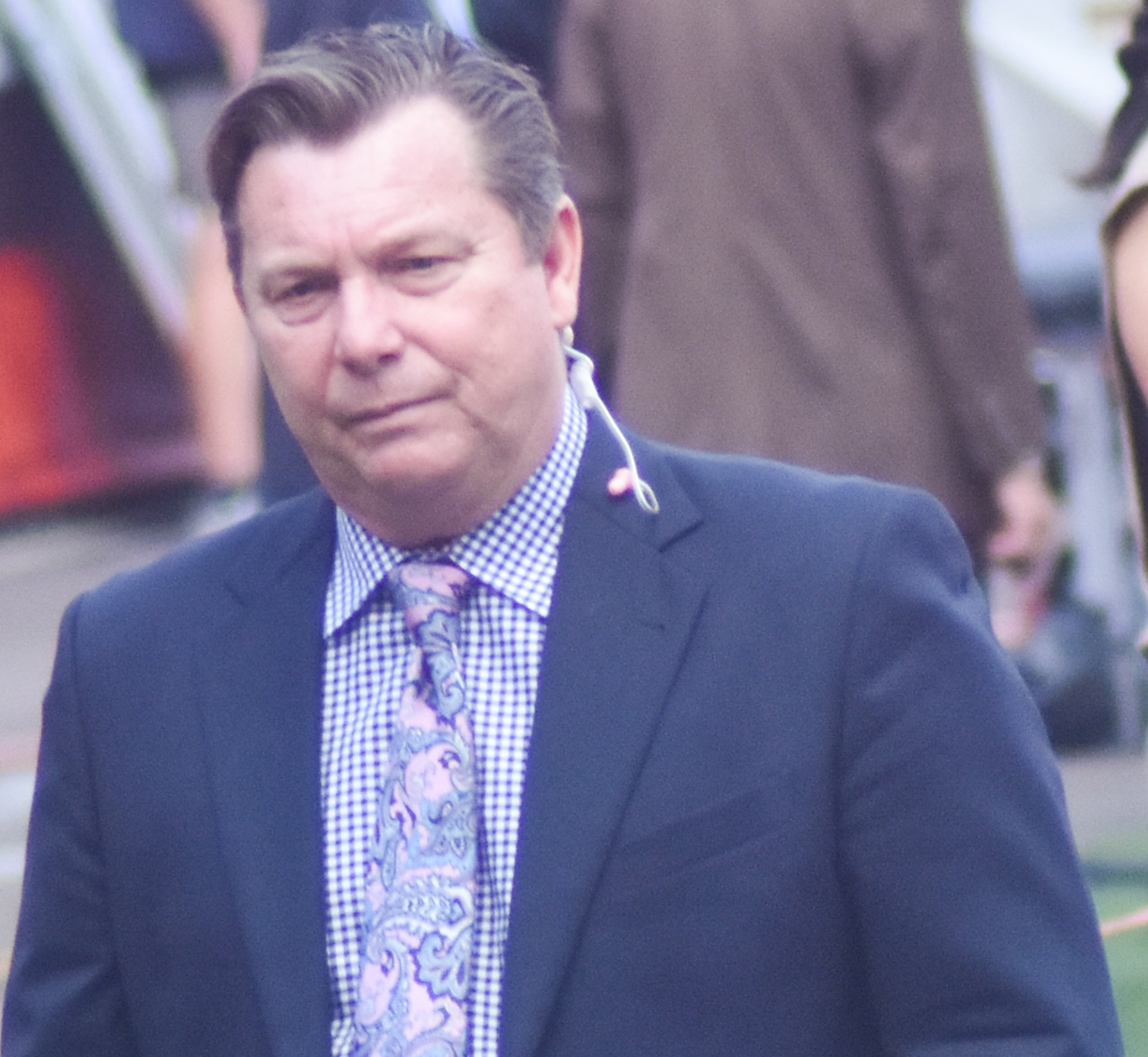
Donovan in 2015

On the national level Donovan called play-by-play for NBC Sports' NFL coverage from 1987 to 1997. He also handled swimming and soccer play-by-play in the 1992 and 1996 Summer Olympics for NBC, and World Cup Soccer in 1994. In 1999, when the Cleveland Browns returned to the NFL, Donovan was named as radio play-by-play voice of the team and served in that role until 2024. After WKYC acquired the local, over-the-air television rights to the Cleveland Indians, Donovan served as play-by-play announcer from 2006 to 2008.

=== Signature calls ===
"Run, William, Run!" – in reference to William Green's 64-yard touchdown run during the final Cleveland Browns vs. Atlanta Falcons game in 2002, allowing the Browns to make their first playoff appearance since returning to the league in 1999.

"Is this how it feels?" – when the Browns defeated the New York Jets in Week 3 of the 2018 season, their first victory in 635 days.

"Chubba Wubba Hubb!" – in reference to Nick Chubb's 92-yard touchdown run during an Atlanta Falcons vs Cleveland Browns game in 2018.

== Medical leave ==
On May 25, 2011, during the 11 pm newscast, Donovan announced he had leukemia for the last ten years, and that he would be taking a leave of absence to undergo a (what would be a successful) bone marrow transplant. On September 11, 2011, Donovan returned to the Browns broadcasting booth in time for their opener against the Cincinnati Bengals. The next night, he returned to the sports anchor chair at WKYC, as well as his hosting duties on STO. Donovan met with his bone marrow donor on Thanksgiving night in 2013, when Dallas Gentry from Wise, Virginia, visited the Donovan family.

Donovan announced on May 31, 2023, that his leukemia had relapsed and would be once again undergoing treatment with chemotherapy. On September 10, following his broadcast of the opening game of the 2023 season for the Browns, Donovan announced he would step away from announcing Browns games to undergo leukemia treatment. On August 29, 2024, Donovan announced his retirement as the Browns lead radio announcer due to undergoing further cancer treatment.

== Personal life and death ==
Donovan, his wife Cheryl, and daughter Meghan lived in Hinckley, Ohio. Donovan died from chronic lymphocytic leukemia in Cleveland, Ohio, on October 26, 2024, at the age of 68.

== Awards and honors ==
- Three-time National Sports Media Association (then National Sportscasters and Sportswriters Association) Vermont Sportscaster of the Year (1982–1984).
- Three-time Lower Great Lakes Emmy Award winner.
- 1988 Cleveland Press Club All-Ohio Best Sportscaster.
- Cleveland Association of Broadcasters Hall of Fame inductee (class of 2005)
- Cleveland Press Club Journalism Hall of Fame inductee (class of 2009).
- 2016 Cleveland Sports Awards Lifetime Achievement Award
