= WJMO =

Spanish radio station in Cleveland, Ohio

- Cleveland, Ohio; United States
- Broadcast area: Greater Cleveland; Northeast Ohio
- Frequency: 1300 kHz
- Branding: La Mega Cleveland

Programming
- Language: Spanish
- Format: Tropical music
- Affiliations: Cleveland Browns Radio Network; Cleveland Cavaliers

Ownership
- Owner: Urban One; (Blue Chip Broadcasting Licenses, Ltd)
- Operator: La Mega Media Inc.
- Sister stations: WENZ; WERE; WZAK

History
- First air date: July 9, 1949
- Former call signs: WERE (1949–2007)
- Call sign meaning: Taken from the former WJMO (1490 AM)

Technical information
- Licensing authority: FCC
- Facility ID: 41389
- Class: B
- Power: 5,000 watts (unlimited)
- Transmitter coordinates: 41°20′28.00″N 81°44′30.00″W
- Repeater: 93.1 WZAK-HD2 Cleveland

Links
- Public license information: Public file; LMS
- Webcast: Listen live
- Website: lamegacleveland.com

WJMO (1300 AM) is a commercial radio station licensed to Cleveland, Ohio, United States, and airs a Spanish/tropical music format known as La Mega Cleveland. Owned by Urban One and operated by La Mega Media, the station serves Greater Cleveland and much of Northeast Ohio. WJMO's studios are located in Cleveland's Tremont neighborhood, while the station transmitter resides in North Royalton, Ohio. In addition to a standard analog transmission, the station streams online and is simulcasted on WZAK's second digital subchannel. The station also airs Spanish broadcasts of Cleveland Browns games via the Cleveland Browns Radio Network, and airs Spanish broadcasts of Cleveland Cavaliers home games.

The station was established in 1949 as WERE, initially owned by former Cleveland mayor-turned-broadcaster Ray T. Miller. The WJMO call sign and former urban gospel format were adopted in 2007 after an intellectual property swap between it and 1490 AM in Cleveland Heights. Since November 1, 2024, La Mega Media has operated the station.

== History ==
=== WERE (1300 AM) ===
==== Early years ====
1948 WERE-FM advertisement

WJMO began as WERE on July 6, 1949, broadcasting as 1300 kHz; unlike most AM stations of the time, WERE actually went on the air a year after its FM sister station, WERE-FM at 98.5 MHz. Both stations were founded by former Cleveland mayor Ray T. Miller under the name Cleveland Broadcasting Incorporated. After the FM station's launch, WERE-FM would primarily simulcast the programming of its more popular AM sister station.

During the 1950s, WERE was the first popular Top 40 station in the market, spearheaded by now-legendary personalities like Bill Randle, "Captain" Carl Reese, Phil McLean, Ronnie Barrett, Howie Lund and Bob Forster. Randle was the most influential of the group, as he was the first major-market disk jockey in the Northeast United States to play Elvis Presley, and bolstered the careers of a number of young musicians, including The Four Lads, Bobby Darin, and Fats Domino. Future NBC announcer and voice-over artist Danny Dark also was a host on WERE in the early 1960s.

In the 1960s, the station was a middle-of-the-road radio station with personalities that included sportscaster Bob Neal in morning drive, the team of Jeff Baxter and Jack Riley (who would later achieve fame as Eliot Carlin on The Bob Newhart Show) in afternoon drive, and Bill Gordon with a nightly talk show from his apartment on East 30th Street; Gordon's show was known as "Apartment 13," for the station's 1300 kHz signal.

Cleveland Broadcasting Incorporated would later add stations to their holdings, first purchasing WLEC and WLEC-FM in Sandusky in 1960; then KFAC (1330 AM) and KFAC (92.3 FM) in Los Angeles in 1962. WERE had also obtained a construction permit in the mid-1950s for WERE-TV on channel 65; however, due to the obscurity of the UHF dial at the time, the television station never made it on the air.

After Ray T. Miller's death in 1966, Cleveland Broadcasting Incorporated was acquired by Atlantic States Industries (ASI) for a combined $9 million in May 1968. Due to ASI already owning five AM stations and one FM station, and because of an interim policy/proposed rule by the Federal Communications Commission (FCC) that prohibited the purchase of an AM and FM station in the same market—the "one-to-a-customer" policy—the FCC ordered the divestiture of WERE-FM, along with WLEC and WLEC-FM, to a third party. WLEC and WLEC-FM were divested to RadiOhio that December, and WERE-FM was sold to L. E. Chenault (of Drake-Chenault Enterprises) concurrently; both deals fell through. WLEC AM/FM were ultimately retained by the sellers and spun off to a limited partnership, Lake Erie Broadcasting.

KFAC and KFAC-FM in Los Angeles were given waivers to the "one-to-a-customer" policy, and the deal was approved by the commission on October 29, 1969, on the condition that WERE-FM would be sold "as soon as practicable." General Cinema Corporation acquired WERE-FM in May 1970 for $525,000, the deal was approved that July; ASI was later granted a tax break by the FCC with the sale.

WERE served as the flagship station for the Cleveland Browns twice: once from 1950 to 1951, and again from 1962 to 1967. During the Browns' second stay at the station, it was the memorable broadcast team of Gib Shanley and Jim Graner providing play-by-play and color commentary, respectively. From 1951 until 1972, WERE was the flagship station for Cleveland Indians radio broadcasts, and was the first flagship for the expansion Cleveland Cavaliers in 1970 and 1971; in addition to hosting an evening sports call-in show hosted by Pete Franklin. Both the Cavs and Indians radio rights, as well as Franklin's Sportsline program, moved from WERE to WWWE in 1972.

==== People Power ====
WERE abruptly switched to a talk radio format on February 14, 1972. Branded as "People Power", the station attracted negative attention at launch for its aggressive on-air presentation headlined by controversial hosts Gary Dee (Gary D. Gilbert), Merle Pollis and Joel Rose; while WERE reportedly lost $1 million in ad billings within the first three days, it quickly went up to among the top positions in the Cleveland Arbitron ratings. Dee's populist-redneck style in particular, combined with his morning drive-time slot, made him Cleveland's top-rated talk host within the first complete ratings book following the format switch; George Forbes, then the president of Cleveland City Council and an on-air foil for Dee, was also offered a talk show of his own, owing to the FCC's Fairness Doctrine policy of equal time.

WERE would drop the talk format on June 18, 1975, in favor of NBC Radio's News and Information Service; Dee would promptly be hired as the morning host at WHK (1420 AM). Prior to becoming an investigative journalist for several different Cleveland television stations, Carl Monday was a reporter for WERE during its all-news period.

ASI would sell off WERE to Olivia-Neuhoff Broadcasting, headed by George Olivia, Jr. and WERE general manager Paul Neuhoff, for $3.1 million in April 1976; Olivia-Neuhoff would then purchase WGCL (the former WERE-FM) from General Cinema that August 9 for $2.5 million, thus reuniting both stations. The sale of WGCL was the result of years of litigation over a proposed purchase of WEFM in Chicago by GCC, as well as lost revenue and advertisers over a failed format change at a former GCC station in Atlanta. Despite not having any common ownership with General Cinema, WERE's license name was changed to "GCC Communications of Cleveland" after the purchase of WGCL; both stations would remain under that name until they were sold again in 1986.

Following the shutdown of NBC's News and Information Service, WERE moved back into an all-talk format, which it more or less maintained for the rest of the century.

WERE and WGCL were sold to Detroit-based Metropolis Broadcasting on June 18, 1986, for a combined $10 million; after a high-profile relaunch of WGCL as WNCX that wound up with an abrupt format switch 16 weeks later, combined with other issues, Metropolis quickly withdrew from station ownership altogether. Cleveland-based Metroplex Communications, in a joint venture with area jeweler Larry Robinson, purchased WERE and WNCX in July 1988 for $11.6 million. Metroplex was headed by Norman Wain and Bob Weiss, who once owned WIXY (1260 AM) and WDOK in the late 1960s; Robinson also had previous station ownership experience—having owned WIXY's successor WBBG (1260 AM), along with WMJI—in the early 1980s.

Along with Bob Fuller hosting a morning drive news block, the station's lineup consisted of: local hosts Merle Pollis, Joel Rose and Greg Brinda; an afternoon drive news block hosted by Jim McIntyre; and Michael Jackson's syndicated talk show. WERE initially carried The Rush Limbaugh Show from 1989 until June 1990, when WWWE (1100 AM) picked up the program.

In 1992, locally originated talk on WERE was replaced by an audio simulcast of CNN Headline News, with local news at :15 and :45. Hosts employed by WERE such as Merle Pollis, Joel Rose, and Les Levine (who had taken over for Brinda) were let go, with the only local talk shows left on the station being brokered programs, in which a host/producer buys the time from the station. The local news product was eliminated in August 1993, as news staffers Jim McIntyre, Bob Fuller, Tom Moore and Cindy Lin were let go; an article in The Plain Dealer on August 13, 1993, referred to this as a "shifting of the station's emphasis from local news to cheaper syndicated and community programming."

==== Brokered programming ====
WERE continued with the format featuring mostly brokered programs. Here, a radio producer would purchase blocked time from the station, and then produced the program, sold commercial air time, and keep the profit. As a result, the programming was very diverse, but listenership was very sparse, with WERE sometimes not even showing up in the Arbitron ratings.

Select programs on WERE during this period ranged from America's Workforce (labor issues in the Cleveland area), to The Gay 90's (homosexual and diversity issues) to Talking Books (interviews with literary figures), to Those Antique Guys (appraisals and commentary on antiques).

One of the most popular shows on WERE during this period was the Your Music Show, a daily weekday block of a variety music from the 1940s through the 1970s programmed by Jim Davis, who also served as an on-air host from 1–3pm (after illness took Carl Reese off the air), followed by Ted Hallaman from 3–5pm after WRMR 1420-AM signed off permanently in July 2004. The Your Music Show was sponsored by the Original Mattress Factory and aired from August 2004 through January 2006 when the WERE daytime format was changed.

==== Later years ====
Logo before June 2007

Metroplex Communications merged into San Antonio-based Clear Channel Communications in October 1993 in a combined $54 million deal, this included WERE and WNCX; Clear Channel would then take control of WENZ's sales operations in March 1994 via a joint sales agreement, eventually buying the station outright in 1996. Following passage of the Telecom Act of 1996, Clear Channel announced a $4.4 billion merger with Jacor Communications in 1998; to comply with federal ownership guidelines, WERE and WENZ were sold to Radio One, while WNCX was sold to Infinity Broadcasting.

WENZ changed formats from modern rock to mainstream urban as Z 107.9 shortly afterward, while WERE retained its profitable brokered format until 2006.

=== WJMO (2007–present) ===
Final logo as an urban gospel station.

On June 4, 2007, WERE and WJMO (1490 AM) were involved in what was reported in the press as a "frequency trade" by owner Radio One. In reality, these two stations swapped call letters along with their respective radio format. WERE changed its call letters to WJMO; changed branding to "Praise 1300"; and changed its format to the urban gospel format previously heard on WJMO (1490 AM), which concurrently had its call sign changed to WERE and format changed to news/talk. On and off-air personnel were reassigned between both stations.

WJMO re-branded as "Praise 94.5" on November 11, 2016, coinciding with the station now being relayed on low-power Cleveland translator W233CG (94.5 FM).

In summer 2022, WZAK-HD2's South Asian programming abruptly stopped airing, with the subchannel simulcasting WJMO's urban gospel format.

==== Transition to Spanish programming ====
As part of a larger multi-market partnership between Urban One and La Mega Media Inc. (LMM), WJMO dropped its urban gospel format for Spanish variety as "La Mega 1300" on November 1, 2024, concurrent with LMM assuming operational control of the station; The final song to play as "Praise 94.5" was "Awesome God" by Helen Baylor. The move returned the heretofore online-only "La Mega" to the terrestrial radio dial, as LMM (then known as TSJ Media) operated WLFM-LP (channel 6)—a low-power analog television station whose audio transmissions were audible at 87.7 FM from 2014 until 2020. WJMO's former urban gospel format remained on a digital subchannel of WENZ, which W233CG now relays.

"Fuego 1300" logo used during the first half of 2025

In January 2025, the station changed its branding to "Fuego 1300", and tweaked its format to focus more on Spanish and tropical music, making the station the first and only tropical music station serving the area. The station then went back to the La Mega branding and logo in September 2025.

Local personalities heard on WJMO include Michelle Polanco (middays). Programs that are heard on multiple "La Mega" stations such as "The Flow" (morning drive) and "With Latin Flavor" with Diego Go and Maricris Gutierrez (afternoon drive) also air on WJMO.
