= Bob Neal (Cleveland sportscaster) =

American sportscaster (1916–1983)

Robert Neal (1916 – December 29, 1983) was an American sportscaster who worked primarily in Cleveland, Ohio.

Neal graduated from Columbia University.

He broadcast the Cleveland Indians on radio 1957–1961 and 1965–1972, and on television 1952–1953 and 1962–1964. He was also the original broadcaster for Cleveland Browns football games on radio and television starting in 1946 and continuing through 1951. He handled the 1954 Orange Bowl game for CBS television, 1955 and 1956 World Series for Mutual radio and the 1957 World Series for NBC radio.

In 1955, Neal began his own World of Sports program Monday - Thursday nights on Mutual.

Neal also worked as a sportscaster for KYW-TV (now WKYC-TV) in Cleveland, appearing alongside weatherman Joe Finan; occasionally, fellow sportscaster Jim Graner would fill in for Neal.

On September 20, 1961, Neal along with Hank Greenberg called a baseball game for ABC between the New York Yankees and Baltimore Orioles.
