= Nev Chandler =

American sportscaster (1946–1994)

- Born: Neville A. Chandler; October 2, 1946; Lakewood, Ohio, U.S.
- Died: August 7, 1994 (age 47); Rocky River, Ohio, U.S.
- Occupations: TV sports anchor MLB radio announcer NFL radio announcer
- Awards: Five-time NSSA Ohio Sportscaster of the Year

Neville A. Chandler Jr. (October 2, 1946 – August 7, 1994) was an American Cleveland, Ohio-area sports broadcaster.

== Life and career ==
Chandler graduated from Rocky River High School and, in 1968, Northwestern University. In the 1970s, he worked for several television stations in Ohio and sometimes hosted a sports talk show on WWWE-AM.

From 1980 to 1984, Chandler served as WWWE's sports director and teamed with Herb Score on Cleveland Indians radio broadcasts. In 1985, he moved to television station WEWS as sports director and sports anchor.

He was best known for calling play-by-play for the Cleveland Browns from 1985 to 1993, a time during which the team made the playoffs five straight years. He also called Cleveland Cavaliers telecasts from 1982 to 1985.

The quality of Chandler's broadcasts and the excitement of his voice made him a fan favorite and a regular choice for the soundtrack of NFL Films productions. The title of NFL Films' movie about the 1986 Browns, Pandemonium Palace, comes from Chandler's call of the team's double-overtime playoff win over the New York Jets.

Chandler died of colon cancer on Sunday, August 7, 1994. He was buried in Lakewood Park Cemetery in Rocky River.

== Signature calls ==
- 5–4–3–2–1 Touchdown! – when a Browns player ran in for a touchdown (especially after a long pass)
- They are serenading the team with a chorus in "boo-flat" – when the Cleveland fans booed the home team after a poor performance
- Baseball 7th inning stretch call “it’s the middle of the seventh and Tribe fans know what time that is... it’s time to rise and shine! Stretch it out! The score...’’

== Awards and honors ==
- Five-time NSSA Ohio Sportscaster of the Year (1987, 1988, 1989, 1992, 1993)
- Ohio Broadcasters Hall of Fame Inductee (class of 1993)
- Cleveland Press Club Journalism Hall of Fame Inductee (class of 1994)
- 1994 Society of Professional Journalists (Cleveland chapter) Distinguished Service Award recipient
- Cleveland Association of Broadcaster Hall of Fame Inductee (class of 1995)
- Ohio Associated Press Broadcasters Hall of Fame Inductee (class of 2004)
