= WMJI =

Classic hits radio station in Cleveland, Ohio

- Cleveland, Ohio; United States
- Broadcast area: Greater Cleveland
- Frequency: 105.7 MHz (HD Radio)
- Branding: Majic 105.7

Programming
- Language: English
- Format: Classic hits
- Subchannels: HD2: K-Love Eras

Ownership
- Owner: iHeartMedia; (iHM Licenses, LLC)
- Sister stations: WAKS; WARF; WGAR-FM; WHLK; WMMS; WTAM

History
- First air date: December 6, 1948
- Former call signs: WTAM-FM (1948–1956); KYW-FM (1956–1965); WKYC-FM (1965–1972); WWWM (1972–1982); WMJI (1982–1987); WMJI-FM (1987–1988)
- Call sign meaning: "Magic"

Technical information
- Licensing authority: FCC
- Facility ID: 73268
- Class: B
- ERP: 16,000 watts
- HAAT: 344 m (1,129 ft)
- Transmitter coordinates: 41°23′04″N 81°41′44″W
- Translator: HD2: 103.7 W279BT (Cleveland)

Links
- Public license information: Public file; LMS
- Webcast: Listen live (via iHeartRadio)
- Website: wmji.iheart.com

WMJI (105.7 FM, "Majic 105.7") is a commercial radio station licensed to Cleveland, Ohio, United States, featuring a classic hits format. Owned by iHeartMedia, the station serves Greater Cleveland and much of surrounding Northeast Ohio. WMJI's studios are located in downtown Cleveland's Gateway District at the Six Six Eight Building, while the transmitter is sited in Parma. In addition to a standard analog transmission, WMJI broadcasts over two HD Radio channels and is also available online via iHeartRadio.

This station signed on as WTAM-FM in 1948, the FM extension of NBC-owned WTAM, and originally acted as an outright simulcast of the AM station. Both stations, along with WNBK (channel 3), were traded by NBC to Westinghouse Broadcasting in 1955 in exchange for Westinghouse's KYW and KYW-TV in Philadelphia; the KYW call signs were transferred to the Cleveland stations after the trade closed. Westinghouse began programming KYW-FM independently in 1958 with classical music and fine arts fare, but removed all local announcers one year later due to an absence of advertising revenue. After the Westinghouse-NBC trade was ordered to be reversed by the Federal Communications Commission (FCC), NBC retook control of the Cleveland stations in June 1965, rebadging them WKYC, WKYC-FM and WKYC-TV. WKYC-FM retained its classical format after WCLV, which had a classical format of their own, successfully lobbied NBC to retain the format. By 1971, WKYC-FM switched to an easy listening format.

NBC spun off WKYC and WKYC-FM to Nick Mileti in 1972, with WKYC becoming WWWE and WKYC-FM becoming WWWM. By 1975, WWWM was relaunched as album-oriented rock "M-105", competing intensely against crosstown WMMS for listeners, then transitioned to classic rock by the early 1980s. Mileti sold minority control of WWWM to brothers Tom and Jim Embrescia, who were also station executives; the Embrescias bought WBBG at the same time Mileti sold off WWWE. After both stations were sold to jeweler Larry Robinson, WWWM relaunched in June 1982 as adult contemporary "Majic" WMJI. Jacor bought both stations in 1984, spinning off WBBG in 1988 after it simulcast WMJI for several months. WMJI inherited the music library of WBBG predecessor WIXY and staged several "WIXY 1260" reunions in the late 1980s and again in 1997. John Lanigan became WMJI's morning host in 1985, a position he held for over 29 years. Lanigan's show was a ratings leader throughout his tenure, teamed initially with newscaster John Webster. Comedian Jimmy Malone joined Lanigan's show as a recurring guest with his weekly "Knucleheads in the News" feature, then by 1991 became Lanigan's co-host and remained with the station until 2021.

Former WMMS music director Denny Sanders joined WMJI in 1988 for an oldies-oriented evening program. Purchased by onetime Malrite Communications associate Carl Hirsch in 1991, WMJI was relaunched as a full-time oldies outlet under program director John Gorman. The station staged its first "Majic Moondog Coronation Ball" in 1992, a spiritual successor to the 1952 Moondog Coronation Ball, and continued to host them on an annual basis through 2017. When Hirsch sold WMJI and WMMS (the latter purchased by Hirsch in 1994) to Nationwide Communications in 1996, Sanders replaced Gorman as program director and remained in the role until 2001. Under Sanders, WMJI was the recipient of its first Marconi Award for oldies station of the year. Jacor repurchased WMJI in 1998 as part of their merger with Nationwide, then sold itself to Clear Channel Broadcasting (now iHeartMedia) the following year. From 1999 to 2001, WMJI was the FM flagship for the Cleveland Browns Radio Network after the team was reactivated. WMJI continues to lead local ratings despite multiple staff cutbacks and downsizing under Clear Channel/iHeartMedia ownership. Since 2011, WMJI has played Christmas music on an annual basis during the holiday season.

== History ==
=== Application and construction ===
NBC, who had owned and operated Cleveland radio station WTAM since 1930 as part of their Red Network, filed paperwork with the Federal Communications Commission (FCC) on February 8, 1944, to construct an FM station at 43.7 MHz. Cleveland had one FM station in operation at the time—WBOE, the station of the Cleveland Public Schools—and the industry was expecting a boom in radio, led by FM, once World War II ended. NBC's application was one of ten in Cleveland alongside proposed FM stations in Elyria and Akron, prompting the FCC to place all of them through a combined competitive hearing in April 1946. The FCC approved all twelve permits on June 30, 1947; after several frequency changes, by March 11, 1948, NBC moved the proposed frequency to 105.7 MHz.

Construction began in the spring of 1948 on the WTAM transmitter tower in Brecksville for both WTAM-FM and television station WNBK, with NBC intending to sign on both at the same time. While WNBK took to the air on October 31, 1948, WTAM-FM did so on December 6, 1948, simulcasting WTAM's programming.

=== The NBC-Westinghouse swap ===
Rumors began to emerge in November 1954 that NBC was planning to swap WTAM, WTAM-FM and WNBK to Westinghouse Broadcasting (WBC) in exchange for WBC's Philadelphia properties, KYW and WPTZ. By March 1955, reports suggested NBC was willing to pay WBC $3 million (equivalent to $36.1 million in 2025) to enable the trade. The asset swap between NBC and WBC was announced on May 17, 1955, as one of the largest transactions in American broadcasting at the time. No reason was given for the deal, but published reports suggested NBC desired an owned-station in Philadelphia, a larger market than Cleveland and closer to factories owned by RCA, NBC's parent. Cleveland was also not a stranger for Westinghouse: the company operated KDPM in the mid-1920s as an experimental shortwave relay for KDKA in Pittsburgh.

The five stations were valued at or around $25 million (equivalent to $300 million in 2025); with the $3 million cash payment, the deal was estimated to be near or at $30 million. As part of the deal, the Cleveland stations were slated to remain as NBC affiliates but WNBK's call sign was expected to be changed. The FCC approved the swap on December 28, 1955, by a 6–1 vote. Commissioner Robert T. Bartley dissented, saying the deal raised "disturbing and unanswered questions" and felt it deserved a full hearing. All executives and technical staff under contract to NBC were transferred to Philadelphia and replaced with WBC staff; this also included engineer Eddie Leonard, who helped build WTAM in 1923 for founding owner Willard Battery. The swap was finalized on January 23, 1956. Three weeks later, on February 13, the Cleveland stations were jointly renamed KYW, KYW-FM and KYW-TV, as WBC retained rights to the KYW call sign. The renaming took place alongside an extensive marketing effort while WBC was openly looking for new air talent for the radio stations.

=== A separate identity for KYW-FM ===
KYW-FM continued to be as a total simulcast of KYW, but WBC began considering separate programming on the FM side as early as April 1957. On August 1, 1958, KYW-FM started carrying five hours of unique programming daily centered around classical music, light classical music and jazz. Continuing to simulcast KYW all other times, KYW-FM was regarded a "new" station and followed WDOK-FM, WERE-FM and WGAR-FM in originating programming different from their AM sisters. On the new format's first day, WDOK-FM encouraged their listeners to sample KYW-FM, and KYW encouraged their listeners to sample WDOK in return two weeks later. KYW-FM employed two announcers of their own, David Hawthorne and Myles Martin, and planned additional cultural programming along with stereophonic sound. The change also followed KYW-FM's transmitter moving from Brecksville to the tower in Parma used by KYW and KYW-TV. Program logs for KYW-FM were published in The Plain Dealer, becoming the first FM station to do so. A series of surveys conducted by WBC showed that by 1959, 35.7 percent of Cleveland households were now equipped with an FM receiver and 42 percent of those households were of a higher income bracket.

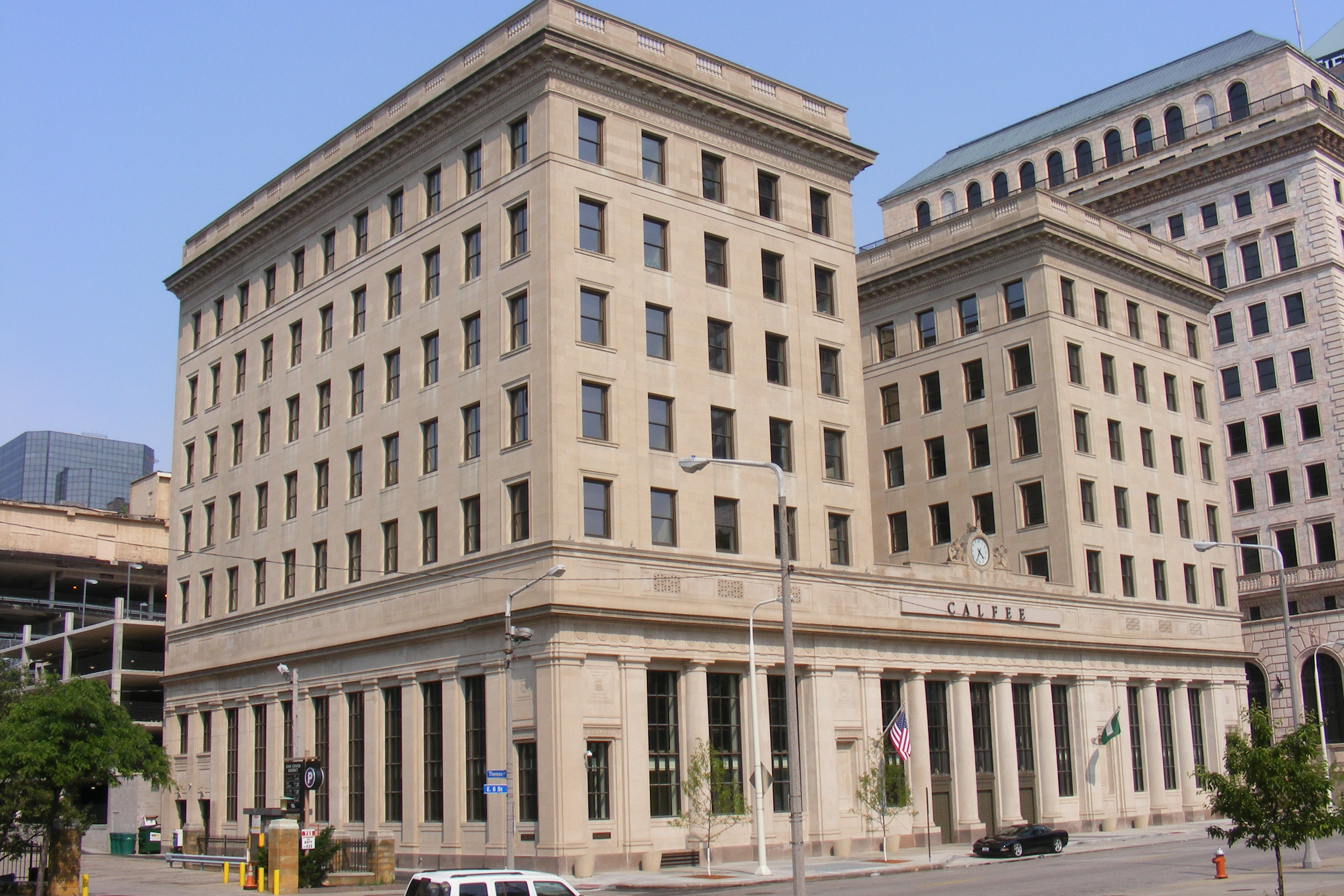
1405 East 6th Street (now the Calfee Building), home to KYW radio and television beginning in December 1960

WBC considered KYW-FM "an experiment in Cleveland broadcasting" and did not sell or accept any advertising until it could get an understanding of the FM's audience. The format ultimately did not air any commercials throughout its first year and by October 1959, dismissed all local announcers in favor of taped music programmed by Fort Wayne Philharmonic Orchestra director Marshall Turkin. KYW-FM was taken dark in December 1960 when all three stations moved from the Superior Building to 1405 East 6th Street (now the Calfee Building). When KYW-FM returned to air, it simulcast the AM outright; by the end of 1961, WBC acquired 60 hours per week of tapes for KYW-FM, KDKA-FM and WBZ-FM in a group deal. By 1963, KYW-FM programmed independently from noon to 6 p.m. daily.

=== Justice Department lawsuit, FCC scrutiny and swap back to NBC ===
Almost immediately after the 1956 trade was approved, published reports claimed NBC engaged in coercion, drawing interest from the U.S. Justice Department (DOJ). During a Senate Commerce Committee hearing in the spring of 1956, WBC president Donald McGannon testified NBC threatened to withdraw their affiliations from WBC's stations in Boston, Philadelphia and Pittsburgh if the swap was not agreed to. The DOJ filed a civil lawsuit against NBC and RCA on December 5, 1956, on violating antitrust law with the swap; in reply, FCC chairman George McConnaughey wished to have seen the DOJ's letter before approving the deal, but his vote was unchanged. The lawsuit also accused the swap of being illegal and called for the Philadelphia licenses to be revoked. The FCC conditionally renewed the licenses for NBC's Philadelphia stations, WRCV and WRCV-TV, in July 1957 amid a $150 million lawsuit filed by Philco (equivalent to $1.72 billion in 2025). One month later, Philco filed a protest against the renewals.

This week's Supreme Court decision, keeping alive the possibility of Justice Department action, must have been a real shock to the many employees of both NBC and Westinghouse who were dislocated by the deal three years ago. At that time, a large group of Cleveland NBC employees sold their homes here and moved to the new stations in Philadelphia, while the key personnel of Westinghouse in the Quaker City had to give up their homes in that city and move to Cleveland. It was observed at the time that this perhaps was the mightiest migration of broadcasters in history. The mountain passes between Cleveland-Philadelphia for weeks were jammed with the wagons of NBC and Westinghouse employees.

— George E. Condon, The Plain Dealer, February 28, 1959

The DOJ's lawsuit was tried in the Eastern Pennsylvania District Court, which dismissed it on January 11, 1958. This was appealed to the U.S. Supreme Court and overturned in United States v. Radio Corporation of America, ruling the FCC's approval of the deal was not meant to prevent antitrust law enforcement. By September 1959, NBC and RCA entered a wide-ranging consent decree with the DOJ, which included the divesture of WRCV AM/TV in a three-year period. NBC and RCA agreed to swap them, along with WRC, WRC-FM and WRC-TV in Washington, D.C., to RKO General in exchange for WNAC and WNAC-TV in Boston. Concurrently, NBC filed to purchase KTVU in San Francisco. This complicated series of transactions, all of which needed DOJ approval, fell apart by October 1961 when KTVU cancelled their sale. On October 22, 1962, the FCC began a hearing over WRCV and WRCV-TV's licenses amid a challenge to the TV license filed by Philco; this also included a review over the attempted RKO swap.

In a 5–0 ruling issued on July 29, 1964, the FCC renewed WRCV AM/TV's licenses under the condition they were traded back to WBC in exchange for KYW AM/FM/TV within 60 days. In its decision, the FCC criticized NBC of "deliberate extortion" in its actions against WBC. The Cleveland Press editorial board commended the ruling as recognizing "a nine-year-old injustice" but questioned the practicality of reversing the swap, especially with how KYW had become "deeply committed to Cleveland" since 1955. NBC initially declined to appeal and by mid-August requested documents on the KYW stations from WBC, then had executives visit the KYW studios. On September 1, NBC appealed the ruling alongside RKO General and Philco but agreed to the swap with WBC one month later, with the deadline extended to after RKO and Philco exhausted their legal options. Philco withdrew their appeal one month later while RKO appealed claiming losses of $2 million from the failed station swap in Boston, which the FCC deemed moot. RKO withdrew their appeal on June 3, 1965, as part of an undisclosed settlement.

When the NBC-WBC trade reversal was finalized on June 19, 1965, NBC renamed KYW AM/FM/TV as WKYC AM/FM/TV, playing off the "KY" identity WBC established in Cleveland. WKYC-FM's classical format was retained and now programmed daily from noon to midnight. Prior to the switch, competing classical outlet WCLV aired an editorial from station president C. K. Patrick urging NBC to keep classical programming, believing competition would benefit all stations. WKYC-FM and WCLV were joined by WJW-FM, which began airing a taped classical format in response to the FCC's FM Non-Duplication Rule. The NBC Radio affiliation moved back to WKYC and WKYC-FM in December 1965, but WKYC-FM carried NBC's Monitor in its entirety while WKYC integrated select segments from that program into their existing Top 40 format. Albert Petrak, later known for a long tenure with WCLV, joined WKYC-FM in October 1965 as lead announcer. By November 1966, WKYC-FM programmed from 9 a.m. to midnight and began originating taped programming for NBC's other FM owned-stations. WKYC-FM collaborated with WCLV for a prototype quadraphonic sound broadcast on May 14, 1970, with WCLV carrying two of the four audio channels and WKYC-FM the other two.

WKYC-FM continued with classical programming until April 5, 1971, when it switched to beautiful music dubbed "Gentle on Your Mind". This new format also included simulcasts of WKYC's morning host Jim Runyon and late-evening talk host Alan Douglas. The station's classical music library was later donated to the Cleveland Institute of Music, which arranged a three-day rummage sale fundraiser; the collection sold out in just over two hours.

=== Sale to Nick Mileti, becoming M-105 ===
Broadcasting magazine reported in November 1970 that NBC was entertaining offers for some or all of their radio stations, and that one group showed interest in buying all of NBC's AM stations. On January 14, 1972, Ohio Communications, a syndicate led by local sports executive Nick Mileti, agreed to purchase WKYC and WKYC-FM for $5.5 million (equivalent to $42.3 million in 2025). Mileti owned the Cleveland Cavaliers, Cleveland Barons, the Cleveland Arena with plans to build the Richfield Coliseum, and the deal was seen as the latest piece in his growing entertainment empire. Malrite Communications also expressed interest in the stations but their bid was rejected as being too low, leading them to buy WHK and WMMS instead. Thomas Embrescia, a former WDOK-FM and WIXY salesman who since 1969 was vice president of sales for Mileti's other business ventures, was named vice president and general manager for the radio stations; brother James Embrescia was hired as sales manager.

The deal closed on November 7, 1972; one week later, on November 14, WKYC-FM was renamed WWWM, and WKYC became WWWE. The "M" in WWWM had no exact meaning but alluded to either "music", "more" or "Mileti". While WWWE added play-by-play from the Cavaliers, Cleveland Indians and Cleveland Crusaders (both also controlled by Mileti), WWWM's format remained unchanged and both stations remained NBC affiliates but Monitor was dropped from the schedule. As part of the deal, WWWE and WWWM were required to move out of the 1405 East 6th Street studios and, defying speculation they would move to the Coliseum, signed a lease agreement with the Park Centre complex in the city's downtown. The move was completed on March 4, 1974, and boasted studios at the mezzanine level with over two miles of wiring.

On April 29, 1974, WWWM rebranded as "Stereo 105 M", started broadcasting around the clock and began originating their own local newscasts with WWWE staff. The station also featured play-by-play from the Cleveland Nets of World TeamTennis. These changes came alongside upgrades to the station's transmitter with the introduction of circular polarization. Eric Stevens, formerly program director for WIXY, was hired by WWWM in January 1975 as both program and operations manager; the station also announced a coming switch to contemporary music, albeit undetermined, and potentially staffed around-the-clock. Beginning his career as a gofer for Jim Stagg and Runyon at KYW, Stevens gained notoriety in 1965 when, at age 17, he became WIXY's music and production director. After playing "There's No Business Like Show Business" at 7 p.m. on March 4, 1975, the station re-launched as "M-105", with an album-oriented rock format alongside occasional Top 40 songs.

Mileti sold an 18 percent stake in Ohio Communications to Joe Zingale in August 1975, in exchange for the resolution of debt Mileti owed him. A former co-owner of WDOK-FM and WIXY, Zingale held a permit for a station on channel 19 and was Mileti's cousin and uncle by marriage to the Embrescias. By 1975, Zingale bought out the C. F. Kettering Company's stake in the stations. Combined Communications purchased WWWE from Mileti and Zingale on December 6, 1976, for $7.5 million; Combined previously attempted to buy WDOK-FM and WIXY from Globetrotters Communications. Zingale and Mileti retained majority control of WWWM and signed a 12-year consulting agreement with Combined. During the sale process, Combined agreed to merge with Globetrotters; to satisfy ownership restrictions, WMGC (the former WIXY) was sold to the Embrescias, d/b/a Embrescia Communications, who also purchased a minority stake in WWWM. WWWM's studios were moved from Park Centre to WDOK's former facilities on Euclid Avenue alongside WMGC, while WDOK moved to Park Centre.

WWWM's entry into the rock format came despite WMMS having a multi-year head start; WMMS had no direct competition since WNCR flipped from progressive rock to Top 40 in 1973. At launch, WWWM stressed a tight, easily accessible playlist of rock hits, and promoting their studio phone number for listener requests. The station also played continuous music without any commercials during its first two weekends on-air. Tom "T.R." Rezny joined "M-105" in 1975 and became a fixture throughout the format's existence. Bill Stallings also joined in 1975 and remained through 1981, most of his tenure in afternoon drive. Stevens considered WWWM to be "... a real Cleveland station who cares about Cleveland", owing to the station's airstaff all being from the area. David Spero, formerly with WNCR and WMMS and manager for The Michael Stanley Band, joined WWWM as morning host in 1978. Spero left after 18 months when the station began to further tighten its playlist.

The 1980 logo of M-105

The ratings rivalry between WWWM and WMMS caused both to move away further from progressive rock in the late 1970s; Stevens regarded "M-105" to be "an entertainment medium... we don't teach musical taste. Jazz, classical or other kinds of music don't fit our format." Stevens left the station in January 1980. Later that year, "M-105" began billing itself as "Cleveland's classic rock", playing a mix of rock music from the mid-1960s to the late 1970s, with a few current rock titles from veteran artists on its playlist. Arbitron ratings for WWWM in early 1982 showed the station at fourth place overall, but also the number two rock station behind WMMS, a role it consistently held from the beginning. The inability of WWWM to overtake WMMS in local ratings gave "M-105" a reputation of being a pale imitation of WMMS.

=== The "Diamond Man" and some "Majic" ===
Embrescia Communications sold WBBG and WWWM on July 20, 1981, to Robinson Communications Inc. for $6.2 million (equivalent to $22 million in 2025). Robinson Communications was led by local jeweler Larry Robinson, known as "The Diamond Man" on radio advertisements he starred in despite him not being a listener to contemporary music. The deal came after a proposed sale of WBBG to former Cleveland mayor Carl Stokes fell through; Stokes, who offered $1.5 million for WBBG, claimed to have an oral agreement with the Embrescias, who said, "the station is yours". Despite a petition to deny filed by Stokes and threats of a civil lawsuit, the FCC approved the deal on October 27, 1981. For Robinson, buying the two stations represented him investing back in Cleveland, "where my heart is". Robinson retained all management with the sale, including Tom and Jim Embrescia in their respective positions of president and executive vice president: while a newcomer to radio broadcasting, Robinson sought to apply the same business practices used at his jewelry business.

Reading between the lines, that means that WMJI or whatever it is called is now going after WGCL-FM and WZZP-FM instead of rock leader WMMS-FM. [Program director Mike] McVay claims that he wants to compete with WMMS-FM too, but such a diversity of competition is much like going after General Mills, General Dynamics and General Motors with a product called General Custer. Good luck.

— James Ewinger, The Plain Dealer

Speculation centered around Robinson making a format change for WWWM. Plain Dealer critic James Ewinger noted that, while WWWM's ratings were solid enough for other owners, Robinson was unlikely to accept second place in any endeavor, let alone a station unable to beat WMMS. After a $50,000 research study and contact with industry consultants, WWWM switched formats to soft adult contemporary as "Majic Radio" WMJI on June 14, 1982, reviving a brand WBBG previously used as WMGC. Only one on-air personality was retained. Former WWWE programmer Mike McVay was hired as WMJI's program director; by December 1982, he was elevated to operations manager for both stations.

The Summer 1982 Arbitrons showed WMJI at eighth place and WBBG, which flipped to adult standards one year earlier, at second place. The following Arbitron book placed WMJI at third place overall, overtaking WZZP, which previously had no in-market competition. By April 1984, WZZP re-launched as "Lite Rock 106 1/2" WLTF in response to WMJI's brand recognition; the WZZP calls were also still largely identified with their former disco format. Industry observers noted WMJI's launch came amid a significant promotional campaign and potentially caused some people to write "WMJI" in Arbitron diaries when they actually listened to WZZP. Dave Popovich, who replaced McVay as WMJI program director, left the station abruptly in October 1984 and was hired by WLTF in 1984 in the same capacity, while McVay now served as a consultant for WMJI. While Robinson's jewelry business was impacted by the early 1980s recession, WMJI and WBBG were his standout properties despite his unwillingness to buy additional stations.

=== Jacor ownership ===
Robinson sold WMJI and WBBG to Jacor Communications on September 19, 1984, for $13.18 million (equivalent to $40.8 million in 2025), double the amount paid to purchase the stations three years earlier. Robinson and associate Larry Pollock were shareholders in Jacor and, as the deal was largely composed of share warrants, could acquire more common stock in the company. For Jacor, the two stations were expected to double the company's annual revenue.

WMJI added the husband-and-wife team of Dan Deely and Kim Scott in March 1984 for mornings, the first time both had worked together at the same station. The pairing was one of many to emerge in Cleveland radio, inspired both by WMMS's Jeff Kinzbach and Ed Ferenc and the national success of Scott Shannon in New York City. Deely and Scott sought to resign from WMJI in February 1985 citing strains on their marriage, but were persuaded to stay after Robinson intervened, offering a raise and removing their Saturday shift. When former WGAR shock jock John Lanigan left WMGG in Tampa, Florida, after a format change, WMJI hired him for mornings on September 17, 1985, moving Deely to afternoons. Robinson, a fan of Lanigan, set up the deal so no one would be dismissed and Jacor would match or beat any other offer. Scott eventually re-teamed with Deely in afternoons but left the station by April 1986. Veteran newscaster John Webster, who worked previously at WERE and WHK, began interacting with Lanigan on-air as a sidekick and became his co-host.

I've been collecting crazy stories since I was 14. I would ask classmates if they had read the same funny stories in the newspaper that I had, and they would answer no. They accused me of making the stories up. Finding a way to prove what I told was true caused me to start clipping and saving the articles.

— Jimmy Malone

In 1985, Lanigan invited Jimmy Malone, a realtor who moonlit as a stand-up comedian, as a guest to perform his act of reading funny and weird news stories sourced from newspapers. The appearance was so successful that Malone was invited back the following week for what became titled "Knuckleheads in the News"; the weekly segment eventually inspired a tie-in book and "best-of" audio compilation. In addition to "Knuckleheads", by 1989, Malone became Deely's co-host in afternoon drive and hosted a Saturday morning show.

Jacor, which added clear-channel stations WLW in Cincinnati and KOA in Denver to their portfolio, began negotiating in early 1987 to purchase WWWE from Art Modell. Such a deal required the sale of WBBG, which had less-desirable demographics with adult standards; Jacor considered talk radio to be a more viable long-term format on the AM band. Larry Robinson agreed to re-purchase WBBG in July 1987 for $1.9 million, primarily to preserve the standards format. WWWE evening host Pete Franklin left to join WFAN in New York City, causing Jacor to withdraw their bid, and it and WDOK were purchased by a group led by Tom Embresica, Pollock, and associate Tom Wilson. Jacor switched WBBG to a simulcast of WMJI on October 29, 1987, after the sale to Robinson collapsed. Temporarily using the WMJI call sign during the simulcast, (Note: WMJI was legally known as WMJI-FM during this period.) 1260 AM was sold to Gore-Overgaard Broadcasting in June 1988 for $845,000 and was flipped to Christian radio as WRDZ; Jacor also continued to make unreturned solicitations for WWWE.

WMJI embraced the legacy of WBBG's predecessor, WIXY, which previously used the same studio facilities. In March 1987, WMJI aired a weekend-long tribute to WIXY, and by late September staged the first WIXY on-air reunion with former personalities, jingles and features. The station held subsequent WIXY reunions in 1988, 1989 and 1990. Denny Sanders, formerly the music director for WMMS and later with WNCX, joined WMJI in September 1988 for a nighttime oldies show, a move seen as a surprise given Sanders' reputation for recognizing new music. During a 13-week period in 1989, WQHS-TV simulcast Lanigan and Webster with in-studio cameras as part of a larger programming experiment conducted by Home Shopping Network's owned-station group.

=== Shift to oldies and Carl Hirsch ownership ===
Radio & Records reported in their April 4, 1990, issue that Legacy Broadcasting, led by Carl Hirsch and financier Robert F. X. Sillerman, was in talks to buy WMJI and WYHY-FM in Nashville from Jacor for $32 million (equivalent to $78.9 million in 2025), which The Plain Dealer confirmed the following day. A former Malrite and WMMS executive, Hirsch was credited for heading the launch of WHTZ "Z-100" in New York City, which went from obscurity to number one in their first ratings book. The deal provided Jacor with monetary relief: the company was seeking a financial restructuring on $12 million in debt and needed to raise $15 million in equities. The sale stirred rumors of possible shifts in air talent, including WWWE luring Lanigan and Webster and WMJI hiring Kinzbach and Ferenc away from WMMS; one local programmer told the Plain Dealer, "[WMMS] would be a Sohio station without Jeff and Flash".

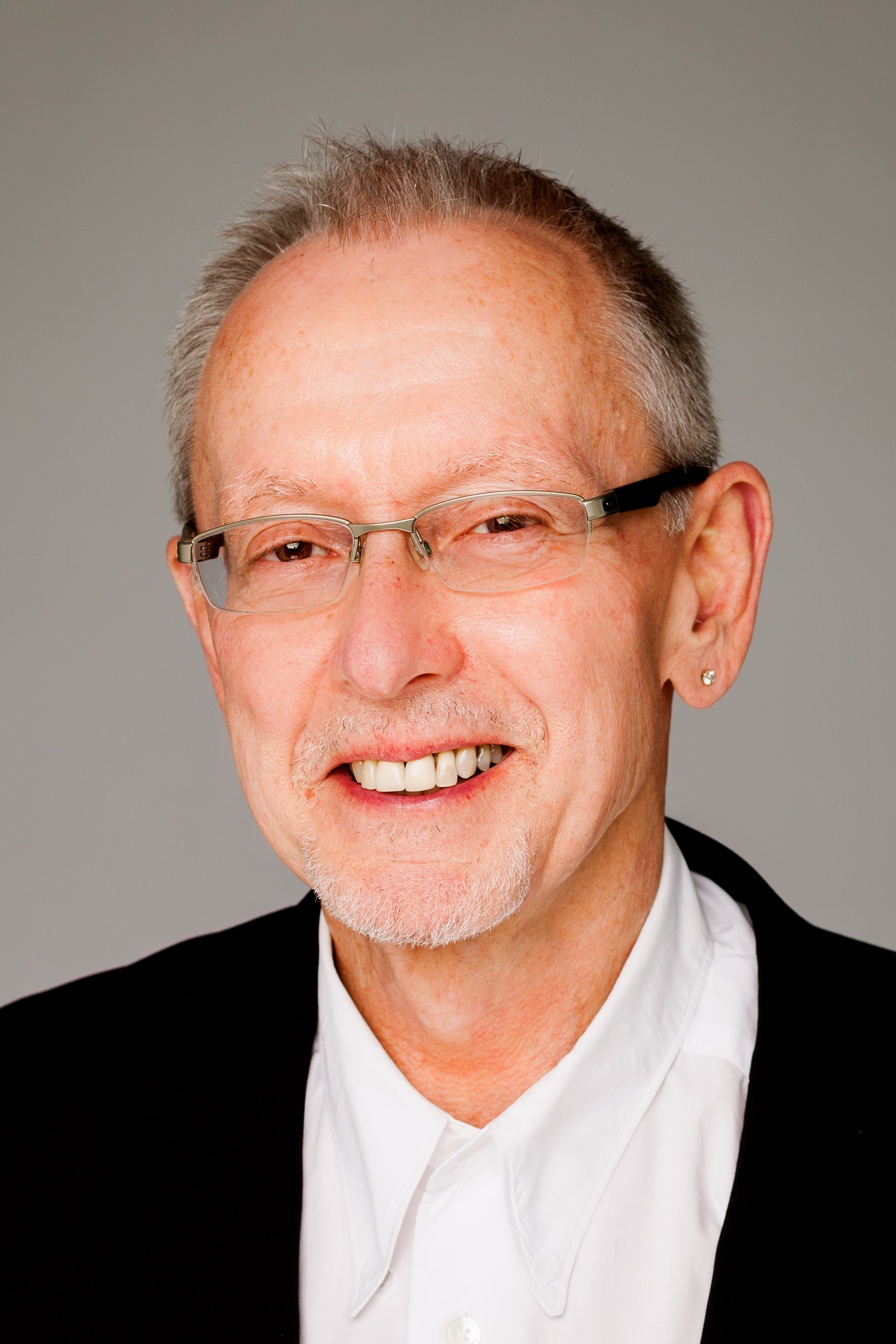
John Gorman, WMJI program director from 1991 to 1996

The deal was originally expected to close in the middle of September but delayed by Jacor to the end of the month. As September began, WMJI flipped to oldies and removed all post-1974 songs from their playlist; Cleveland had been the last remaining top 25-ranked radio market to not have an oldies station. Jacor cancelled the sale after the September 30, 1990, deadline passed, but restarted it at the end of October after Hirsch and Sillerman made a non-refundable payment of $3 million. Dean Thacker, former director of Malrite's radio division, was named WMJI general manager. Another delay in closing happened in mid-December as Legacy worked on a different finance package and followed their purchase of stations in Dallas, Houston and San Diego. John Gorman was hired as WMJI's program director, reuniting him with Hirsch, Thacker and Sanders, and was his first radio programming job since leaving WNCX in 1987. Hirsch, who with Thacker and Gorman departed Malrite on less-than-amicable terms, shipped to Malrite president Milt Maltz during the holiday season several WMMS Buzzard jars filled with Rolaids.

The deal finally closed on January 16, 1991, the same day Operation Desert Storm began; Gorman discovered WMJI had no network affiliation and promptly contracted with AP Radio for news updates. Gorman began upgrading the music library, much of which were monaural recordings on carts used by WIXY 20 years earlier, and considered the station to have been "... like a Third World country when we took over". David Helton, co-creator of the WMMS Buzzard, was hired to redesign the station's print logo. Ravenna Miceli and Scott Howitt were hired for weekend duties; by April, Howitt replaced Deely and by August, Miceli replaced Mike Ivers in middays. Malone was moved back to mornings in April, this time as a co-host of Lanigan, Webster and Malone. WMJI's studios moved to new facilities at in downtown Cleveland by June 1991; Hirsch saw the move as taking advantage of Cleveland's revitalization. Historian and author Norm N. Nite, described by the Plain Dealer's Jane Scott as "Cleveland's Dick Clark" hosted weekends at WMJI from 1990 to 1995.

After Malrite sold their radio division to Shamrock Broadcasting in August 1993, Hirsch, through a sister company OmniAmerica, purchased WMMS and WHK from Shamrock on November 2, 1993, for $12 million (equivalent to $26.7 million in 2025), creating the first in-market FM duopoly. WMJI's license was concurrently transferred to OmniAmerica. Upon the deal's close in April 1994, Gorman became WMMS's program director, a position he previously held from 1973 to 1986, while continuing oversight of WMJI.

Under Gorman's guidance, WMJI immediately posted major ratings increases, placing third behind WMMS and WLTF despite a minimal marketing budget. By 1993, WMJI was besting contemporary rock stations; as Gorman told the Plain Dealer, "the only thing old about WMJI is the music". Within a year after moving to middays, Miceli took the number one rating in both the 25–54 and 35–64 demographics, with the daily "Biz-to-Biz Trivia" game show—pitting area businesses against each other—an additional hit. Lanigan, Webster and Malone was refocused to a talk show without any music, and was noted for the diversity among the co-hosts, with Lanigan's conservative views contrasting against Malone's liberal beliefs. Lanigan actively competed against The Howard Stern Show on WNCX, which went from thirteenth place to number one in Arbitron within 18 months of its debut. An on-air "funeral" Stern staged in Cleveland for Lanigan and the WMMS Buzzard on June 10, 1994, became notorious when a WMMS engineer severed a transmission line during the broadcast. (Note: See WMMS § The Cleveland Funeral.)

=== The Majic Moondog Coronation Ball ===
WMJI staged their first "Majic Moondog Coronation Ball" on March 21, 1992, the 40th anniversary of the Moondog Coronation Ball, regarded as the first rock and roll concert. Among the headliners were Paul Williams (who also performed at the first Moondog), Jerry Butler and The Impressions, The Diamonds, Clarence "Frogman" Henry and Little Anthony and the Imperials. The "Majic Moondog" had roots in the "Moondog Coronation Ball II" WMMS staged on March 21, 1986, headlined by Chuck Berry and was part of Cleveland's lobbying to land the Rock and Roll Hall of Fame; WMMS also sponsored a "Moondog III" on March 21, 1987. WMJI and promoter Canterbury Productions staged subsequent "Majic Moondogs" in 1993, 1994 and 1995; the 1993 concert was also simulcast over the Voice of America.

When Canterbury Productions attempted to stage a "Moondog Coronation Ball" for WDOK and WRMR (850 AM) in March 1996, OmniAmerica sued claiming Canterbury was stealing the name for a rival stations' event; Canterbury claimed OmniAmerica had a breach of contract by failing to promote a November 1995 concert. Federal Judge Donald C. Nugent issued a temporary restraining order against Canterbury and WDOK on February 20, 1996, forcing their concert to be re-branded the "Alan Freed Birthday Ball", emceed by Alan's brother, David Freed, who along with the Freed family claimed ownership of the "Moondog" name. Freed's family sued both OmniAmerica and Canterbury, but Freed's daughter Alana Freed hosted a second "Alan Freed Birthday Ball" staged by Canterbury in May 1997; by then, WMJI asserted all rights to the "Moondog" name. WMJI continued staging "Majic Moondog Coronation Balls" on an annual basis through 2017.

=== Purchases by Nationwide, Jacor and Clear Channel ===
I don't have any regrets at all about selling the stations, because it was a solid and logical business move. But sometimes, I do feel like I have some unfulfilled goals when it comes to Cleveland radio. I wouldn't rule anything in or out.

— Carl Hirsch, after selling WMJI and WMMS to Nationwide Communications

On April 22, 1996, Hirsch sold WMJI and WMMS to Nationwide Communications for $43.5 million (equivalent to $89.3 million in 2025) and WOMX-FM in Orlando. (Note: WHK was sold separately to Salem Communications two days later.) Hirsch saw the pickup of WOMX as a chance to dominate in that market, but also said, "make no mistake: after this sale, Nationwide is going to own radio in Cleveland". Hirsch told Broadcasting & Cable the swap occurred after he was unable to purchase additional stations in Cleveland; Hirsch previously attempted to merge OmniAmerica into Citicasters in August 1995, but that was called off several months later. Nationwide, who took over on July 1 via a local marketing agreement, appointed separate general managers for WMMS and WMJI, intending to run them autonomously. Gorman resigned after being notified he needed to choose between one station or the other, and took a honeymoon with Miceli, who he recently married. Sanders was appointed to succeed Gorman as program director and said, "I'm not some corporate hack looking to change things just to say I changed them".

Multiple changes were made at the start of Sanders' tenure. The station hired Billy Bass, a veteran of WIXY, WNCR and WMMS, for evenings in August 1997, marking his first major on-air role in radio since 1972. Despite Miceli's continued high ratings at WMJI, her long-term status was in doubt after Gorman joined CBS Radio in Detroit and rumors of her having resentment at management over his departure. Miceli left in September 1997 and was replaced by Daune Robinson, a former sports reporter for WKNR (1220 AM). John Webster underwent surgery to remove a brain lesion in December 1996, and had a reduced presence on Lanigan, Webster and Malone throughout 1997. Webster retired on November 24; the same day, the Plain Dealer reported WMJI management had been "coaxing" him to leave and were negotiating over a future role. Webster's retirement came as the station released a third "Knuckleheads in the News" audio compilation distributed by Cleveland International Records. The show was renamed Lanigan and Malone, and Webster's newscaster role was assumed by Chip Kullik. A final WIXY reunion took place in October 1997 at the Cuyahoga County Fairgrounds, run in conjunction with the first Ghoulardifest.

These coincided with Nationwide putting itself up for sale, spurred on by industry consolidation in the wake of the Telecommunications Act of 1996. Nationwide sold itself to Jacor—who re-entered the market earlier in the year with their purchase of WTAM and WLTF (Note: WLTF was renamed WMVX on October 17, 1997.)—on October 27, 1997, for $620 million (equivalent to $1.24 billion in 2025). (Note: WKNR, which Jacor was also purchasing at the time, was spun off to complete the deal.) The deal closed on August 10, 1998; only 59 days later, Jacor agreed to be purchased by Clear Channel Communications on October 8, 1998, for $3.5 billion (equivalent to $6.72 billion in 2025). During Jacor ownership, WMJI, WGAR and WMMS's news departments were merged into WTAM, and all three stations began airing WTAM-produced newscasts. WMJI won its first NAB Marconi Radio Award in 1998 for Large Market Station of the Year; Lanigan was also nominated for Large Market Personality of the Year. WMJI became the co-flagship for the Cleveland Browns Radio Network in January 1999 after Jacor won a bidding war for the broadcasts, effective with the 1999 season; WMJI was chosen as it had the largest coverage area for an FM station in Cleveland and the second-largest in Ohio.

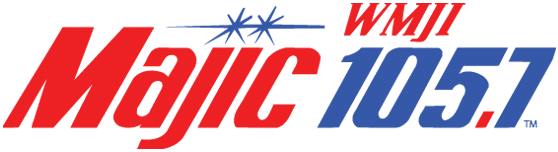
WMJI logo used from 1991 to 2022

Billy Bass was dismissed on June 1, 1999, in what was an economic move attributed to the recent consolidation. Sanders returned to host evenings but through voice-tracking. This occurred as Clear Channel started to utilize Prophet, allowing an entire airshift to be recorded in minutes. Bass joined WZJM, which flipped from Top 40 to rhythmic oldies earlier in the year. Policies were enacted throughout the company substantially limiting on-air chatter by talent to brief remarks in-between songs: weekend host Luther Heggs resigned in September 1999 despite not having been on the air since July, claiming the policies risked making him "part of the electronic wallpaper being broadcast over a glorified jukebox". Clear Channel entered WMJI into a cross-promotional agreement with WKYC in March 2000; Shane Hollett, WMJI's meteorologist since 1991, resigned on-air after his reports were now required to be called "Channel 3 forecasts", conflicting with his weekend duties at WEWS-TV.

WMJI remained competitive in the ratings, finishing either at the top or competitive with co-owned WGAR and WTAM, with Lanigan and Malone trading places with Howard Stern on WNCX. Clear Channel unveiled plans in August 2000 to move all their stations, including WMJI, to a combined facility at the former Centerior Energy headquarters in Independence, moving 200 jobs from the various studios around downtown Cleveland.

=== Downsizing, transitions and after-effects ===
The consolidation of [radio station] ownership is still far less than it is in the automobile business, the television business or the newspaper business. Where's the competition in the newspaper business? There's the same number of radio stations available to people in Cleveland, but, damn, I love that afternoon newspaper.

— Kevin Metheny, Clear Channel regional vice president of programming, 2002

Six on-air personalities at Clear Channel's Cleveland stations, including Sanders and Howitt, were fired on February 13, 2001, during a round of downsizing attributed to the early 2000s recession. Howitt was replaced by Mike Ivers, who was transferred from WGAR-FM, while Dave Popovich, who became WMVX's program director and "brand manager" for Clear Channel's "Mix" stations one week earlier, took over for Sanders. Sanders later became general manager for The Telos Alliance. Daune Robinson subsequently left the station to co-host the morning show at WFHM-FM, which launched in July 2001 on 95.5 FM after a multi-station asset swap. The Browns radio rights were transferred to WMMS for the 2001 season in an attempt to help boost that station's ratings.

Kevin Metheny joined Clear Channel in 1998, originally as WTAM operations manager; by 2000, Metheny had programming oversight throughout the cluster and WMJI itself. Metheny was tasked with administering Clear Channel's downsizing rounds while overseeing the Independence studio integration. A 2002 Plain Dealer story called the arrangement—with WMJI's Lanigan and Malone next to WMVX's Brian and Joe and WTAM's Mike Trivisonno—as "a food court of radio, with McDonald's, Burger King and Taco Bell". Metheny took an indifferent attitude with handling the cluster's talent, saying, "if you're a John Lanigan or a Mike Trivisonno, you don't invest a lot of capital in the new programmer, because we usually last about 45 minutes". Metheny left Clear Channel in 2008. Keith Abrams replaced Metheny as operations manager and WMJI program director, later overseeing all of Clear Channel/iHeartMedia's classic hits stations; Abrams was dismissed in December 2020 during a large-scale downsizing.

Despite the changes, WMJI still remained the highest-billing station in Clear Channel's Cleveland cluster: in 2001, the cluster's six stations (Note: WMJI, WMMS, WGAR-FM, WTAM, WMVX and WAKS.) had a combined profit of $59.5 million, while WMJI itself earned $16.8 million. The station won additional Marconi Awards throughout the 2000s: for Oldies Station of the Year in 2002, 2004 and 2006; Large Market Station of the Year in 2003; and Large Market Personality of the Year for Lanigan and Malone in 2005. Throughout the 2010s, WMJI's playlist remained predominantly in the 1970s with select 1960s songs, which ran contrary to other large-market classic hits stations shifting to playing primarily 1980s music; this was to accommodate WHLK (renamed from WMVX in 2011) and their adult hits format centered around 1980s hits.

Chuck Collier—associated with WGAR since the 1970s and that station's afternoon host and music director—began voice-tracking middays for WMJI in 2007. Collier handled both airshifts until his September 23, 2011, death at age 64. Former WKYC newscaster Mark Nolan joined WMJI for middays in January 2012, succeeding Collier; Nolan had previously been a fill-in host on WMJI in the late 1990s. Lanigan announced his retirement on January 24, 2014, with Nolan named as his successor. After a week-long sendoff that included headlining the Majic Moondog Coronation Ball, Lanigan's final broadcast took place on March 31, 2014, with Malone, Kullik and Tracey Carroll remaining as Nolan's co-hosts. WGAR evening host Kat Jackson replaced Nolan in middays via voice-tracking. Don "Action" Jackson became WMJI's afternoon host in late 2001 and remained in the role until January 2020, when he was part of a large-scale downsizing tied to organizational restructuring at iHeartMedia.

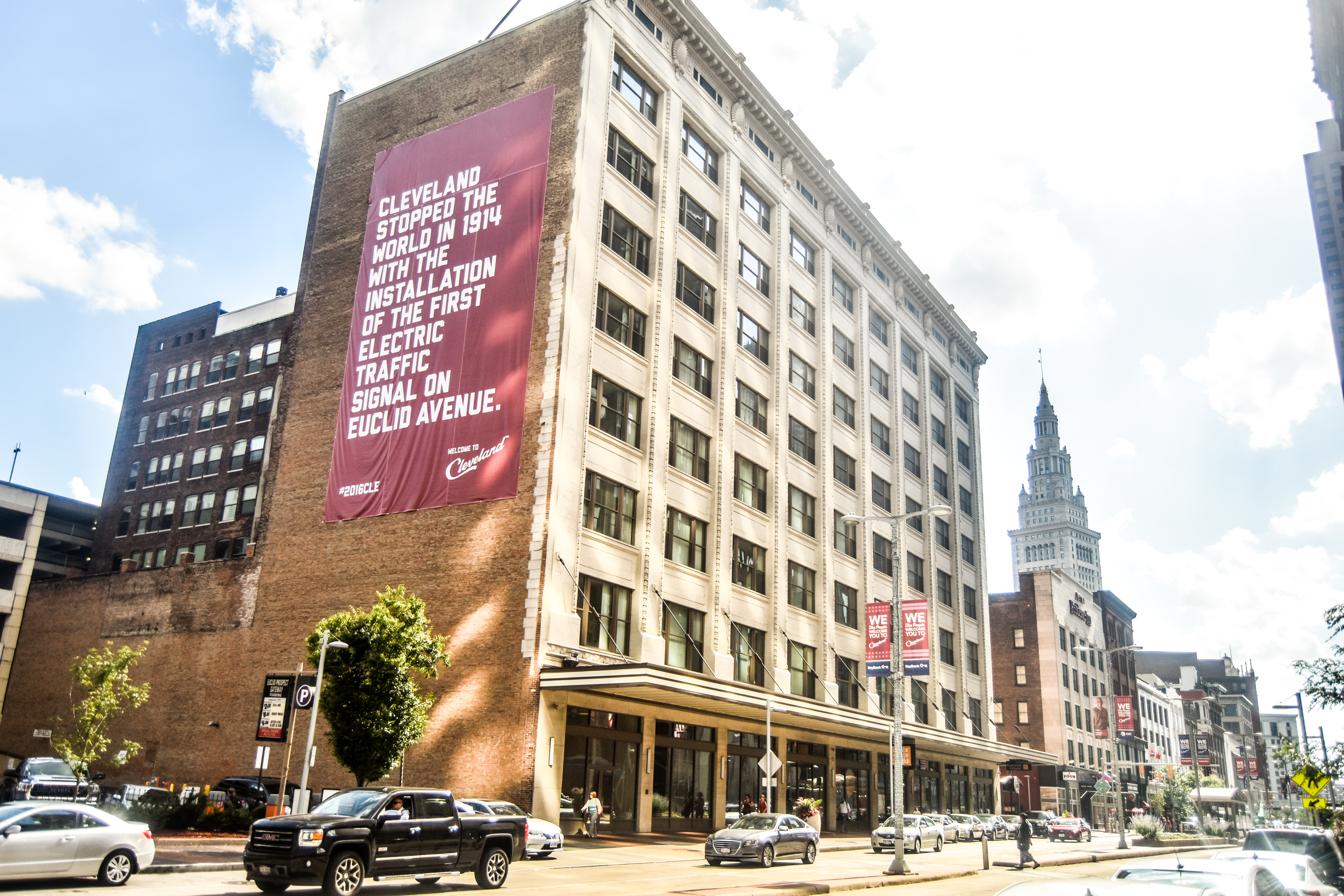
The Six Six Eight building in downtown Cleveland (pictured in 2016), home to iHeartMedia's Cleveland stations since 2022

iHeartMedia announced plans on March 21, 2021, to move WMJI and the other iHeartMedia Cleveland stations to a new combined studio/office facility at the Six Six Eight building in downtown Cleveland, using cloud storage technology. The relocation process was completed in July 2022.

Malone, Carroll and Kullik were removed from the morning show on February 2, 2021; Malone was retained for a weekend show on WMJI and a daily show on WARF, while Nolan was teamed with Jen Picciano and Krystle Elyse for a relaunched The Mark Nolan Show in mornings. Kat Jackson was replaced in January 2022 with a syndicated show hosted by Martha Quinn cleared by all iHeartMedia classic hits stations. In July 2026, WKDD morning host Keith Kennedy replaced Nolan in mornings, and Nolan was moved to afternoons. Kennedy, who is also regional senior vice president of programming for iHeartMedia's Cleveland cluster, continues to voice-track for WGAR and WKDD. The switch coincided with Nolan joining WOIO/WUAB as an anchor for their morning newscasts.

== Current programming ==
Local personalities on WMJI include Keith Kennedy and Jen Picciano in mornings, and Mark Nolan in afternoons. Martha Quinn's syndicated show airs in middays, while other talent is voice-tracked.

Since 2011, WMJI plays Christmas music annually during the holiday season, competing against WDOK and, until 2024, WFHM-FM. WMJI has enjoyed high ratings during Nielsen's December and holiday books, setting records in 2024 and 2025. WMJI's 19.8 share during the 2025 holiday book, following WFHM's switch to K-Love, is an all-time ratings record since Arbitron and Nielsen began measuring the market in 1965.

WMJI has broadcast in HD Radio since April 25, 2006; the HD2 subchannel currently carries K-Love Eras.

== FM translator ==
WMJI-HD2 is additionally relayed over the following low-power translator:

Broadcast translator for WMJI-HD2
Call sign	Frequency	City of license	FID	ERP (W)	HAAT	Class	FCC info
W279BT	103.7 FM	Cleveland, Ohio	153187	250	184.33 m (605 ft)	D	LMS
