= WTAM =

Clear-channel news/talk radio station in Cleveland

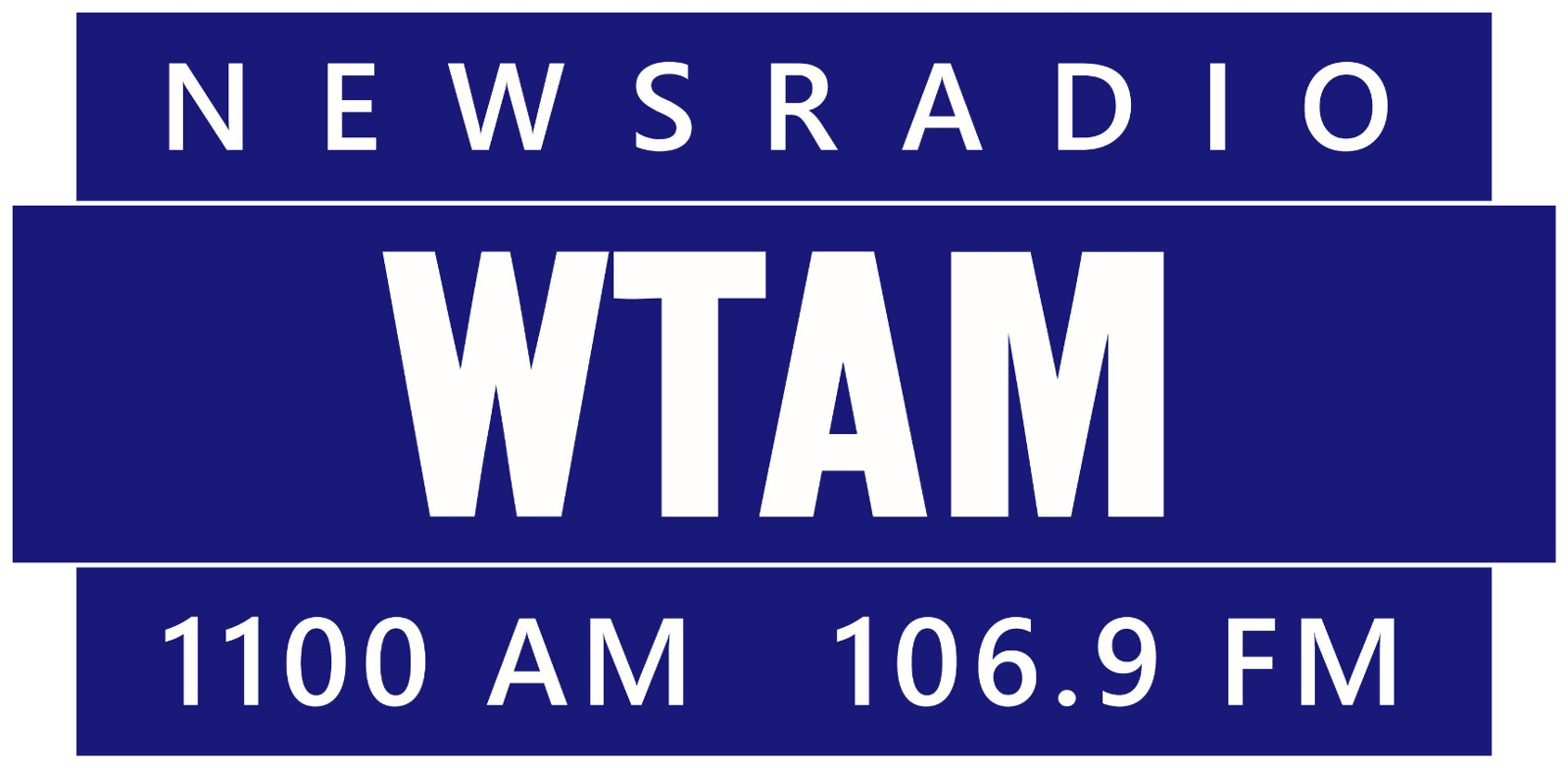

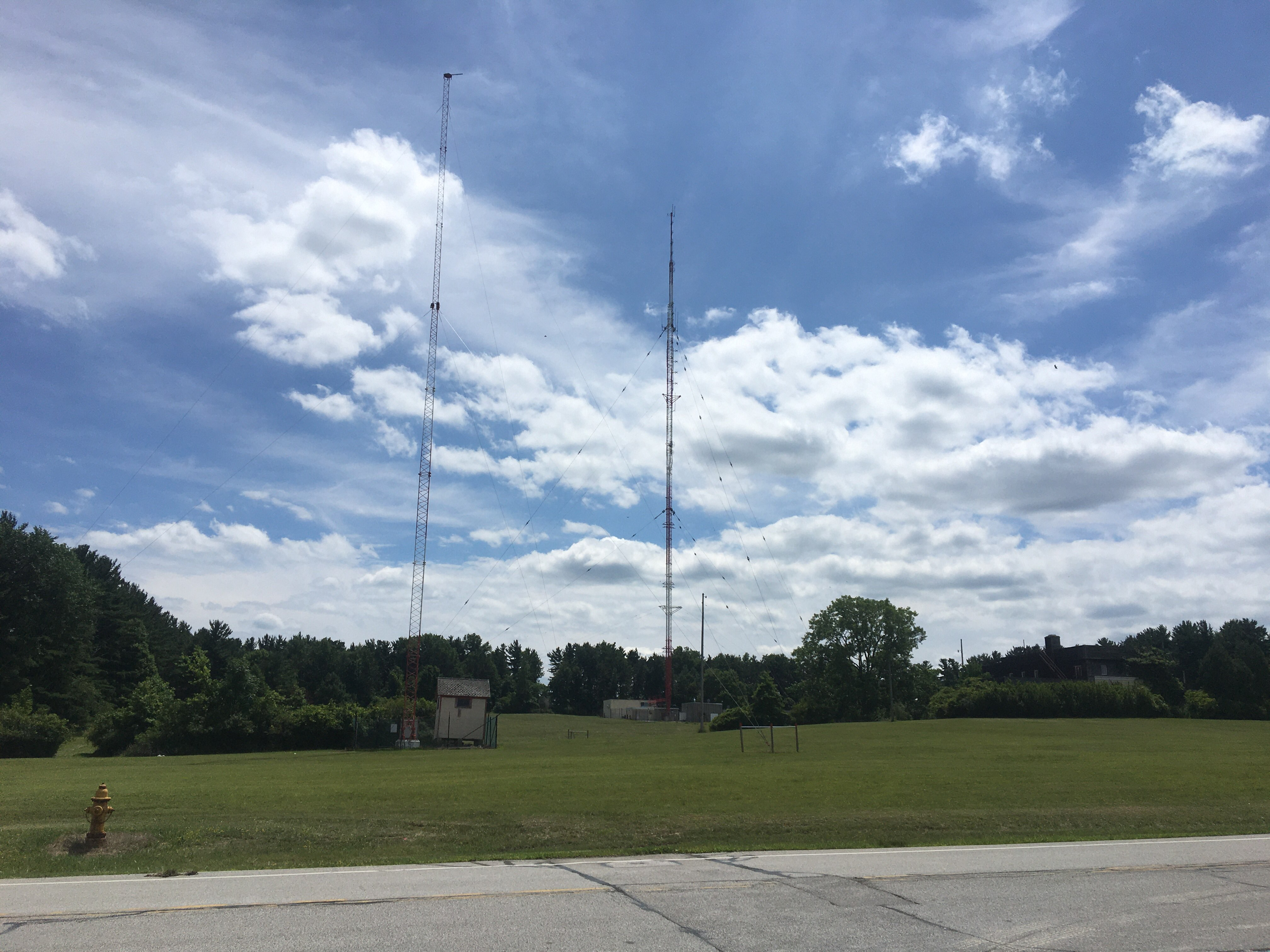
- WTAM's broadcast tower in Brecksville, with a backup tower in the foreground. The original transmitter building is to the far right.
- Cleveland, Ohio; United States
- Broadcast area: Greater Cleveland; Northeast Ohio
- Frequency: 1100 kHz
- Branding: Newsradio WTAM 1100

Programming
- Format: Talk radio; sports radio
- Affiliations: ABC News Radio; Fox News Radio; Premiere Networks

Ownership
- Owner: iHeartMedia; (iHM Licenses, LLC)
- Sister stations: WAKS; WARF; WGAR-FM; WHLK; WMJI; WMMS

History
- First air date: September 26, 1923
- Former call signs: WTAM (1923–1956); KYW (1956–1965); WKYC (1965–1972); WWWE (1972–1996)
- Former frequencies: 750 kHz (1923–1926); 770 kHz (1926–1927); 1070 kHz (1927–1941)
- Call sign meaning: AM band

Technical information
- Licensing authority: FCC
- Facility ID: 59595
- Class: A
- Power: 50,000 watts unlimited
- Transmitter coordinates: 41°16′50.2″N 81°37′21.44″W
- Translator: 106.9 W295DE (Cleveland)

Links
- Public license information: Public file; LMS
- Webcast: Listen live (via iHeartRadio)
- Website: wtam.iheart.com

WTAM (1100 AM) is a commercial radio station licensed to Cleveland, Ohio, that airs a news/talk and sports radio format, commonly known as "Newsradio WTAM 1100". Owned by iHeartMedia, WTAM serves Greater Cleveland and much of surrounding Northeast Ohio, and is a clear-channel station with extended nighttime range. WTAM is also Northeast Ohio's primary entry point station in the Emergency Alert System.

The station first carried the WTAM call letters from 1923 to 1956; assigned sequentially by the U.S. Department of Commerce, the letters were later treated as a backronym for "Where The Artisans Meet". Founded by Willard Storage Battery and later owned by Cleveland Electric Illuminating and the Van Sweringen brothers as the 1920s ended, WTAM was purchased by RCA in 1930, becoming a core station in the NBC Radio Network. NBC sold WTAM, FM adjunct WTAM-FM (105.7) and TV adjunct WNBK (channel 3), to Westinghouse Broadcasting in 1956 in exchange for their AM and TV stations in Philadelphia, whereupon the Cleveland properties assumed the KYW calls. That sale was ultimately reversed in 1965, with NBC returning and all three Cleveland stations renamed as WKYC. Sold to Cleveland entrepreneur Nick Mileti in 1972, WKYC became "3WE" WWWE, carrying a mixture of middle of the road and sports play-by-play, in particular the Cleveland Indians and Cleveland Cavaliers (both owned at the time by Mileti) and Pete Franklin's Sportsline talk show.

The station adopted its current talk radio format in 1985 after being purchased by a syndicate headed by Art Modell and Al Lerner; a subsequent sale took WWWE's talk programming into a controversial direction with Gary Dee and Bruce Drennan, at one point putting the station's license into question. Booth American (later Secret Communications) took over WWWE in 1990, revamping the lineup several times and hiring Mike Trivisonno as Sportsline host in 1994, later moving him to afternoon drive to much success. WWWE re-adopted the WTAM call letters in 1996 to reinforce the station's position on the AM band; station management considered the historical tie "a nice bonus, but... more incidental than anything else". Purchased by Jacor in 1997, WTAM has been owned by Clear Channel since 1999, renamed iHeartMedia in 2014.

WTAM is the Cleveland affiliate for both ABC News Radio and Fox News Radio; the AM flagship for the Cavaliers AudioVerse and Cleveland Guardians Radio Network; and the market outlet for The Glenn Beck Program, The Clay Travis and Buck Sexton Show and Coast to Coast AM. Studios for WTAM are located in the Six Six Eight Building in downtown Cleveland's Gateway District and the transmitter is located south of Cleveland in Brecksville. Besides its main analog transmission, WTAM simulcasts over low-power analog Cleveland translator W295DE (106.9 FM), and streams online via iHeartRadio.

== History ==
=== WTAM (1923–1956) ===
==== Early years ====
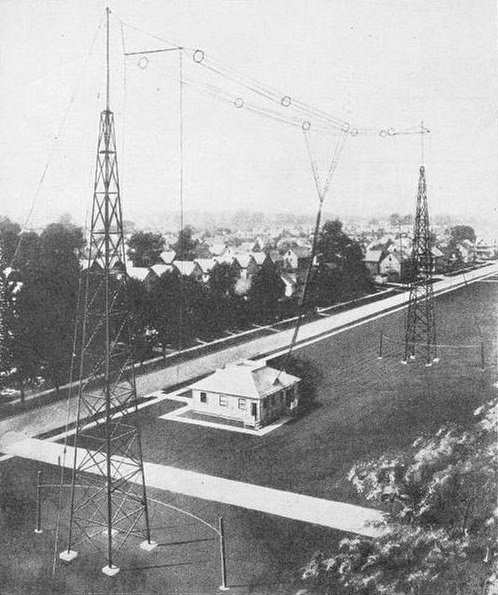
Original WTAM transmitter site (1923)

WTAM began broadcast operations on September 26, 1923. It was one of several stations that started between 1922 and 1923 with a call sign assigned sequentially by the Commerce Department with "W" as the first letter and "A" as the third. It was originally owned by S.E. Lawrence and Theodore Willard, in the name of the Willard Storage Battery Company; Willard later claimed to the Akron Beacon Journal that he sought "WSBC" to represent his company or "WTAW" for his initials, but neither were available, and WTAM was the closest choice. Initially the station only offered three hours of nightly programming, but soon expanded its on-air lineup. Studios were located in the Willard factory on Taft Avenue at East 131st Street. By June 30, 1924, WTAM was broadcasting with 1,000 watts and sharing the 770 kHz frequency with WJAX.

WJAX had signed on earlier in 1922, owned by the Union Trust Co. In 1924 it was known as the "Wave from Lake Erie". The Goodyear Tire and Rubber Company purchased WJAX in 1925 and changed to the callsign to WEAR. Finally, Willard Battery purchased WEAR to have control of shared frequency allocation.

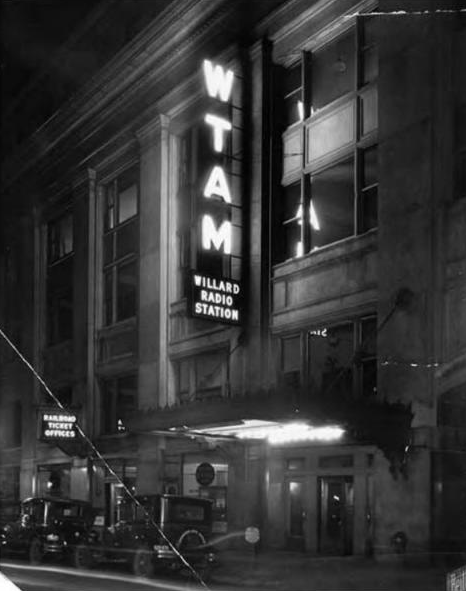
WTAM studios in Union Trust Building circa 1926

WTAM was the first radio station to broadcast coverage of a political convention when it covered the 1924 Republican National Convention at Cleveland's Public Auditorium from June 10–12, 1924. The station's power increased to 2,500 watts in 1925 and to 3,500 watts in 1926, as the studios moved to the Union Trust Building (now The 925 Building). By June 30, 1927, WTAM and WEAR broadcast on 750 kHz with WTAM broadcasting with 3,500 watts. The January 31, 1928, Radio Service Bulletin of the Commerce Department listed WTAM broadcasting with 3,500 watts at night and 5,000 watts during the day.

==== Clear-channel status ====
After Willard Battery threatened to close the station, WTAM and WEAR were purchased by the Cleveland Electric Illuminating Company (now part of FirstEnergy) and the Van Sweringen brothers on May 31, 1928. In a statement announcing the purchase, the new owners declared, "Recognizing the fact that this radio station is a civic asset to the Greater Cleveland district and that the cessation of its operation would be a real loss, the Van Sweringen interests and the Illuminating Co. entered into arrangements to continue it. Every effort will be made to maintain the station on a plane which will make it of maximum value to the community."

When the new Federal Radio Commission instituted General Order 40 after the passage of the Radio Act of 1927, WTAM along with sister station WEAR (at that point absorbed into WTAM entirely) claimed the clear channel frequency allocated to Cleveland, and on November 11, 1928, it began broadcasting at 1070 kHz with WTAM broadcasting at 50,000 watts. In 1929 the station built two broadcast towers in Brecksville, Ohio, each 200 feet high.

==== The NBC years ====
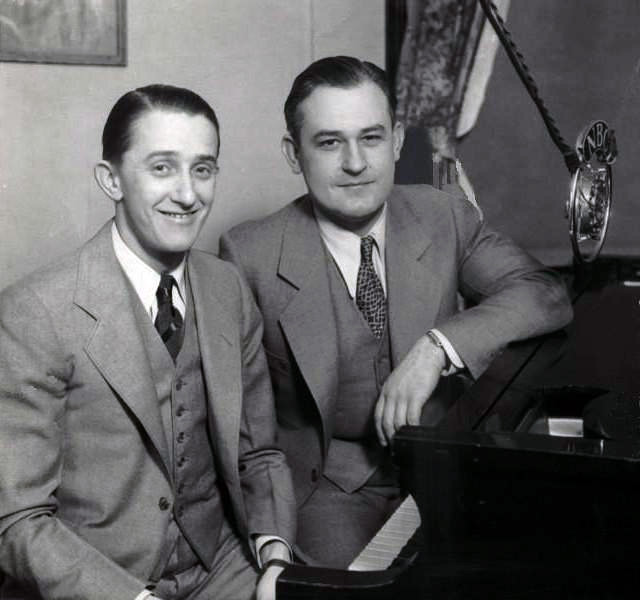
Gene Carroll and Glenn Rowell in 1935

With its national prominence as a clear channel giant established, WTAM became a valuable radio property. NBC purchased WTAM on October 16, 1930, and the studios were moved to the Auditorium Building. The station became a major link in the NBC Red Network, contributing some programming to the network. Around 1930, Gene Carroll and Glenn Rowell brought their vaudeville humor to WTAM with the Gene and Glenn show. The duo became famous for their characters "Jake & Lena". WTAM originated the program for nationwide broadcast on the NBC Red Network, and it aired six days a week for five years. WTAM also originated the venerable Lum and Abner show on the NBC Red Network five days a week during one year of its run from May 22, 1933, to March 30, 1934, sponsored by the Ford Dealers of America.

NBC began to make substantial investments to station facilities in the 1930s. WTAM moved their studio operations to 815 Superior Avenue on February 7, 1937; renamed the NBC Building, it is known today as the Superior Building. That same year, a new tower was built in Brecksville which was 480 feet tall. On March 29, 1941, with the implementation of NARBA, WTAM moved its broadcast frequency from 1070 to 1100 kHz, maintaining its clear-channel status.

During the 1940s, the station continued to contribute some programming to the NBC radio network. On March 19, 1946, Bob Hope brought his Tuesday night 10 pm Pepsodent radio show to Cleveland along with Jerry Colonna, Frances Langford and the Skinnay Ennis Orchestra for a broadcast on the NBC radio network. Guests included Ohio Governor Frank Lausche. Recordings of this program are still available from collectors of old radio programs.

WTAM also broadcast the 1948 World Series games of the Cleveland Indians against the Boston Braves, with announcers Jim Britt and Mel Allen. In 1951, WTAM originated an NBC Radio Network broadcast of the Cleveland Orchestra.

NBC also expanded its broadcasting interests in Cleveland beyond AM radio: on October 31, 1948, NBC launched a sister television outlet, WNBK, on channel 4; a few weeks later, on December 6, 1948, WTAM-FM 105.7 began broadcasting, simulcasting WTAM's programming. All three stations shared the same transmitter tower in Brecksville until WNBK moved to a new transmitter tower erected in Parma concurrent with a channel switch to channel 3 on April 25, 1954; as KYW and KYW-FM, both radio stations would move to the same Parma tower in February 1957.

WTAM also aired Cleveland Browns games during the 1952, 1953, and 1955 seasons; Jim Graner provided color commentary during the 1955 season.

=== KYW: The Westinghouse years ===
In late 1955, NBC persuaded Westinghouse to trade its Philadelphia stations, KYW (1060 AM) and WPTZ-TV, in return for NBC's Cleveland properties and $3 million in cash compensation. NBC had long wanted to own a station in Philadelphia, the nation's third-largest market at the time. The swap went into effect on January 22, 1956. Westinghouse wanted to keep the historic KYW callsign, which had been Chicago's oldest radio facility before being transferred to Philadelphia on December 3, 1934. Therefore, on February 13, 1956, the Cleveland stations became KYW, KYW-FM and KYW-TV; and the Philadelphia stations became WRCV and WRCV-TV.

In the early 1960s, under program director Ken Draper, KYW, known on-air as KY11, became a full service - Top 40 powerhouse with disc jockeys Jim Runyon (the "weeeellll" voice of the Chickenman series), Jim Stagg, Jay Lawrence, Jerry G (Jerry Ghan), and the morning duo of Harry Martin and Specs Howard. Its main Top 40 rival in the Cleveland market was "Color Channel 14" WHK, at 1420 AM.

Almost immediately after the trade was finalized, Westinghouse complained to the Federal Communications Commission (FCC) and the Justice Department about NBC's coercion. It was discovered that Westinghouse only agreed to the trade when NBC made implications that it would pull its television programming from WPTZ and Westinghouse's other NBC affiliate, WBZ-TV in Boston. In 1964, after a protracted legal battle, the FCC ordered the swap of stations reversed without NBC realizing any profit on the deal. NBC regained control of the Cleveland stations on June 19, 1965, and changed their call letters to WKYC, WKYC-FM and WKYC-TV, which kept the popular "KY" slogan and identity Westinghouse brought into Cleveland.

To this day, the KYW stations insist that they "moved" to Cleveland in 1956 and "returned" to Philadelphia in 1965, but the two stations' facilities and broadcast licenses remained the same.

=== WKYC years ===
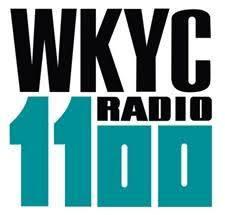
1960s logo as WKYC

WKYC continued as a Top 40 outlet—the only such-formatted station under NBC ownership—with personalities Harry Martin, Specs Howard, Jay Lawrence and Jerry G holding over from KYW/Westinghouse. When program director Ken Draper left for WCFL in Chicago in early 1965, prior to the ownership change, both Jim Stagg and Jim Runyon wasted no time following him. Bill Winters came in about this time. Jim LaBarbara was wooed away from a three-day stint at WIXY to do evening prime time. Chuck Dann signed on, as did Charlie and Harrigan (Jack Woods and Paul Menard), the morning duo at KLIF (1190 AM) in Dallas. Jim Gallant was doing overnights.

In late 1966, popular afternoon host Jerry G also decided to follow Draper to WCFL; upon his departure, he added the last name "Bishop", and later created the TV horror host persona Svengoolie. He was replaced by WIXY's evening man Jack Armstrong, who then decided to call himself "Big Jack, Your Leader"; LaBarbara was moved to overnight to accommodate Armstrong's installation as the evening jock. In early 1967, the on air staff consisted of: LaBarbara, overnight; Charlie and Harrigan, morning drive; Bob Cole, late morning; Jay Lawrence, mid afternoons; Chuck Dann, afternoon drive; and Big Jack in the prime time slot.

WKYC "Radio 11" was a large record-selling influence as far away as New York City and Miami. However, its main local competition in those days was WIXY (1260 AM; "Super Radio"). Unlike WIXY, WKYC – being an NBC owned-and-operated station in a situation not unlike WRC (980 AM) in Washington – was obligated to carry all NBC Radio programming such as the weekend Monitor, as well as all top-of-the-hour NBC Radio newscasts. The NBC Radio afternoon daily network news feed was also based from WKYC's studios and anchored by Virgil Dominic, who also served as WKYC-TV's lead news anchor.

On February 1, 1968, at 3:05 pm, following an NBC Radio newscast, the station altered its presentation to Power Radio, a derivative of the Drake-Chenault-created "Boss Radio" Top-40 format, programmed for WKYC by Hal Moore. The new sound emphasized "more music" with less chatter between songs and a tighter playlist. Personalities at that time included Charlie and Harrigan, Bob Shannon, Chuck Dunaway, Lee 'Baby' Sims, Fred Winston, and Buddy Harrison. It remained a Top 40 station until February 1, 1969, when WKYC switched to an easy listening/middle of the road (MOR) format. Specs Howard left WKYC shortly thereafter, with Jim Runyon returning to succeed him in morning drive.

Following rumors that NBC was interested in divesting some or all of their radio stations, NBC sold both WKYC and WKYC-FM to Ohio Communications, headed by sports franchiser Nick Mileti and investment firm C. F. Kettering, for approximately $5.5 million in a deal announced January 12, 1972. Broadcast executives Tom and Jim Embrescia joined the ownership group as vice-president/general manager and sales manager, respectively.

=== WWWE years ===
==== Full service and country years ====
The AM radio station's call letters were changed to WWWE (purportedly for Embrescia or Entertainment) and adopted the 3WE brand; WKYC-FM became WWWM (purportedly for Mileti or Music); both changes took place on November 16, 1972. WWWE retained WKYC's easy listening/MOR format, but also added radio broadcasts for both the Cleveland Indians and Cleveland Cavaliers as Mileti owned both teams; WERE (1300 AM) had previously served as the flagship for both. Pete Franklin also joined the station from WERE and hosted Sportsline, a five-hour long weeknight sports call-in show that also followed Indians and Cavaliers games, quickly becoming a legend with his acerbic personality, boasting that the station's nighttime signal could be heard in "over 38 states and half of Canada".

Following Jim Runyon's sudden departure and death from cancer in April 1973, the morning drive shift was taken over by Larry Morrow, formerly of WIXY; Morrow would be joined by Joe Tait as morning sportscaster, Tait also served as the lead play-by-play voice for both the Indians and Cavaliers. In addition to Franklin, Morrow and Tait, the daytime lineup included at one time or another, Phil McLean, Al James, Jim Davis, Jack Reynolds, Tony Matthews, Jeff Elliot, Johnny Andrews, Lanny Wheeler, Lee Andrews, Ted Alexander and Bill King.

Both WWWE and WWWM slowly severed the last remaining ties to WKYC-TV and its prior NBC ownership throughout the 1970s. The transmitter for WWWE was moved back to their previous tower in Brecksville on September 5, 1974, that tower is still in use today by WWWE's successor WTAM, along with FM stations WAKS (co-owned with WTAM) and WZAK. In addition, the studios for both WWWE and WWWM were moved to Park Centre—known today as Reserve Square—that November 14. WWWE would then drop its NBC Radio affiliation altogether by 1977.

WWWE was sold to Combined Communications, Inc. in December 1976 for $7.5 million, consummated the following September; Ohio Communications retained WWWM. Combined Communications subsequently merged into Globe Broadcasting Corp., owner of WMGC (1260 AM) and WDOK; WMGC was spun off to comply with then-existing ownership rules. Gannett then merged into Combined Communications in June 1979 in a $370 million deal; at the time, it was one of the largest mergers and acquisitions in the broadcasting industry.

In December 1981, WWWE switched formats to country branded as Country 11, going in direct competition with WHK (1420 AM) and WKSW (99.5 FM). With the switch, the duo of Rick Marron and Ron McGuire were installed in morning drive, displacing Larry Morrow to afternoons; Morrow eventually left the station. Citing disappointing ratings and a waning audience in the market overall for country music, WWWE quietly switched back to an easy listening/MOR format in August 1983, again using the 3WE brand.

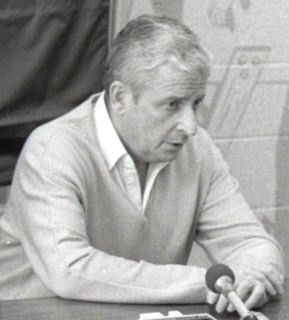
Art Modell, majority owner of the Cleveland Browns from 1961 to 1996, also controlled WWWE parent Lake Erie Broadcasting from 1985 to 1987.

==== "A Modell Miracle" ====
Gannett sold off both WWWE and WDOK to Lake Erie Broadcasting, controlled by then-Cleveland Browns majority owner Art Modell and minority owner Al Lerner, for $9.5 million in February 1985. The purchase was seen by some as a surprise: Lake Erie consistently lost money operating WJW since purchasing it from Storer Communications in 1977, and was under financial pressure to sell WJW when that station's format changed from MOR to talk radio in July 1982. WJW made a winning bid for the Browns radio broadcast rights that included the team taking an ownership stake in the station, but minority owner Robert Gries sued Modell on charges of anti-competitive practices and existing flagship WHK matched WJW's bid for the 1984 season. Lake Erie's purchase of WWWE and WDOK came days after Lake Erie—not WJW specifically—managed to secure a long-term contract for the Browns effective with the 1985 season. Despite Modell's history of questionable investments and concerns he was heavily in debt, he dismissed speculation that Lake Erie did not have the money to complete the deal, claiming "our collective net worth far exceeds the price of these stations".

Concurrent with the purchase and to meet regulatory approval, Lake Erie divested WJW to Booth American for $2.1 million. Not included in the sale was WJW's talk format, which Lake Erie opted to "move" outright to WWWE. Nearly all of WJW's air talent and management were reassigned to WWWE, with Pete Franklin's Sportsline as the lone program retained. While neither WJW or WWWE had strong ratings, WJW's talk format had been drawing more younger listeners than competitor WERE, while WWWE was now one of the lowest-rated stations outside of sports programming. Dismissed with the move were Ray Marshall, David "Fig" Newton, Jack Reynolds and morning sportscaster Bruce Drennan along with eight other staffers. Franklin repeatedly threatened to leave WWWE during the latter days of Gannett ownership, and Drennan was seen in some circles as a potential replacement to host Sportsline.

WJW general manager Art Caruso and news director John O'Day assumed like duties at WWWE, and were tasked with hiring Jim Muller's broadcast partner for the Browns broadcasts which were also transferred to WWWE. Along with the Indians and Cavs rights, Lake Erie's takeover of WWWE resulted in the station now holding the broadcast rights to all three professional sports teams for the first time. Newspaper reports recognized the transactions and format changes as "WWWE... became, in (essence), WJW", or that WJW had "a new location on the radio dial". The final week of programming over WJW had promos for both the talk format's "new home" on WWWE and Booth American's replacement format on WJW, rechristened as WRMR. Indeed, the switchover at 11:00 a.m. on June 11, 1985, had a "final sign-off" for WJW followed by Cleveland mayor George Voinovich pressing a ceremonial switch on WWWE that completed the "move" of WJW's prior talk format.

Along with Franklin, the "new" WWWE's lineup boasted an all-news block in morning drive, followed by hosts John McCullough, Michael Freedman, Merle Pollis and Joel Rose, with NBC Talknet in the overnight hours. The summer 1985 Arbitron book showed substantial ratings increases for WWWE after the switch to talk, surprising even the station's management and resulting in one paper calling their fifth-place showing "almost a Modell Miracle". Ratings for WWWE remained higher than with the MOR format, but slowly stagnated against WERE despite a substantial promotional campaign centered around Pollis, Rose and Franklin. Larry Elder, who was involved with local television productions in Cleveland, was inspired to enter talk radio after sitting in as a guest on Pollis' WWWE show. The station bid aggressively against WHK and WERE to retain the Cleveland Indians rights during the summer of 1986, while Franklin—who now additionally did weekend work for St. Louis's KMOX—again threatened to leave WWWE if it lost the Indians games. McCullough and Freedman were both fired as part of an October 1986 lineup shakeup, but Freedman returned less than two months later following Joel Rose's resignation after a contract dispute, while Pollis subsequently left to reunite with Rose over at WERE.

==== Losing Pete Franklin, sale to Independent Group ====
Most people didn't think he'd go (to New York) because there have been stories of Pete (Franklin) leaving before, and he always stayed. Pete has dominated the market for 21 years. He always held the trump card, and he usually played it to get a raise and stay here. But I think he got such a lucrative deal from New York, and the money, combined with the idea of climbing that one last big mountain, was too much for him to resist.

— Nev Chandler

As May 1987 began, Lake Erie entered into negotiations to sell WWWE to Jacor for $14 million; Jacor already owned WBBG and WMJI—the former WWWM—while concurrently putting WBBG up for sale. Had the deal closed, WWWE would have been added to a growing portfolio that included Cincinnati's WLW and Denver's KOA. The WWWE sale, however, was jeopardized after Franklin announced intentions to leave WWWE for a lucrative two-year contract with New York City's WHN to headline a new all-sports format to be named "WFAN". Days after the announcement, Franklin underwent emergency quadruple bypass surgery at the Cleveland Clinic following a massive heart attack, which some attributed to stress over the New York move while Franklin attributed it to a poor diet. Calls to Sportsline in the wake of Franklin's heart attack were filled with well-wishers, particularly from females; WHN's station manager John Chanin recognized Franklin as "a very sincere, warm person" unlike his radio persona, and that the possibility of leaving Cleveland affected him deeply. WWWE was forced to use a variety of guest hosts for Sportsline that included Nev Chandler and Gib Shanley, along with nationally known figures Bob Costas, Paul McGuire and Dick Vitale. Franklin ultimately chose to leave Cleveland for WFAN by that September.

Jacor withdrew their purchase offer of WWWE due to Franklin's departure, having considered him an "important asset". Lake Erie ended up selling both WDOK and WWWE to Independent Group, Inc. on August 3, 1987, for a combined $13.5 million, a $4 million net profit for Modell's syndicate. Independent Group marked a return to WWWE for both Tom Embrescia and Tom Wilson, while co-investor Larry Pollock had experience with Larry Robinson's broadcasting interests. Real estate magnate and Cleveland Force owner Bert Wolstein also was an investor, reportedly owning almost 50 percent of the station, but promised the Force would honor their existing radio contract with WGAR. Coincidentally, WWWE morning sportscaster Mike Snyder, who called the Force games over WGAR, was himself dismissed. Bruce Drennan returned to WWWE in November 1987 as guest host of Sportsline, asserting that "the show needs me"; Drennan was contacted directly by Tom Wilson and had worked previously for Embresica at WBBG. Meanwhile, Michael Freedman was fired from WWWE for the second time in one year, this time owing to a disagreement over paid vacations. Former WSLR executive Harvey Simms was hired by the outgoing management to be the station's marketing director, then was promoted to general manager by the new ownership less than three months later. David George, a station veteran of eight years, was also promoted from production director to program director.

==== Enter Gary Dee and Bruce Drennan ====
I'm amazed at his instinct for entertainment. I don't even know whether he actually knows how he does it, but knowing what's going to make people respond—for better, for worse, or whatever—is totally natural for him. A lot of people say, 'I hate what Gary did yesterday, I hate what he did today, and I'm gonna hate what he does tomorrow, too.'

— David George, WWWE program director, on Gary Dee

Despite Bruce Drennan's open lobbying for the Sportsline slot, he was generally seen as a long shot to take over the program. Terry Pluto of the Akron Beacon Journal regarded Drennan as having "a voice that sounds as if he gargled with Drano" and in ranking probable Sportsline hosts, said of Drennan, "if nothing else, he's available". WWWE general manager Harvey Simms promised a permanent host by the end of 1987, to which Pete Franklin commented, "When Jack Kennedy was shot, they had a guy lined up in a few minutes, but it has taken them seven months to replace (me)... what that tells me is the new owners don't have the money to pay anybody." WWWE also conducted a newspaper poll to help choose Franklin's successor; Dan Coughlin, who also was a Sportsline fill-in host, retrospectively called the polling process less honest than the "fan vote" for the 1988 MLB All-Star Game (where Oakland Athletics fans voted en masse for catcher Terry Steinbach) and the Rolling Stone "Radio Station of the Year" poll that WMMS infamously rigged. Drennan was chosen to host Sportsline on December 28, 1987, beating out WERE's Greg Brinda, setting off a war of words between the two—and between Franklin and Drennan—while Franklin committed to an interview on Brinda's competing show.

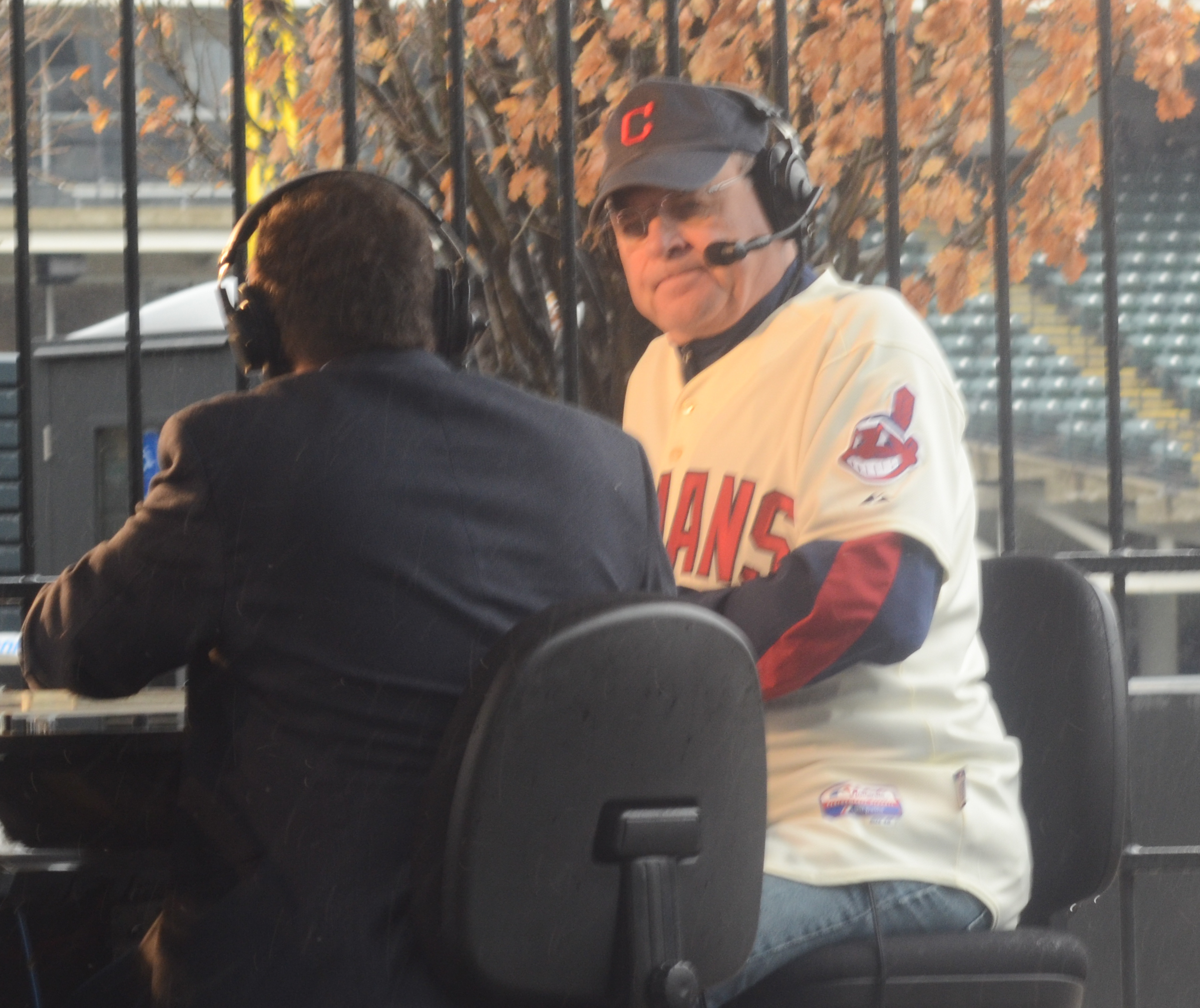
Bruce Drennan

Drennan's addition was one of many changes ushered in at WWWE that sought to reorient the audience towards the 25–54 demographic typically accustomed to rock music and the FM dial. While Simms merely suggested at first of "fine-tuning and polishing" the format, program director David George intended to make WWWE the top-rated station in Cleveland overall, "...and we were not going to do it with conventional news/talk". The station hired shock jock Gary Dee (Gilbert) for the midday slot on January 7, 1988, replacing John Dayle, who would rejoin Merle Pollis and Joel Rose at WERE. Dee's hiring came after management and all six Independent Group stakeholders agreed by consensus. Dee's conservative-leaning populist persona was often compared to onetime WERE host Morton Downey Jr., while the Beacon Journal's Bob Dyer said, "he makes Jerry Falwell sound like a flaming liberal". After the acquittal of a Lorain man on charges of molesting his daughter, Dee publicly attacked both the judge and county prosecutor, insinuating that their children should be raped while going into graphic detail on the case and giving out their phone numbers; the station later apologized. Dee's often-inflammatory remarks, coupled with several off-color statements by Drennan on Sportsline, soon prompted Dyer to ask, "is WWWE trying to corner the market on racism?" A fishing boat owned by Dee was intentionally burned while he was on vacation, prompting WWWE to offer a cash reward in exchange for information.

It was David "Fig" Newton, who returned to WWWE as afternoon host on April 11, 1988, that netted the most negative attention. 38 days after his show debuted, a WJW-TV report filed by Carl Monday revealed Newton was previously convicted on charges of purchasing a videotape that contained child pornography. After winding up on a mailing list after purchasing an art film containing nudity, government agents attempted to bait him with porn mail catalogs, and he purchased a tape after the eighth attempt. Monday confronted Newton about the allegations while Newton conducted his show in the WWWE studios, while the U.S. attorney that handled Newton's case revealed he was fired from his prior job in Denver over the conviction. Dee began his show the following morning pillorying Newton, declaring he would refuse to work at a station that employed "a child molester", and Newton resigned later that day. Danny Wright and humorist Tom Bush took Newton's time slot in what was termed "rock radio without the music". Even with all the controversy, WWWE ascended to fourth place in the spring 1988 Arbitron book, helped largely by Dee and the Indians. However, the station's Indians commitments caused the majority of the Cavaliers' 1988 playoff run to air on WRMR and WDOK instead. In response, Joe Tait—who had taken over as head of Cavaliers broadcasting operations—ended the contract with WWWE and moved the flagship to WRMR.

==== Indecency fallout ====
Danny Wright was fired from WWWE at the end of 1988, with Wright expressing disappointment over the station's lack of promotional support and being "stuck in the middle" between Dee and Drennan. Tom Bush was subsequently paired with Bob Becker until a further lineup revamp on April 10, 1989, had Becker moved to mornings, incumbent morning host Bob Fuller moved to middays, and Dee moved to afternoons. Veteran executive Nick Anthony joined WWWE as program director, replacing programming consultant Eric Stevens; Anthony was hired after Harvey Simms learned about his availability through reading a Beacon Journal story about his departure from WKDD days earlier. Anthony promptly cut down the volume of commercials WWWE was obligated to run via radio network commitments to 14 minutes per hour; at one point, the station aired as much as 20 to 22 minutes of commercials per hour. Rumors emerged of Anthony replacing Drennan with XETRA-AM announcer Lee Hamilton, as both previously worked together in Akron, while Greg Brinda's WERE show started to outdraw Drennan in the ratings. NBC Talknet was dropped in favor of ABC Radio's Tom Snyder and Sally Jessy Raphael, with Snyder marking the WWWE addition by interviewing the station's overnight board operator, coincidentally named Tom Snyder. Anthony only lasted for five months before resigning in mid-June 1989, one week after weekender Geoff Sindelar took over as Sportsline host; Sindelar had gained notoriety as a regular caller to Pete Franklin. Drennan subsequently assumed Sindelar's prior weekend duties.

I just didn't follow directions. I'm my own worst enemy. Gary Dee drives Gary Gilbert crazy.

— Gary Dee (Gilbert), explaining his August 1989 firing from WWWE

The controversy surrounding Gary Dee reached a breaking point on August 25, 1989, when WWWE confirmed Dee had been suspended indefinitely 9 days earlier after a formal indecency complaint against him was filed with the FCC, the second complaint against him in one year. Three months of Dee airchecks were included in the complaint, some of which contained profanity broadcast over the air, which Dee attributed to faulty equipment. As the FCC was launching an anti-indecency campaign focused on both radio and television, WWWE executives were worried that the station's license, which was up for renewal, could be revoked. Dee was fired on August 31, 1989, with the station merely explaining the move as "a decision... to pursue a different direction" and denied it had anything to do with the complaint, while Dee claimed, "they had every reason to fire me because I didn't follow directions". Dee's ratings overall had been a disappointment for WWWE management, as he was previously a perennially top-rated host at WERE and WHK. The FCC's anti-indecency campaign specifically cited Dee's June 15, 1989, show for multiple discussions on-air regarding sexual fantasies and behavior; WWWE was one of eight stations given a 30-day notice by the agency to address the allegations.

The station filled the vacancy left by Dee with Bob Becker paired with friend and radio novice Luther Heggs, while Bob Fuller returned to mornings, and Beth Albright was brought in from Birmingham, Alabama, to host Fuller's former midday slot. Pete Franklin also "returned" to WWWE with daily sports commentaries during the morning and afternoon shows. The biggest change, however, occurred on December 23, 1989, when Booth American purchased WWWE from Independent Group in exchange for $10 million in cash and WRMR, effectively making the deal an asset swap and the station's fifth overall ownership change since 1972. The cash considerations were a motivating factor for Independent to sell off WWWE while the company's principals were happy to retain an AM property. Without Dee, WWWE fell to ninth place in the Arbitron book, while WRMR ranked at tenth place. Booth retained the Cavaliers radio network flagship rights, transferring it back to WWWE, while also purchasing the production rights to the Browns and Indians networks from Sports Marketing, controlled by Tom Wilson. The transaction was delayed for several months due to the FCC investigation against Dee with WWWE later paying an $8,000 fine. The outgoing Independent Group management retained the ability to hire Tom Hamilton as Herb Score's Indians broadcast partner prior to the start of the 1990 season with Booth's blessing.

==== The "Monster on the Lake" ====
WWWE logo from 1990 to 1996.

Booth's takeover of WWWE was regarded in the local press as a "purge" with much of the airstaff going on-air to discuss their fates. Dismissed were Bob Fuller, Beth Albright, Bob Becker, Luther Heggs, Steve Church and Bruce Drennan, with Geoff Sindelar retained as Sportsline host on an interim basis. Lee Hamilton again expressed interest in joining WWWE, having been friends with much of the new Booth management, but could not agree to a contract after expressing a desire to also do play-by-play announcing. When the deal closed on June 25, 1990, WWWE filled the majority of their daytime lineup with syndicated fare: Dr. Joy Browne in late mornings and The Rush Limbaugh Show and Dr. Dean Edell in afternoons, Rush's program having moved over from WERE. Browne's show was added after Fuller declined an offer to host middays and was only temporary as syndicator ABC Radio planned on cancelling it by that September. Lee Kirk from Toledo's WSPD was ultimately brought in for the timeslot.

The station went aggressive on news with rolling all-news blocks launched in morning and afternoon drive along with an hourlong noon block. A 12-person 24-hour news department was instituted with ABC-Information newscasts replacing CBS; Booth executive Roger Turner cited ABC's "tighter writing and a faster delivery" as the reason for the switch. Turner himself became a on-air presence with daily editorials also implemented by Booth. By virtue of common ownership with WLTF, WWWE also became involved with WLTF's Coats for Kids charity campaign, which was launched by Booth American in 1981. New studios were constructed for WWWE and WLTF at the Western Reserve Building in the Warehouse District with an additional studio at the Nautica Entertainment Complex for sports talk shows. Newsman Ed Coury, who rejoined WWWE upon the Booth takeover as co-host of the morning news block, was eventually promoted to news director at the end of 1991. The afternoon news block co-anchored by Bob Henderson soon evolved into a talk show in its own right, with Henderson eschewing confrontational arguments in favor of a polite demeanor.

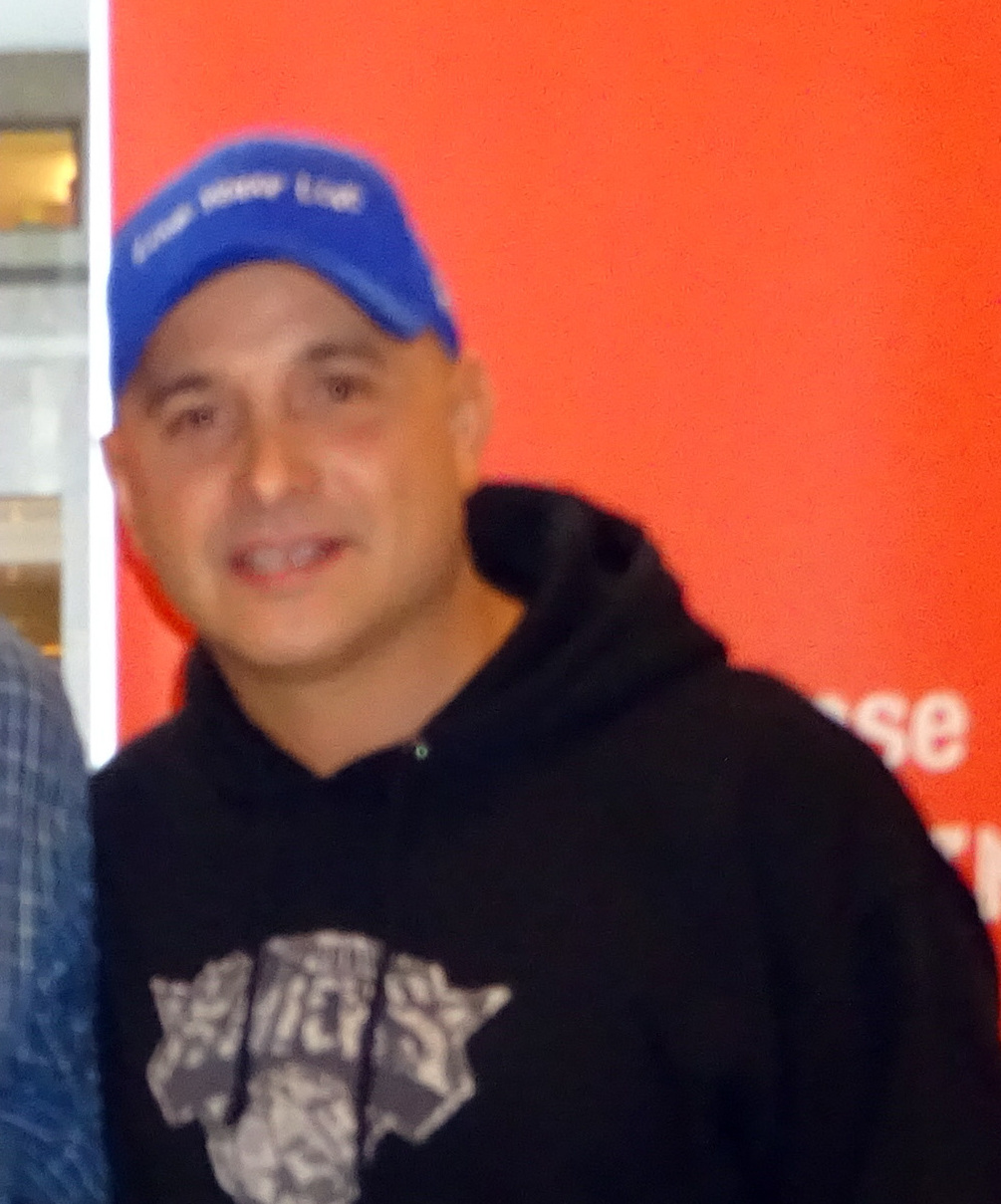
Craig Carton

Sindelar departed the station on October 3, 1990, after a series of changes by management limiting the number of phone calls to his show when listener surveys revealed multiple complaints that the same people were always calling in constantly. Sportscaster Mike Snyder, who joined the station the previous month, took over as Sportsline host, while Sindelar resurfaced at WKNR. Despite simulcasting all games throughout the 1990 season with WLTF, WWWE lost the Cleveland Browns rights after the season ended, with WHK prevailing in a bidding war against WKNR. Following the 1991 season, WWWE ended its radio contract with the Cleveland Indians, with the flagship rights going to WKNR. WWWE hired Craig Carton as Sportsline host in April 1992, replacing Snyder, who was promoted to sports director, a position he holds to this day; Carton left the station in May 1993. WWWE picked up Imus in the Morning for morning drive in September 1993 after Westwood One offered up the show for national syndication.

In April 1994, Booth American merged with Broadcast Alchemy to form Secret Communications in a $160 million deal. Gary Bruce was hired from WIOD in Miami as program director that May, and re-oriented WWWE back to a "shock radio" style of talk the station offered in the late 1980s, acknowledging that WWWE was the poorest-performing station in Secret's 14-station chain. General manager Dennis Best cited the low ratings of Lee Kirk and Bob Henderson, coupled with ratings successes for "deejays who talk and act like the common man" as the impetus for WWWE's changes. Bruce hired two hosts from WIOD: Chuck Meyer for mornings, replacing Imus in the Morning, and Jaz McKay for late mornings, replacing Kirk. The duo of Jeff Kinzbach and Ed "Flash" Ferenc were installed in afternoon drive hosting a show not dissimilar to their former morning show on WMMS. Mike Trivisonno took over as Sportsline host on July 11, 1994, with former host Mike Snyder becoming the program's update anchor. Like Sindelar, Trivisonno was a regular caller to Pete Franklin's iteration of the show and was derisively dubbed "Mr. Know It All" by Franklin.

McKay's show was a notable ratings failure, and was moved to overnights in late March 1995, with Rich Michaels taking over the late-morning timeslot. Aside from Limbaugh, WWWE struggled in the ratings and was even outranked substantially by WRMR, prompting the dismissals of Bruce and McKay. The Bob & Tom Show was added in evenings via tape-delay in October 1995 amid speculation that the station could go all-news outside of Limbaugh and Trivisonno. WWWE itself would make news on January 23, 1996, when its traffic plane hit a cellular phone tower and crashed in Highland Hills, killing both MetroTraffic reporter James Endsley (who was known on-air as Fred Wesley) and pilot James McVeigh.

=== WTAM (1996–present) ===
==== New name and an emerging "Triv" ====
All I'll say right now is that we're re-evaluating how we identify ourselves. But let's put it this way - we can't change being on the AM band or our frequency, can we?

— Bobby Hatfield, WTAM program director

WWWE phased out the "3WE" branding entirely in June 1996 and started to simply identify as "AM 1100", with the only mention of the call letters during the top-of-hour station identification. Program director Bobby Hatfield (Joe Reilly) confirmed to The Plain Dealer on July 1, 1996, that a call sign change was imminent, management perceived the WWWE letters and "3WE" name as "stodgy and antiquated" that inhibited efforts to recast the station's identity as newer and aggressive. The WTAM calls were reclaimed after looking over available call signs with an "AM" in them and having rejected "WZAM" and "WUAM" because of similarities to WZAK and WUAB. That WTAM had been the station's original identifier did hold some historical significance but merely served as incidental; Hatfield said of the process to rename the station, "we can't change being on the AM band or our frequency, can we?" (Note: The WWWE calls were later assigned to a 5,000-watt daytime station in the Atlanta market, also at 1100 AM.)

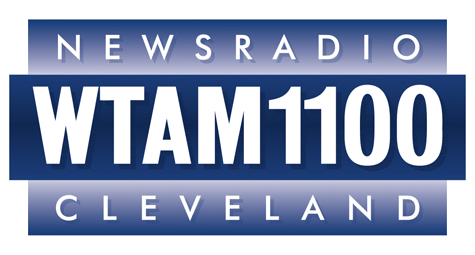
WTAM logo from 1996 to 2018, introduced after the callsign change.

With the call sign change to WTAM on July 29, 1996, the lineup was revamped again. Jeff Kinzbach and Ed Ferenc were moved to morning drive but with Kinzbach as the main host and Ferenc providing special features and commentaries; Hatfield said of the rearrangement, "we're going to make Ed the Paul Harvey of Cleveland". An hour-long news block at noon was reinstated, Mike Trivisonno's Sportsline was moved to afternoon drive, and Dr. Laura Schlessinger—which WWWE picked up for weekends in late May along with the nightly Coast to Coast AM—was added in early evenings. The station also signed up as a charter affiliate of the Baltimore Ravens radio network for the 1996 season for any Browns fans wanting to follow the team out of curiosity, and filled all local advertising breaks with public service announcements. WTAM's ratings experienced a resurgence in the Fall 1996 Arbitron book, moving to ninth place overall, sixth place in afternoon drive, and third place in afternoons among the 25–54 male demographic.

I think Mike (Trivisonno) is a very nice man, for a very socially retarded ignoramus. The fact that he has a platform on a 50,000-watt radio station makes me want to vomit. He says what people want to say but can't... The danger is that he doesn't offer any analysis with that; he can't be bothered with the facts. Mike just hasn't grown up.

— Merle Pollis

While still formally called Sportsline, the show soon evolved into an "anything goes" format after Mike Trivisonno's move to afternoons with executive producer Marty Allen, call screener Jerry Jaye, producer Paul Rado, and update anchor Mike Snyder among the on-air cast. A mail-in listener poll conducted by Plain Dealer radio critic Roger Brown in the summer of 1996 named Trivisonno the "Voice of Cleveland", beating WRMR's Bill Randle. Brown's criticism of Trivisonno, at one point comparing him to "the obnoxious race-baiting of your average bigot rally leader... (but) has his own teeth", attracted negative attention when a fan-made inflammatory billboard was erected in Cleveland's West Side with numerous racial epithets against Brown. An Italian-American, Trivisonno freely used the pejorative "dago" in self-deprecating nature, parodying the "megadittos" catchphrase used by callers to Rush Limbaugh's show with "megadagos" among his callers, explaining, "words like that don't bother me... they are only words... if everyone thought that way, those words would go away". Indeed, Trivisonno often referred to himself as a "dumb dago from the East Side of Cleveland with a 10th grade education" but took it as a compliment whenever people likened him to Pete Franklin, Howard Stern and Gary Dee, all three he held in high regard.

==== Reclaiming the Indians ====
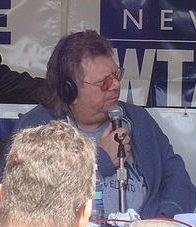
Mike Trivisonno

Secret divested their entire nine-station group to SFX Broadcasting on October 8, 1996, in a $300 million deal. Conventional wisdom had SFX promptly reselling WTAM and WLTF to a third party, given their track record of buying and selling stations quickly. Secret withdrew the Cleveland stations—valued at $45 million—from the deal in mid-January 1997; executive Frank Wood stated the company never wanted to sell them and considered purchasing additional stations in the market. However, Jacor bought WTAM and WLTF on April 25, 1997, for $23.9 million in cash and $21 million in company stock, ten years after having called off their prior purchase of WWWE. General manager Dennis Best said after the deal was struck, "short of Secret keeping us, Jacor buying us is the best thing that could have happened". Jacor's purchase occurred six weeks after Secret was rumored to purchase WKNR, which was running an annual deficit of $1 million due to their recently renewed Indians contract being a loss leader. Talks soon began between Jacor and WKNR owner Cablevision, which sold that station for $8.7 million on August 19, 1997. Speculation soon centered on Jacor programming WTAM far more aggressively to attract additional male listeners, and that WTAM's prior moves gave them a head start.

Rich Michaels was fired on June 16, 1997, with Dr. Laura taking his late-morning spot on the lineup under the belief her program would draw higher ratings. One month later, WTAM recruited Morton Downey Jr. to host a local evening show, but Downey abruptly resigned after six weeks. Former WERE host Rick Gilmour took his place, but was not named a permanent host as Jacor disclosed plans to move the Indians rights to WTAM once their purchase of WKNR was complete. Kinzbach and Ferenc were dismissed on October 5, 1997, with an all-news block taking their place in mornings. When Jacor assumed operations of WKNR on January 4, 1998, Trivisonno hosted a day-long marathon on that station, the last four hours simulcast on WTAM. The Indians flagship formally was transferred to WTAM with the 1998 home opener on April 10, 1998. Pete Franklin also returned to host Sportsline once a week via a home studio at his San Diego residence, but quit several weeks later in protest over Trivisonno's aforementioned on-air use of ethnic pejoratives, which reportedly hurt Trivisonno. On August 10, 1998, Jacor traded WKNR to Capstar Broadcasting in exchange for Pittsburgh's WTAE to clear regulatory approval for their $620 million purchase of Nationwide Communications. Clear Channel then purchased Jacor in a $6.5 billion deal announced on October 8, 1998; by then, Jacor had already acquired Premiere Networks—the syndicators for Rush Limbaugh, Dr. Dean Edell, Dr. Laura and Coast to Coast AM—all of which WTAM now aired via vertical integration.

Veteran radio executive Kevin Metheny was named WTAM's operations director in June 1998, eventually overseeing the entire Jacor-Clear Channel Cleveland cluster. Bill Wills was transferred from co-owned WLW in July 1998 to host the all-news morning drive block, and was paired with newscaster John Webster and sports anchor Casey Coleman for Wills, Webster and Coleman in the Morning. Bruce Drennan, who had made another return to the station in 1995 for weekend/fill-in work, was once again named Sportsline host. WTAM enjoyed substantial ratings success thanks to the Indians' 1998 playoff run and the impeachment trial of President Clinton, reaching fifth place overall and Trivisonno at first place overall in the Fall 1998 Arbitron book. Jacor won a bidding war for the expansion Cleveland Browns' broadcast rights, with WMJI as the flagship and WTAM simulcasting games; Coleman was also named as sideline reporter for the Browns broadcasts. Drennan left the station again on July 26, 2000, after failing to agree on a new contract; by then, WTAM had become the top-ranked overall station in the Spring 2000 Arbitron book.

==== Consolidation and changes ====
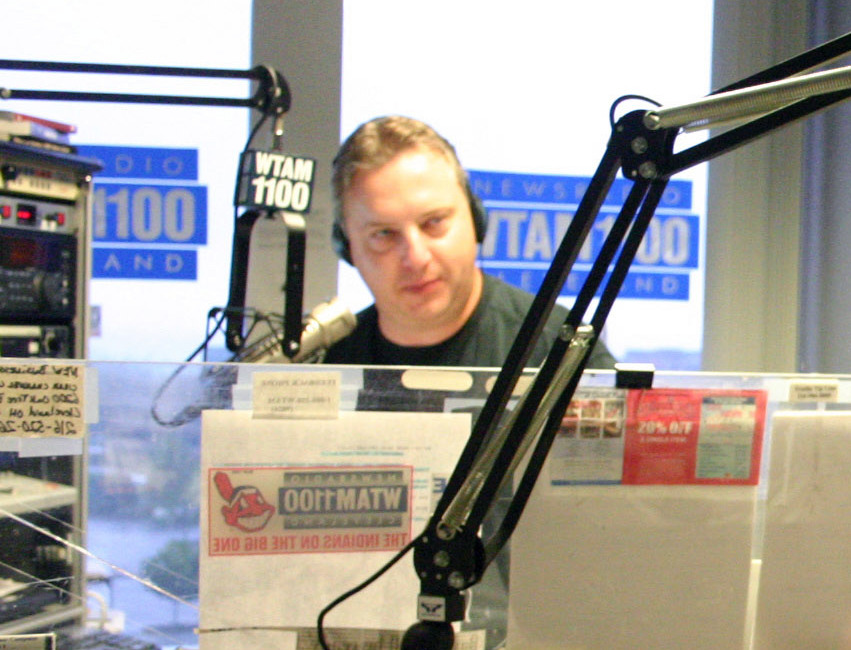
Bill Wills

Dr. Laura was replaced on the weekday schedule with Glenn Beck following the September 11 attacks; Kevin Metheny said of Glenn after the switch, "he has a greater inclination to entertain and relate, rather than evangelize", and felt Dr. Laura's ratings were "disappointing". John Webster's presence on Wills, Webster and Coleman ended on November 2, 2001, after a downsizing effort that also saw seven other staffers in the cluster fired. WTAM's studios, along with the studios for all other Clear Channel Cleveland stations, were consolidated into a new facility in Independence in 2002, with one newspaper story calling the arrangement "a food court of radio, with McDonald's, Burger King and Taco Bell". Beck was replaced in March 2005 with Jerry Springer's mid-morning show, which WTAM dropped the following March in favor of a local program hosted by Bob Frantz, formerly with WSPD in Toledo. Beck's show was then brought back on November 3, 2008, bumping Frantz to evenings. Casey Coleman died at the age of 55 on November 27, 2006, following a 15-month bout with pancreatic cancer; Mike Snyder succeeded Casey on the morning show, renamed Wills and Snyder. The station was one of 10 stations awarded the 2007 Crystal Radio Award for public service awarded by the National Association of Broadcasters at the Radio Luncheon on April 17, 2007.

WTAM added a mid-morning debate program titled The Spew on March 11, 2013, with Trivisonno and Bob Frantz as debate partners and Dave Ramos as moderator. Frantz was fired from WTAM on July 8, 2014, due to "corporate restructuring" but alluded heavily to financial issues surrounding Clear Channel which itself was renamed iHeartMedia one month later. Nick Camino replaced Frantz in evenings, while John Lanigan replaced Frantz as Trivisonno's debate partner on The Spew, with Mike Snyder now as moderator. Lanigan, who had retired from WMJI earlier in the year, was reluctant to take the job and had barely if ever interacted with Trivisonno, but the two became friendly when Trivisonno offered to interview Lanigan for one program and Lanigan returned the favor the next day. While Lanigan initially viewed the show as a way to "get up in the morning and read the newspapers... (keeping) me alert, alive and involved", he abruptly quit during the middle of the August 8, 2018, episode, citing a lack of enjoyment, disinterest in the topics discussed and feeling unqualified to express his opinion. Following a brief period with Jensen Lewis as a fill-in co-host, The Spew was retired on September 24, 2018, for an hour-long local program hosted by Geraldo Rivera, with Lewis and Trivisonno joining Camino in early evenings for Sports Feed 2.0. Camino left the station in 2019 to join WKYC as a sports reporter and weekend sports anchor.

==== Losing Rush and Triv ====
If there's a Mount Rushmore of Cleveland radio, Mike Trivisonno is right there on the forefront... Mike Trivisonno is on that.

— Mike Snyder

Rush Limbaugh remained on the lineup until his February 2021 death; following four months of "best of" tribute shows, WTAM—by virtue of iHeartMedia ownership—became a charter affiliate of The Clay Travis and Buck Sexton Show on June 18, 2021. An even larger shock to the station, however, happened when Mike Trivisonno died suddenly on October 28, 2021, hours before his afternoon drive show was to have started. Co-hosts Carmen Angelo and Seth Williams, along with WTAM program director Ray Davis, hosted a memorial program that day in Trivisonno's time slot, the start of which was delayed by an hour with various taped press conferences airing as filler. Industry blogger Lance Venta commented that Trivisonno's show on the night Art Modell revealed plans to relocate the Cleveland Browns to Baltimore "may have been one of the best one-night ... talk radio shows in history".

After a period of rotating guest hosts that included Angelo and Williams, WTAM appointed David "Bloomdaddy" Blomquist, morning host at sister station WWVA in Wheeling, West Virginia, as Trivisonno's replacement with Angelo retained as a co-host. Blomquist's WWVA show, which he had hosted since 2005, was regionally syndicated to other talk stations in the region including Akron's WHLO. Geraldo Rivera left at the end of March 2022 owing to an increased role with Fox News; his replacement in the mid-morning time slot was comedian Jimmy Malone, John Lanigan's former co-host at WMJI, a post he held until August 2024.

== Programming ==
=== Regular schedule ===
Local personalities on WTAM include Bill Wills and Mike Snyder in morning drive, David "Bloomdaddy" Blomquist in afternoon drive and Dennis Manoloff evenings. The station also carries The Glenn Beck Program (late mornings), The Clay Travis and Buck Sexton Show (midday) and Coast to Coast AM (overnight). Gary Sullivan is heard weekend mornings while Ben Ferguson and Bill Cunningham are heard Sundays, along with Fox Sports Radio in lieu of any sports play-by-play. WTAM airs national news updates from ABC News Radio and Fox News Radio, and local news and weather updates from WKYC.

=== Play-by-play ===
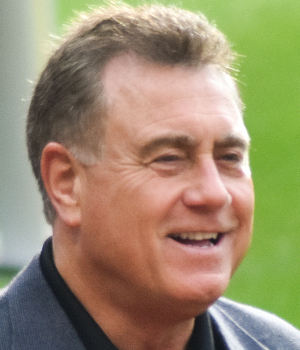
Tom Hamilton

WTAM is the AM flagship of a 28-station network for the Cleveland Cavaliers (NBA) with play-by-play announcer Tim Alcorn, color analyst Jim Chones, Mike Snyder as pregame/postgame studio host, and Brad Sellers as postgame analyst.

WTAM is also the AM flagship for a 29-station network for the Cleveland Guardians (MLB) with Tom Hamilton and Jim Rosenhaus as announcers. The flagship statuses for both networks are shared with WMMS, since 2013 for the Guardians (Note: The franchise was renamed from the Cleveland Indians at the start of the 2022 season.) and 2014 for the Cavaliers; all games for both teams are broadcast live and limited solely to terrestrial broadcasts.

WTAM additionally airs Cleveland State Vikings men's basketball games in the event of conflicts with sister station/CSU flagship WARF, and simulcasts select Cleveland Monsters games with sister station/Monsters flagship "Sports Radio 99.1" (WMMS-HD2 100.7/W256BT FM 99.1).

== FM translator ==
As of September 6, 2018, WTAM simulcasts over low-power Cleveland FM translator W295DE (106.9 FM).

Broadcast translator for WTAM
Call sign	Frequency	City of license	FID	ERP (W)	HAAT	Class	Transmitter coordinates	FCC info
W295DE	106.9 FM	Cleveland	147802	146	−264 m (−866 ft)	D	41°22′45″N 81°43′11.1″W	LMS

Signal contours for WTAM and associated translator.; Daytime groundwave 2 mV/m signal for WTAM; Grade A 60 dBu signal for W295DE
