= Jimmy Malone =

American radio personality and comedian

- Born: James Malone; 1954 (age 70–71); Cleveland, Ohio
- Occupation(s): Radio host Stand-up comedian
- Awards: Marconi Award winner Ohio Broadcasters HOF
- Website: Jimmy Malone.com

James Malone (born 1954 in Cleveland, Ohio) is a radio personality and stand-up comedian based in Cleveland, Ohio, who co-hosts the morning drive time show on WNIR 100.1 FM in Kent, Ohio. He previously hosted a weekday show heard on iHeart's WTAM 1100 AM/106.9 FM in Cleveland until August 13, 2024 when he was fired as part of a cost-cutting plan by iHeartmedia.

He is best known the longtime co-host of the morning show on WMJI alongside John Lanigan, with whom he won a 2005 Marconi Award for Large Market Personality.

== Early life ==
Malone was born in 1954 as the youngest of three children to his parents Johnathan and Shirley, growing up on the east side of Cleveland in the Glenville neighborhood.

He attended Chesterfield Elementary School (where by his own admission he was a class comedian), and when he became a teenager (after his family had moved to suburban Shaker Heights), he attended Shaker Heights High School, where he graduated in 1972.

Malone then went to college, originally attending Cleveland State University, transferring after a semester to Morehouse College in Atlanta, before settling in at Ohio University, from which he eventually graduated in the mid '70s.

== Stand-up Comedy ==
After college, Malone had bounced around between jobs as an insurance salesman and a real estate agent (following in his father's footsteps), while performing as a stand-up comedian on the side. The main part of Malone's act was called "Knuckleheads in the News", where Malone would read headlines from the newspaper and comment about some of the more outlandish stories. In 1985, WMJI FM 105.7 morning DJ John Lanigan happened to be in attendance during one of Malone's shows at the (now defunct) Cleveland Comedy Club, and asked him to bring his "Knuckleheads" routine to his radio show.

== Radio career ==
Malone began his radio career in 1985, at first doing his "Knuckleheads" routine in weekly appearances on WMJI's popular Lanigan and Webster show. In 1991, Malone became a full-time co-host on the program, which then became known as Lanigan, Webster, and Malone, and then eventually just Lanigan and Malone after John Webster left the show in 1996. Malone won a Marconi Award for Large Market Personality of the Year in 2005 (shared with Lanigan)

Lanigan would retire in 2014, but Malone would continue as morning show co-host until 2021, when he began hosting his own weekly show heard Fridays on WMJI sister station WARF AM 1350, and replayed Saturday mornings on WMJI. In April 2022, the show moved to sister station WTAM 1100 AM/106.9 FM, airing weekdays from 9-10 a.m. In August 2024, he was let go from WTAM 1100 AM/106.9 FM.

Malone joined WNIR in January 2025 as a rotating co-host of their morning drive time program The Morning Buzz, where he hosted a featured segment every Monday morning called "Malone Mondays". He left WNIR in October 2025.

== Personal ==
Since 1996, Malone, his wife April, and his daughter Angela stage the annual "Malone Scholarship Golf Classic", a golf tournament which raises money to give college scholarships to high school students who may not be able to attend college without financial aid.

Malone also continues performing on the local stand-up comedy circuit.

== Awards and honors ==
- 2003 Ohio Broadcasters Hall of Fame inductee
- 2005 NAB Marconi Award for Large Market Personality of the Year (shared with John Lanigan)
- Shaker Heights High School Hall of Fame inductee
- 2010 Cleveland Association of Broadcasters Hall of Fame inductee
