= John Lanigan (broadcaster) =

Former American radio host

- Born: John Lanigan; 1943 (age 82–83); Ogallala, Nebraska
- Occupations: Radio personality (retired); TV personality (retired)
- Awards: National Radio HOF; Ohio Broadcasters HOF; Cleveland Broadcasters HOF; Marconi Award winner

John Lanigan (born 1943 in Ogallala, Nebraska) is a radio and TV broadcaster primarily known for his work in Cleveland, Ohio, and as the longtime morning host at WMJI in Cleveland from 1985 to 2014 as well.

== Biography ==
=== Early career ===
Lanigan was born in Ogallala, Nebraska, in 1943. While in high school, he was a DJ at his high school's radio station. Throughout the 1960s, Lanigan bounced between jobs in Denver's KHOW and Colorado Springs, Colorado, at one point working in both cities simultaneously: Colorado Springs during the day, and Denver at night. While at KHOW, Lanigan also served as the station's program director. Additionally, Lanigan worked in Albuquerque, New Mexico, and at KRLD in Dallas, the latter in afternoon drive.

=== WGAR (1971–84) ===
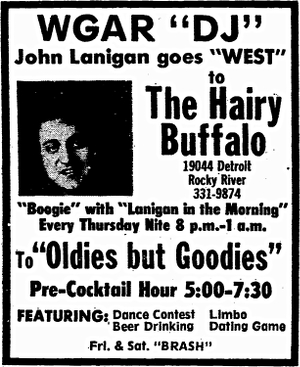
1974 print ad

Lanigan's Cleveland debut occurred at WGAR (1220 AM) in December 1971, taking over as that station's morning-drive host after the departure of Don Imus for WNBC (660 AM) in New York City. He was hired by WGAR general manager Jack G. Thayer after attracting his attention at a New Orleans industry convention, and bypassed 65 other applicants for the on-air position. Imus's quickly-earned notoriety in the Cleveland market caused some newspaper critics to view Lanigan as "desperately trying to emulate" Imus in addition to trepidation on Lanigan's part. Lanigan in the Morning, however, was an immediate ratings success. By the end of 1972, Lanigan was battling WIXY's Mike Reineri, WJW's Ed Fisher and WERE shock jock Gary Dee for the top-rated spot in morning drive a ranking Imus also attained in his first year at WGAR. While Lanigan's persona was nearly as controversial as Imus, he specialized more in satire and ribaldry he referred to as "adult humor" and the station described as "radio for consenting adults".

One long-running comedy bit, The Flex Club, was a double entendre set to David Rose's "The Stripper" that initially was through listener mail, but eventually featured callers describing times that they "flexed". A daily crossover that would end Lanigan's show and start Joe Mayer's midday show soon took a life of its own and became an extended daily segment, as both hosts kept trading jokes and laughter. Lanigan took over as host of WUAB's Prize Movie in 1975, further adding to his exposure in the market and beyond, as WUAB was carried to other cable systems throughout the region. Unique for its time, Lanigan regularly featured politicians on his show, beginning with Cleveland mayor Ralph Perk and continuing throughout the rest of his career. When Dennis Kucinich invited Lanigan to be at his swearing-in ceremony as Perk's mayoral successor on November 14, 1977, he dressed up as a court jester, poking fun at Kucinich's relatively young age and saying to the audience, "people have laughed at us long enough, it's time we laughed back." Lanigan later viewed himself as a "Renaissance Howard Beale" in response to comedians having repeatedly put down the city.

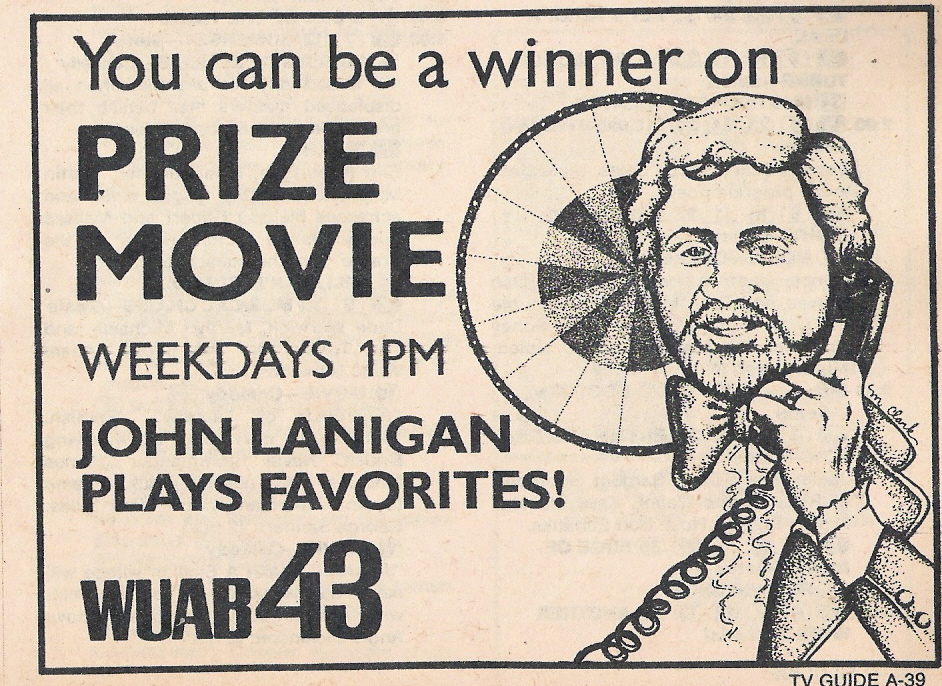
1975 ad promoting WUAB's Prize Movie featuring Lanigan as host.

Lanigan participated in numerous publicity stunts while at WGAR. One stunt promoting the Cleveland National Air Show had Lanigan parasailing to open the event, but the person driving the boat lost control, resulting in him crashing into the water and nearly missing a breakwall. Another stunt had Lanigan riding in a hot-air balloon—with assistance from advertiser/automobile dealer Rick Case—that intended to fly across Lake Erie and into Ontario, but winds from the lake ultimately took him eastward to Pennsylvania. A similar stunt attempt with Lanigan and Case riding in matching balloons from Akron to Cleveland was called off after high winds prevented the balloons from lifting up. Not all publicity was solicited: when Lanigan was ticketed by police one morning in August 1978 for driving 91 mph (146 km/h) on Interstate 77, one of the two officers admitted to being a fan of his show. A Jaycee branch in Ravenna invited Lanigan as a guest host for an annual dinner, but his jokes offended their Distinguished Service Award winner, a Catholic priest who abruptly left; Lanigan later remarked, "they knew exactly what they were getting". Lanigan additionally opened up a nightclub in Mayfield Heights named Lanigan's in the fall of 1982, it closed the following May. By September 1983, Lanigan was promoted to program director for WGAR due to multiple staffing changes.

John Lanigan left WGAR on February 9, 1984, to join WMGG in Clearwater-Tampa, following at 12-year run in mornings. Incumbent afternoon host and impressionist Paul Tapie was Lanigan's on-air successor, co-hosting with Lanigan in the days leading up to his departure.

=== WMJI (1985–2014) ===
Lanigan returned to Cleveland in 1985, becoming host of The Lanigan and Webster Show on WMJI FM 105.7 with veteran Cleveland radio voice John Webster. Lanigan's popularity in Cleveland helped raise the profile of WMJI, leading to the station winning five National Association of Broadcasters Marconi Awards during his tenure (Large Market Station of the Year in 1998 and 2003, and Oldies Station of the Year in 2002, 2004, and 2006).

Lanigan also is well known in Cleveland for his television work, as in conjunction with his radio shows, he was host of the daily afternoon Prize Movie on WUAB channel 43 during the '70s through the early '90s (with a hiatus when he was in Tampa, during which time the movie program was hosted by WWWE Radio morning man Dave "Fig" Newton).

During his show on July 20, 2012, as the news was breaking about the Aurora theater shooting, Lanigan reported that it was his son Jad, a Lieutenant in the Aurora, Colorado police department, who arrested the shooter James Holmes.

In November 2013, Lanigan was inducted into the National Radio Hall of Fame at a ceremony in Chicago.

Lanigan was honored on March 29, 2014, during the 2014 "Majic" Moondog Coronation Ball concert at Quicken Loans Arena. During the event, Lanigan was awarded with an official proclamation from the city of Cleveland, honoring his radio career and efforts in promoting the city. Lanigan's last show was on March 31, 2014, when he officially retired. In retirement, Lanigan stated that he plans to split his time between his homes in Colorado and Florida.

=== Post-retirement ===
In late 2014, Lanigan made somewhat of a comeback to Cleveland radio, becoming a co-host alongside Mike Trivisonno on The Spew, a daily hour-long debate program on WMJI sister station WTAM AM 1100. On August 8, 2018, Lanigan abruptly announced on air during a Spew broadcast that he was retiring from the show and radio entirely effective immediately, citing a lack of interest in the show's usual topics (politics, current events, Cleveland sports), not feeling qualified to give his opinions on such topics, and an overall lack of enjoyment doing the show.

== Awards and honors ==
- 1994 inductee – Ohio Broadcasters Hall of Fame
- 1998 inductee – Cleveland Association of Broadcasters Hall of Fame
- 2005 recipient – National Association of Broadcasters Marconi Award for Large Market Radio Personality of the Year (shared with co-host Jimmy Malone)
- 2012 recipient – Starlight Guardian Humanitarian Award
- 2013 inductee – National Radio Hall of Fame
- 2014 recipient – City of Cleveland Official Proclamation

== Bibliography ==
- Lanigan, John; Jedick, Peter; Olszewski, Mike (2017). Lanigan in the Morning: My Life in Radio. Cleveland, Ohio: Gray & Company. ISBN 978-1-938441-93-6.
- Olszewski, Mike; Berg, Richard; Wolff, Carlo (2011). WIXY 1260: Pixies, Six-Packs, and Supermen (PDF). Kent, Ohio: Black Squirrel Books. ISBN 978-1-60635-099-7. Archived (PDF) from the original on September 26, 2021.
- Olszewski, Mike (2003). Radio Daze: Stories from the Front in Cleveland's FM Air Wars. Kent, Ohio: Kent State University Press. ISBN 9780873387736. Archived from the original on December 9, 2016 – via Google Books.
