= Carl Monday =

American journalist

Carl Monday is an investigative TV reporter for WJW-TV in Cleveland, Ohio. "Carl Monday" was initially an on-air pseudonym, but became his legal name in 1972.

In May 2006, his report on the viewing of online pornography, among other lewd and lascivious behavior in Cleveland-area public libraries, managed to draw widespread attention on the Internet. Numerous sites posted a link to the video clip for its perceived comedic value. In the report, Monday confronted Berea resident Michael Cooper, who was caught on camera masturbating while viewing pornographic images in the library. Monday elicits denials from the resident and uses an unemotional deadpan speaking tone when describing the resident's acts, before revealing that he in fact taped the acts. Monday drew criticism on his blog from people who saw the report.

The notoriety stemming from the library report led to the Dunedin Blue Jays holding 'Mustache Monday' on August 8, 2006. The promotion allowed any spectator with the first name 'Carl' or any form of 'Carl' (Carla, Karl, etc.), a surname which doubles as a day of the week (as does Monday), or those sporting a mustache to receive discounted admission. The game was postponed after lightning struck a transformer, causing a power outage.

The library piece was satirized on September 28, 2006 by Comedy Central's The Daily Show in a segment where correspondent Jason Jones put on a trench coat and attempted an ambush interview with Carl Monday. The piece ended with Jones catching up to Carl by staking out his house and asking him questions like "How do you kick a man when he's down?" in Monday's style. The segment was entitled, "Rubbing Out Crime" Monday responded in a statement on his blog.
