= Pete Franklin =

American sports talk radio host

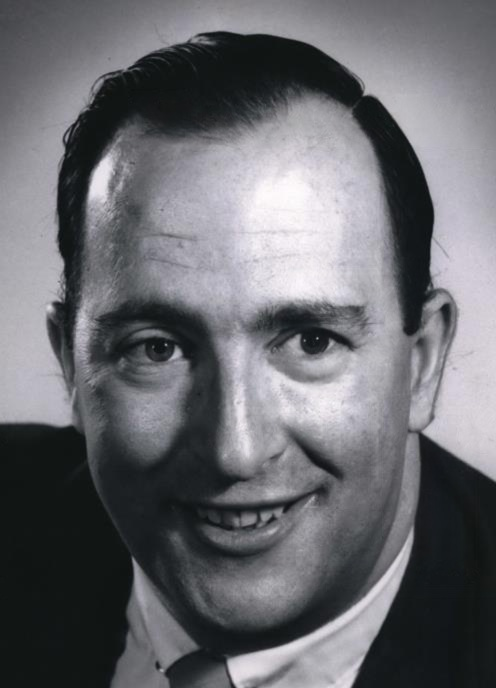
Franklin in 1968

Pete Franklin (September 22, 1927 – November 23, 2004), nicknamed "The King", "Sweet Pete" and "Pigskin Pete", was an American sports talk radio host who worked in Cleveland, New York and San Francisco. He is widely credited with pioneering the more aggressive, acerbic and attention-grabbing form of the genre, which has since been adopted by generations of sports media personalities, and bringing it to a multinational listening audience.

== Early life and career ==
Franklin was born September 22, 1927, in East Longmeadow, Massachusetts. His first broadcasting job was for Armed Forces Radio, and his first radio station job was in 1952 in Oakdale, Louisiana. "I worked 70 hours a week, and my main job was to get to the station early and kill the snakes with a baseball bat," he said of his Louisiana assignments. "They came out of the swamp to the heat of the generator. And I read the farm news. The glamour of show business."

He later worked at radio stations in North Carolina, Georgia, New Jersey, California and Texas, often as a disc jockey. He worked as operations director for WOIO in Canton, Ohio, before moving to WERE (1300 AM) in Cleveland in 1967 to host a sports talk show from 7 to 11 PM, after which he hosted a multi-subject talk show from midnight until 5 AM.

== WWWE in Cleveland ==
The zenith of Franklin's career came when he hosted Sportsline on 50,000-watt Cleveland AM station WWWE ("3WE") 1100-AM (eventually renamed WTAM) from 1972 to 1987. Arguably the most popular host on the station, he was popular for his extensive knowledge, outspoken opinions, gruff demeanor and rude banter with callers. Among his trademarks were playing the sound of a flushing toilet as he cut off callers he considered offensive, playing funeral music when the Indians were hopelessly out of contention for the season in question (thus giving them a "proper burial", usually in midsummer given their poor play at that time), his winner and the loser of the day preceded by appropriate introductory music for each, and boasting that his station's nighttime signal could be heard "over 38 states and half of Canada" (a claim still stated on air by WTAM talk-show hosts to this day).

His caustic personality was a primary reason why "3WE" lost its status as the flagship station of the NBA's Cleveland Cavaliers in 1981 when he feuded with team owner Ted Stepien. Franklin and Cavaliers' radio voice Joe Tait openly questioned Stepien's ability to operate the team after multiple poor trades and unwise free agent signings leading to a depletion of talent. He went so far as to refer to Stepien again and again by his initials, "T.S.", which Franklin said stood for "Too Stupid." Stepien retaliated by canceling WWWE's radio contract and firing Tait.

Franklin popularized several regular callers by giving them nicknames like "The Swami", "The Prosecutor", and "Mr. Know-It-All". The latter, Mike Trivisonno, eventually became a radio host and became Franklin's full-time replacement.

== Later career ==
In August 1987, Franklin announced he had been hired by upstart all-sports station WFAN in New York City to be its afternoon host starting the following month. His initial contract with the station was for two years and $600,000. But his act wore thin in the Big Apple, where critics and callers alike disliked his condescending style. New York Times columnist George Vecsey wrote that Franklin was a "so-called big name ... whose specialty was hurling insults at fans who knew vastly more than he did." After much controversy and dismal ratings, he resigned in July 1989 two months before the end of his contract, and was replaced by the Mike and the Mad Dog program.

He returned to Cleveland and "3WE" immediately afterward. The station even held a press conference to herald his homecoming. However, management dropped him after a year. He moved west, working at KNBR 680 AM in San Francisco from 1991 to 1997 and mostly hosting his show. He revived his "Winners and Losers of the Day" in sports, and his "Pigskin Pete Predicts" during the football season from his Cleveland days. He later joined Bob Fitzgerald as co-hosts of The King and The Kid.

Franklin returned for a third time to the WTAM airwaves in 1998, briefly hosting Sportsline from a studio in his California home. He joined KNBR's sister station KTCT 1050 AM in 1999, and finished his broadcasting career there in 2000.

His book entitled You Could Argue But You'd Be Wrong was published in 1988.

== Death ==
Pete Franklin died on November 23, 2004, at age 77 in Nipomo, California, after a long illness.
