= Gary Dee =

Gary David Gilbert (January 13, 1935 – November 10, 1995), on-air name Gary Dee, was a pioneer in controversial talk radio. He worked for stations which included WERE, WHK, and WWWE (now WTAM) in Cleveland, Ohio. He spent a short time in New York City, but failed to achieve the huge following he had in Ohio.

Gary Dee's style varied from a confrontational, "down home" manner, to satire, and a no-holds barred shock jock style. He paved the way for radio stars who would follow him. Gary made heavy use of country music, especially Johnny Cash and George Jones. In his tongue-in-cheek way, he would poke fun at politicians, society in general, and his own family and life.

== Biography ==
Dee was born in Hope, Arkansas. His father was a sharecropper who moved the family to Exeter, California when Dee was 11. There his father became a fire chief.

He went on to spend three semesters at the University of California, Berkeley, studying accounting. He dropped out and went on to enter the College of the Sequoias. He then finished his degree in radio and speech at Fresno State College while living in a funeral home rent-free in exchange for answering the phones at night; or at least that was the deal. Gary sublet two of his three rooms and had the other college students do the work. While in Fresno, he was on-air at KYNO, the Gene Chenault-owned Top-40 station that was an early stop for famed programmer Bill Drake. He appeared on-air at KYNO and cross-town rival KMAK in both Top-40 and country incarnations.

In 1972, Cleveland, Ohio radio station WERE hired him from Fresno, California where he had been a country music disc jockey and advertising agency owner. At the time, he idolized television talk show host Joe Pyne, who pioneered the confrontational style of hosting in which the host advocates a viewpoint and argues with guests and audience members. WERE itself was transitioning into a talk format dubbed "People Power," with an emphasis on controversial hosts and an in-your-face approach. Dee became the linchpin of the new format, and quickly became the highest-rated talk show host in Cleveland.

After an ownership change at WERE in 1975, country music outlet WHK hired away Dee to be their new morning show host, where he continued to enjoy successful ratings for almost a decade. In the late 1970s, however, Dee himself made news headlines for breaking the nose of his then wife Liz Richards, who was a WEWS-TV news anchor and co-host of that stations' high-profile breakfast television show, The Morning Exchange. Richard's divorce from Dee was highly publicized as well.

Dee became one of the best known (and most listened to) talk hosts in Cleveland. He was known for his encounters with politicians—especially legendary Cleveland City Councilman George Forbes, who would go on the air with Gary, often trading jabs until both were laughing so hard they could not continue.

After a brief stint in New York and Washington, DC (at WPKX-FM, now WMAL-FM), Dee returned to Cleveland's WWWE (now WTAM) in the 1980s. Highlights of this period included Dee finding out, on the air, that his beloved wooden boat (the Lyman, as he would refer to it) had been burned while docked outside of the city. Gary also had on-air encounters with his son, who Gary claimed was using illegal substances, and stealing from him. Dee's son later became a radio announcer.

Dee left WWWE after one of several ownership changes. His health began to fail, but he did return to WERE in the early 1990s for a brief run before his death of heart failure following a stroke on November 10, 1995.
