= Mike Trivisonno =

American radio broadcaster (1947–2021)

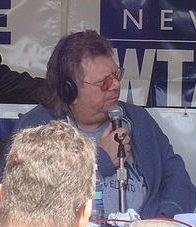
- Born: Michael Joseph Trivisonno; September 20, 1947; East Cleveland, Ohio, U.S.
- Died: October 28, 2021 (aged 74)
- Occupation: Radio Broadcaster
- Spouse(s): Linda Conforto (m. 1968; died 2009) Tamera Merves (m. 2011)

Michael Joseph Trivisonno (September 20, 1947 – October 28, 2021) was an American radio broadcaster, known for hosting his own self-titled afternoon talk show on Cleveland radio station WTAM AM 1100. He was widely referred to simply as "Triv" by callers and the Cleveland media.

== Career ==
He was a frequent caller on the Sportsline radio show on WTAM AM 1100 (during this period the station was operating under the WWWE call letters). The show was hosted by the acerbic Pete Franklin and dealt with Cleveland sports. Franklin, who would typically cut off most callers, began giving "Mike from Mayfield" some latitude due to knowledgeable commentary, particularly regarding the Cleveland Browns. Franklin began mockingly referring to Trivisonno as "Mr. Know It All," a moniker he would carry into his own radio career.

Trivisonno eventually began his own broadcasting career in 1987, working for a time at WNCX, commenting on sports (particularly boxing) and becoming a full-time personality from 1989–1992.

He began hosting Sportsline on WWWE in 1994. At first, the show aired from 6-11 p.m. The show did well in the ratings, even though it was usually up against Cleveland Indians games on WKNR. It did so well, the decision was made to put Trivisonno in afternoon drive-time (under the Sportsline banner until 1998; under his own name since) ultimately leaving Sportsline to other hosts. Throughout the program's history, The Mike Trivisonno Show was usually either first or second in ratings in its time slot in the market.

His show had been originally dedicated mostly to sports, but over time became a forum for discussing sports, politics, local issues, current events, or whatever else was on Trivisonno's mind at the time. He discussed topics (and frequently argued) with listeners who called in to the show and/or with his various producers and sidekicks that worked alongside him.

Trivisonno's popularity and high ratings led him to be ranked numerous times among Talkers Magazine's "Heavy Hundred", including most recently in 2015, when he came in at #72. He was also a nominee for the Large Market Personality of the Year Marconi Award in 2010.

== Personal life ==
Trivisonno was born in East Cleveland, Ohio, and attended Mayfield High School in Cleveland's eastern suburbs. He was married to his high school sweetheart Linda Conforto, who died of lung and brain cancer in 2009, at age 61. The couple have three children, two sons and a daughter, and two grandchildren.

On April 1, 2011, Trivisonno married his girlfriend, Tami in Las Vegas. His brother, Gary, a golfer, was also a radio personality on WTAM, hosting a weekly golf show. His son, Michael Jr., owns an upscale restaurant called Trivs in suburban Strongsville, Ohio.

He died unexpectedly on October 28, 2021, at the age of 74. The cause of death is unknown.
