= Gray Broadcast Sports Networks =

American regional sports network

- Type: Regional sports network group
- Country: United States
- Broadcast area: Available in most markets (through regional affiliates)

Programming
- Language: English

Ownership
- Owner: Gray Media
- Sister channels: List of stations owned or operated by Gray Media

Links
- Website: graymedia.com/brands/gray-sports-networks/

The Gray Broadcast Sports Networks are a group of regional sports networks, distributed via terrestrial television, in the United States owned by Gray Media. The networks carry regional broadcasts of sporting events from various local professional, collegiate, and high school sports teams.

Gray Media, across these networks and its other owned television stations, also airs a limited amount of national sports programming. As of 2025, Gray airs national programming from the Professional Women's Hockey League, the American Association of Professional Baseball, the National Collegiate Hockey Conference, Fight Sports, and the Military Basketball Association.

== Overview ==
In June 2022, Gray launched the Silver State Sports & Entertainment Network on the second subchannel of KVVU-TV in Las Vegas. At launch, the network acquired the rights to air select sporting events from the University of Nevada, Las Vegas. In January 2023, Gray launched a second sports channel, Arizona's Family Sports, through low-power station KPHE-LD in Phoenix. This channel launched with the television rights for Phoenix Rising FC of USL Championship and Arizona Interscholastic Association athletic events. In April 2023, Gray launched The Wax on WWAX-LD in Hartford, Connecticut. WWAX launched with broadcast agreements for the Connecticut Interscholastic Athletic Conference, Quinnipiac University, Sacred Heart University and Trinity College.

In early 2023, the Bally Sports Regional Networks and AT&T SportsNet, two of the largest regional sports network (RSN), were facing large economic uncertainly. In February 2023, AT&T SportsNet, announced it would leave the RSN business. In March 2023, Bally Sports announced they were filing for Chapter 11 bankruptcy. As a result, Gray expressed interest to media outlets in acquiring some of the larger professional television rights previously held by these networks.

In April 2023, Gray announced a broadcast agreement with the National Basketball Association's Phoenix Suns and Women's National Basketball Association's Phoenix Mercury. The agreement marked the first time Gray acquired the rights to exclusively air a big four professional sports team. The Suns and Mercury previously aired on Bally Sports Arizona. Games air on Arizona's Family Sports, which was expanded to the 13.5 subchannel of Gray-owned KOLD-TV in Tucson, and new stations in Yuma and Flagstaff.

Gray has continued to announce new sports networks. In October 2023, Gray launched Peachtree Sports Network in Georgia and Alabama. In July 2024, through a joint venture with Rock Entertainment Group, Gray launched Rock Entertainment Sports Network in Ohio. In August 2024, Gray launched Matrix Midwest in St. Louis and Palmetto Sports & Entertainment in South Carolina. In December 2024, Gray launched Tennessee Valley Sports & Entertainment Network. In late 2025, Gray launched North Star Sports & Entertainment Network in Minnesota, Last Frontier Sports and Entertainment Network in Alaska, Midsouth Sports and Entertainment Network in Memphis, and Great Lakes Sports & Entertainment Network in Michigan.

In September 2024, Gray announced an exclusive broadcast agreement with the New Orleans Pelicans of the National Basketball Association. The Pelicans are the second NBA team, after the Suns, to reach an exclusive agreement with Gray. Gray announced that Pelicans games would air on Gulf Coast Sports & Entertainment Network, which launched in October 2024 across Louisiana, Mississippi and Alabama.

In February 2026, Gray expanded its agreement with the Atlanta Braves of Major League Baseball. Gray exclusively broadcast 15 Spring Training games across its networks in the Southern United States. During the regular season, Gray announced it would produce all locally televised Braves games on the newly launched BravesVision network through its Raycom Sports subsidiary. 25 regular season games will be simulcast on Gray's over-the-air stations.

In April 2026, Gray Media launched Rose City SportsNet in Portland in partnership with RAJ Sports. The network is focused on women's sports and airs games featuring the Portland Fire of the WNBA and the Portland Thorns of the NWSL. Both teams are owned by RAJ Sports. The next month, Gray launched Golden Spike Sports and Entertainment Network in Nebraska in partnership with the Omaha Storm Chasers of Minor League Baseball.

== Networks ==
‡Indicates a station not owned by Gray Media

Network	Station(s)	Current rights
Arizona's Family Sports	KAZF (Flagstaff, AZ); KPHE-LD (Phoenix, AZ); KOLD-DT3 (Tucson, AZ); KAZS (Yuma, AZ)	Arizona Cardinals (NFL); Arizona State men's hockey (NCHC); Arizona Interscholastic Association (HS); Grand Canyon University (NCAA D1); Phoenix Rising FC (USL Championship); Phoenix Suns (NBA); Phoenix Mercury (WNBA); Valley Suns (NBA G League)
Last Frontier Sports and Entertainment Network	KFXF-CD (Fairbanks, AK)	Seattle Kraken (NHL); Seattle Mariners (MLB); Minnesota Vikings (NFL preseason); Chicago Bears (NFL preseason)
Great Lakes Sports & Entertainment Network	WNEM-DT2 (Bay City/Saginew/Flint, MI)	Detroit Red Wings (NHL); Great Lakes Loons (MILB); Detroit Tigers (MLB); Saginaw Spirit (OHL)
Golden Spike Sports and Entertainment Network	WOWT-DT6 (Omaha, NE)	Iowa High School Athletic Association; Kansas City Royals (MLB); Omaha Storm Chasers (MiLB); Omaha high school football; Union Omaha (ULSL1)
Gulf Coast Sports & Entertainment Network	KLGC-DT2 / KALB-DT4 (Alexandria, LA); WAFB-DT3 (Baton Rouge, LA); WTBL-DT3 / WLOX-DT6 (Biloxi, MS); WBRC-DT3 (Birmingham, AL); WLHA-DT2 / WDAM-DT5 (Hattiesburg, MS); WLBT-DT3 (Jackson, MS); KGCH-LD (Lake Charles, LA); WOOK-DT5 / WTOK-DT5 (Merdian, MS); WALA-DT5 (Mobile, AL); KCWL-LD / KNOE-TV (Monroe, LA); WSFA-DT3 (Montgomery, AL); WVUE-DT (New Orleans, LA); KSLA-DT2 (Shreveport, LA)	Atlanta Braves (MLB); Biloxi Shuckers (MiLB); Birmingham Bulls (SPHL); Louisiana High School Athletic Association (HS); Mississippi High School Activities Association (HS); New Orleans Gold (MLR); New Orleans Pelicans (NBA); New Orleans Saints (NFL); Pensacola Ice Flyers (SPHL)
Matrix Midwest	KMOV (St. Louis, MO); KTIV-DT7 (Sioux City, IA); WHOI (Peoria, IL); WQWQ-DT2 (Cape Girardeau, MO)	Iowa High School Athletic Association; Kansas City Royals (MLB); Minnesota Twins (MLB); Springfield Cardinals (MiLB); St. Louis Cardinals (MLB); St. Louis City SC (MLS); St. Louis Blues (NHL); St. Louis Shock (MLP); Memphis Redbirds (MiLB); Missouri Valley Conference basketball (NCAA D1); Ohio Valley Conference basketball (NCAA D1); Illinois High School Association (HS)
Midsouth Sports and Entertainment Network	WMC-DT3 (Memphis, TN); WBBJ-DT2 (Jackson, TN)	Atlanta Braves (MLB); Cincinnati Reds (MLB); Memphis FC (USL2); Memphis Grizzlies (NBA); Memphis Redbirds (MiLB); St. Louis Cardinals (MLB); Tennessee Secondary School Athletic Association
North Star Sports & Entertainment Network	KXLT-DT2 (Rochester, MN); KBJR-DT3 (Duluth, MN); KMNF-DT3 (Mankato, MN)	Bethany Lutheran College athletics (NCAA D3); Coachella Valley Invitational; Iowa High School Athletic Association; Minnesota Duluth Bulldogs men's ice hockey (NCAA D1); Minnesota Timberwolves (NBA); Minnesota Twins (MLB); Minnesota State University athletics (NCAA D2); Minnesota State High School League (HS); Minnesota Vikings (NFL preseason); Minnesota Wild (NHL); North Star FC (UPSL); Rochester FC (USL2/USLW); St. Paul Saints (MiLB); World Junior Ice Hockey Championships
Palmetto Sports & Entertainment	WRDW-DT3 (Augusta, GA); WCSC-DT7 (Charleston, SC); WIS-DT4 (Columbia, SC); WHNS-DT2 (Greenville, SC); WMBF-DT3 (Myrtle Beach, SC)	Atlanta Braves (MLB); Carolina Hogs (MLP); Carolina Hurricanes (NHL); Charleston Battery (USL Championship); Charlotte Hornets (NBA); Charleston RiverDogs (MILB); Columbia Fireflies (MILB); Furman Paladins (NCAA D1); Greenville Drive (MILB); Greenville Liberty SC (USL W League); Greenville Swamp Rabbits (ECHL); Greenville Triumph (USL League 1); Gwinnett Stripers (MILB); Myrtle Beach Pelicans (MILB); South Carolina Stingrays (ECHL); University of South Carolina Upstate athletics (NCAA D1); Wofford College athletics
Peachtree Sports Network	WPCH-DT2 (Atlanta, GA); WGCW-DT4 (Albany, GA); WAGT-DT3 (Augusta, GA); WTVM-DT3 (Columbus, GA); WPGA-LD (Macon, GA); WPHJ-DT3 (Savannah, GA)	Athens Rock Lobsters (FPHL); Atlanta Bouncers (MLP); Atlanta Braves (MLB); Atlanta Dream (WNBA); Atlanta Gladiators (ECHL); Atlanta Hawks (NBA); Atlanta Hustle (UFA); Atlanta Vibe (PVF); Augusta University (NCAA D2); College Park Skyhawks (NBA G League); Georgia Swarm (NLL); Gwinnett Stripers (MILB); Score Atlanta (HS)
Red River Valley Sports Network	KAUZ-DT2 (Wichita Falls, TX)	
Rock Entertainment Sports Network	WXIX-DT3 (Cincinnati, OH); WOHZ-CD / WTCL-LD (Cleveland, OH); WDEM-CD‡ (Columbus, OH); WZCD-LD (Dayton, OH)	Akron RubberDucks (MILB); Cincinnati Reds (MLB); Cleveland Cavaliers (NBA); Cleveland Charge (NBA G League); Cleveland Crunch (MLIS); Cleveland Monsters (AHL); Cleveland State Vikings basketball (NCAA D1); Columbus Clippers (MiLB); Columbus Fury (PVF); Columbus Sliders (MLP); John Carroll University men's basketball and football (NCAA DIII); Lake Erie Crushers (MILB); Miami RedHawks ice hockey (NCAA D1); St. Edward Eagles football (HS)
Rose City SportsNet	KPDX (Portland, OR); KUBN-LD (Bend, OR)	Portland Thorns (NWSL); Portland Fire (WNBA); Portland State Vikings football (NCAA D1); Portland Classic (LPGA)
The Wax	WWAX-LD (Hartford, CT)	Boston Red Sox (MLB); CIAC (HS); CT United FC (MLSNP); Hartford Athletic (USLC); Monmouth University athletics (NCAA D1); New Britain Bees (FCBL); Norwich Sea Unicorns (FCBL); Sacred Heart University athletics (NCAA D1); Quinnipiac University athletics (NCAA D1); University of Connecticut athletics (NCAA D1)
Tennessee Valley Sports & Entertainment Network	WAFF-DT3 (Huntsville, AL); WSMV-DT2 (Nashville, TN); WVLT-DT2 (Knoxville, TN); WBGS-CD3 (Bowling Green, KY); WTVL-CD2 (Chattanooga, TN)	Athletes Unlimited pro basketball; Atlanta Braves (MLB); Memphis Grizzlies (NBA); Huntsville Havoc (SPHL); Ohio Valley Conference basketball (NCAA D1); University of Tennessee athletics
Silver State Sports & Entertainment Network	KVVU-DT2 (Las Vegas, NV)	Athletics (MLB); A7FL; Las Vegas Aviators (MILB; Las Vegas Desert Dogs (NLL); Las Vegas Lights FC (USLC); Tahoe Knight Monsters (ECHL); University of Nevada, Las Vegas (NCAA D1); Vegas Knight Hawks (IFL); Vegas Thrill (PVF)
South Texas Sports	KXNU-DT2 (Laredo, TX)	Texas Rangers (MLB); Tecolotes de los Dos Laredos (LMB)
