= Rock Entertainment Sports Network =

Regional sports TV channel in Ohio

- Type: Sports-focused broadcast television network
- Country: United States
- Broadcast area: Statewide Ohio
- Network: Gray Broadcast Sports Networks
- Stations: See § Stations
- Headquarters: Cleveland, Ohio, U.S.

Ownership
- Owner: Gray Media
- Key people: Michael Conley, President

History
- Launched: May 7, 1990, with the launch of W50BE (now WOHZ-CD) in Mansfield, Ohio

Links
- Website: RESN website

The Rock Entertainment Sports Network (RESN) is a broadcast television network in Ohio, United States. Based in Cleveland, it is owned by Gray Media as part of their Gray Broadcast Sports Networks division and co-managed by Rock Entertainment Group, headed by Dan Gilbert. its programming consists primarily of local sporting events.

RESN operates alongside CBS affiliate WOIO (channel 19), WUAB (channel 43), an independent station with MyNetworkTV, and Telemundo affiliate WTCL-LD (channel 6). It is broadcast by Canton, Ohio–licensed low-power station WOHZ-CD (channel 22) from a transmitter located northeast of Canton; in Cleveland on a subchannel of WTCL-LD, with transmitter located in Parma; in Akron on W28FG-D, a translator for both WOHZ and WTCL; in Columbus on low-power station WDEM-CD (channel 17), owned by Innovate Corp.; in Dayton on low-power station WZCD-LD (channel 32); and in Cincinnati on a subchannel of Fox affiliate WXIX-TV.

WOHZ-CD, the low-power station Gray purchased to launch RESN, was on the air in 1990 in Mansfield, Ohio, originally on channel 50. Initially offering local community programming and newscasts, this programming largely migrated to co-owned full-power WMFD-TV when that station signed on. By the 2010s, the station aired programming from varied sources, including weather information and audio simulcasts of WVNO-FM. Gray purchased the station in late 2020 and operated it as a relay for the combined multiplex of WOIO and WUAB, then fully relaying WTCL's multiplex. RESN launched on August 23, 2024, with plans to carry Cleveland Charge basketball, Cleveland Monsters hockey, Lake Erie Crushers baseball and St. Edward High School football.

== History of WOHZ-CD ==
Originally licensed to Mansfield, Ohio, this station took to the air on May 7, 1990, as W50BE. An extension of locally owned WVNO-FM and WRGM, W50BE was an independent station boasting a lineup of local newscasts and community programming for the Mansfield–Ashland–Bucyrus region, nearly equidistant from both the Cleveland and Columbus markets. After W50BE owner Mid-State Television, Inc., headed by Robert Meisse, acquired the license to WCOM-TV, that station was relaunched as WMFD-TV "TV68/50" on June 1, 1992, simulcasting W50BE's programming.

By the beginning of 1996, W50BE changed call signs to WOHZ-LP and was relaunched as "Z-50", offering additional local programming as a WMFD-TV extension alongside America One fare. Later upgraded to a Class A station as WOHZ-CA, it also began to offer weather information and an audio simulcast of WVNO-FM from a combined studio facility in Ontario, Ohio. The station was licensed for digital operation on February 26, 2015, assuming the call sign WOHZ-CD.

On October 8, 2020, Mid-State Television sold WOHZ-CD to Atlanta–based Gray Television, owner of WOIO and WUAB, for $450,000. The sale was completed on December 8, 2020. Upon taking over WOHZ-CD, Gray Television changed the station's city of license to Canton, and began using it as a UHF repeater for WOIO and WUAB, increasing coverage for those stations in the southern part of the Cleveland television market.

== Launch of RESN ==
Original RESN logo

In partnership with Dan Gilbert's Rock Entertainment Group, Gray Television announced the launch of the Rock Entertainment Sports Network (RESN), an over-the-air regional sports network, on July 25, 2024. RESN announced it would carry Cleveland Monsters hockey, Cleveland Charge basketball, Lake Erie Crushers minor league baseball (MILB), and St. Edward Eagles high school football, along with additional high school sports and college sports coverage. (Both the Monsters and Charge are owned by Gilbert, while the Crushers are owned by former Gilbert associate Len Komoroski.) In addition to originating over both WOHZ-CD and WTCL-LD (channel 6), RESN was also included over a subchannel of co-owned WXIX-TV in Cincinnati, and promised additional play-by-play of local college and professional sports teams in the future.

Despite also being owned by Gilbert, the Cleveland Cavaliers were not included in the initial plans for RESN due to that team's existing contract with FanDuel Sports Network Ohio, whose parent company Diamond Sports (now Main Street Sports Group) was undergoing a prolonged Chapter 11 Bankruptcy reorganization; the contract ran through the 2024–25 season. FDSN, then known as Bally Sports Ohio, previously offered five Cavaliers games to Gray Television owned WUAB during the second half of the 2023–24 season and the team expressed disappointment over the cable channel's lack of audience reach and financial issues. Gray previously launched similar regional sports channels elsewhere including Arizona's Family Sports, the Gulf Coast Sports & Entertainment Network and Peachtree Sports Network, but RESN represented the first such channel created as a joint venture with team ownership. While the Cavaliers did not rule out re-signing with FDSN after the season, team officials expressed a desire to reach viewers on multiple platforms, from linear television to over-the-top and mobile streaming to virtual reality headsets.

RESN officially launched on August 23, 2024, with the inaugural broadcast being St. Edward's season opener against Pickerington North. On October 9, 2024, RESN agreed to carry John Carroll Blue Streaks men's basketball and football games. Columbus Fury volleyball matches were also added on January 2, 2025.

Following the announcement of WUAB's disaffiliation from The CW on September 1, 2025, Gray concurrently announced WUAB's future relaunch as a sports-oriented independent heavily featuring RESN play-by-play; WUAB has since added over-the-air simulcasts of Monsters and Charge games, along with ancillary team-produced programming. WDEM-CD, a low-power station in Columbus, Ohio, began carrying RESN on their primary feed on December 4, 2024. The Cincinnati feed over WXIX-DT3 was set up to substitute programming for local sports coverage and was included with WXIX's addition of ten Cincinnati Reds 2025 regular season games, all simulcast with FDSN. By March 2025, RESN added WZCD-LD, a low-power station in Dayton, Ohio.

On January 21, 2025, WUAB and RESN jointly announced the addition of five regular-season Cavaliers games in the second half of the 2024–25 season; WUAB and RESN would simulcast FDSN's broadcasts. In May 2025, RESN announced an agreement to air fifteen Akron RubberDucks Eastern League games. Michael Conley, a Rock Entertainment Group executive who oversaw RESN's launch, was named as the network's first president on August 12, 2025. In September 2026, it was announced that the regional broadcast rights to the Cavs would be taken over by DAZN, with RESN producing the broadcasts.

== Stations ==
RESN is currently broadcast in the Cleveland, Columbus, Dayton and Cincinnati media markets. Since November 2024, it has also been available on Spectrum Cable throughout Greater Cleveland. For further information on WDEM-CD and WXIX-TV, consult those articles.

Rock Entertainment Sports Network primary stations
Station	City of license	Channel	FID	ERP	HAAT	Transmitter coordinates	First air date	Former call signs	Public license information
WOHZ-CD	Canton	20	41892	15 kW	605.3 m (1,986 ft)	40°53′24″N 81°16′11″W	May 7, 1990	W50BE (1989–1995); WOHZ-LP (1995–2005); WOHZ-CA (2005–2015)	Public file; LMS
WTCL-LD	Cleveland	20	6699	15 kW	306.8 m (1,007 ft)	41°22′45″N 81°43′11″W	November 30, 1989	W47BE (1989–1998); W65DL (1998–2000); WXOX-LP (2000–2012); WLFM-LP (2012–2020); WLFM-LD (2020–2021); WTCL-LP (2021–2022)	LMS
W28FG-D	Akron	28	184642	15 kW	564.2 m (1,851 ft)	41°3′52.7″N 81°34′58.3″W	c. 2011	—N/a	LMS
WZCD-LD	Dayton	32	187440	14.3 kW	272.8 m (895 ft)	39°43′28.6″N 84°15′17.6″W	c. 2012	W42EP-D (2012–2021)	LMS

=== Technical information and subchannels ===
WOHZ-CD transmits from a tower in northeastern Canton, Ohio, WTCL-LD transmits from a tower in Parma, Ohio, and W28FG-D transmits from a tower in Copley Township, Ohio. All three stations carry the same subchannel lineup and operate as translators of each other:

Subchannels of WTCL-LD, WOHZ-CD, and W28FG-D
Subchannel	Res.	Short name	Programming
6.1	1080i	TLMD	Telemundo
19.10	480i	WOIOHD	CBS (WOIO simulcast)
22.1	720p	RESN	Rock Entertainment Sports Network

Simulcast of subchannels of another station

WZCD-LD transmits from a tower in southwestern Dayton, Ohio. This station's signal is multiplexed:

Subchannels of WZCD-LD
Subchannel	Res.	Short name	Programming
32.1	720p	WZCD-LD	Rock Entertainment Sports Network
32.2	480i	Telemun	Telemundo
32.3	480i	JTV	Jewelry TV
32.4	480i	QVC	QVC
32.5	480i	QVC2	QVC2
32.6	480i	BUSTED	Busted

=== Network map ===
Grade A signal contours for stations affiliated with Rock Entertainment Sports Network.
