= Cleveland Monsters =

American Hockey League team in Cleveland, Ohio

- City: Cleveland, Ohio
- League: American Hockey League
- Conference: Eastern
- Division: North
- Founded: 1994 (IHL)
- Operated: 2007–present
- Home arena: Rocket Arena
- Colors: Lake blue, Bessie black, Monster Eye gold, white
- Owner: Dan Gilbert
- General manager: Chris Clark
- Head coach: Nick Bootland
- Captain: Owen Sillinger
- Media: Radio: WMMS-HD2/W256BT; WTAM (select games); TV: WUAB; RESN - encompassing: WTCL-LD Cleveland; WOHZ-CD Canton; W28FG-D Akron; Online: AHL.TV
- Affiliates: Columbus Blue Jackets (NHL)

Franchise history
- 1994–1995: Denver Grizzlies
- 1995–2005: Utah Grizzlies
- 2007–2016: Lake Erie Monsters
- 2016–present: Cleveland Monsters

Championships
- Division titles: 1 (2023–24)
- Conference titles: 1 (2015–16)
- Calder Cups: 1 (2015–16)

The Cleveland Monsters are a professional ice hockey team based in Cleveland. They are the American Hockey League (AHL) affiliate of the Columbus Blue Jackets of the National Hockey League (NHL). The Monsters play home games at Rocket Arena in downtown Cleveland and have one Calder Cup championship, after winning their first title in 2016. The team has since held one of the highest attendance averages in the AHL, leading the league in the COVID-19 pandemic-shortened 2019–20 AHL season and all seasons since 2022–23.

== Franchise history ==
=== Early years ===
The Monsters began in 2006 when the dormant Utah Grizzlies AHL franchise was purchased on May 16, 2006, by a Cleveland ownership group led by Dan Gilbert, owner of the Cleveland Cavaliers and Quicken Loans. A new AHL team was awarded to Cleveland following the departure of the Cleveland Barons to Worcester, Massachusetts, after the 2005–06 season. With Quicken Loans Arena established as the team's home venue, the Colorado Avalanche was announced on December 17, 2006, as the franchise's first NHL parent club with a five-year agreement.

The franchise was officially announced on January 25, 2007, as the Lake Erie Monsters, referring to Bessie, a creature of local folklore. The name was chosen from researching focus groups around the Cleveland area and the logo incorporated the geographical connection in the region with Lake Erie.

Former NHL player Joe Sacco was named as the Lake Erie Monsters' first head coach, and Dave Oliver was named general manager. The Monsters opened their inaugural 2007–08 campaign with a loss at home against the Grand Rapids Griffins on October 6, 2007. The team ended the season 26–41.

At the end of the 2010–11 season, the Monsters qualified for the Calder Cup playoffs for the first time in team history. After gaining a 3–1 series lead over the Manitoba Moose in the opening round, the Monsters proceeded to lose the next three consecutive games, losing the series 4–3.

=== Blue Jackets era ===
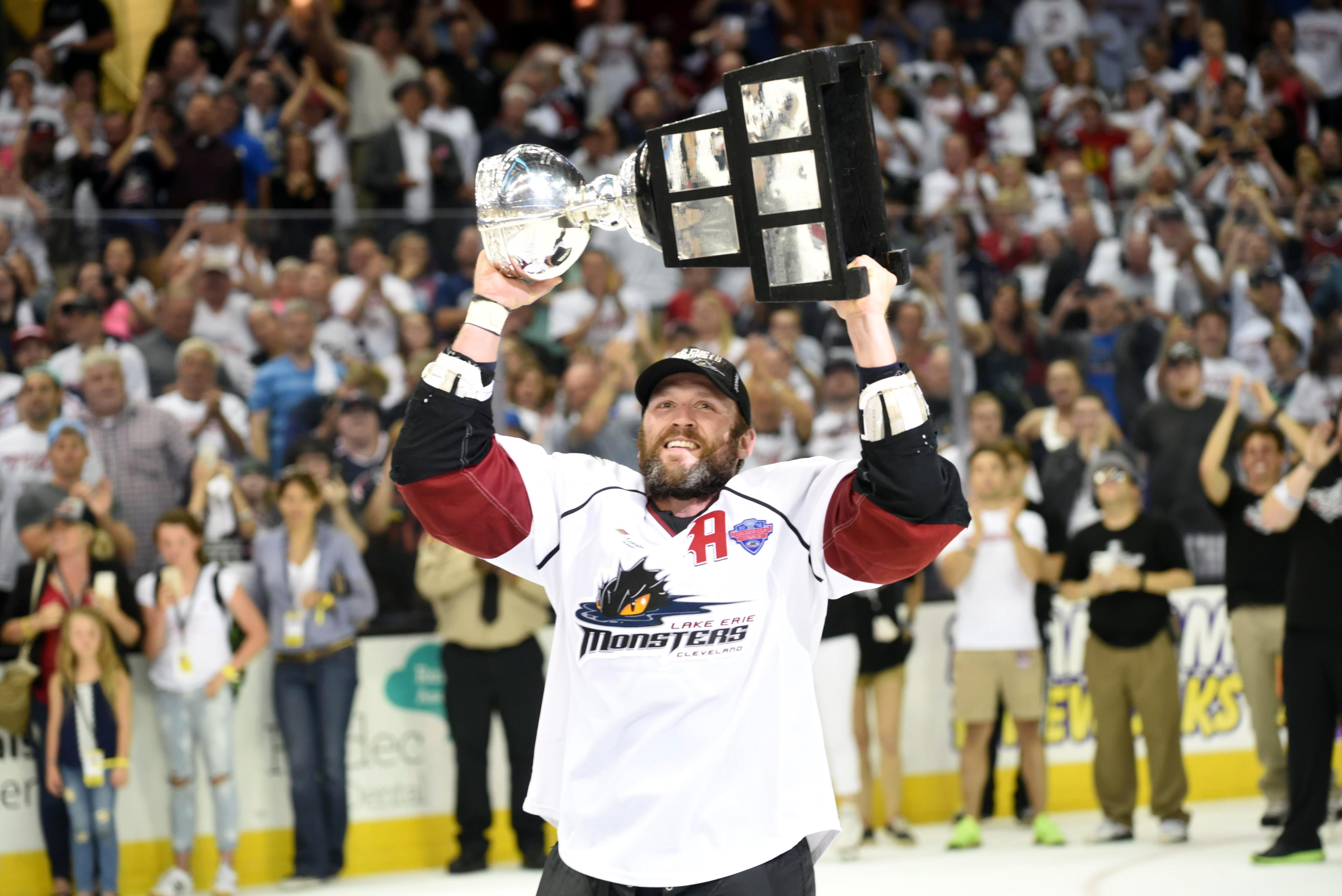
Monsters with the Calder Cup in 2016

On April 17, 2015, the Monsters announced the signing of a multi-year agreement to become the AHL affiliate for the Columbus Blue Jackets, which took effect in the 2015–16 season. The multi-season affiliation was extended in 2019.

The Monsters finished the 2015–16 season by setting a franchise record in points (97) and qualified for the playoffs for the second time in team history. On April 23, 2016, the Monsters defeated their first round opponent, the Rockford IceHogs, 5–3, ending a three-game sweep of their opponent in a best-of-five series. The Monsters advanced to the Western Conference Semifinals to play the Grand Rapids Griffins in a best-of-seven series, defeating them 4–2. They then swept the defending Calder Cup Champion Ontario Reign in the Western Conference Finals to reach their first Calder Cup Final in franchise history. On June 11, 2016, the Monsters won the franchise's first Calder Cup in a four-game sweep of the Hershey Bears, with Oliver Bjorkstrand scoring the Cup-winning goal in overtime.

This marked Cleveland's first AHL title since the Barons won their last Calder Cup in 1964, and 10th overall for a Cleveland-based AHL team. The Monsters won Game 4 before a sellout crowd of 19,665 people at Quicken Loans Arena — the second largest crowd for a professional hockey game in Ohio behind the 19,941 in a Cleveland Lumberjacks game against the Minnesota Moose in February 1996, and the second largest in Calder Cup playoff history behind the 20,103 Philadelphia Phantoms game four victory in the 2005 Calder Cup Finals over the Chicago Wolves.

On August 9, 2016, the Lake Erie Monsters changed their name to the Cleveland Monsters. The team's Calder Cup winning head coach, Jared Bednar, was then hired by the Colorado Avalanche on August 25. Under their new name and coach John Madden, the Monsters failed to qualify for the playoffs in the 2016–17 season. In the 2017–18 season, the Monsters earned last place in the Western Conference and failed to make the playoffs. The team returned to the playoffs following the 2018–19 season as the fourth seed in the North Division where they upset the division champion Syracuse Crunch before being swept by the Toronto Marlies in the division finals. Head coach John Madden then left the team and was replaced by Mike Eaves.

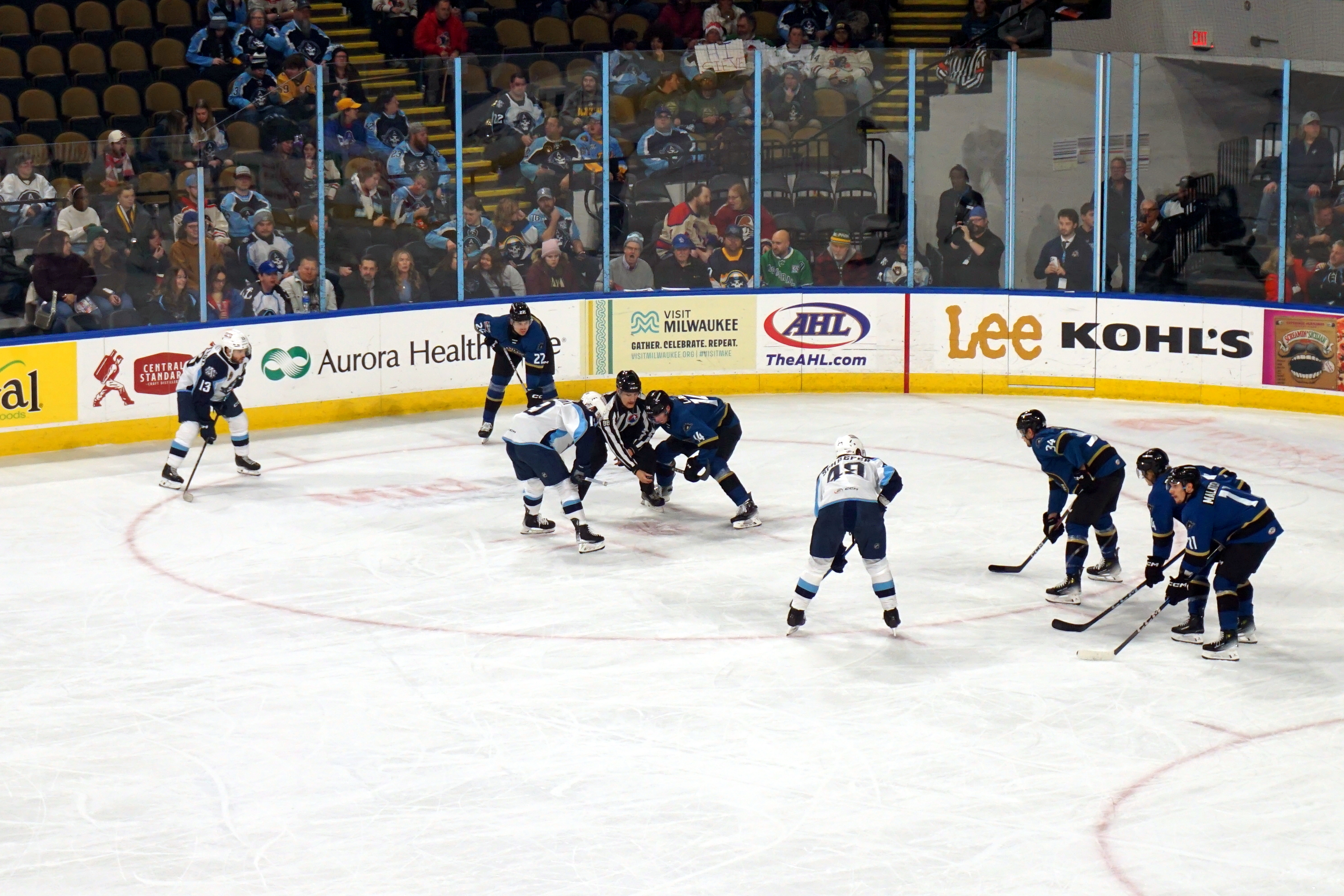
The Monsters playing at Milwaukee in 2024

The Monsters 2019–20 season was curtailed by the onset of the COVID-19 pandemic. The team ended the season in last place in their division with a record of 24–31. Owing to the ongoing effects of the pandemic, the 2020–21 season was delayed and shortened with no playoffs held in their division. They ended the season in second place within their division.

== Cleveland hockey history ==
The following teams have previously played in Cleveland. The Monsters recognize and honor past Cleveland teams with commemorative banners at Rocket Arena:

- Cleveland Indians/Falcons/Barons (1929–1936 IHL; 1936–1973 AHL) — nine-time Calder Cup champions
- Cleveland Crusaders (1972–1976) WHA
- Cleveland Barons (1976–1978) NHL
- Cleveland Lumberjacks (1992–2001) IHL
- Cleveland Barons (2001–2006) AHL

== Season-by-season results ==
Regular season											Playoffs					
Season	Games	Won	Lost	OTL	SOL	Points	PCT	Goals for	Goals against	Standing	Year	Prelims	1st round	2nd round	3rd round	Finals
2007–08	80	26	41	6	7	65	.406	209	276	6th, North	2008	Did not qualify				
2008–09	80	34	38	3	5	76	.475	199	218	6th, North	2009	Did not qualify				
2009–10	80	34	37	1	8	77	.481	234	257	6th, North	2010	Did not qualify				
2010–11	80	44	28	3	5	96	.600	223	206	2nd, North	2011	—	L, 3–4, MTB	—	—	—
2011–12	76	37	29	3	7	84	.553	189	210	3rd, North	2012	Did not qualify				
2012–13	76	35	31	3	7	80	.526	211	220	3rd, North	2013	Did not qualify				
2013–14	76	32	33	1	10	75	.492	200	235	4th, North	2014	Did not qualify				
2014–15	76	35	29	8	4	82	.539	211	240	4th, Midwest	2015	Did not qualify				
2015–16	76	43	22	6	5	97	.638	211	188	2nd, Central	2016	—	W, 3–0, RFD	W, 4–2, GR	W, 4–0, ONT	W, 4–0, HER
2016–17	76	39	29	4	4	86	.566	195	198	5th, Central	2017	Did not qualify				
2017–18	76	25	41	7	3	60	.395	190	258	7th, Central	2018	Did not qualify				
2018–19	76	37	29	8	2	84	.553	232	234	4th, North	2019	—	W, 3–1, SYR	L, 0–4, TOR	—	—
2019–20	62	24	31	5	2	55	.444	159	192	8th, North	2020	Season cancelled due to the COVID-19 pandemic				
2020–21	29	16	10	1	2	35	.603	101	86	2nd, Central	2021	No playoffs were held (Note: Season was delayed and shortened due to the lingering pandemic; Calder Cup not awarded.)				
2021–22	76	28	35	8	5	69	.454	207	262	7th, North	2022	Did not qualify				
2022–23	72	33	32	5	2	73	.507	220	254	6th, North	2023	Did not qualify				
2023–24	72	40	24	5	3	88	.611	233	238	1st, North	2024	BYE	W, 3–1, BEL	W, 3–0, SYR	L, 3–4, HER	—
2024–25	72	35	26	5	6	81	.563	206	225	5th, North	2025	W, 2–0, TOR	L, 1–3, LAV	—	—	—
2025–26	72	37	26	6	3	83	.576	217	227	3rd, North	2026	BYE	W, 3–1, SYR	L, 2–3, TOR	—	—

== Players ==
=== Current roster ===
Updated November 19, 2026.

No.	Nat	Player	Pos	S/G	Age	Acquired	Birthplace	Contract
37	(United States)	Roman Ahcan	LW	L	27	2022	Savage, Minnesota	Monsters
24	(Sweden)	Emil Andrae	D	L	24	2026	Västervik, Sweden	Blue Jackets
25	(United States)	Riley Bezeau	RW	R	24	2025	Mansfield, Massachusetts	Blue Jackets
8	(Canada)	Boston Buckberger	D	L	23	2026	Saskatoon, Saskatchewan	Blue Jackets
4	(Canada)	Corson Ceulemans	D	R	23	2023	Regina, Saskatchewan	Blue Jackets
29	(United States)	Pheonix Copley	G	L	34	2026	North Pole, Alaska	Blue Jackets
88	(Canada)	Jordan Dumais	RW	R	22	2024	Montreal, Quebec	Blue Jackets
14	(United States)	Josh Eernisse	RW	R	24	2026	Apple Valley, Minnesota	Blue Jackets
7	(Canada)	Charlie Elick	D	R	20	2026	Villach, Austria	Blue Jackets
35	(Canada)	Evan Gardner	G	L	20	2026	Fort St. John, British Columbia	Blue Jackets
64	(Canada)	Danton Heinen	LW	L	31	2025	Langley, British Columbia	Blue Jackets
20	(Finland)	Oiva Keskinen	C	L	22	2026	Ylöjärvi, Finland	Blue Jackets
43	(Canada)	Caleb MacDonald	D	L	23	2025	Cambridge, Ontario	Blue Jackets
11	(Canada)	James Malatesta	LW	L	23	2023	Montreal, Quebec	Blue Jackets
54	(Canada)	Luca Marrelli	D	R	21	2026	Toronto, Ontario	Blue Jackets
93	(Canada)	Max McCue	C	L	23	2024	Sudbury, Ontario	Blue Jackets
53	(Canada)	Luca Pinelli	C	L	21	2025	Stoney Creek, Ontario	Blue Jackets
82	(Finland)	Mikael Pyyhtia	LW	L	24	2023	Turku, Finland	Blue Jackets
26	(Canada)	Guillaume Richard	D	L	23	2025	Quebec, Quebec	Blue Jackets
12	(Canada)	Owen Sillinger (C)	C	L	29	2022	Vancouver, British Columbia	Blue Jackets
48	(United States)	Tate Singleton	C	L	28	2025	West Lebanon, New Hampshire	Monsters
5	(Canada)	Carson Soucy	D	L	32	2026	Viking, Alberta	Blue Jackets
17	(United States)	Luke Tuch	LW	L	24	2026	Syracuse, New York	Blue Jackets
6	(Canada)	Colton White (A)	D	L	29	2026	London, Ontario	Blue Jackets

=== Team captains ===
- Mark Rycroft, 2007–08
- Wyatt Smith, 2008
- Brian Willsie, 2008–10
- David Liffiton, 2010–12
- Bryan Lerg, 2012–14
- Brian Sutherby, 2013
- Bruno Gervais, 2014–15
- Ryan Craig, 2015–17
- Nathan Gerbe, 2018–19
- Zac Dalpe, 2019–21
- Dillon Simpson, 2021–2023
- Brendan Gaunce, 2023–2024, 2025–2026
- Stefan Matteau, 2024–2025
- Owen Sillinger, 2026–present

=== American Hockey League Hall of Famers ===
AHL Hall of Fame Honored Members
Name	Seasons	Induction Year
Darren Haydar	2009-10 (player)	2020

=== Retired numbers ===
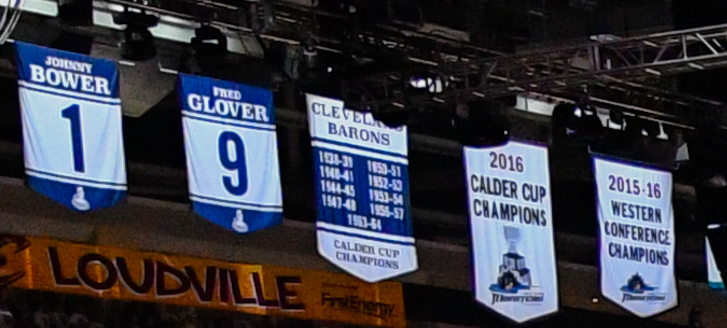
Monsters retired numbers and championship banners hanging from the rafters of Rocket Arena

No Monsters player has had his number retired. However, the team has retired the numbers of players who have played on past Cleveland franchises to honor the city's hockey history.

Cleveland Monsters retired numbers
No.	Player	Position	Team
1	Johnny Bower	G	Barons
9	Fred Glover	C	Barons
15	Jock Callander	C	Lumberjacks
27	Dave Michayluk	RW	Lumberjacks

=== Notable alumni ===
The following players have played both 100 games with the Monsters and 100 games in the National Hockey League:

- Patrick Bordeleau
- Paul Carey
- Ryan Craig
- Zac Dalpe
- Philippe Dupuis
- Nathan Gerbe
- T.J. Hensick
- Dean Kukan
- Brad Malone
- Sonny Milano
- Calvin Pickard
- Kevin Stenlund

== Team records ==
Single season
Goals: 33, Zac Dalpe (2018–19)
Assists: 50, T.J. Hensick (2009–10)
Points: 71 Trey Fix-Wolansky (2022–23)
Penalty minutes: 215, Daniel Maggio (2014–15)
Wins: 30, Jet Greaves (2023–24)
GAA: 2.11, Cédrick Desjardins (2011–12)
SV%: .932, Cédrick Desjardins (2011–12)
Shutouts: 8, Tyler Weiman (2008–09)

- Goaltending records need a minimum of 25 games played by the goaltender

Playoffs

Goals: 10, Oliver Bjorkstrand (2016)
Assists: 10, Ryan Craig (2016)
Points: 16 (tie), Oliver Bjorkstrand and Lukas Sedlak (2016)
Penalty minutes: 26, Kerby Rychel (2016)
Wins: 9, Anton Forsberg (2016)
GAA: 1.34, Anton Forsberg (2016)
SV%: .949, Anton Forsberg (2016)
Shutouts: 2, Anton Forsberg (2016)

Career
Career goals: Trey Fix-Wolansky, 112
Career assists: Trey Fix-Wolansky, 147
Career points: Trey Fix-Wolansky, 259
Career penalty minutes: Brett Gallant, 663
Career goaltending wins: Jet Greaves, 82
Career shutouts: Tyler Weiman, 13
Career games: Justin Scott, 336

Firsts and team records

- First game: October 6, 2007, vs. Grand Rapids Griffins
- First win: October 20, 2007, 3–2 vs. Syracuse Crunch
- First goal: Matt Hussey (October 6, 2007 vs. Grand Rapids Griffins)
- First shutout: Jason Bacashihua (November 15, 2007, vs. Quad City Flames)
- First hat trick: Chris Stewart (November 17, 2007, vs. Toronto Marlies)
- Most goals in a game: 4 by Patrick Rissmiller (December 3, 2010, vs. Chicago Wolves)
- Most wins in a season: 44 (2010–11)
- Most home wins in a season: 25 (2015–16)
- Most points in a season: 97 (2015–16)
- Most games won in a row: 10 (2024–25)
- First playoff game: April 16, 2011. (vs. Manitoba Moose)
- First playoff goal: April 16, 2011 (by Matthew Ford)
- First playoff win: April 16, 2011 (Monsters 6, Manitoba Moose 4)
- First playoff series win: April 23, 2016 (Monsters won series 3–0 vs. Rockford IceHogs)
- First Western Conference championship: May 26, 2016 (Monsters won series 4–0 vs. Ontario Reign)
- First Calder Cup championship: June 11, 2016 (Monsters won series 4–0 vs. Hershey Bears)

== Media ==
Radio

WMMS-HD2 100.7/W256BT 99.1 FM serves as the team's flagship outlet, with select games simulcast on sister station WTAM AM 1100/FM 106.9. Tony Brown serves as the announcer.

TV

Over 20 Monsters games will be televised on Rock Entertainment Sports Network (RESN), which is carried on sister stations WTCL-LD in Cleveland, WOHZ-CD in Canton, and W28FG-D in Akron - all on channel 22, with several of those games also simulcast on sister station and RESN affiliate WUAB channel 43.

The broadcast team consists of play-by-play broadcaster Tony Brown and former Cleveland Lumberjacks player and current Monsters vice president Jock Callander as analyst. All televised games are also simulcast on the radio.

== Mascot and entertainment ==
The Monsters' official mascot is a seagull character named "Sullivan C. Goal" (aka "Sully"). Also featured are the "Monsters Hockey Girls" cheerleaders. In March 2023, the Monsters unveiled "The Modelo Experience" which allows fans the opportunity to take ride on a custom made "fanboni"(the Modelo Fan Cruiser) built by Cleveland Power and Performance.

In 2025, the Monsters renamed themselves Cleveland Pierogis for a weekend with back-to-back games against the Wilkes-Barre/Scranton Penguins, wearing a shirt with a skating Pierogi in the colors of the flag of Poland. Cleveland has a well-known Polish-American community and had the first documented pierogi sale in North America in 1928.
