= Harry Boomer =

American journalist and reporter

- Born: September 4, 1953 (age 72); Turkey, North Carolina, United States
- Occupation(s): Radio and television news anchor/reporter
- Years active: 1971–present
- Employers: WOL (Washington, D.C.); WBXT (Canton, Ohio); WCPN (Cleveland); WOIO/WUAB (Cleveland)
- Television: After Nine (WCPN); 43 Focus (WUAB)
- Children: 1

Harry Boomer (born September 4, 1953, in Turkey, North Carolina) is a broadcast journalist, reporter and newscaster for radio and television. He currently is the senior reporter for CBS affiliate WOIO (channel 19) and CW affiliate WUAB (channel 43), both located in Cleveland, Ohio.

== Bio ==
Harry Boomer was born on September 4, 1953, as the youngest of ten siblings in Turkey, North Carolina; his father George Boomer was a Baptist minister. Boomer relocated to Washington, D.C. at age 17 after graduating high school and was hired as a disc jockey at the Mark IV Supper Club, an area discotheque. Gaining notice as one of several "Super Disco Jocks" at Black-oriented dance clubs, Boomer was hired by WPGC AM/FM as an air personality while also attending both Northern Virginia Community College in Alexandria, Virginia, and Columbia School of Broadcasting in nearby Vienna. Tiring of the music, Boomer entered into radio news reporting for various stations in the Washington market, including as news director for WOL, the city's leading Black radio station.

Boomer came to Ohio in 1988 to work at WBXT in Canton, Ohio, after the station was purchased by a friend of the family. Originally working as morning drive announcer, Boomer was elevated to program director later in the year, while also joining Cleveland television station WUAB as a volunteer in their public affairs department. After WBXT went off the air, Boomer became a producer/reporter at WUAB, and a reporter for WCPN, the city's NPR affiliate. At WCPN, Boomer was promoted to assistant news director and host of After Nine, the station's morning newsmagazine, while his WUAB work began to include co-managed WOIO after that station became the market's CBS affiliate. Boomer moderated a hotly contested 1992 debate between Rep. Mary Rose Oakar and challenger Martin Hoke. An advocate for prospective African-American journalists to pursue internships, Boomer's position at WCPN was noted by Plain Dealer critic Roger Brown in his criticism of "downright woeful" Black representation on Cleveland radio.

Boomer's WOIO-WUAB duties continued to expand, in 1997, he was named the station's education reporter in a personnel shakeup. By 2006, Boomer was promoted to breaking news reporter/anchor on WOIO's weekday morning newscast and later added hosting duties for 43 Focus, WUAB's weekly public affairs program. He is now recognized by WOIO-WUAB as their longest tenured on-air staffer.

Boomer received the 2015 Silver Circle Award from the National Academy of Television Arts and Sciences (NATAS), a distinction given for at least 25 years in television. In addition to multiple community groups and organizations, Boomer has been president of the Greater Cleveland Association of Black Journalists, a chapter of the National Association of Black Journalists. Twice during Boomer's leadership, the chapter has been named the NABJ Professional Chapter of the Year, most recently in 2016.

In 2014, Boomer was named a HistoryMaker and an oral video of his life's story is part of a permanent archive at the Library of Congress.

== Awards ==
- 1996 Cleveland Communicators' Award: Best Hard Single News Story (Anti-Gingrich Protest)
- 1996 Cleveland Communicators' Award: Best Public Service Program (The Subject is Sex)
- 1996 Ohio Educational Telecommunications Network Program of the Year (The Subject is Sex)
- 1996 Ohio Educational Telecommunications Network News and Public Affairs Program (The Subject is Sex)
- Ohio Broadcasters Hall of Fame 2007 inductee
- 2014 HistoryMaker/Library of Congress
- 2015 NATAS Silver Circle Award
- 2022 NATAS Gold Circle Award
