= WOIO =

Television station in Shaker Heights, Ohio

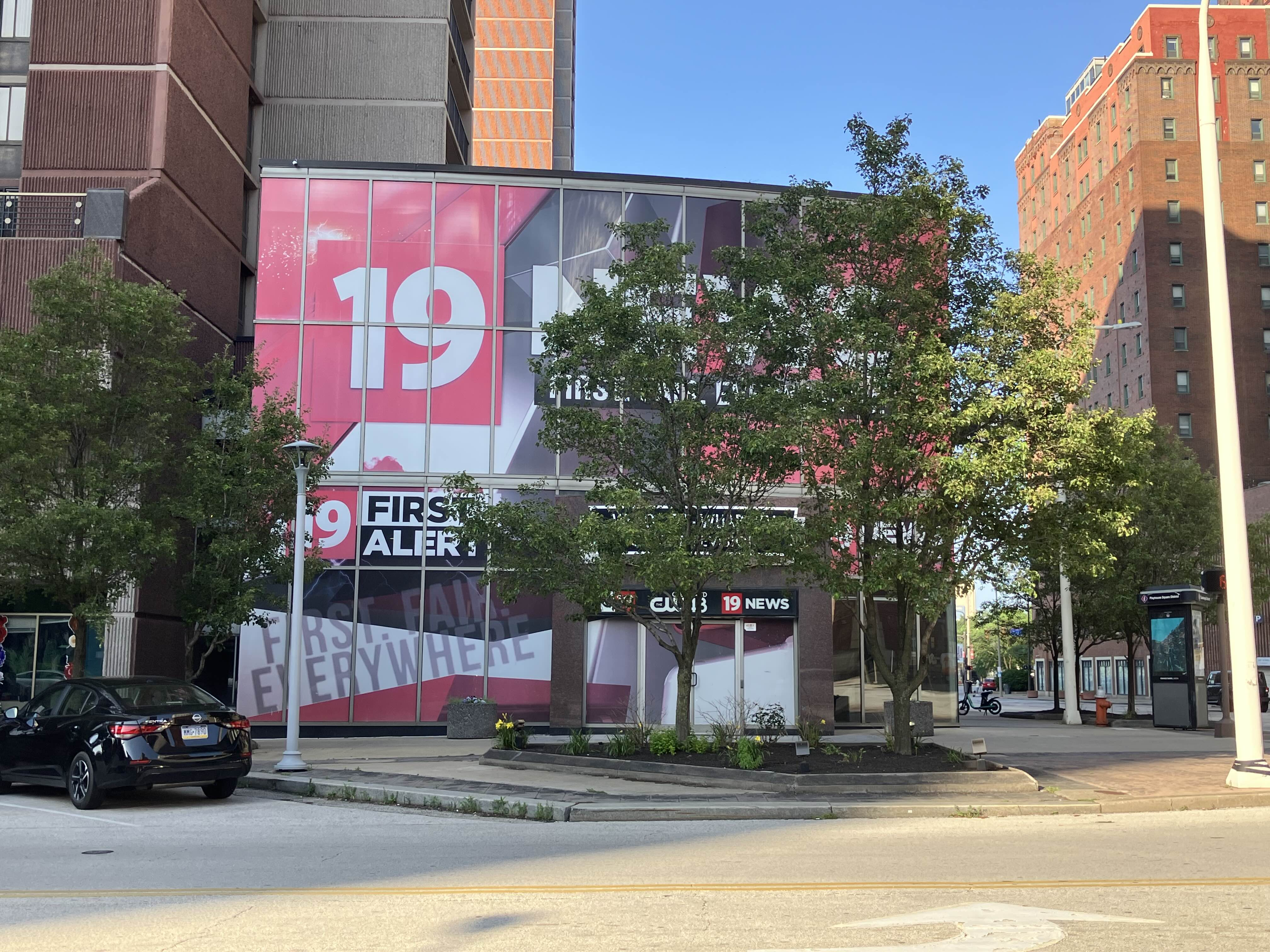
- WOIO's studios at Reserve Square in downtown Cleveland
- Shaker Heights–Cleveland, Ohio; United States
- City: Shaker Heights, Ohio
- Channels: Digital: 10 (VHF), shared with WUAB; Virtual: 19
- Branding: 19 WOIO; 19 News

Programming
- Affiliations: 19.1: CBS; for others, see § Subchannels

Ownership
- Owner: Gray Media; (Gray Television Licensee, LLC)
- Sister stations: WUAB, WTCL-LD, WOHZ-CD

History
- First air date: May 19, 1985
- Former channel numbers: Analog: 19 (UHF, 1985–2009)
- Former affiliations: Independent (1985–1986); Fox (1986–1994); MyNetworkTV (19.2, 2018–2025)
- Call sign meaning: "Ohio"

Technical information
- Licensing authority: FCC
- Facility ID: 39746
- ERP: 30 kW
- HAAT: 333 m (1,093 ft)
- Transmitter coordinates: 41°22′45″N 81°43′11″W
- Translator(s): see § Translators

Links
- Public license information: Public file; LMS
- Website: www.cleveland19.com

WOIO (channel 19) is a television station licensed to Shaker Heights, Ohio, United States, serving the Cleveland area as an affiliate of CBS. It is owned by Gray Media alongside WUAB (channel 43)—an independent station with MyNetworkTV—and two low-power stations: Telemundo affiliate WTCL-LD (channel 6) and WOHZ-CD (channel 22), both of which also serve as translators for WOIO. All four stations have studios on the ground floor of the Reserve Square building in Downtown Cleveland. WOIO shares full-power spectrum with WUAB via a channel sharing agreement; both stations have transmitter facilities in suburban Parma.

Established in 1985, WOIO's entry into the Cleveland market was the culmination of multiple failed attempts to sign on a station on channel 19 over the course of 34 years, four different construction permits and multiple contested bids. Owned initially by a consortium controlled by Hubert B. Payne, the first Black executive at a Cleveland television station, WOIO was sold to Malrite Communications, one of the partners in the consortium, in 1986 for a capital infusion. With studios at Shaker Square, WOIO operated with a minimum of local output but boasted a unique "nineteen" identity and irreverent on-air persona, along with a lineup of long-established reruns that appealed to a younger audience. A charter affiliate of Fox and the over-the-air home of Cleveland Cavaliers basketball and Cleveland Browns preseason games, WOIO thrived in competition against the market's established independent WUAB despite ongoing perceptions of being a "video jukebox". When WJW-TV owner New World Communications agreed to affiliate their station group with Fox in 1994, WOIO became the market's CBS affiliate, replacing WJW. Prior to the switch, Malrite took over WUAB via a local marketing agreement and used WUAB's news operation to develop local newscasts for WOIO, which launched in February 1995.

Despite lofty expectations by station management, WOIO's newscasts—rebranded several times and with frequent on- and off-air turnover—remained mired in last place in nearly every timeslot into the 2000s. The station was purchased by Raycom Media in 1998, and veteran executive Bill Applegate was named as WOIO-WUAB's general manager in 2001. Under Applegate, WOIO's news department was relaunched as 19 Action News, featuring a populist-leaning tabloid style with multiple controversial on-air talent hires and rating stunts. While 19 Action News proved successful in some timeslots, Applegate's immediate successors dropped the tabloid motif in 2015 in favor of the more traditional Cleveland 19 News. Following Gray Television's merger with Raycom, WOIO revived some elements of Action News while repositioning their news department for non-linear over-the-top and mobile streaming. In recent years, Gray has added WTCL, expanding WOIO's newscasts to a Spanish-language audience, and Rock Entertainment Sports Network, a joint venture between Gray and Rock Entertainment Group.

== Previous applicants for channel 19 in Cleveland ==
While WOIO's first broadcast occurred on May 19, 1985, channel 19 in Cleveland was one of several ultra high frequency (UHF) allotments created by the Federal Communications Commission (FCC) in 1952 following a complex realignment of future channel allocations, a process that took nearly five years. The combined Cleveland–Akron–Canton market already had three very high frequency (VHF) stations: WNBK, WEWS-TV and WXEL, as well as future UHF outlet WAKR-TV in Akron. Prior to the 1952 allotment table's release, the FCC designated channel 19 as Cleveland's lone UHF allotment, which WGAR, WERE, WHK and WJW—all radio stations that unsuccessfully filed for a VHF license—jointly protested against.

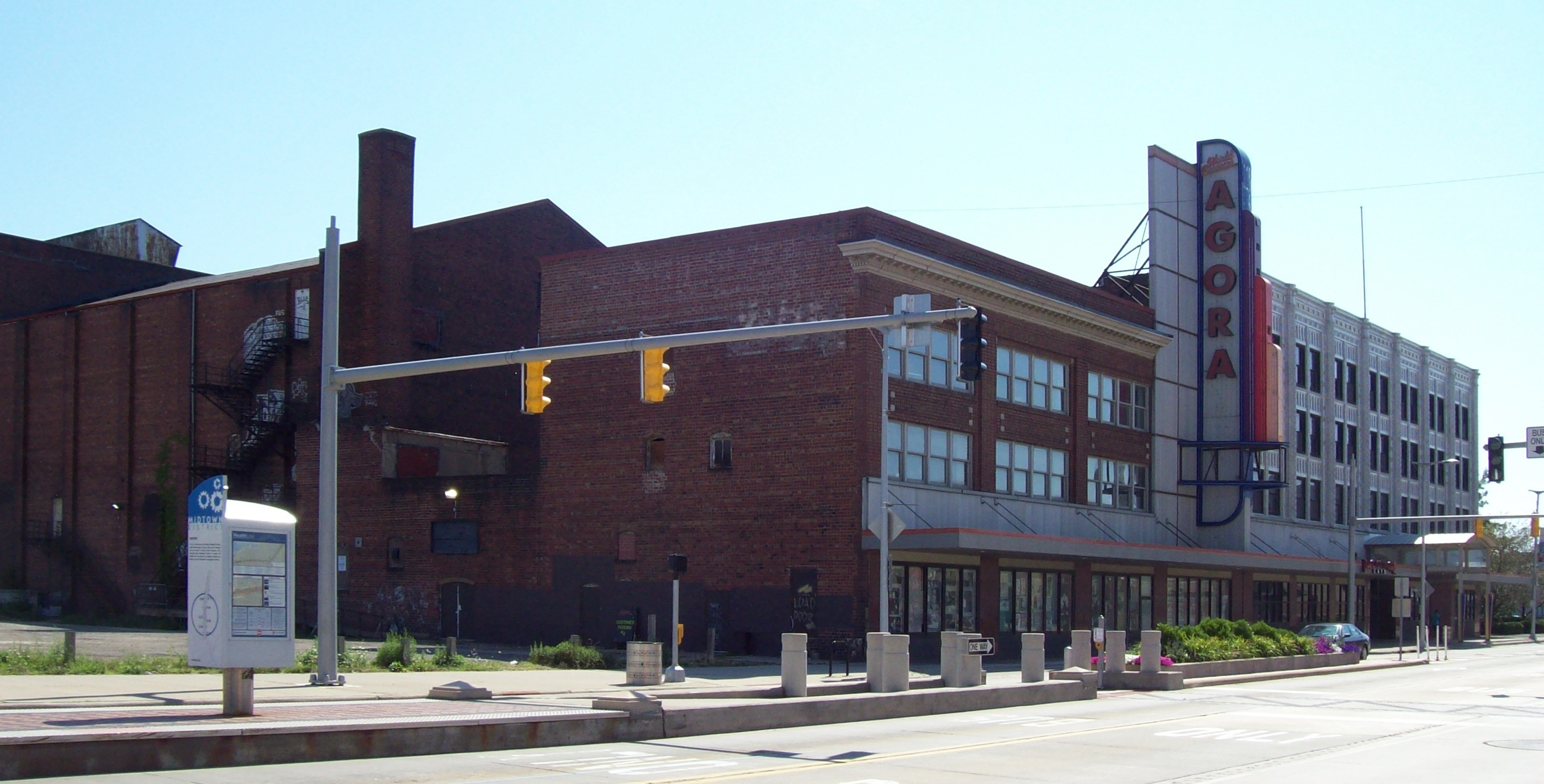
WHK, which held an unbuilt permit for WHK-TV from 1953 to 1960, planned to have studios at the WHK Auditorium, now the Agora Theatre.

WHK owner United Broadcasting Company (the autonomous broadcast arm of the Forest City Publishing Company, parent of The Plain Dealer and the Cleveland News) applied with the FCC to construct a station on channel 19 on May 29, 1951, that would transmit in all-color; station president Harry K. Carpenter called the application a "new era" for WHK, the first commercially licensed radio station in Ohio. WJW also filed a bid for channel 19 but withdrew after determining it would not be economically feasible; WJW owner William O'Neill remarked, "I think I'd rather stay in the radio business and make a little money than go bankrupt with radio and TV". A construction permit was awarded to WHK on December 3, 1953, six months after WERE owner Cleveland Broadcasting was awarded a permit for a station on channel 65. WHK management aimed to sign on WHK-TV from their Euclid Ave. facilities, converted from a movie theater with the intent of housing a TV station, by August 1954. The proposed WHK-TV remained a permit, however, and when WHK and WHK-FM (100.7) were sold to DuMont Broadcasting in 1958, a deadline extension request for WHK-TV necessitated a hearing for the transaction by the FCC. Ultimately unbuilt, the permits for WHK-TV and WERE-TV were two of seven unbuilt UHFs in Ohio, and two of 54 nationwide, that the FCC cancelled on February 19, 1960.

Following the failure of the WHK permit, The Plain Dealer itself filed for an application on July 17, 1962, spurred by passage of the All-Channel Receiver Act, but withdrew their bid by that September, with publisher Thomas V. H. Vail citing the economic uncertainty of UHF. Community Telecasters of Cleveland Inc., led by attorney Charles W. Steadman, was the next to file on April 19, 1963, and was soon being joined by another attempt from Cleveland Broadcasting and WERE. Cleveland Broadcasting was awarded the permit on November 12, 1964, with president Ray T. Miller teasing the idea of their station as the flagship of a 40-station regional UHF network, and WERE host Bill Gordon was considered for a nightly talk show. Construction was delayed after Community Telecasters appealed the permit, which Cleveland Broadcasting eventually gave up in part due to Miller's 1966 death and the eventual sale of the company itself. Community Telecasters was awarded a permit of their own on May 22, 1968, dismissing a competing bid from WIXY-WDOK owner Westchester Corp. While the permit was assigned the call sign WCTF-TV, the construction process stalled with no indication of any potential sign-on date; by comparison, Kaiser Broadcasting signed on WKBF-TV and United Artists signed on WUAB within months of their respective permits being granted. Moreover, both stations were well-financed with existing program inventories whereas Community Telecasters was a local group with limited funds.

Joseph T. Zingale

Joseph T. Zingale, a former partner in Westchester Corp., offered to purchase the channel 19 permit on August 23, 1972, for $300,000 (equivalent to $2.31 million in 2025). Zingale was an investor in several syndicates tied to his cousin Nick Mileti, including the Cleveland Indians, the Cleveland Cavaliers and Cleveland Crusaders, but Zingale said, "...that doesn't necessarily mean anything." He also held ownership stakes in the Richfield Coliseum and WWWE-WWWM parent Ohio Communications, both through Mileti, held a 2.36 percent stake in Westchester's successor, Globetrotter Communications and owned the World TeamTennis franchise Cleveland Nets. United Artists protested the sale, citing these varied ownership interests in multiple professional sports teams, four radio stations and a television station as "a dangerous concentration of power", which Zingale called "a delaying tactic". Retrospectively, Zingale later disclosed he intended on channel 19 being "a sports-oriented station". The FCC rejected United Artists' claims and approved the transfer on October 26, 1973, with Zingale planning to launch the station under the WZIN-TV calls "in about a year". Zingale rescinded the purchase in February 1974 due to a price dispute.

United Artists then offered to purchase the existing WCTF-TV permit for $250,000 (equivalent to $1.5 million in 2025) and concurrently applied to change WUAB's dial position from channel 43 to 19, both on January 7, 1975; WUAB manager Jack Moffitt claimed channel 19 would allow for upgraded reception in neighboring places like Lorain, Ohio, WUAB's city of license. By April, United Artists purchased WKBF-TV's non-license assets from Kaiser, which shut down that station after years of mounting financial losses. Zingale, however, renewed his intentions to secure the permit and filed a protest against the permit sale. An FCC review board refused to extend WCTF-TV's permit deadline in April 1976, effectively taking it away. Community Telecasters then appealed to the United States Court of Appeals in Washington, which upheld the decision in May 1978.

== History ==
=== Application and construction ===
It became obvious to me that I was not going to be vice president of sales for NBC. So I decided that if I wanted professional advancement, I would have to have my own property.

— Hubert B. Payne, former WKYC sales manager and founder of WOIO

The failure to get the WCTF-TV permit built resulted in another bidding process. Cleveland Television Corp. (CTC) filed the initial bid on November 18, 1977; CTC was led by Augustus L. Harper of the Greater Cleveland Growth Organization, along with Aben E. Johnson Jr. and Clifford Beresh, president and sales manager for WXON in Detroit. Zingale told The Plain Dealer four days later, "at the appropriate time, Zingale Broadcasting Co. will file for and aggressively seek Channel 19." WUAB, now owned by Gaylord Broadcasting, also filed a bid, which if granted would result in their existing channel 43 license being returned to the FCC. A third applicant, Channel 19 Inc. was a joint venture of three broadcast groups: Diamond Broadcasting, led by Hubert B. Payne and William Derrick; Malrite Communications executives Milton Maltz, Carl Hirsch and John Wilson; and Metroplex Communications, headed by Norman Wain and Robert Weiss. Malrite purchased WHK and WMMS in 1971, Wain and Weiss had previously been partners with Zingale in Westchester Corp., while Hubert B. Payne was the sales manager for WKYC-TV, the first African-American executive for a local network affiliate.

Hubert B. Payne

All three groups submitted their bids prior to the FCC's deadline of July 6, 1978, but Zingale ultimately declined to file a bid. Citing changes to his personal life and changing conditions in the Cleveland market, Zingale said, "I wish my ex-partners (Wain and Weiss) luck—they'll need it." The structure of the bid had Malrite's Maltz, Hirsch and Wilson directly owning preferred non-voting stock and supplying one-third of the capital equity; voting interest was evenly split between Metroplex and Diamond under an FCC waiver for broadcasters that provided substantial financing for a minority-controlled station. Channel 19 Inc.'s application requested the city of license be assigned to Shaker Heights, a suburb of Cleveland, while Gaylord and CTC requested the station be licensed to Cleveland. An administrative law judge recommended the permit be given to Channel 19 Inc. over CTC on April 12, 1982. The FCC's legal review board upheld the judge's decision on October 15, noting Channel 19 Inc. planned to put all common stock owners in management unlike CTC. After a further round of appeals by CTC, the FCC unanimously awarded the permit and license to Channel 19 Inc. in May 1983. Even as the group still needed to secure a transmitter tower and studios, the station planned to bear the WOIO call sign, standing for "Ohio". Along with Payne becoming the first Black to own and manage a Cleveland television station, it was also the first television station owned by people who were either lifelong residents of the region or, in Payne's words, "adopted the city as their home".

Despite Payne's initial hope of signing on WOIO by February 1984, construction took longer than expected. The Shaker Square shopping center became the group's choice for a studio facility in what became an $11 million investment (equivalent to $35.6 million in 2025) eased by securing $8 million in industrial revenue bonds from Cuyahoga County. During the approval process for the bond, commissioners Tim Hagan and Vincent Campanella raised concerns about the local television market already being crowded, with Campanella citing the challenges WCLQ-TV (channel 61) was now facing. (WCLQ-TV signed on March 3, 1981, initially as a hybrid ad-supported independent and local outlet for subscription television service Preview, but the failure of Preview in 1983 forced WCLQ-TV to operate as a full-time independent.) Industry executives also cited the recent failure of WKBS-TV in Philadelphia as a warning sign for new independent stations. Including all technical aspects and costs to purchase programming, total start-up costs were projected to run higher than $20 million (equivalent to $62 million in 2025). Even with estimates that WOIO could lose between $6–8 million in the first year, Payne vowed to turn a profit in a year. After what amounted to 34 years of multiple failed attempts to build a station on channel 19, WOIO finally took to the air at 7:55 a.m. on May 19, 1985, with an on-air message by Payne and Lakewood native Pat McCormick serving as an "opening day" continuity host; engineers tested the signal hours earlier with an overnight transmission of Dr. Strangelove.

=== Signing on as an independent ===
People say to us, 'Who wants all those old shows?' The answer is: everyone. We're giving them memories. Warm memories.

— Dennis Thatcher, WOIO general manager, on the station's programming philosophy

WOIO signed on as the third independent in the Cleveland market, behind WUAB and WCLQ-TV. To distinguish themselves from both stations, WOIO opted to purchase reruns to longer-established series like I Love Lucy, Happy Days, The Mary Tyler Moore Show and Little House on the Prairie instead of more recent off-network fare and have the lineup consist solely of reruns and movies, a choice aided by the FCC no longer requiring a minimum of locally produced programming. By contrast, WCLQ-TV purchased reruns to multiple recent programs in expensive contracts, including Dallas (which was removed from the schedule after several months) while WUAB purchased rights to Webster, which it dropped after several years but continued to pay for through 1990. WOIO also boasted a technical advancement: it signed on as the first full-time stereo television station in Cleveland, with Malrite's Cincinnati station WXIX-TV converting to all-stereo several weeks later. The station's on-air appearance and script "nineteen" logo were created by Television By Design, an Atlanta–based graphics agency who did similar work for Superstation WTBS. Promos and station identifications were handled by a rotation of announcers including WMMS's Jeff Kinzbach and WMJI's John Webster.

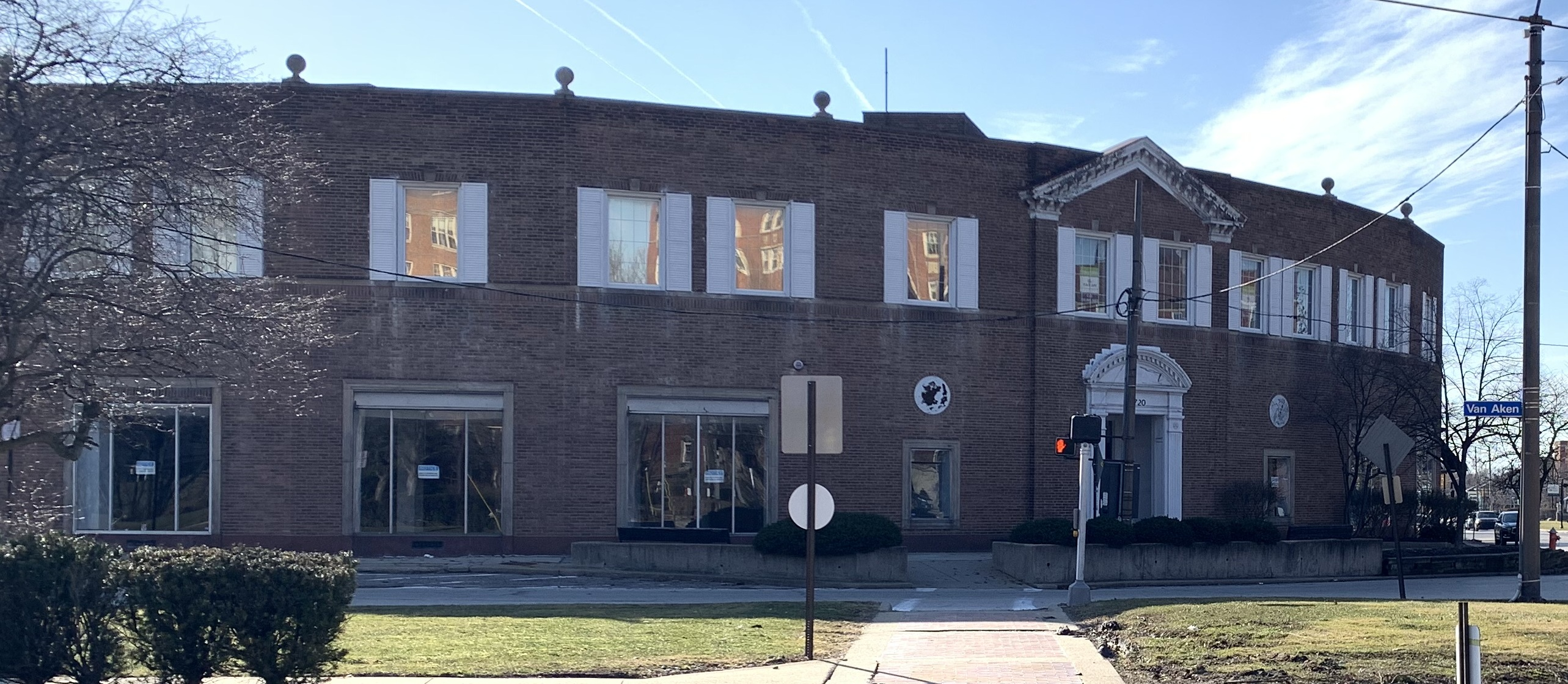
This curved storefront at the Shaker Square shopping center in Shaker Heights served as WOIO's first studio home.

The May 1985 sweeps period saw WOIO immediately making an impact in the market with 6 percent of total viewers, compared to 5 percent for WCLQ-TV and 9 percent for market leader WUAB. This performance was even more shocking as WOIO signed on with only 10 days remaining in the sweeps period, and despite heavy investment into promotions by WCLQ-TV that even included using Ernest P. Worrell (Jim Varney) in promotional spots and billboards. Akron Beacon Journal critic Mark Dawidziak lauded WOIO for having a "clean and sharp" on-air look that suggested care, consideration and significant investment. WBNX-TV, owned by the ministry of televangelist Ernest Angley, came online on December 1, 1985, but positioned itself on family-oriented and religious fare, along with less-expensive older reruns and movies. WOIO's ratings performance continued into the fall of 1985 and spring of 1986, frequently matching or besting WCLQ-TV.

The additional competition had a negative overall effect on ratings and revenue. Despite WOIO's initial ratings success, the station was forced to charge for commercials at rates comparable to basic cable, while the costs for purchasing programming were concurrently driven up for all four stations substantially. WOIO's late entry had also forced them to pay double or triple what WUAB and WCLQ-TV paid for comparable programs. Driven into a financial crunch, Malrite offered to acquire WOIO outright in June 1986—in effect, purchasing the 51 percent controlling stock held by Diamond and Metroplex—as a capital infusion. The deal was legally permissible as the FCC allowed such transactions if it involved a UHF television station in need of financial assistance. Malrite's takeover of WOIO was approved in late November 1986. WCLQ-TV's ownership, itself badly overextended and continuing to lose money with limited chance for profitability, put the station up for sale in January 1986, with HSN parent company Silver King Broadcasting purchasing it in August. A series of lawsuits filed by television production companies drove the outgoing ownership into bankruptcy by year's end with the HSN sale being approved by a bankruptcy court. While WCLQ-TV's ownership publicly objected to Malrite's purchase of WOIO, a legal challenge filed against it was rendered moot due to the Silver King sale. Payne continued to be a major stockholder in both WOIO and Malrite until divesting his shares in 1989.

=== Affiliating with Fox ===
WOIO became a charter affiliate of the Fox Broadcasting Company upon the network's October 9, 1986, launch. While the network was originally limited solely to The Late Show, both Payne and station manager Dennis Thatcher saw the risk (giving up nearly two-thirds of commercial time during the 11 p.m. hour and three-fourths of commercial time on weekends) as worth taking; Thatcher commented, "you give up a lot to get their programming, but we feel like pioneers... it's a long-haul proposition." Fox had previously been mentioned as a potential buyer for WCLQ-TV, while WUAB owner Gaylord Broadcasting declined to affiliate any of their stations with Fox. WCLQ-TV's demise allowed WOIO to pick up the broadcast rights to Cleveland State Vikings college basketball in late 1986. WOIO carried Cleveland Force MISL indoor soccer from 1986 until the team folded in 1988. In 1988, WOIO added Cleveland Cavaliers telecasts, taking over for WUAB. The Cleveland Browns-produced weekly show Browns Insider and Browns NFL preseason games followed in 1989 and 1990, respectively.

WOIO's original logo, used from 1985 until 1995.

Due to Fox's five-year strategy of primetime expansion from 1989 to 1994, WOIO de facto operated as a quasi-independent, programming movies and first-run syndicated shows on nights Fox did not program, leading the Beacon Journal's Bob Dyer to call the station "an odd bird". The station set up a fan club in 1988 for their children's programming, which was folded into the Fox Children's Network upon its 1990 launch. Fox Children's supplanted much of WOIO's syndicated kids fare, programming in the early morning, afternoons and on Saturday mornings. Still, the station was perceived as being little more than a "video jukebox" run out of Shaker Square. While admitting that was the case, Thatcher defended WOIO's success in establishing a strong identity and personality that targeted viewers under the age of 35. The station did feature some locally produced public affairs programming, including a weekly talk show hosted by area attorney Larry Elder. Along with WMMS talent presenting day-long marathons of shows on WOIO, evening host Ric "Rocco" Bennett hosted Buzzard B-Movies on Saturday afternoons.

Fox's success on Thursday nights—led largely by The Simpsons—enabled WOIO to post its highest ratings to date on October 15, 1992, beating WUAB and WKYC outright, and besting WJW-TV and WEWS-TV in several timeslots. WOIO also began matching WUAB in the prime-time "local access" 7 p.m. hour, a time period WUAB traditionally thrived in. WOIO signed a five-year affiliation contract with Fox in October 1993, leading WUAB to align with the United Paramount Network (UPN) nearly a year in advance of their 1995 launch. Fox's successful $1.5 billion bid for NFC broadcast rights in December 1993 (equivalent to $3.34 billion in 2025) prompted WOIO to consider establishing a news department in the spring of 1994. Even with WUAB's established success having 10 p.m. news, one unnamed news director remarked, "they don't have to get ratings, they just have to exist."

Standard & Poor's put $115 million of junk bonds held by Malrite for downgrading in 1992, leaving the company unable to service their growing debt. As a result, Malrite divested their entire radio station unit to Roy E. Disney's Shamrock Broadcasting for $300 million (equivalent to $669 million in 2025) in March 1993. Before that deal was arranged, Maltz and Malrite banker Shearson Lehman Brothers invited other broadcast groups to a possible purchase of WOIO; in August 1992, Sinclair Broadcast Group was rumored to acquire the station for approximately $30 million (equivalent to $68.8 million in 2025). WHK and WMMS were subsequently spun off by Shamrock to now-former Malrite executive Carl Hirsch's OmniAmerica group.

=== Linking up with CBS ===
On May 23, 1994, WJW-TV owner New World Communications signed a group-wide affiliation contract with Fox; calling for stations either owned by New World—or in the process of being acquired by the chain—to switch affiliations to Fox after their existing contracts ended. The news caught CBS president of affiliation relations Tony Malara off guard as such an arrangement was without precedent. Moreover, WJW-TV had been aligned with CBS for 40 years. WOIO not only had their affiliation with Fox recently extended through 1998, their interest in local news was heightened after Malrite encountered success launching a newscast on WXIX-TV, and had the support of Fox president Lucie Salhany. Due to the aftereffects of the early 1990s recession, Fox lessened the priority level for their affiliates to have free-standing news services.

CBS initially courted Scripps-Howard, owner of WEWS-TV and WXYZ-TV in Detroit (another market impacted by the deal) but Scripps-Howard signed an extensive contract of their own between ABC and the majority of their stations. The network next approached WUAB, but details emerged of a possible local marketing agreement (LMA) between WOIO and WUAB, with Malrite assuming operational control of WUAB from owner Cannell Communications; talks between the two owners had been underway for several months.

In what industry observers regarded as a surprise, CBS signed up WOIO as their replacement for WJW-TV, with network executives impressed by Malrite president Milton Maltz's presentation and WOIO's prior loyalty towards Fox. WOIO also committed to carrying Late Show with David Letterman live at 11:30 p.m.—a factor Malara considered "a very big deal", as WJW-TV delayed it until midnight after the New World-produced Valley of the Dolls. The deal came with risks: WOIO had cultivated a strong, youth-oriented identity that needed to be reconciled with CBS's older-skewing programming, while CBS News president Eric Ober noted WOIO's absence of local news resulted in a temporary "news deficit". As part of the affiliation agreement, CBS agreed to provide cash compensation to WOIO for carrying its programming and contributed 50% to a $1 million marketing campaign.

Malrite's LMA with WUAB took effect on August 18, 1994, 16 days before WOIO's affiliation switch to CBS. Operations for both stations were consolidated at Reserve Square in Downtown Cleveland, a process finalized by February 1995, when WOIO's local newscasts launched. WOIO joined CBS on September 3, 1994, with a significant amount of WOIO's syndicated programming moved to WUAB, while WBNX-TV secured the Fox Children's affiliation after WJW-TV declined to pick it up.

=== Raycom ownership ===
"Hometeam 19" logo, 1999–2001.

WOIO primary "CBS 19" logo, 2002–2015.

Montgomery, Alabama–based Raycom Media purchased Malrite Communications on April 6, 1998, for an undisclosed price; the deal also included the LMA with WUAB. The sale was finalized six months later on September 17. Under Raycom ownership, WOIO and WUAB began identifying as "Hometeam 19" and "Hometeam 43" for both newscasts and entertainment programming. Raycom acquired WUAB outright on March 11, 2000, after the FCC relaxed rules allowing common ownership of two commercially licensed television stations in the same market.

In January 2001, Raycom hired controversial broadcast executive Bill Applegate as general manager for WOIO and WUAB, transferring from WMC-TV, Raycom's Memphis station. By 2002, WOIO and WUAB dropped the "Hometeam" branding, with the former becoming "Cleveland's CBS 19" while WUAB became "43 The Block"; newscasts seen on both stations were relaunched and reformatted as 19 Action News. WUAB remained a UPN affiliate until the network's 2006 closure, signing up with MyNetworkTV shortly thereafter. After Applegate's 2014 retirement, WOIO was renamed "Cleveland 19" on August 24, 2015, as part of a large-scale revamp at both stations and their news operation. WUAB similarly rebranded as "CLE 43".

=== Sale to Gray Television ===
On June 25, 2018, Raycom agreed to merge their station group, including WOIO and WUAB, with Atlanta–based Gray Television in a cash-and-stock merger transaction valued at $3.6 billion (equivalent to $4.62 billion in 2025). The sale was completed on January 2, 2019. During the sale process, WUAB became the market's CW affiliate on July 16, 2018, with WUAB's existing MyNetworkTV affiliation moved to a WOIO subchannel.

Gray Television purchased low-power station WLFM-LD (channel 6) on July 29, 2021, for $1.65 million. Several days after the sale was approved by the FCC, Gray announced WLFM-LD would be relaunched as Telemundo affiliate WTCL on January 1, 2022, with evening newscasts in Spanish produced by WOIO. Cleveland had been the largest market in the United States without a Telemundo affiliate. (Since its 2001 purchase by the network, Univision-owned WQHS-DT has only carried remotely-produced news briefs.) As early as 2018, WOIO had produced a daily Spanish-language newscast, Al Día, for their website, social media and OTT services, but this was suspended due to the COVID-19 pandemic; WOIO retained both reporters for Al Día and planned to hire two additional bilingual reporters.

On July 18, 2022, Gray filed a conditional use certificate request with Independence, Ohio, for construction of a two-story studio facility on land overlooking the I-77–I-480 interchange in a proposal titled "Project VO SOT"; WOIO-WUAB-WTCL's current 10-year lease at Reserve Square runs through 2027. Independence City Council approved the request on August 9, 2022, but Gray abandoned the project two years later after failing to get regulatory approval to construct a studio transmitter link tower next to the proposed facility.

== Programming ==
=== Newscasts ===
==== Formation and early struggles ====
From its launch until becoming a CBS affiliate, WOIO had no local news presence. Station founder Hubert B. Payne felt the notion of immediately competing with WKYC, WEWS, WJW-TV and cable news to be "folly on my part". By 1992, Akron Beacon Journal critic Bob Dyer wrote the station had "a gaping hole at its center: no newscast"; in Dyer's analysis, general manager Dennis Thatcher expressed an interest in local news, noting some advertisers—under the impression viewers did not see WOIO as a "real" station—refused to deal with them. Malrite's successful launch of a news service on their Cincinnati station, WXIX-TV, led WOIO management in March 1994 to consider "tiptoe(ing) into local news this fall". As Malrite had been in negotiations with Cannell Communications about a WUAB LMA when the Fox-New World alliance emerged, when WOIO signed with CBS, speculation began about Malrite using WUAB's news department to produce 6 p.m. and 11 p.m. newscasts for WOIO. Thatcher hired former WJW-TV news director Phyllis Quail to oversee the transition process and committed to having local news bulletins during CBS This Morning. The station originally intended to air the CBS Evening News on delay at 7 p.m. with sitcom reruns as a lead-in but ended up running it live at 6:30 p.m.

WOIO kept a low profile assembling its air talent following the affiliation switch, though the station did hire WJW-TV anchor Denise Dufala, WMAQ-TV anchor Emmett Miller, and former Miss America 1989 winner Gretchen Carlson as lead anchors, and WUAB's Jeff Phelps was reassigned as WOIO's lead sportscaster. WUAB's existing team of Jack Marschall, Romona Robinson and Gib Shanley remained exclusive to that station, but reporters and meteorological talent were shared between the two stations. What became known as 19 News launched on February 5, 1995, from a combined facility at Reserve Square under the Cleveland Television News banner; WUAB's newscasts came from a traditional set, but WOIO's newscasts originated from the newsroom with anchors walking to reporters in a style heavily inspired by CITY-TV's CityPulse.

I'm sure someone could shove my nose into a ratings book, rattle off statistics as baffling as DNA evidence and try to explain that Channel 19 really is doing well. But the company still is expending a lot of energy, time and money to achieve what Channel 23 does in a far more Spartan way. And Malrite Communications, which operates Channel 19 and Channel 43, may be killing Channel 43's newscast as well. Now who's crazy?

— R. D. Heldenfels, Akron Beacon Journal

Despite the initial heavy promotion, 19 News struggled to attract viewership, partly due to past impressions of WOIO having been "a second-tier independent" and existing perception of it being "a junior news station". By September 1995, WOIO's 6 p.m. news ranked in last place—tied with WAKC-TV's Akron-centered newscast—while the 11 p.m. news placed third, ahead of WAKC-TV but still significantly behind WKYC and WEWS. Moreover, WJW-TV's 10 p.m. newscast was tied with WUAB and attracted more total viewers than WOIO at 11 p.m. After WAKC-TV's news department was abruptly shut down in February 1996, low-power WAOH-LP (channel 29) and Cleveland simulcast W35AX started carrying WOIO and WUAB's newscasts on an hour delay.

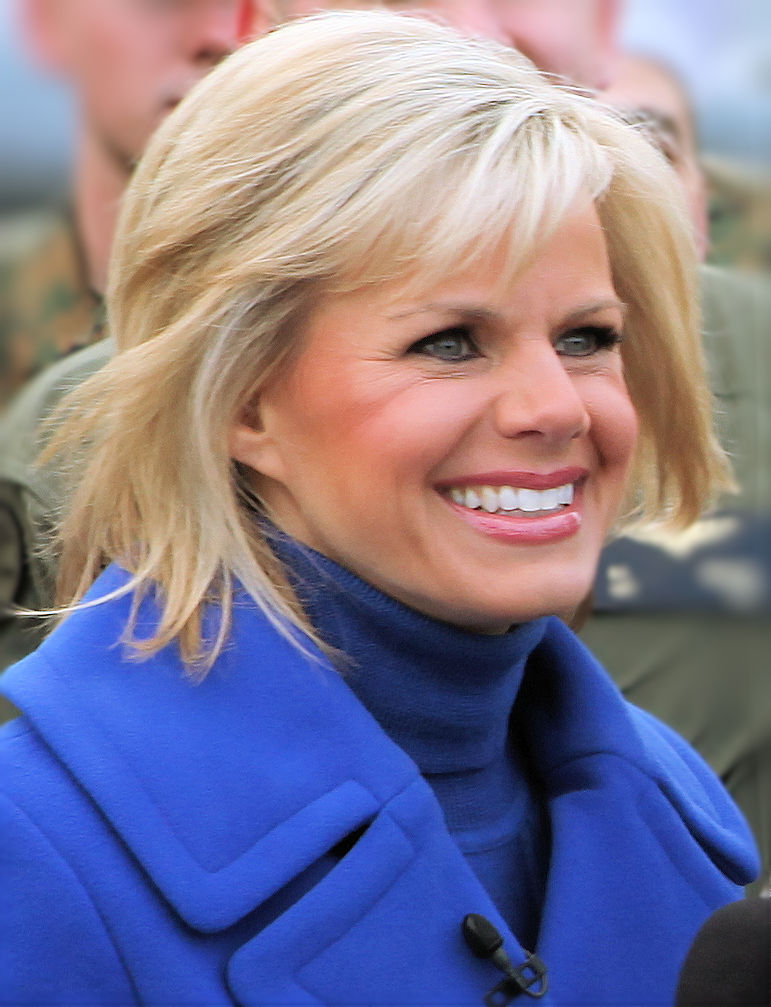
Gretchen Carlson

WOIO rebranded as CBS 19 News in April 1996 in a move Plain Dealer critic Tom Feran regarded as the station "(having) to recover from success" after years of a strong association with Fox. Newly appointed news director Kimberly Godwin-Webb refocused the newscasts to have faster pacing, tighter editing, and consumer-driven segments and de-emphasized what was internally called a "Lazy Susan" anchor desk. Emmitt Miller was demoted from lead anchor to reporter, while Gretchen Carlson took his place as Denise Dufala's co-anchor, the first instance of a two-woman weeknight anchor team in the market. Godwin-Webb likened the station revamping to one CBS was itself undertaking, while general manager Tom Griesdorn noted, "this is not six weeks and out... we're in this for the long run. We're going to be a contender." A surprising addition took place when veteran WJW-TV investigative reporter Tom Meyer joined the station in August 1996, signing a seven-year contract.

The station added both a morning and noon newscast by December 1996; the morning newscast took advantage of a revamped format for CBS This Morning allowing affiliates to produce longer local segments within the national program. WOIO's morning, noon and 6 p.m. newscasts also were simulcast over radio stations WELW in Willoughby and WRKG in Lorain, both beginning in May 1997. The morning news further expanded to a 5:30 a.m. start in October 1997, coupled with an additional 11:30 a.m. newscast on WUAB. Still, viewer loyalty towards well-established competition continued to plague WOIO, with the 6 p.m. news remaining stuck in last place, even ranking behind Roseanne reruns on WUAB and American Journal on WBNX-TV. Carlson was replaced by veteran reporter Kevin Coakley, but noting the heavy competition in the timeslot, Tom Feran mused in his column that WOIO could find possible success moving Seinfeld and Frasier reruns to the 6 p.m. hour, running the CBS Evening News at 7 p.m. and have local news at 7:30 p.m. instead. At the same time, WJW beat WUAB at 10 p.m. by a 2–1 margin during the spring 1998 sweeps period, attributed to the weakness of UPN fare as a lead-in for WUAB along with WOIO's newscasts assuming top priority.

When the channels began their joint operation in 1995, their newscasts looked destined to challenge (the competition) for ratings supremacy, and management wasn't shy about predicting it. ... Channel 19 finished fourth in the ratings that year and still makes camp there six years later. In that same time, anchorwoman Denise Dufala has sat beside four co-anchors, and the meteorologist's face has changed as rapidly as the seasons.

— Thomas Francis, Cleveland Scene, 2001

Raycom's takeover of WOIO and WUAB led to news director Kimberly Godwin-Webb leaving in September 1998, followed by general manager Tom Griesdorn in March 1999. WUAB's 11:30 a.m. newscast was cancelled in December 1998 due to continued low ratings. Kevin Coakley was dismissed in September 1999 and replaced with Jack Marschall, who also retained his existing 10 p.m. duties at WUAB. In early 2000, all newscasts were re-branded as Hometeam 19 News and Hometeam 43 News, based on WUAB's existing "Cleveland's Home Team" slogan. News director Tony Ballew described the two stations as now being "one store with a couple of shelves" instead of the two different entities that had previously been marketed. Behind-the-scenes personnel unionized in 2000 after substantial layoffs (20 staffers from a workforce of 120) and being paid thousands of dollars less than market rate, nearly half as much as competing stations. Raycom and the union struggled to reach a collective bargaining agreement, with Raycom management disclosing during negotiations it overpaid for WOIO and WUAB and was struggling to make a profit.

==== 19 Action News ====
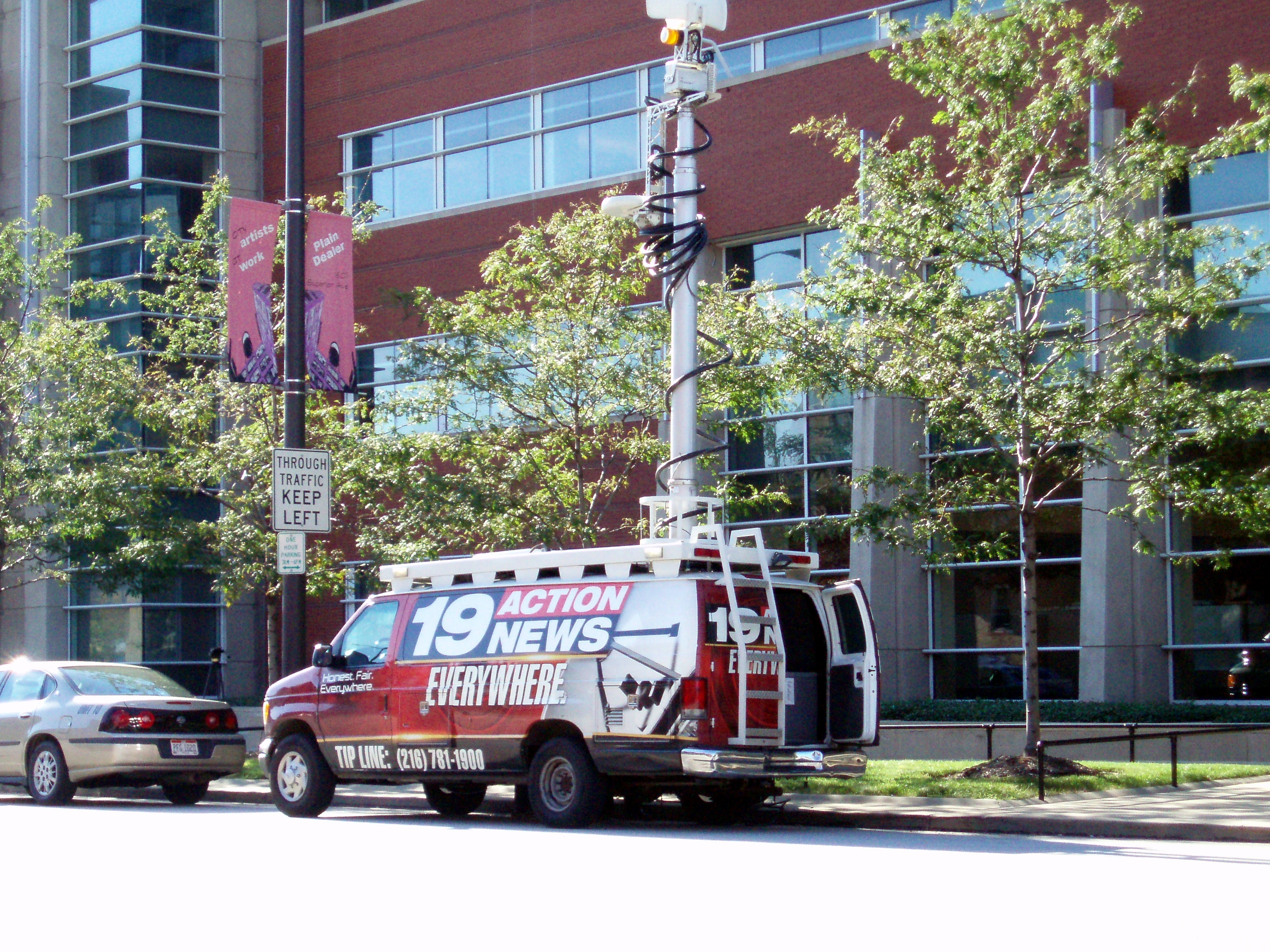
A WOIO electronic news-gathering van (with former 19 Action News signage) in Downtown Cleveland.

In February 2001, Bill Applegate—who had a reputation as a successful, if controversial, executive at WLS-TV, WBBM-TV, KCBS-TV and WABC-TV during the 1980s and 1990s—became WOIO's general manager. Applegate initiated a total overhaul of WOIO and WUAB's newscasts, with the "Hometeam" branding excised outright amid multiple staff departures. David Wittman was hired in January 2002 for a role "not yet been determined" but would "play a major role", fueling speculation of WOIO adopting a tabloid format emphasizing crime and sensationalism but the station asserted would not be akin to "National Enquirer Tonight". As May 2002 began, Wittman took Marschall's place as lead anchor, and all newscasts were relaunched as Action News, featuring a tabloid style. By 2003, the newscast titling was amended to 19 Action News on both stations. News production also increased: a 5 p.m. newscast was added, followed by a 4 p.m. newscast in June 2004.

Applegate's managerial style at WOIO was as aggressive as the format itself. Twice-weekly editorials were instituted, with Applegate frequently critiquing local politicians and groups, years after the practice had fallen out of favor throughout the industry. Chicago media critic Robert Feder retrospectively described him as "bold, brash and wickedly brilliant... willing to try almost anything to draw a crowd". While in Los Angeles—a market dominated by tabloid journalism—Applegate found ratings success at KCBS-TV with saturation coverage of the Lyle and Erik Menendez trial, the 1994 Northridge earthquake and the O. J. Simpson murder case, the latter with Harvey Levin as a dedicated reporter. Applegate viewed 19 Action News as "populist, blue-collar, advocacy", explaining, "your obligation is to tell the truth... I don't think we have an obligation to be objective. We have to tell the truth."

I'm an opportunist at a ratings-challenged station. Everybody makes mistakes. Everybody has issues. She's coming here with a clean slate.

— Leesa Dillon Faust, WOIO news director, on hiring Sharon Reed in 2002 after her firing from WCAU in Philadelphia

Sharon Reed came to WOIO from WCAU in Philadelphia, but her arrival came amid controversy, having previously dated actor Robert De Niro and engaging in an e-mail flame war with WCAU reporter Alicia Taylor, the latter leading to her dismissal from that station. WOIO hired Youngstown anchor Catherine Bosley in 2005, shortly after her dismissal from WKBN-TV when pictures of her participation in a wet T-shirt contest surfaced online, prompting accusations of the station "cashing in" on her notoriety. Sportscaster Chuck Galeti was hired after a 2003 car accident, incarceration and substance abuse rehab, with the station being credited for saving him from "possible career oblivion". WTAM personality Mike Trivisonno began hosting a daily segment with Reed during the 5 p.m. newscast in 2006, with news director Dan Salamone noting Trivisonno was "somebody who was born to be in a 19 Action News format". Veteran investigative reporter Carl Monday joined WOIO in 2007 from WKYC, where a 2006 report on a man committing indecent behavior at a library unintentionally went viral and was parodied by The Daily Show and Deadspin. Tom Meyer, who worked alongside Monday at WJW, left for WKYC shortly thereafter.

(Their) tabloid 'slash-and-burn' style of news reporting is nothing new. It's a classic textbook case of 'Last Place News 101' and an act of desperation. They are in last place because the people of Cleveland and Northeast Ohio have standards—intelligence and integrity. They will not allow themselves to be subjected to WOIO's low-brow, irresponsible acts of self-promotion. Nobody is making any changes in format because of what WOIO is doing.

— Kevin Salyer, WJW vice-president of programming

The ratings performance for 19 Action News ultimately produced mixed results. The 11 p.m. newscast became a priority for WOIO management, with news director Stephen Doerr stating, "we can only win one battle at a time." One 2003 ratings stunt had WOIO airing retrospective pieces on WEWS-TV legends Dorothy Fuldheim, Nev Chandler and Don Webster, prompting that station to accuse WOIO of appropriation. In the February 2004 sweeps, WOIO overtook WEWS-TV to place second at 11 p.m. behind WKYC, although critics noted the showing was possibly influenced by CBS's strong primetime lineup, as all other dayparts—including WUAB's 10 p.m. newscast—remained in last place. Still, comparisons were drawn with that of WSVN in Miami, which found similar success employing a tabloid format. Doerr boasted, "Cleveland is a market that was ready to be awakened ... love it or hate it, it's not to be missed."

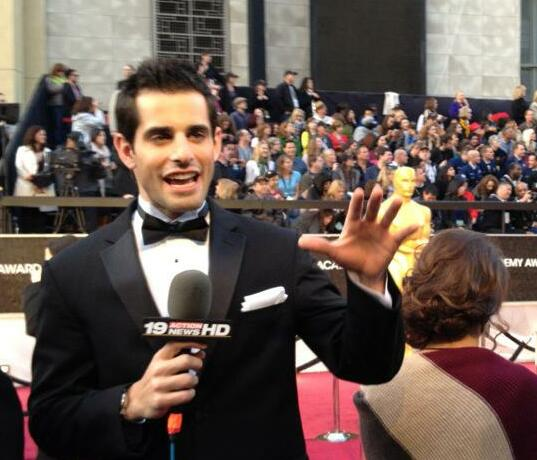
Former entertainment reporter Chris Van Vliet at the 84th Academy Awards.

Reed's participation in Spencer Tunick's large-scale nude photo shoot in downtown Cleveland was profiled by the station during the November 2004 sweeps, proving both a ratings and internet success, with WOIO's website attracting over one million pageviews over a 24-hour period and WOIO earning its highest ratings ever at 11 p.m. None of the station's staffers knew about the story until the week prior, with many newsroom and anchor talent reportedly furious at Applegate, Doerr and Reed; Plain Dealer columnist Connie Schultz assailed management for taking advantage of Reed, "... a beautiful, smart, highly educated black woman in a profession that would never have hired her 30 years ago." WOIO continued placing second at 11 p.m. for several years, and tied WJW for second place at noon by 2006. By 2008, the noon newscast placed second outright, although the 11 p.m. newscast fell back to third place and other newscasts remained largely unchanged.

It's hard to look at the decline in news audience and not think they're bored by the product. Maybe we should put a little vigor back in the news—have something to say instead of being so damned objective all the time.

— Bill Applegate, WOIO general manager

The early 2010s saw WOIO, along with other stations in the market, adapting to changing viewer demands and economic challenges brought on by the 2008 Great Recession. Romona Robinson—who left WUAB in 1997 to join WKYC—joined WOIO in January 2012, arriving as Sharon Reed's contract was not renewed and amid multiple on-air Cleveland talent leaving one station for another or leaving the business altogether. Robinson's hiring came as WOIO drew national attention for depicting the 2012 federal corruption trial of multiple Cuyahoga County officials, including Jimmy Dimora, via puppetry as cameras were prohibited. "The Puppet's Court" segments, with a talking squirrel puppet recapping explicit testimony and the "circus like atmosphere", found coverage in Gawker and Slate. WOIO management assured that Robinson's more traditional style fit with the tone of 19 Action News, with Applegate praising Robinson's years of community involvement and dynamic personality. Robinson saw herself joining the station "...to help reshape the culture and content of the place where my career began" and her on-air persona proved to be a match with the format.

WOIO began shifting towards a more traditional newscast style, although elements of the tabloid format remained, along with WOIO's ability to attain attention-grabbing headlines. During a December 2013 press conference with Browns owner Jimmy Haslam and CEO Joe Banner regarding head coach Rob Chudzinski's dismissal, reporter Dan DeRoos read aloud several posts from the station's Facebook page questioning the firing, then asked, "How do you convince Browns fans that the Three Stooges aren't running this organization?" Applegate announced his retirement on February 11, 2014, effective that April. In a memo to staff, Applegate said his tenure at WOIO-WUAB was "personally rewarding and the highlight of my career" but his departure came after a sales department staffer sued Raycom and Applegate over "creating a sexually hostile work environment".

==== Post–Action News ====
Dominic Mancuso—Applegate's successor as general manager—and news director Fred D'Ambrosi—who joined the station in March 2015—started to overhaul the news department entirely. Former WKYC anchor Mark Nolan, who left that station in 2012 to join WMJI, was hired as Robinson's new co-anchor, replacing David Wittman. Nolan's hiring portended a rebranding to Cleveland 19 News, eschewing the tabloid format and controversy surrounding the Action News name, although Mancuso continued to deliver on-air editorials. Plain Dealer writer Marc Bona poked fun at the on-air appearance changing from a red-and-black color scheme to a blue-and-gold look, saying, "hopefully we won't soon be seeing the scholastic-looking block M on crawlers touting MORE NEWS ... we haven't heard back from the station about whether WOIO will open a bureau in Ann Arbor."

Mancuso left the stations in August 2016, with Erik Schrader replacing him as general manager. Denise Dufala, long seen as the "hometown individual" at WOIO dating back to the news department's creation, retired at the end of 2016, concluding a 30-year career. Several high-profile departures occurred after Raycom announced its merger into Gray Television, including Romona Robinson and Carl Monday.

The digital audience really doesn't have the loyalties that the television audience has. In the digital space, where it's just all about the content, if you can do better content than your competitors, you're going to get traction.

— Brian Sinclair, WOIO assistant news director

After the takeover by Gray, WOIO rebranded as 19 News, returning to a visual style evocative of Action News and slogan of "First. Fair. Everywhere." While the new brand and slogan was a direct nod to Action News, Schrader noted, "we have to stand out. Action News was an effective brand for its time, but time moved on and we had to move on, too. And tastes will change. As much as I like this brand, it probably will eventually change." Newscast production was increased on WOIO and WUAB, with WOIO adding news at 9 a.m. and 3 p.m. in 2019 and 2020, respectively. WOIO has placed an emphasis on over-the-top (OTT) and mobile streaming, with news director Ian Rubin (who replaced D'Ambrosi in 2018) and assistant news director Brian Sinclair recognizing increased audience demand for more local content and different, non-linear options to access it. Rubin also saw WTCL-LD's 2022 launch, coupled with a WOIO-led Spanish-language newscast, as a way for the stations to be more inclusive and diverse in news gathering.

WOIO also produced Cribbs in the CLE: Josh and Maria Live, a daily lifestyle talk show hosted by former Cleveland Brown Josh Cribbs and wife Maria Cribbs, from September 2019 to September 2023; the program was cancelled after WOIO debuted InvestigateTV, a newsmagazine internally syndicated throughout the Gray Television group.

=== Sports programming ===
WOIO was the over-the-air broadcast home for the Cleveland Cavaliers from 1988 to 1994. Assuming the role from WUAB, Joe Tait—the team's longtime radio voice and president of broadcast operations—announced the WOIO telecasts with former Cavalier Jim Chones as color commentator. Veteran Canton sportscaster Jim Johnson was Tait's designated radio backup. CBS sportscaster Greg Gumbel took over for Tait in the 1992–93 season, with Denny Schreiner replacing him the following year. After WOIO joined CBS in 1994, the Cavaliers rights were transferred back to WUAB.

The station's association with the Cleveland Browns began in 1989 when the team began producing a weekly magazine for the station, Browns Insider, hosted by veteran sportscaster Jim Mueller. WOIO secured the local simulcast rights to ESPN Sunday Night Football's Browns–Oilers telecast on December 23, 1989, which was up to that point was the highest-profile broadcast in station history. The Browns signed a multi-year contract with WOIO for preseason games beginning with the 1990 season and lasting through the original team's relocation to Baltimore in 1995.

Browns preseason games returned to WOIO in 2005 via a three-year deal; this also included team-produced NFL draft coverage, training camp reports and a weekly coach's show. Taking over for WKYC—which had carried Browns preseason games since the team's 1999 reactivation—the deal was seen as complementary to WOIO's CBS affiliation and, with it, the network's AFC rights. After WOIO's newscasts covered the drowning of then-team owner Randy Lerner's six-year-old niece, which included a 9-1-1 recording from Lerner's sister Nancy Fisher, the team voided the contract on July 18, 2006; while WOIO was within legal bounds to air the tape (public record under existing Ohio law), the Browns considered it an invasion of the family's privacy. WOIO filed a breach of contract lawsuit against the team, which signed a replacement contract with WKYC several days later.

=== Notable former on-air staff ===
- Harry Boomer, senior reporter and host of 43 Focus
- Kimberly Godwin, news director
- Bob Golic, co-host of Tailgate 19
- Chris Van Vliet, entertainment reporter

== Technical information ==
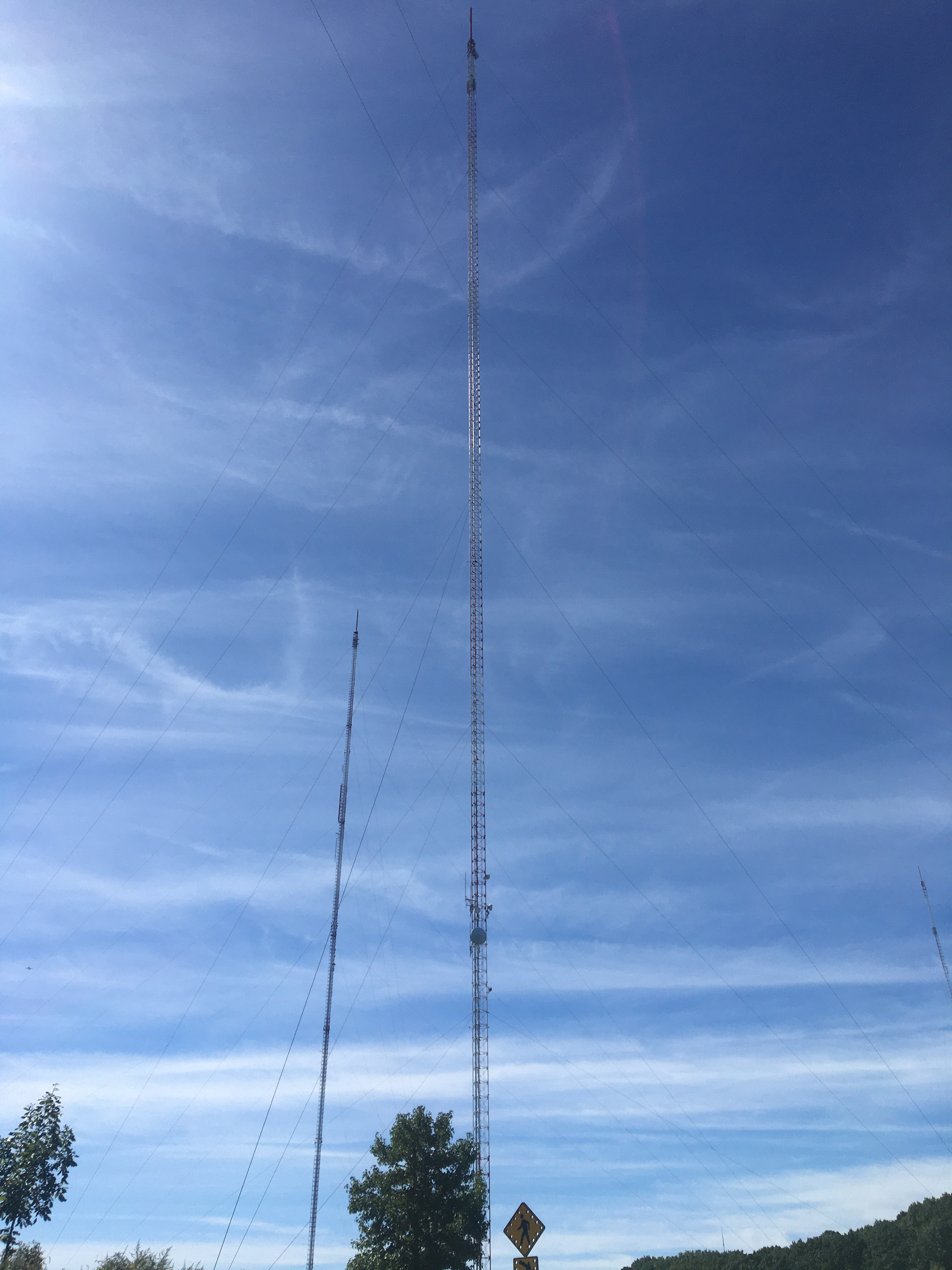
WOIO-WUAB's former transmitter tower (center) at the West Creek Reservation in Parma.

=== Subchannels ===
WOIO and WUAB share a channel and are broadcast from transmitter facilities in Parma.

Subchannels of WOIO and WUAB
| License | Subchannel | Res. | Short name | Programming |
|---|---|---|---|---|
| WOIO | 19.1 | 1080i | WOIO-HD | CBS |
| WOIO | 19.2 | 480i | MeTV | MeTV |
| WOIO | 19.3 | 480i | Defy | Defy |
| WOIO | 19.4 | 480i | The365 | 365BLK |
| WUAB | 43.1 | 720p | WUAB | Main WUAB programming |
| WUAB | 43.2 | 480i | Outlaw | Outlaw |
| WUAB | 43.3 | 480i | Oxygen | Oxygen |

=== Translators ===
WOIO (and, since 2018, WUAB) has operated a digital fill-in translator in Akron on UHF channel 18 since August 12, 2011, to serve that section of the Cleveland–Akron–Canton market. In the immediate Cleveland area, WTCL-LD (channel 6) provides secondary transmissions of WOIO's main program stream on the UHF band, mapped to 19.10. Canton-licensed WOHZ-CD (channel 22) and Akron-licensed W28FG-D are repeaters for WTCL-LD and WOIO in the southern part of the market, also on the UHF band, using the same 19.10 channel numbers.

Translators of WOIO
| Call sign | City of license | Channel | ERP | HAAT | Facility ID | Transmitter coordinates |
|---|---|---|---|---|---|---|
| WOHZ-CD | Canton | 20 | 15 kW | 252.9 m (830 ft) | 41892 | 40°53′24″N 81°16′11″W |
| WTCL-LD | Cleveland | 20 | 15 kW | 306.8 m (1,007 ft) | 6699 | 41°22′45″N 81°43′11″W |
| W28FG-D | Akron | 28 | 15 kW | 245.4 m (805 ft) | 184642 | 41°3′52.7″N 81°34′58.3″W |
| WOIO (DRT) | Akron | 18 | 15 kW | 256.9 m (843 ft) | 39746 | 41°3′52.7″N 81°34′58.3″W |

Grade A signal contours for WOIO and associated translators, repeaters and simulcasts.; WOIO 19.1 Shaker Heights; WOIO (DRT) 19.1 Akron; WTCL-LD 19.10 Cleveland; WOHZ-CD 19.10 Canton; W28FG-D 19.10 Akron

=== Analog-to-digital conversion ===
WOIO ended regular programming on its analog signal, over UHF channel 19, on June 12, 2009, as part of the federally mandated transition from analog to digital television. The station's digital signal continued to broadcast on its pre-transition VHF channel 10. This frequency occasionally creates co-channel interference with CFPL-DT (channel 10) in London, Ontario, during temperature inversion and tropo skip events.

Since January 8, 2018, at 2:01 a.m., WOIO has operated in a channel sharing arrangement with WUAB. This occurred after WUAB sold their over-the-air spectrum in the FCC's spectrum reallocation auction on February 17, 2017, for an undisclosed amount. WUAB was the only station owned by Raycom to participate in the spectrum auction.

Both stations moved to WUAB's former tower in Parma in July 2024 with the installation of a new antenna as part of a larger signal upgrade.
