= WMFD-TV =

Television station in Mansfield, Ohio

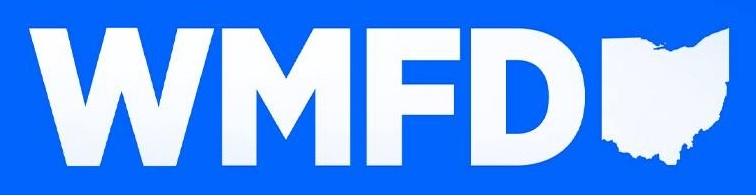

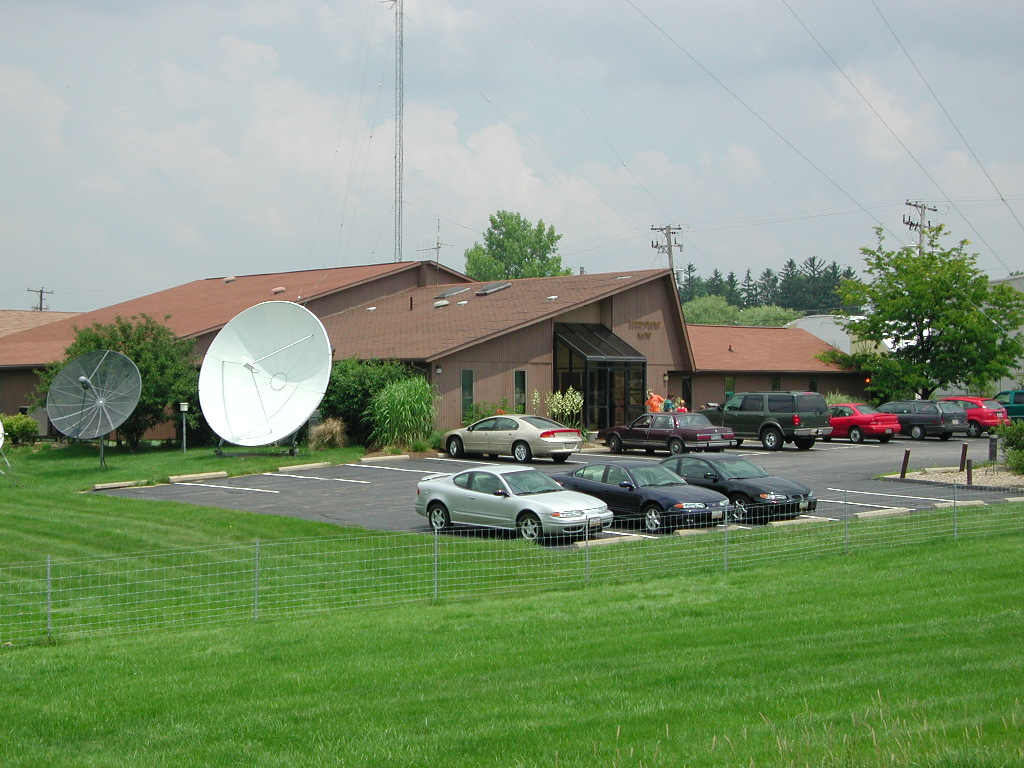
- Mid-State Multimedia Group, Mansfield's only locally owned media outlet, and home base to WMFD-TV, along with sister radio stations WRGM and WVNO-FM.
- Mansfield, Ohio; United States
- Channels: Digital: 12 (VHF); Virtual: 68
- Branding: WMFD Television (general); WMFD NewsWatch HD (newscasts)

Programming
- Affiliations: 68.1: Independent; 68.2: 24-Hour Weather

Ownership
- Owner: Mid-State Television, Inc.
- Sister stations: WVNO-FM, WRGM

History
- First air date: February 29, 1988
- Former call signs: WCEO-TV (1986–1987); WCOM-TV (1987–1989)
- Former channel number: Analog: 68 (UHF, 1986–1989, 1992–2008)
- Former affiliations: Dark (1989–1992)
- Call sign meaning: Mansfield

Technical information
- Licensing authority: FCC
- Facility ID: 41893
- ERP: 14 kW
- HAAT: 180 m (591 ft)
- Transmitter coordinates: 40°45′50″N 82°37′4″W

Links
- Public license information: Public file; LMS
- Website: www.wmfd.com

WMFD-TV (channel 68) is an independent television station in Mansfield, Ohio, United States. It is owned by Mid-State Television, Inc., along with sister radio stations WVNO-FM (106.1) and WRGM (1440 AM/106.7 FM). The stations share studios on Park Avenue West in Ontario, Ohio (with a Mansfield mailing address), where WMFD-TV's transmitter is also located.

WMFD-TV is available on digital cable systems in the north central Ohio area and seen in the Cleveland market via Spectrum cable, DirecTV and Dish Network.

== History ==
The station first signed on the air on February 29, 1988, as WCOM-TV, originally broadcasting on UHF channel 68. The station attempted to enter the Columbus market by construction with a tall transmitter tower (the tallest ever erected in Ohio) south of Mansfield in Butler, but it never achieved cable carriage in the market and shut down in 1989.

Channel 68 returned to the air under the current WMFD-TV call letters on June 1, 1992; this time, targeting viewers in north-central Ohio (the WMFD-TV callsign was previously used on what is now WECT in Wilmington, North Carolina, from that station's sign-on in 1954 until 1958).

== Programming ==
As the only full-power television station specifically serving the Mid-Ohio region, WMFD concentrates on local programming such as Bon Appetit: The Dining Show and Focus on North Central Ohio. The station produces local newscasts, branded as NewsWatch, which air Monday through Friday. WMFD also airs Mid-Ohio area high school football and basketball games. Outside of local programs, the station fills out the remainder of its schedule with syndicated programming and infomercials.

== Technical information ==
Website logo

=== Subchannels ===
The station's signal is multiplexed:

Subchannels of WMFD-TV
Subchannel	Res.	Short name	Programming
68.1	1080i	WMFD-DT	Main WMFD-TV programming
68.2	480i	WMFD-DT	24-Hour Weather

=== Analog-to-digital conversion ===
WMFD-TV signed on its digital signal on VHF channel 12 in 1998, claiming to be the first independent station in the United States to begin digital television broadcasts. The station shut down its analog signal, over UHF channel 68, on June 16, 2008. The station's digital signal continued to broadcast on its pre-transition VHF channel 12, using virtual channel 68.
