= WVNO-FM =

Radio station in Mansfield, Ohio

- Mansfield, Ohio; United States
- Broadcast area: Mid-Ohio
- Frequency: 106.1 MHz (HD Radio)
- Branding: Mix 106

Programming
- Format: Adult contemporary
- Subchannels: HD2: Country; HD3: Contemporary Christian
- Affiliations: Premiere Networks; Westwood One

Ownership
- Owner: Johnny Appleseed Broadcasting Company
- Sister stations: WMFD-TV; WRGM

History
- First air date: August 11, 1962
- Call sign meaning: Voice of Northern Ohio

Technical information
- Licensing authority: FCC
- Facility ID: 31855
- Class: B
- ERP: 40,000 watts
- HAAT: 166 meters (545 ft)
- Transmitter coordinates: 40°45′50.00″N 82°37′4.00″W
- Translators: HD2: 97.3 W247BL (Mansfield); HD3: 99.3 W257CV (Butler)

Links
- Public license information: Public file; LMS
- Webcast: Listen live
- Website: wvno.com

WVNO-FM (106.1 FM) is a radio station broadcasting an adult contemporary format. Licensed to Mansfield, Ohio, United States, the station serves the Mid-Ohio area. The station is currently owned by Johnny Appleseed Broadcasting Company and features extensive local programming. WVNO-FM is locally owned, operated, and programmed locally.

== HD/LPFM ==
On August 20, 2018, WVNO launched a country music format on its HD2 subchannel, branded as "97.3 The Spur" (simulcast on translator W247BL 97.3 FM Mansfield).

Sometime later, WNVO launched a Christian contemporary station on their HD3 subchannel branded as "99.3 The Light" (simulcast on translator W257CV 99.3 FM licensed to Butler).
