= WRGM =

- Ontario, Ohio; United States
- Broadcast area: Mid-Ohio
- Frequency: 1440 kHz
- Branding: ESPN Radio 106.7 FM

Programming
- Format: Sports
- Affiliations: ESPN Radio

Ownership
- Owner: GSM Media Corporation
- Sister stations: WMFD-TV; WVNO-FM

History
- First air date: July 17, 1987

Technical information
- Licensing authority: FCC
- Facility ID: 25476
- Class: D
- Power: 1,000 watts (day); 28 watts (night)
- Transmitter coordinates: 40°46′5.00″N 82°37′4.00″W
- Translator: 106.7 W294CK (Mansfield)

Links
- Public license information: Public file; LMS
- Website: wrgm.com

WRGM (1440 AM) is a radio station broadcasting a sports format. Licensed to Ontario, Ohio, United States, the station serves the Mid-Ohio area. The station is currently owned by Gsm Media Corporation and features programming from ESPN Radio, the Cleveland Browns and the Columbus Crew.

== FM translator ==
WRGM's programming is simulcast 24 hours on FM translator W294CK on 106.7FM, in order to widen the broadcast area of 1440 kHz, especially during nighttime hours when the AM broadcasts with only 28 watts.

On August 20, 2018 WRGM switched its FM translator from W247BL 97.3 FM (which switched to a country format, simulcasting WVNO-FMHD3) to W294CK 106.7 FM Mansfield.

Broadcast translator for WRGM
Call sign	Frequency	City of license	FID	ERP (W)	HAAT	Class	FCC info
W294CK	106.7 FM	Mansfield, Ohio	200334	250	0 m (0 ft)	D	LMS

== Previous logo ==
(WRGM's logo under previous 97.3 translator)
