= WDEM-CD =

Television station in Columbus, Ohio

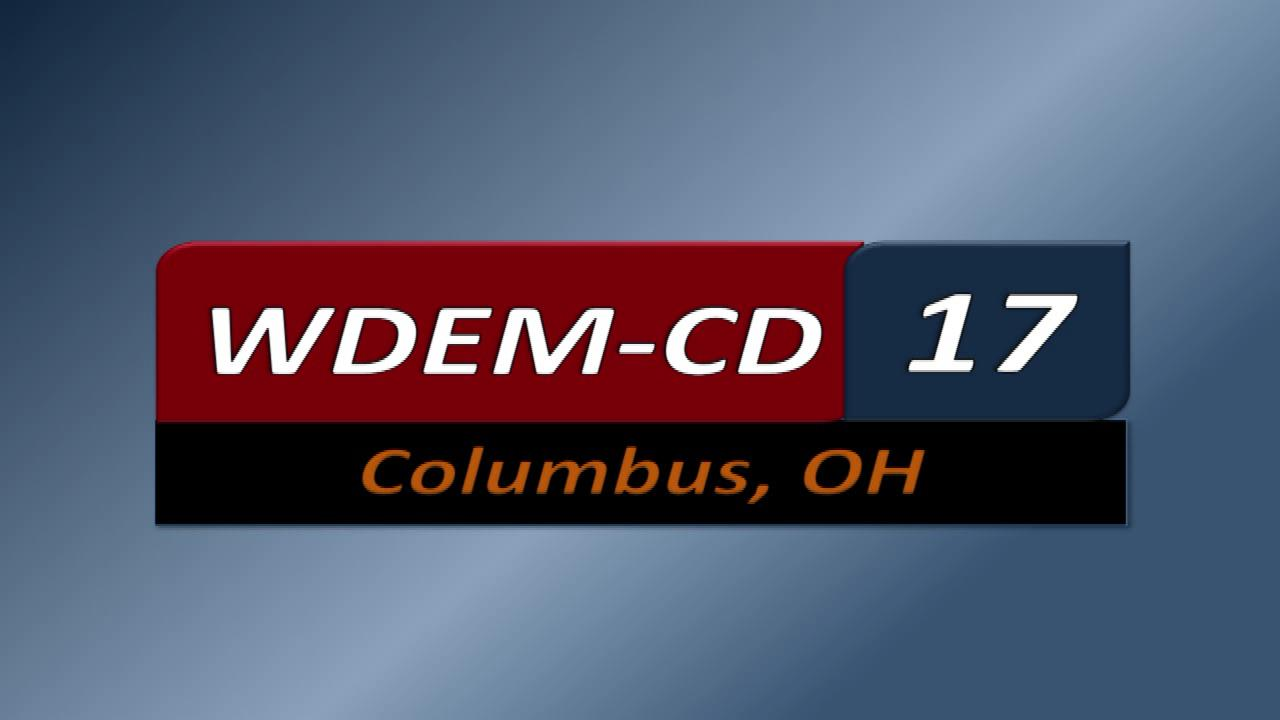
- HC2 default slide
- Columbus, Ohio; United States
- Channels: Digital: 24 (UHF); Virtual: 17

Programming
- Affiliations: see § Subchannels

Ownership
- Owner: Innovate Corp.; (HC2 Station Group, Inc.)

History
- Founded: January 8, 1986
- First air date: August 31, 1987
- Former call signs: W17AI (1986–1998); WDEM-LP (1998–2008); WDEM-CA (2008–2009)
- Former channel numbers: Analog: 17 (UHF, 1988–2009); Digital: 17 (UHF, 2009–2019)
- Former affiliations: Independent (via WWAT-TV, 1987–1992); HSN (1992–1998, 2007–February 2009); America's Store (1998–2007); Local programming (February–July 2009); Universal Sports (July 2009–2011); Silent (2011–2013); Telemundo (2013–2019); Azteca América (2019–2022); Estrella TV (2023–2024); Infomercials (2024)

Technical information
- Licensing authority: FCC
- Facility ID: 54414
- Class: CD
- ERP: 15 kW
- HAAT: 219.6 m (720 ft)
- Transmitter coordinates: 39°58′14″N 83°1′16″W

Links
- Public license information: Public file; LMS

WDEM-CD (channel 17) is a low-power, Class A television station in Columbus, Ohio, United States. The station is owned by Innovate Corp. and mostly broadcasts subchannels featuring infomercials and diginets. Since December 2024, its primary channel has served as the Columbus affiliate for the Rock Entertainment Sports Network.

== History ==
W17AI began broadcasting in 1987. It was owned by Regional Broadcasting Corporation, owned by Gary and Susan Clarke; beginning in 1988, it primarily served to rebroadcast WWAT-TV in Chillicothe. At the time, WWAT-TV had been removed from all three of the cable systems in the Columbus area. This was a change from Clarke's original plan for programming W17AI after he purchased the permit from the LaMarca Group of New York City the year before; he had originally intended on programming oriented to the large campus audience at Ohio State University. The Clarkes sold the station in August 1989 to WWAT-TV owner Wendell A. Triplett. In 1991, W17AI split from WWAT-TV to broadcast the Home Shopping Network. The call sign was changed to WDEM-LP in 1998.

In early 2009, the station—still owned by Triplett—changed its programming from home shopping to an arts and culture format known as "Lifeline Columbus" under the leadership of David Chesnet. The station had previously become a Class A station in December 2008, changing call signs from WDEM-CA to WDEM-CD. The station also converted to digital in 2009 and added a subchannel airing Telemundo in 2010. Subchannels aired in the 2010s included Universal Sports and Justice Network (now True Crime Network). Minority Brands, owned by Richard Schilg, acquired WDEM-CD from Triplett for $75,000 in 2014.

On April 3, 2019, HC2 Holdings closed on its acquisition of WDEM from Minority Brands, Inc., for $866,000. The station then moved from channel 17 to channel 24 as part of the repack, with Telemundo replaced by HC2-owned Azteca América.

Since December 4, 2024, WDEM's primary channel has carried programming from Gray Media's Rock Entertainment Sports Network.

== Subchannels ==
The station's digital signal is multiplexed:

Subchannels of WDEM-CD
Subchannel	Res.	Short name	Programming
17.1	720p	WDEM-CD	Rock Entertainment Sports Network
17.2	480i	WDEM-CD	MovieSphere Gold
17.3	480i	WDEM-CD	Black Vision TV
17.4	480i	WDEM-CD	365BLK
17.5	480i	WDEM-CD	Defy
17.6	480i	WDEM-CD	Outlaw
17.7	480i	WDEM-CD	NTD America
17.8	480i	WDEM-CD	Hasbro Legends
17.9	480i	WDEM-CD	Infomercials (4:3)
17.10	480i	WDEM-CD	Oxygen
17.11	480i	WDEM-CD	NBC True CRMZ
