= WTCL-LD =

Television station in Cleveland

- Cleveland, Ohio; United States
- Channels: Digital: 20 (UHF); Virtual: 6, 19, 22
- Branding: Telemundo Cleveland

Programming
- Affiliations: 6.1: Telemundo; 19.10: CBS; 22.1: RESN

Ownership
- Owner: Gray Media; (Gray Television Licensee, LLC)
- Sister stations: WOIO, WUAB, WOHZ-CD

History
- First air date: November 30, 1989
- Former call signs: W47BE (1989–1998); W65DL (1998–2000); WXOX-LP (2000–2012); WLFM-LP (2012–2020); WLFM-LD (2020–2021); WTCL-LP (2021–2022)
- Former channel number: Analog: 47 (UHF, 1989–1998), 65 (UHF, 1998–2012), 6 (VHF, 2012–2020)
- Former affiliations: HSN (2002–2009); Dark (2009–2012); Audio-only independent (2012–2020); JTV (2020–2021)
- Call sign meaning: "Telemundo Cleveland"

Technical information
- Licensing authority: FCC
- Facility ID: 6699
- Class: LD
- ERP: 15 kW
- HAAT: 306.8 m (1,007 ft)
- Transmitter coordinates: 41°22′45″N 81°43′11″W

Links
- Public license information: LMS
- Website: telemundocleveland.com

WTCL-LD (channel 6) is a low-power television station in Cleveland, Ohio, United States, affiliated with Telemundo. It is owned by Gray Media alongside CBS affiliate WOIO (channel 19), WUAB (channel 43), an independent station with MyNetworkTV, and WOHZ-CD (channel 22); WTCL and WOHZ also function as ultra high frequency (UHF) repeaters for WOIO. All four stations have studios at Reserve Square in downtown Cleveland; WTCL-LD's transmitter is located in suburban Parma. WTCL's visibility is extended to the southern part of the Cleveland market via repeaters WOHZ and W28FG-D in Akron; WOHZ is additionally relayed over WTCL.

Founded as a mostly obscure low-power station in the Cleveland area on UHF channels 47 and 65, this station moved to channel 6 in 2012 after several failed attempts to convert the station for digital broadcasting, enabling it to operate as WLFM-LP, a de facto radio station on 87.7 FM. After briefly carrying a hybrid modern rock/talk format, a lease to TSJ Media resulted in the installation of a Spanish language radio format as "La Mega 87.7", the first such format to operate on a full-time basis in the market. Increasing technical complications and limitations forced WLFM-LP to convert to digital in July 2020. A sale to Gray Television the following year saw the station relaunched as the market's first Telemundo affiliate.

== History ==
=== Early history and attempted digital conversion ===
This station signed on as a low-power station on channel 47 on November 30, 1989, using the sequentially assigned W47BE call sign. Moving to channel 65 (which had been previously reserved for commercial UHF broadcasts in the early 1950s which were never built) on April 15, 1998, the calls were changed to W65DL, then adopted the WXOX-LP calls on January 12, 2000. In the final years as WXOX, the station was affiliated with the Home Shopping Network (HSN).

WXOX-LP filed paperwork requesting the station move to channel 44 and increase power to 120 kW, but amended the request for digital conversion. Federal Communications Commission (FCC) findings stated channel 44 would cause interference with adjacent WNEO, prompting WXOX-LP to request broadcasting over a subchannel of WCDN-LP. WXOX-LP was then forced off the air on October 27, 2009, when wireless carrier Verizon purchased the part of the wireless spectrum where the station had been broadcasting. An attempt was made to convert WXOX to a low-power digital station on channel 31, which WJW broadcast from prior to the June 12, 2009, analog shutoff date. Due to potential co-channel interference issues with CITY-DT-2 in Woodstock, Ontario, which also broadcast on RF channel 31, the application was abandoned.

=== As a "Franken-FM" radio station ===
==== 87.7 Cleveland's Sound ====
In May 2011, the station's then-owner, Venture Technologies Group, filed a new FCC request to move the station to channel 6 analog, leading to speculation that it could carry the audio feed of an FM radio station due to analog transmissions on that frequency also being audible over 87.7 FM. After entering into an operating agreement with Murray Hill Broadcasting—headed by former WWWE, WRMR and WDOK co-owner Tom Wilson and aligned with Venture executive Paul Koplin—Wilson announced the launch of a personality-driven alternative rock/talk format, using the WLFM-LP call sign which Venture transferred from their low-power channel 6 station in Chicago.

With studios located within the Cleveland Agora, what became known as "87.7 Cleveland's Sound" was originally scheduled to launch in July 2012, but did not debut until September 9, 2012. WLFM-LP aired a taped loop of Cleveland-themed sports songs and "My Town" as a prolonged stunt, while the TV signal displayed either a loop of slides of local landmarks, or a screensaver for Western Digital. A casting call was conducted for possible air talent, with former WKRK-FM host Rachel Steele named as afternoon host and former WFBQ program director Marty Bender assuming like duties. Former WMMS personalities Dan Stansbury and Chad Zumock were later added to the airstaff.

Readers of Cleveland Scene awarded WLFM-LP as "Best Local Radio Station" in 2013. The station also featured area local music show Inner Sanctum but the program was cancelled in September 2013; host Pat Johnson said the station "was hoping for a big summer and that hasn't translated into sales yet".

==== La Mega 87.7 ====
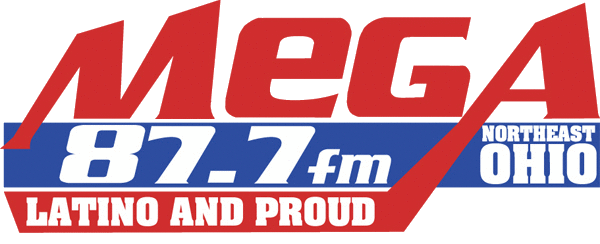
Logo as "La Mega 87.7", playing off of the station's aural transmissions being audible at 87.7 FM.

Murray Hill Broadcasting announced a local marketing agreement (LMA) with Cincinnati-based TSJ Media on December 11, 2013, effectively changing WLFM-LP to a Spanish language radio format, de facto becoming the first full-time Hispanic radio station in Cleveland proper. Tom Wilson viewed Murray Hill's LMA with TSJ Media as "a significant upgrade of an opportunity... sometimes you just don't realize what opportunity is there until somebody presents it to you. It's really the way to go". When the LMA took effect on January 1, 2014, WLFM-LP was renamed "La Mega 87.7: Latino and Proud", boasting an airstaff that included several area disc jockeys. TSJ Media would later be acquired by Columbus-based La Mega Media, Inc., on April 16, 2019.

Beginning with the 2014–15 NBA season, WLFM-LP carried Spanish-language broadcasts of the Cleveland Cavaliers, then added Spanish-language broadcasts of the Cleveland Browns in 2018; Rafael Hernandez Brito served as play-by-play announcer for both teams.

=== Conversion to digital ===
WLFM-LP suspended operations on February 26, 2019, when WOUC-TV in Cambridge, Ohio, moved to RF channel 6 during the repacking of broadcast spectrum initiated by the FCC's 2016 auction; WLFM-LP returned to the air several days later with a power reduction to 3 watts. While low-power television stations operating as "Franken-FMs", including WLFM-LP, had deadlines for digital conversion extended multiple times by the FCC, the spectrum repack forced the station to convert to digital broadcasting on RF channel 20. Thus, WLFM-LP discontinued analog broadcasting on June 30, 2020, with the "La Mega 87.7" format moved to an internet-only platform.

On July 29, 2020, the renamed WLFM-LD launched, carrying Jewelry Television as a temporary affiliation.

=== Sale to Gray and Telemundo affiliation ===
Murray Hill Broadcasting sold WLFM-LD to WOIO and WUAB owner Gray Television on July 29, 2021, for $1.65 million, which the FCC approved on September 13. Shortly thereafter, Gray announced WLFM-LD would adopt the WTCL call sign and join Telemundo on January 1, 2022; prior to this, Cleveland was the largest market in the United States not to have a dedicated Telemundo affiliate. The new station would also have evening newscasts in Spanish produced by WOIO, the first such newscasts to be broadcast in the Cleveland market, as Univision-owned WQHS-DT only carries remotely-produced news briefs. WOIO previously produced a daily Spanish-language newscast, Al Día, for their website, social media and OTT services, but was suspended due to the COVID-19 pandemic; WOIO retained both Al Día reporters and planned to hire two additional bilingual reporters.

WLFM-LD was renamed WTCL-LP on October 15, 2021, and adopted the -LD suffix on August 5, 2022.

== Technical information and subchannels ==
WTCL-LD transmits from a tower in Parma, Ohio. WTCL's reach is extended by two translators: WOHZ-CD, licensed to Canton, Ohio, which transmits from a tower in northeast Canton; and low-power W28FG-D, licensed to Akron, Ohio, which transmits from a tower in Copley Township, Ohio. All three stations carry the same multiplexed signal:

Subchannels of WTCL-LD, WOHZ-CD, and W28FG-D
| Subchannel | Res. | Short name | Programming |
|---|---|---|---|
| 6.1 | 1080i | TLMD | Telemundo |
| 19.10 | 480i | WOIOHD | CBS (WOIO simulcast) |
| 22.1 | 720p | RESN | Rock Entertainment Sports Network |

Simulcast of subchannels of another station

=== Translators ===
Translators of WTCL-LD
| Call sign | City of license | Channel | ERP | HAAT | Facility ID | Transmitter coordinates |
|---|---|---|---|---|---|---|
| WOHZ-CD | Canton | 20 | 15 kW | 252.9 m (830 ft) | 41892 | 40°53′24″N 81°16′11″W |
| W28FG-D | Akron | 28 | 15 kW | 245.4 m (805 ft) | 184642 | 41°3′52.7″N 81°34′58.3″W |

Grade A signal contours for WTCL-LD, WOHZ-CD and translator W28FG-D.; WTCL-LD; WOHZ-CD; W28FG-D
