= Huntington Bank Field =

Stadium in Cleveland, Ohio

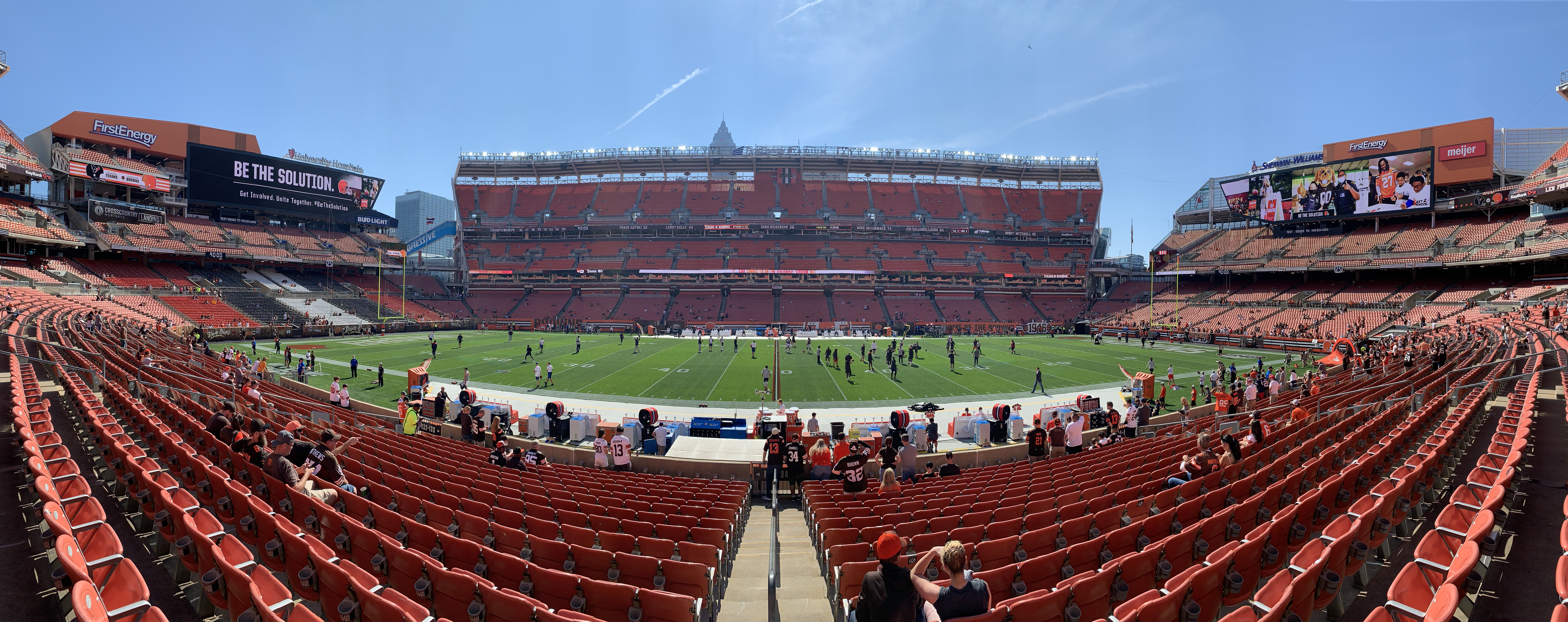
- Interior view, 2021

- Location in Cleveland Location in Ohio Location in the United States
- Former names: Cleveland Browns Stadium (1999–2013, 2023–2024); FirstEnergy Stadium (2013–2023)
- Address: 100 Alfred Lerner Way
- Location: Cleveland, Ohio, U.S.
- Coordinates: 41°30′22″N 81°41′58″W
- Owner: City of Cleveland
- Operator: Cleveland Browns
- Capacity: 67,431
- Executive suites: 143
- Surface: Kentucky bluegrass
- Record attendance: 73,718 (November 3, 2002 vs. Steelers)
- Public transit: West 3rd

Construction
- Groundbreaking: May 15, 1997
- Opened: September 12, 1999
- Cost: $283 million ($547 million in 2025)
- Architects: HOK Sport; Robert P. Madison International, Inc. Ralph Tyler Companies
- Project manager: The Project Group
- Structural engineer: Osborn Engineering
- Services engineer: URS Corporation
- General contractor: Huber, Hunt & Nichols

Tenant
- Cleveland Browns (NFL) 1999–present

Website
- huntingtonbankfield.com

Huntington Bank Field is a stadium in Cleveland, Ohio, United States. It is the home field of the Cleveland Browns of the National Football League (NFL), and serves as a venue for other events such as college and high school football, soccer, hockey, and concerts. It opened in 1999 as Cleveland Browns Stadium and was known as FirstEnergy Stadium from 2013 to 2023 before briefly reverting to its original name until 2024. The initial seating capacity was listed at 73,200 people, but following the first phase of a two-year renovation project in 2014, was reduced to the current capacity of 67,431. The stadium sits on 31 acres (13 ha) of land between Lake Erie and the Cleveland Memorial Shoreway in the North Coast Harbor area of downtown Cleveland, adjacent to the Great Lakes Science Center and Rock and Roll Hall of Fame. Cleveland Stadium stood on the site from 1931 to 1996.

== History ==
Huntington Bank Field is located on the site of Cleveland Stadium, commonly called Cleveland Municipal Stadium, a multipurpose facility built in 1931 that served as the Browns' home field from their inception in 1946 through the 1995 season. During the 1995 season, owner Art Modell announced his plans to move the team to Baltimore, which resulted in legal action from the city of Cleveland and Browns season ticket holders. The day after the announcement was made, voters in Cuyahoga County approved an extension of the original 1990 sin tax on alcohol and tobacco products to fund renovations to Cleveland Stadium. Eventually, as part of the agreement between Modell, the city of Cleveland, and the NFL, the city agreed to tear down Cleveland Stadium and build a new stadium on the same site using the sin tax funds. Modell agreed to leave the Browns name, colors, and history in Cleveland and create a new identity for his franchise, eventually becoming the Baltimore Ravens, while the NFL agreed to reactivate the Browns by 1999 through expansion or relocation of another team. Demolition on the old stadium began in November 1996 and was completed in early 1997. Debris from the former stadium was submerged in Lake Erie and now serves as an artificial reef.

Ground was broken for the new stadium on May 15, 1997, and it opened in July 1999. The first event was a preseason game between the Browns and the Minnesota Vikings on August 21, followed the next week by a preseason game against the Chicago Bears. The first regular-season Browns game at the stadium was played the evening of September 12, 1999, a 43–0 loss to the Pittsburgh Steelers.

In 2011, local comedian and Browns fan Mike Polk referred to the stadium as the "factory of sadness" in a video recorded outside the stadium in which he complains about the team's futility. In 2021, after the Browns defeated the Steelers in the 2020–21 playoffs, local TV station WKYC broadcast a segment with Polk where he "closed" the "factory of sadness".

Through the 2025 season, Huntington Bank Field is the only NFL venue that has yet to host a postseason game of any kind. The Browns are one of five teams who have yet to host a home playoff game in their current stadium, along with the Atlanta Falcons, Las Vegas Raiders, Los Angeles Chargers, and New York Jets. Those facilities, however, have each hosted the Super Bowl, while the Jets' home, MetLife Stadium, and the Chargers' home, SoFi Stadium, have also hosted home playoff games for their other tenants, the New York Giants and Los Angeles Rams, respectively.

=== New Huntington Bank Field ===
The Browns' lease at the stadium is set to expire at the end of the 2028 season. Cleveland mayor Justin Bibb and the Browns announced in October 2024 that the team plans to construct a new indoor stadium in suburban Brook Park, at a site adjacent to Cleveland Hopkins International Airport, in time for the 2029 season. The current naming rights deal specifies that the Huntington Bank Field name will be transferred to the new facility once it opens. The city of Cleveland objected to the project, saying such a move would violate Ohio's Modell Law, which is designed to prevent franchises from leaving publicly funded facilities. In response, the team sued the city in October 2024 for clarification on the Modell Law, and the city countersued in January 2025 to enforce the Modell Law. Dennis Kucinich, who served as mayor of Cleveland in the late 1970s and was one of the main authors of the Modell Law when he served in the Ohio Senate, filed a lawsuit in late August 2025 against the Browns on behalf of taxpayers for enforcement of the Modell Law. Public funding for the new stadium was approved by the Ohio legislature on June 30, 2025, and the Ohio Department of Transportation approved the construction permit for the facility on September 18, after it was found that it would not interfere with the airport. The Browns and the city of Cleveland announced an agreement on October 13 that calls for the team to pay the city $100 million, including the costs for demolition of the current stadium, and the Browns will have options to extend the lease through the 2029 and 2030 seasons if the new stadium is not completed in time. The city agreed to drop all lawsuits related to the move and cooperate with the new stadium development including infrastructure improvements around the airport. The team officially broke ground for the project on March 2, 2026, with a ceremonial groundbreaking on April 30.

== Facility ==
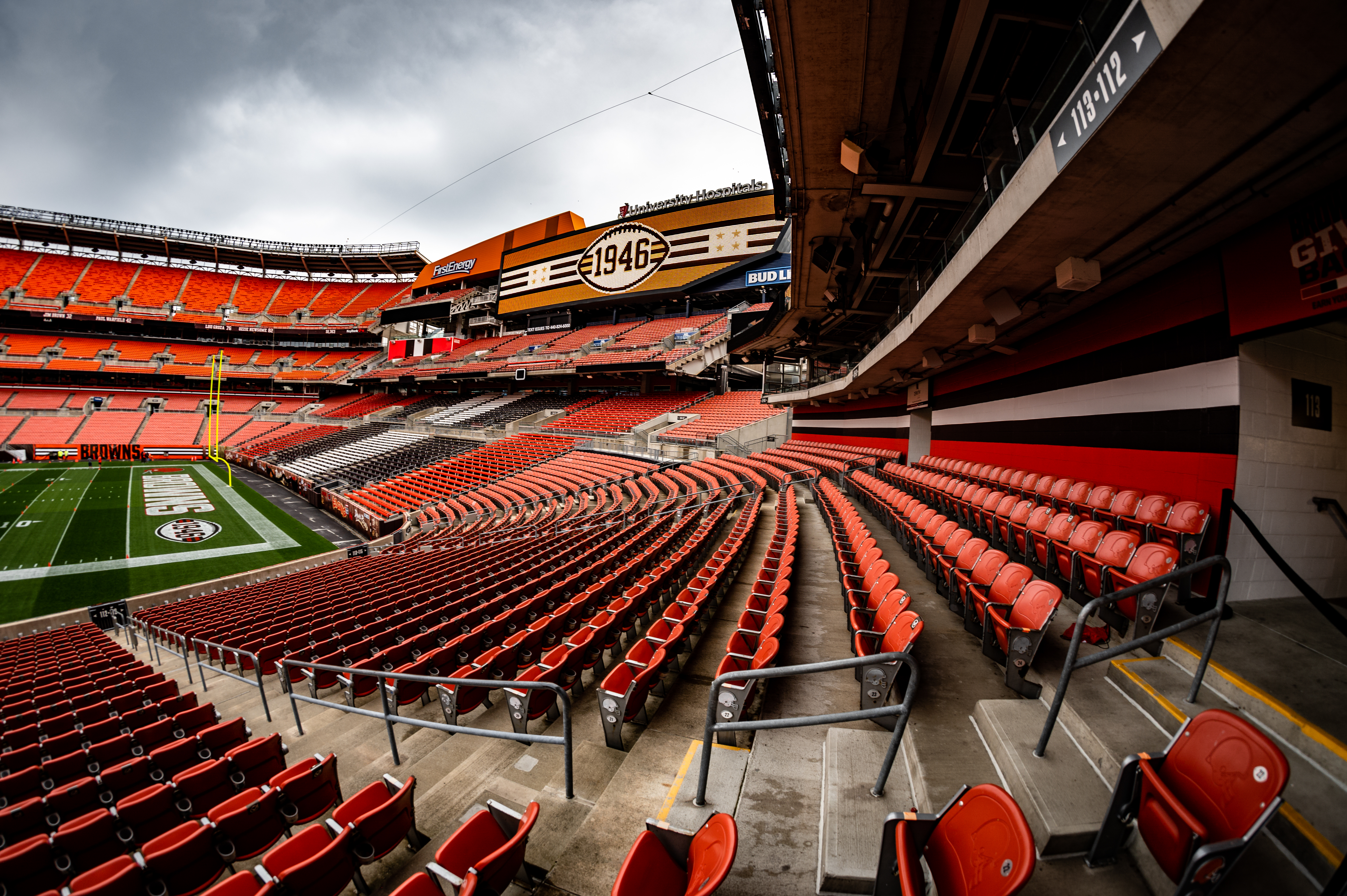
The Dawg Pound in 2021

The stadium was designed by Populous, which was known at the time as the Sport Venue Event Division of Hellmuth, Obata & Kassabaum (HOK). Indianapolis-based Huber, Hunt & Nichols was the construction manager. The stadium is a concrete and glass structure, using precast concrete and cast in-place for the upper concourse. Natural stone accents were used at the base of the stadium. The construction of the concrete superstructure took more than 6,000 truckloads of concrete, or the equivalent of 60,000 cubic yards (46,000 m^{3}), with a weight of approximately 235 million pounds (107,000,000 kg).

The playing surface is a Kentucky Bluegrass irrigated field, with a sand-soil root zone and an underground heating system that involves nine boilers and 40 miles (64 km) of underground piping. The heating system prevents the field from freezing and extends the growing season of the turf. Although it was designed for football, the playing surface was built large enough to accommodate international soccer matches.

The eastern seating section is the home of the Dawg Pound, a section of bleacher seats. It was designed as a successor to the original Dawg Pound at Cleveland Stadium, the bleacher section also located in the east end zone. When Huntington Bank Field opened in 1999, the Dawg Pound was a 10,644, double-deck area. During stadium renovations in 2014, the upper level of the Dawg Pound was reduced to make way for a new, larger scoreboard, auxiliary scoreboard, and additional fan areas, and the bleacher seating in the upper level was replaced with chairbacks.

=== Renovations ===
In 2013, Browns owner Jimmy Haslam announced a modernization project for the stadium. The project included two phases that took place during the NFL offseasons in 2014 and 2015. Phase one included improving the audio system, installing new scoreboards three times the size of the original scoreboards and at the time the fourth largest in an NFL stadium, as well as adding more seats to the lower bowl. Phase two included concession improvements, upgrades to technology connectivity, graphics throughout the stadium, and enhancing the premium suites. The renovations reduced the stadium's capacity to approximately 68,000. The total cost of the renovations was estimated at $120 million with the city of Cleveland paying $30 million over 15 years and the Browns covering the rest of the cost.

=== Stadium naming ===
Logo used from 2013 to 2023

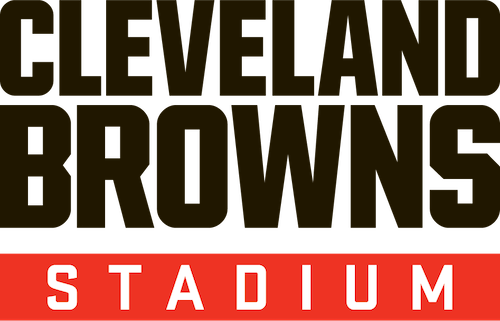
Logo used from 2023 to 2024

The city specifically chose not to sell the naming rights to the stadium itself, which is highly unusual for major American stadiums built in recent years. However, it instead sold the naming rights to each of the facility's four main entrance gates. Originally, the gates were named for National City Bank, Steris Corp., CoreComm Inc., and the Cleveland Clinic Sports Health. The arrangement was later discontinued, though has since been restored. As of the 2025 season, the southwest gate is sponsored by Meijer, the southeast gate is sponsored by University Hospitals of Cleveland, the northwest gate by Huntington Bank, and the northeast gate by Electronic Merchant Systems.

Randy Lerner sold the Browns to Jimmy Haslam, CEO of truck stop chain Pilot Flying J, in August 2012. Before the deal officially closed in October 2012, Haslam announced he would sell the stadium's naming rights. Haslam effectively ruled out his family business as buying the naming rights, mentioning that he had received offers for the naming rights, and that none of them are based in his home state of Tennessee. On January 14, 2013, it was reported that the naming rights were sold to FirstEnergy Corporation, the Akron-based electric utility serving most of northeastern Ohio. The Browns announced the following day that the stadium would be renamed "FirstEnergy Stadium, Home of the Cleveland Browns", with the deal getting official Cleveland City Council approval on February 15, 2013. Ironically, the stadium's power is actually generated and paid for through the city's power utility, Cleveland Public Power, instead of FirstEnergy.

Because of the Ohio nuclear bribery scandal and FirstEnergy's involvement in it, Cleveland City Council passed a resolution in June 2022 to urge FirstEnergy to relinquish its naming rights. At the time, neither the Browns nor FirstEnergy motioned that the agreement would be revoked. The Browns then announced on April 13, 2023, that the team and FirstEnergy had come to an agreement to immediately terminate the naming rights deal, restoring the stadium's original moniker. The original agreement was set to expire in 2029.

Haslam Sports Group announced on September 3, 2024, they had sold naming rights to Huntington Bank, based in Columbus, Ohio, in a 20-year partnership agreement. If the team eventually moves to a new stadium elsewhere in the region, the naming rights will follow the team to the new facility.

=== Services ===
The stadium does not have public parking facilities. However, there are several adjacent parking facilities: the Port Authority visitors lot, the West 3rd Street parking lot, the Great Lakes Science Center parking garage, and the city of Cleveland municipal parking lots, the latter being where tailgating on game days is common. Additionally, the West 3rd Street station of Cleveland's Waterfront light rail line serves the stadium.

== Other events ==
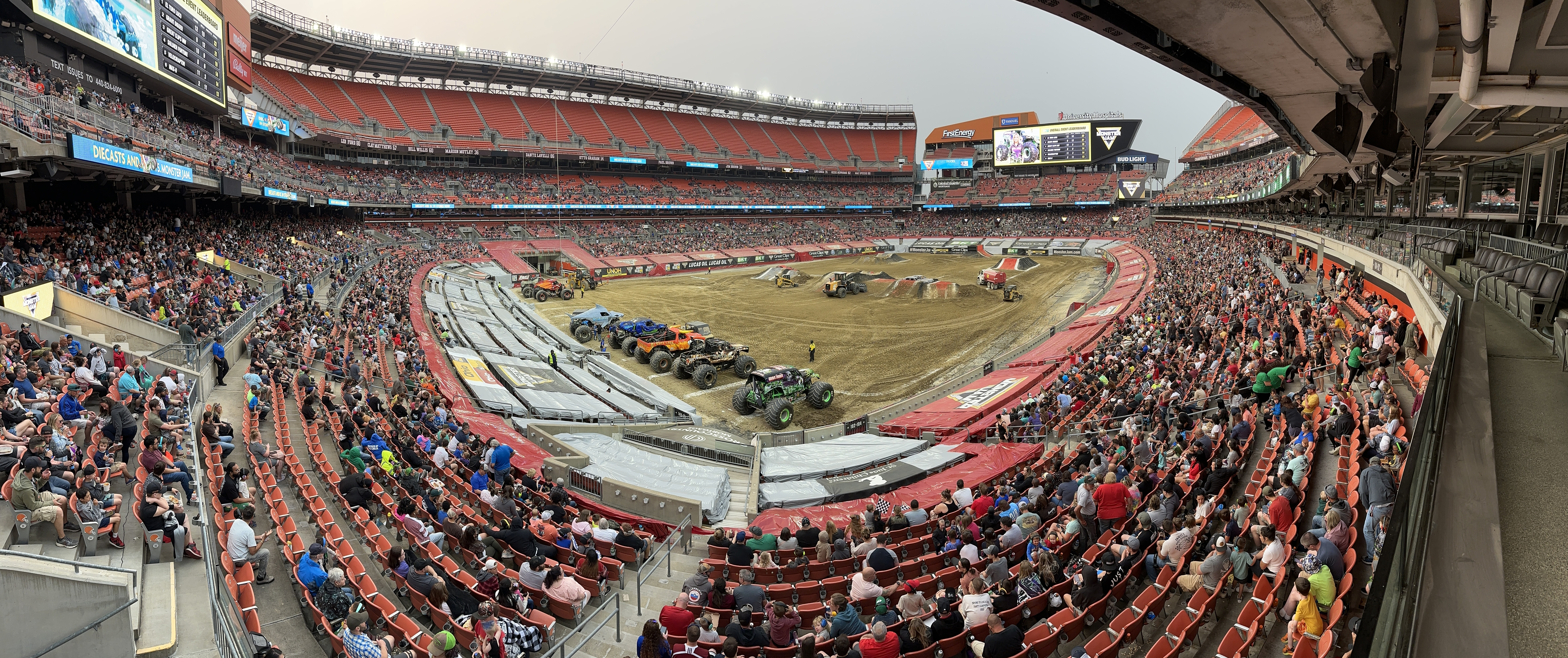
Monster Jam, June 3, 2023

In addition to home games for the Browns, the stadium hosts other events during the year, including college football, high school football, international soccer, concerts, and other events.

The Ohio Classic, a college football game featuring Historically Black Colleges and Universities, was held at the stadium in 2003 and 2005. In September 2006, it hosted the game between the Bowling Green Falcons and Wisconsin Badgers, which had an announced attendance of 30,307 people. From 2007 through 2009, the stadium hosted an event known as the Patriot Bowl, a season-opening game intended to showcase teams from the Mid-American Conference. The first Patriot Bowl featured the Army Black Knights and Akron Zips and drew 17,835 fans. The following season, Boston College defeated Kent State in the second Patriot Bowl on August 30, 2008 in front of 10,788 people. The third and final Patriot Bowl game was between the Ohio State Buckeyes and Toledo Rockets. While the game was considered a home game for Toledo, the crowd of 71,727 was mostly Ohio State fans.

Huntington Bank Field has hosted numerous high school football games, including playoff games of the Ohio High School Athletic Association (OHSAA) tournament. In 2010 and 2011, the Browns revived the Charity Football Game, which had been held from 1931 to 1987 and was hosted at Cleveland Stadium until 1970. The revived version, called the High School Football Charity Games, was a doubleheader that featured four area high school teams. The 2010 edition, played August 28, featured Saint Edward High School and Mentor High School in the first game, and Saint Ignatius and Lake Catholic High School in the second game. The 2011 edition, played August 27, featured Mayfield High School and Medina High School in the first game, and Glenville High School and St. Edward High School in the second game. The rivalry game between two of the Cleveland area's largest parochial high schools, St. Ignatius and St. Edward, has been held at the stadium on three occasions: October 2016, which had 17,400 fans in attendance; October 2018; and again in September 2020. St. Ignatius returned to the stadium in August 2022 against Mentor.

In addition to football and other field sports, Monster Jam has been held at the stadium on two occasions, the first being July 2, 2022, and then again on June 3, 2023. The stadium was also the setting for Progressive Corporation's At Home campaign showing then-Browns quarterback Baker Mayfield living with his wife in the facility. Huntington Bank Field hosted the 37th edition of WWE's premium live event SummerSlam, with an attendance of 57,791 on August 3, 2024.

=== Soccer ===
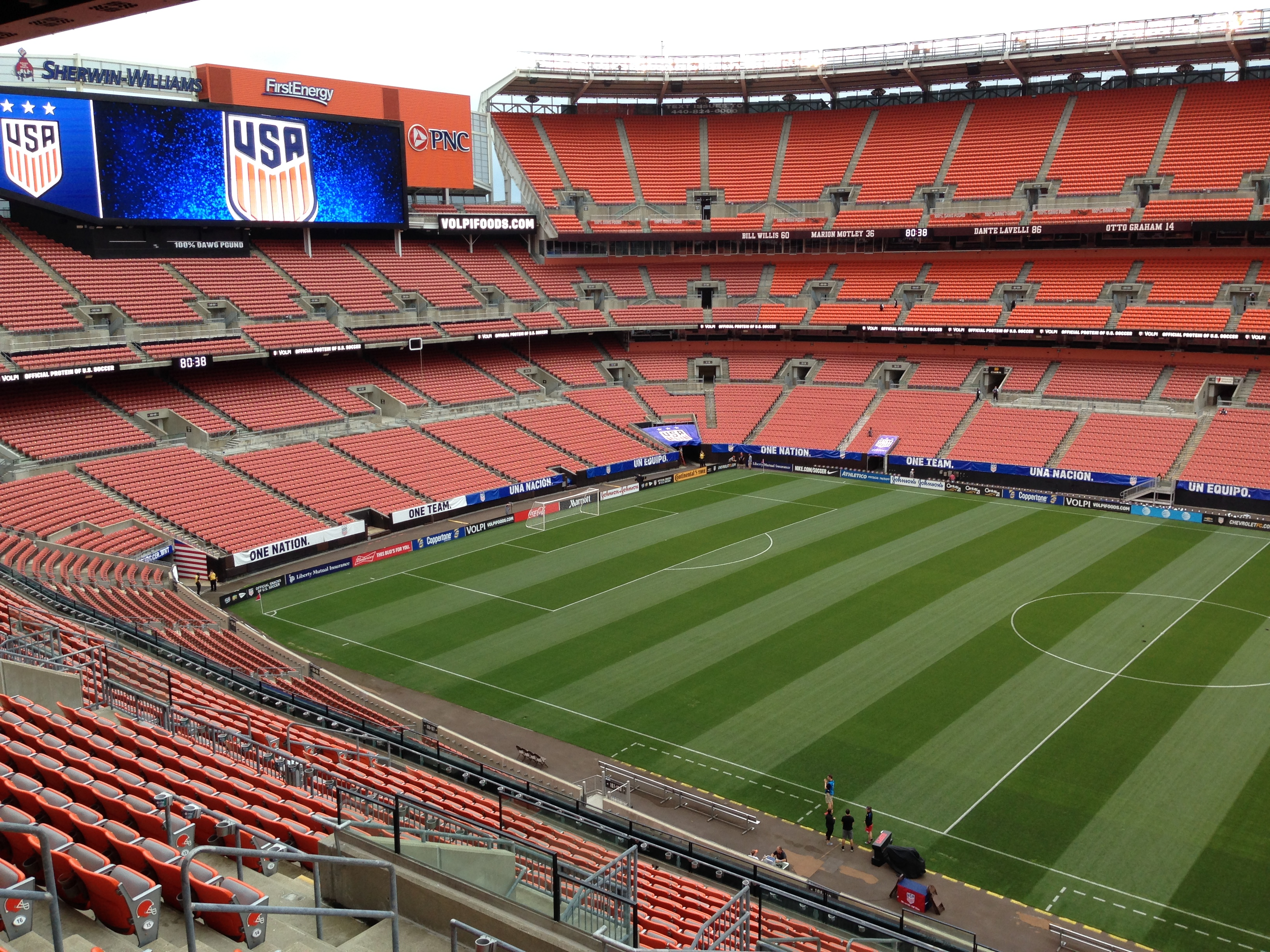
Lined for soccer in 2016

Huntington Bank Field is a periodic host for both the United States men's (USMNT) and women's national soccer (USWNT) teams. The stadium hosted a match between the USMNT and Venezuela in the run-up to the 2006 FIFA World Cup, a 2–0 victory for the US, and a 4–2 loss in 2013 against Belgium that drew 27,720 fans. The stadium, then known as FirstEnergy Stadium, hosted games in the group stage of the 2017 CONCACAF Gold Cup, with the USMNT playing July 15, 2017, against Nicaragua as part of a doubleheader that also included Panama and Martinique. Both Panama and the United States won their respective matches by a score of 3–0. The stadium again hosted group stage play during the 2019 CONCACAF Gold Cup, with Panama defeating Guyana 4–2 and the USMNT winning 6–0 over Trinidad and Tobago.

The USWNT has played at the stadium on three occasions, with the most recent being in 2018. It hosted a 4–0 friendly victory against Germany in 2010 and the second leg of a friendly series with Japan in 2016, a 2–0 win for the USWNT. The game against Japan had 23,535 fans in attendance, the largest crowd to see the USWNT play in Ohio. The USWNT returned on June 12, 2018, in a game against China, won by the U.S. 2–1.

Columbus Crew hosted Inter Miami CF in a regular season Major League Soccer game at the stadium on April 19, 2025, to capitalize on the popularity of Inter Miami player and soccer legend Lionel Messi. The match drew a club-record attendance of 60,614 spectators, but the venue change was criticized by some Crew fans and was subject to a soft boycott by supporters' group Nordecke.

=== Concerts ===
A limited number of concerts have been held at Huntington Bank Field since it opened. The first concert held in the stadium was George Strait in 2000, followed in 2001 by NSYNC, as part of their PopOdyssey Tour, and The Three Tenors. Kenny Chesney has performed at the stadium on three occasions. His Flip-Flop Summer Tour came to Cleveland in 2007, followed by The Poets and Pirates Tour in 2008, and the Brothers of the Sun Tour in 2012. In 2015, the stadium was part of the circuits for One Direction and their On the Road Again Tour as well as Luke Bryan and his Kick the Dust Up Tour. U2 performed at Huntington Bank Field July 1, 2017 as part of The Joshua Tree Tour 2017. Tickets for the concert went on sale January 17 and were sold out the following day. Concerts held at the stadium in 2018 included Taylor Swift as part of her Reputation Stadium Tour on July 17, followed by Beyoncé and Jay-Z on July 25 as part of their On the Run II Tour.

Concerts scheduled for 2020 and 2021 were canceled as a result of the COVID-19 pandemic, but returned to the stadium in 2022. Def Leppard and Mötley Crüe continued their The Stadium Tour on July 14 in front of 34,815 people, and Machine Gun Kelly, a Cleveland-area native, held the last US stop of his Mainstream Sellout Tour on August 13, playing in front of 42,086 fans in a concert that featured Avril Lavigne, Travis Barker, Willow Smith, Trippie Redd, and 44phantom. The Rolling Stones, originally scheduled to perform at the stadium in 2020 during the No Filter Tour, performed to a sold-out crowd at the stadium on June 15, 2024, as part of their Hackney Diamonds Tour. Billy Joel and Rod Stewart performed at the stadium September 13, 2024.

=== Hockey ===
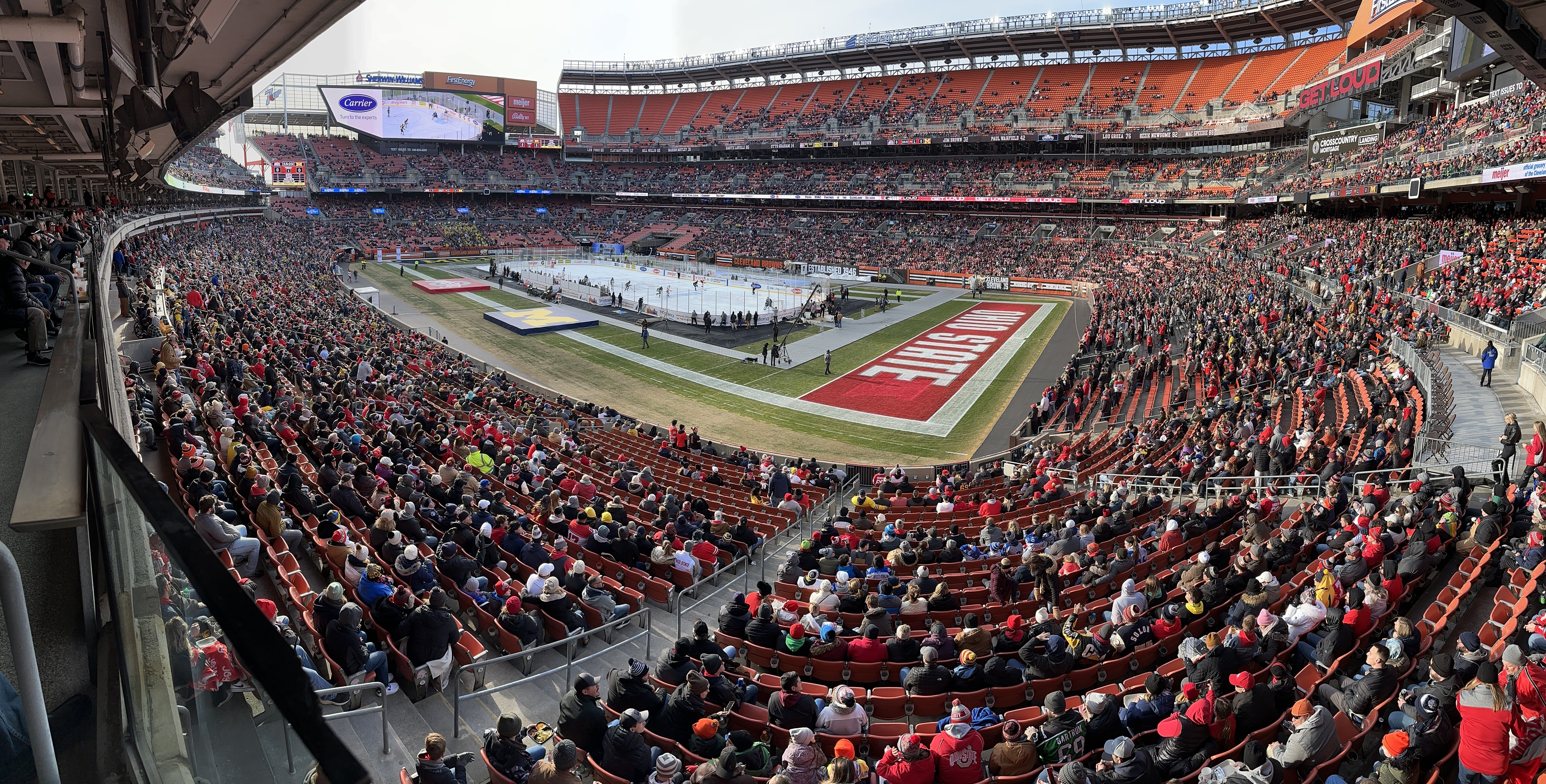
View of the stadium during Faceoff on the Lake in February 2023

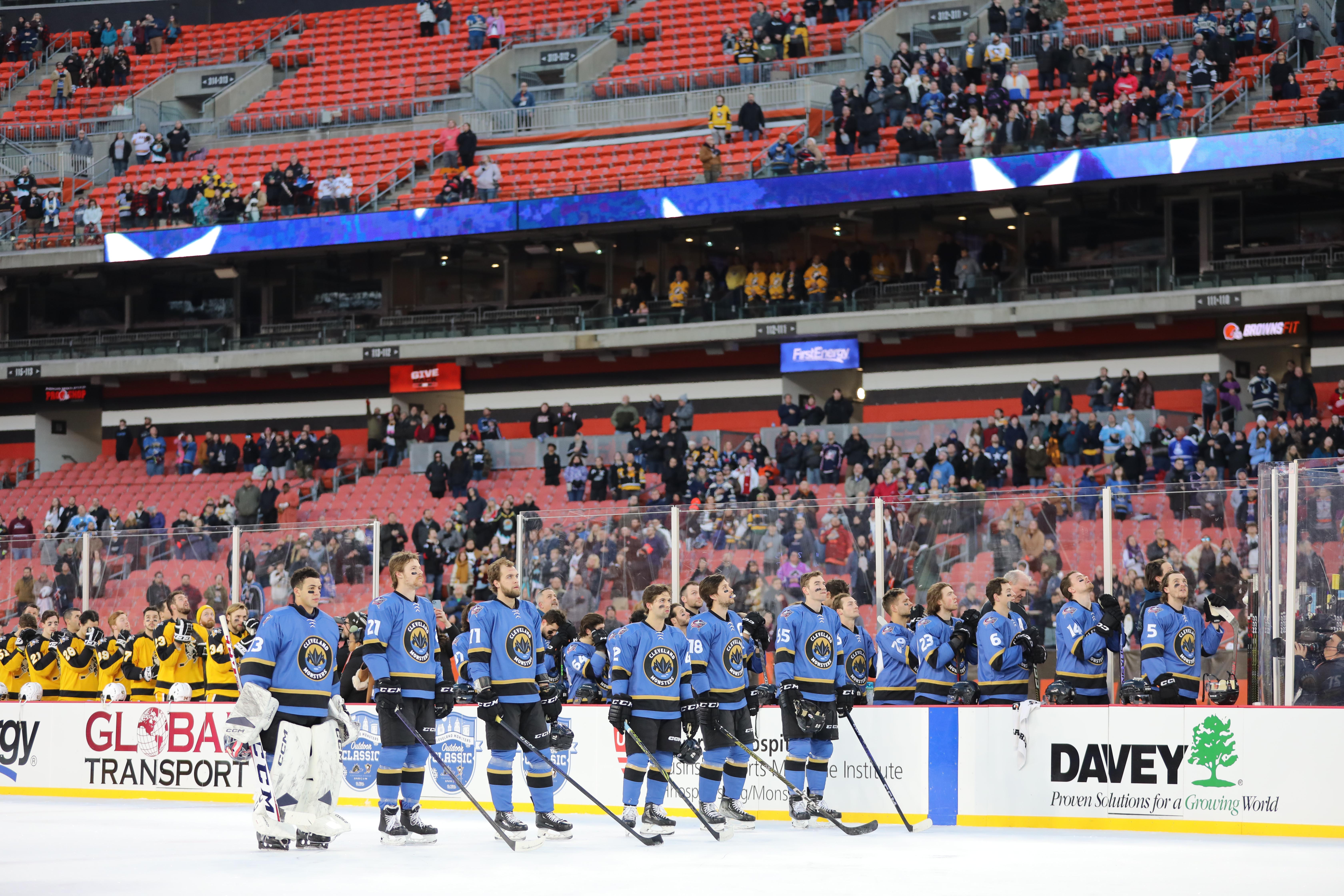
Cleveland Monsters Outdoor Classic

Huntington Bank Field has also served as an outdoor venue for ice hockey, the first time being in early 2023. The headline event was announced August 22, 2022, a college ice hockey game between Michigan and Ohio State, titled Faceoff on the Lake. Later, on October 11, 2022, it was announced that the stadium would also host an American Hockey League game between the Cleveland Monsters and the Wilkes-Barre/Scranton Penguins, titled the Cleveland Monsters Outdoor Classic. The games highlighted multiple events the stadium hosted using the temporary ice rink built on the playing field.

The first ice hockey game played at the stadium on February 17, 2023, between John Carroll University and Canisius College of the American Collegiate Hockey Association, a club-level college ice hockey league. The game, titled the “John Carroll University Outdoor Classic”, was won by John Carroll, 5–4. Faceoff on the Lake was held the following day, where Ohio State defeated Michigan 4–2 in front of 45,523 fans, which set an attendance record for an outdoor college hockey game at a neutral site. The Cleveland Monsters Outdoor Classic was held March 4, but the start had to be delayed five hours due to ice conditions. The Monsters went on to defeat the Penguins 3–2 in overtime with an attendance of 22,875.

Additional ice hockey games were held at the stadium in between Faceoff on the Lake and the Monsters Outdoor Classic. A United States Hockey League (USHL) game, known as the USHL Cleveland Classic, was held February 22 between the Youngstown Phantoms and Cedar Rapids Roughriders. The game was won by the Phantoms 4–1. The Ohio High School Athletic Association hosted two playoff games at the stadium on February 25 and 26. They were also scheduled to host games on March 3, but the March 3 games had to be moved to an indoor facility in nearby Brooklyn, Ohio, due to rain. Public skating was also available on February 22 and 25.

== See also ==
- Chronology of home stadiums for current National Football League teams
- List of American football stadiums by capacity
- List of U.S. stadiums by capacity
- List of North American stadiums by capacity
- Lists of stadiums

| Preceded by Cleveland Stadium | Home of the Cleveland Browns; 1999–present | Succeeded by New Huntington Bank Field (2029) |
