= Montage (TV series) =

Montage crew, left to right: Jon Boynton; Howard Schwartz; Dick Mrzena; Gary Robinson; Dennis Goulden.

The Montage programs, a filmed history of the 1960s and 1970s with a Cleveland perspective, are composed of more than three hundred documentary films which were shown primarily on WKYC-TV, Cleveland's NBC affiliate, from September 1965 to December 1978. The series was produced and directed by Dennis Goulden.

== History ==
In 1955, NBC forced Westinghouse Broadcasting to trade its NBC-affiliated Philadelphia station WPTZ-TV to NBC in exchange for WNBK-TV in Cleveland. In 1965, NBC was forced to reverse the trade on orders from the Federal Communications Commission (FCC) and Justice Department. When NBC regained control of the Cleveland station, it renamed it WKYC-TV and moved several shows from Philadelphia to Cleveland. One of these was the documentary series Montage, and Goulden became executive producer of the show.

Montage profiled local personalities, such as the director of the Cleveland Orchestra Lorin Maazel and Cleveland Browns coach Paul Brown, and national ones such as Olympic skater Jo Jo Starbuck and Oscar-nominated actor William Gargan. It also looked at national issues with a local perspective. Pollution, race, homosexuality, drugs, crime, housing, education, medical advancements, the Vietnam War, and many other issues were examined. Some shows had guest hosts, including Bill Cosby and Robert Stack. The Montage unit traveled to Australia, Asia, Europe, and South America to pursue stories. These shows were often broadcast on the other NBC owned-and-operated stations, PBS stations, and others. In 1976, the show experimented with a magazine format for several of the shows.

Goulden produced the show until 1978, when the show was cancelled. During that time over 300 episodes were produced. The show won dozens of Emmys and dozens more nominations, and hundreds of other awards. Several of the completed shows, as well as raw footage, audio, scripts, production notes, and other materials were given by Dennis Goulden and WKYC-TV to the library at Cleveland State University in 1980.

== Cast and crew ==
- Doug Adair – Narrator
- John Beyer – Writer, Associate Producer
- Jon Boynton – Writer, Producer
- Virgil Dominic – Narrator
- Dennis Goulden – Unit Manager, Executive Producer, Producer, director, Writer, Cinematographer, Film Editor
- Terri Harken – Associate Producer
- Bill Leonard – Writer, Producer
- Gary Miller – Associate Producer
- Dick Mrzena – Editor
- Gary Robinson – Producer, Director, Writer
- Paul Schoenwetter – Writer, Director, Associate Producer
- Howard Schwartz – Producer, Director, Writer

== Partial list of participants ==
- Roy Acuff
- Art Arfons
- Bob Babich
- Rudy and Janet Bachna
- Jim Bede
- Jim Brown
- Paul Brown
- Nigel Butterley
- Alvin Dark
- Leo Durocher
- Donald Erb
- Dick Feagler
- William Gargan
- Don Gentile
- Forrest Gregg
- John A. Hannah
- Robert Hooks
- Ron Karenga
- Jack Kemp
- Wally Kinnan
- Daryle Lamonica
- Sherman Lee
- Richard Lugar
- Janet Lynn
- Lorin Maazel
- Russell Means
- Ralph Nader
- Dennis Nahat
- Mary Rose Oakar
- Ray Osrin
- Gabe Paul
- Webb Pierce
- Jackie Presser
- Greg Pruitt
- Tex Ritter
- Frank Robinson
- Lou Saban
- Moshe Safdie
- John Seiberling
- Kenneth Shelley
- Jo Jo Starbuck
- Carl Stokes
- Louis Stokes
- Birdie Tebbetts
- Stewart Udall
- Raymond Wilding-White
