= Leon Bibb =

Leon Bibb may refer to:

- Leon Bibb (newscaster)
- Leon Bibb (musician)
