= Stroke Heroes Act FAST =

Stroke Heroes Act FAST is a public health campaign produced by the Heart Disease and Stroke Prevention and Control Program at the Massachusetts Department of Public Health. Begun in 2006, it is dedicated to increasing stroke recognition and shortening the time between the onset of stroke symptoms and arrival at a hospital's emergency department.

"Time lost is brain lost" is a phrase often used in stroke prevention programs. Because quick treatment can help avoid death or permanent physical disability, the FAST campaign stresses the need for immediate action by calling 9-1-1.

FAST teaches the signs and symptoms of stroke through its acronym, which stands for: Face, Arm, Speech, and Time. The highlight of the campaign is a 3-minute animated video produced by Geovision. Accompanying the video are posters, brochures, wallet-sized cards, and PowerPoints. All of the items are available in English, Spanish, and Portuguese (with Khmer on the way). The PowerPoints are part of an education kit that is meant as a train-the-trainer module, and is also available in the three languages.

A paid media campaign has accompanied the distribution of materials, and has included television, radio, print media, and transit cards on public transportation. To date, FAST materials have been used in 48 states and 28 countries, including Canada, Japan, and the Dominican Republic.

== Evaluation of campaign ==
The Heart Disease and Stroke Prevention and Control Program has evaluated each of the media campaigns to demonstrate knowledge and awareness change concerning stroke signs and symptoms. Prior to running the initial media campaign in a specific language and after each subsequent campaign, a survey was administered to a random sample of Massachusetts adults. The validated survey questionnaire addresses stroke signs and symptoms knowledge, impetus to call 9-1-1 at any sign of a stroke, awareness of stroke advertising, as well as familiarity with the campaign and its terminology. These data have shown a significant increase in awareness and knowledge over time, confirming the effectiveness of the campaigns in Massachusetts.

== Awards ==
The campaign video won the Silver Award for production at the 27th annual Telly Awards, which recognizes the "finest video and film productions". In 2008, two Gabriel Awards were given for "Community Awareness/PSA" for the Spanish-language version of the video. It has also been honoured with the 2009 Media Partnership Award from the Partnership for a Heart-Healthy Stroke-Free Massachusetts (PHHSFM) organization for the campaign's leadership in using the video to increase awareness of the signs and symptoms of stroke.
