= Jay Miltner =

American journalist

- Born: September 29, 1917; Cleveland, Ohio, U.S.
- Died: April 29, 1991 (aged 73); Cuyahoga County, Ohio, U.S.
- Other names: Francis Jay Miltner
- Occupation(s): television news anchor, announcer, singer, radio and television personality

Francis Jay Miltner (September 29, 1917 – died April 29, 1991) was an American radio and television announcer and news anchor, long associated with WKYC-TV in Cleveland, Ohio and its onetime sister radio outlet for four decades.

Miltner's association with the then-NBC-owned Cleveland outlet began with its radio station, WTAM, in 1947, where he frequently appeared as a singer. When in 1948 NBC launched its television station, originally called WNBK on channel 4, Miltner joined as announcer and newscaster. He remained with the station all through its nine-year (1956–1965) run under Westinghouse Broadcasting ownership as KYW-TV, and stayed after NBC was forced back to Cleveland in 1965.

After the station adopted its current call letters of WKYC-TV, Miltner was one of the first hosts (with Bud Dancy and Linda Hunt) of a mid-afternoon show, Three on the Town, which ran with a succession of hosts through 1968. He continued, over the years, as a live booth announcer with channel 3, to the point where he became known as the "Voice of WKYC." In his final years with the station, he was the opening announcer for the morning show AM Cleveland. He retired from WKYC in 1986.

Miltner died in Cuyahoga County, Ohio of lung cancer at age 73.

== References, sources and links ==
- Obituary in Variety, June 17, 1991.
- Articles in Cleveland Classic Media blog relating to Jay Miltner
- Video clip of 1976 sign-off of WKYC-TV by Jay Miltner on YouTube
- Video clip of opening of AM Cleveland from 1984 announced by Miltner on YouTube
