= Ohio Classic =

== Event summary ==
The Ohio Classic was a college football game played annually between two teams from historically black colleges and universities (HBCU's).

The Ohio Classic was held before the start of each college football season and used to rotate between Cleveland Browns Stadium in Cleveland and Paul Brown Stadium in Cincinnati. In September 2005, organizers selected Cleveland as a permanent location.

The Ohio Classic was held over a weekend, with the game itself played on the Saturday. Concerts, educational events and other attractions highlighted the Ohio Classic Weekend. The Ohio Classic's flagship program was called the "End Zone Club", a year-round education program for students in grades 7 through 12. Participants in the program were dubbed Community Quarterbacks, to reaffirm the expectation of personal leadership. End Zone Club criteria includes proficiency, as well as ACT & SAT test tutoring. Community Quarterbacks received instruction about scheduling college preparatory courses, completing financial aid and college admissions forms.

The Ohio Classic had its inaugural year in 2003, when more than 45,000 fans attended the event in Cleveland.

== History ==
The Cincinnati Business Courier published an article in September 2004 chronicling the history of the Procter & Gamble Ohio Classic, including the organization’s financial position. The Business Courier reported that the Ohio Classic was originally named the Riverfront Classic taking the moniker of Cincinnati—the host city. John Pace and his partners started the Riverfront Classic with $150,000 in seed money.

Pace projected that the Riverfront Classic could lose as much as $900,000 in 1999, break even by 2001 and yield net revenue every year thereafter. City officials projected that the Riverfront Classic could generate an annual economic impact of $15 million for Cincinnati. Due to a scheduling conflict with the Cincinnati Bengals in May 2003, the Riverfront Classic became the Ohio Classic and rotated between Cincinnati and Cleveland.

== Event cancelled ==
The cost of producing a football Classic showcasing Historically Black Colleges and Universities more than doubled between 1999 and 2005. The increase can be attributed to 3 factors. Factor 1: Division 1 programs like The Ohio State University and Nebraska began to schedule games against Historically Black Colleges and Universities. The Ohio State University guaranteed Florida A&M University $900,000 and Nebraska guaranteed Bethune-Cookman $800,000 according to Nebraska athletics.

Pace said that prior to playing these Big Ten schools, Bethune-Cookman and Florida A&M University played in the Classic and each university received a guarantee of $250,000. Once major football programs like the Big 10 entered the marketplace, events like the Ohio Classic found the expense to schedule many of the Historically Black Colleges and Universities cost prohibitive. Factor 2: Pace noted that during this same time, fuel costs increased, driving up the cost to fly and bus football teams and marching bands to the Classic. Factor 3: Mergers and acquisitions in media industry reduced competition and increased the cost of advertising, especially in urban radio which was the primary source for advertising the Ohio Classic.

Between the years 1999 and 2005, the event's operating budget increased from $1.1 million to over $2 million and sponsorship was not increasing at the same rate, according to Pace. More troubling, the rise of the internet as a less costly alternative form of marketing made it challenging to convince corporations like Procter & Gamble to invest $400,000 annually in event sponsorship.

Back in 2001, the Classic football game was scheduled for Saturday, September 15 but had to be cancelled due to the September 11 terror attacks. That year, the Classic took a $1.3 million loss due to the cancellation. Every year thereafter the profit from the Classic was allocated to pay off that debt.

In March 2006, Pace told the Cincinnati Business Courier that he planned to cancel the Ohio Classic indefinitely but could bring the event back some time in the future.

On March 17, 2006, The Plain Dealer reported that the year's Ohio Classic has been cancelled due to mounting debt and a lack of sponsorship.

== Return of an African American tradition ==
Organizer John Pace cancelled the Ohio Classic in 2006 because the cost of producing a Classic in an NFL stadium with Division 1AA Historically Black Colleges and Universities had become cost prohibitive. Pace said in 2021 a Classic can be produced in a MLS Soccer stadium with Division II football programs at less than half the cost of his previous Ohio Classic budget, when the event rotated between Cincinnati and Cleveland. A 2021 event could generate a significant economic impact at a time when it is truly needed and raise $300,000 for scholarships and Historically Black Colleges and Universities. Pace plans to produce Classic For Columbus in Columbus, Ohio August, 2021 with support from a number of community groups and the Greater Columbus Sports Commission, according to Business First.

Pace said that in 2022, Classic For Columbus could become the Ohio Classic. Classic For Columbus (CFC) will be a weeklong celebration of educational, existential and cultural programs that complement a Jamboree Festival and football game showcasing Historically Black Colleges and Universities (HBCUs.). CFC will be held in conjunction with the National Black Alumni Reunion conference where alumni chapters from Predominantly White Institutions (PWIs) and Historically Black Colleges and Universities (HBCUs) come together for a week of chapter development seminars, social engagement training, and networking.

In early May 2020, the CFC committee, composed of leaders from fraternities, sororities, collegiate black alumni chapters and service organizations held their first meeting to determine if the African American community in Central Ohio would support an HBCU football Classic in 2021. Classics have a long history of attracting large numbers of visitors who fill up hotels and spend money at local businesses. Accordingly, the committee believes CFC can be part of Central Ohio's post COVID-19 economic recovery plan.

Shortly after that first meeting, the civil unrest, sparked by the murder of George Floyd by a police officer, highlighted the need for an event like CFC that can help bring the community together. The committee garnered support from African American organizations and in sixty days, secured pledges for over 4,250 $45 football game tickets, with more pledges coming in monthly. In July 2020, the committee voted to create an organization to operate the event and Classic For Columbus was incorporated as an Ohio nonprofit.

== Game results ==
Year	Venue	Location	Winning team	Score	Losing team
2003	Cleveland Browns Stadium	Cleveland	Hampton University	53–0	Tuskegee University
2004	Paul Brown Stadium	Cincinnati	Grambling State	24–23	Bethune–Cookman
2005	Cleveland Browns Stadium	Cleveland	Morgan State	55–26	Savannah State
2006	Event cancelled				
