= Dennis Goulden =

Canadian documentarian

- Goulden being presented a Gabriel Award
- Occupation: Film documentarian

Dennis Goulden is a documentarian who has worked as a cameraman, editor, writer, executive producer, producer and director on hundreds of films, and has received over a dozen Emmys and hundreds of other awards for his many years of work.

== Early years ==
Dennis Goulden with his camera.

Goulden was born in London, Ontario. As a child he knew he wanted to be a filmmaker, and bought his first camera when he was twelve. He graduated from London South Collegiate Institute in 1954, and began working for the London Free Press and moved to the television station owned by the newspaper, CFPL-TV in London. He served four years in the Royal Canadian Air Force Reserve while beginning his television career as "a prop man at CFPL. That meant setting scenery up, and doing any dirty work necessary. Canadian TV was five years behind America in program development but management at CFPL were incredibly supportive of their creative staff and allowed them to create many first-of types of programs. He got in on the ground floor." By 1959, Dennis was given a mandate to create a documentary unit and he began producing documentaries at CFPL and in 1960 began producing a new documentary series The World Around Us, which won several major Canadian awards. In 1964 he was recruited by then KYW-TV and moved to Cleveland, Ohio to produce documentaries for Westinghouse-owned KYW-TV. His first documentary was an hour long show on how farmers were losing their land. It was a pivotal experience for him. Then he worked on a Dr. Benjamin Spock documentary named "The Victims" produced in cooperation with the Anti-Defamation League out of New York that eventually won a silver medal at the Cannes Film Festival. He worked with Millard Lampell on that program. Lampell had been victim of "blacklisting" back in the 1950s. Goulden also produced long-form documentaries for a Westinghouse series called Focal Point Poverty with hosts like Carl Stern and Bud Dancy.

== Montage ==
In 1955, NBC forced Westinghouse to trade its NBC-affiliated Philadelphia WPTZ-TV to NBC in exchange for WNBK-TV in Cleveland. In 1965, NBC was forced to reverse the trade on orders from the Federal Communications Commission (FCC) and Justice Department. When NBC regained control of the Cleveland station, it renamed it WKYC-TV and moved several shows from Philadelphia to Cleveland. One of these was the documentary series called Montage, and in 1966 Goulden became executive producer of the show on NBC’s recently reacquired owned-and-operated station.

Montage profiled local personalities, such as the musical directors of the Cleveland Orchestra Lorin Maazel and George Szell, and Cleveland Browns coach Paul Brown, and national ones such as Olympic skater Jo Jo Starbuck and Oscar-nominated actor William Gargan. The shows were sometimes narrated by celebrities such as Bill Cosby, Robert Stack, and Jose Ferrer. It also looked at national issues with a local perspective. Pollution, race, homosexuality, drugs, crime, housing, education, medical advancements, the Vietnam War, and many other issues were examined. The Montage unit travelled to Australia, Asia, Europe, and South America to pursue stories. These shows were often broadcast on the other NBC owned-and-operated stations, PBS stations, and others.

Goulden held that position until 1978, when Montage was cancelled. During that time over 300 episodes were produced. The show won dozens of Emmys and dozens more nominations, and hundreds of other awards that included major film festivals such as New York, Atlanta, the Virgin Islands and was finalists year after year in competitions such as the Columbia-DuPont awards, the Peabodys, the Gabriels and the Ohio State awards. Many of the completed shows, as well as raw footage, audio tapes, scripts, and production notes were given to the library at Cleveland State University in 1980.

== After Montage ==
Dennis Goulden continued to work and WKYC as executive producer of their Probe 3 investigative unit until 1980, at which time he began his own production house, "North Coast Productions." He produced shows for the rapidly expanding cable market, including You Asked For It. Goulden travelled extensively to Australia and West Africa during that period. In 1982 he contracted with WEWS-TV, where he became special projects producer. He worked mainly with the news division, tightening up their standards and producing specials. His work at WEWS won him two more Emmys.

== WVIZ ==
In 1984 Goulden became local programing director of WVIZ-TV, the Cleveland PBS station. The station, under the tenure of founder and president Betty Cope, had emphasized production of educational programming for schools. Cope wanted Goulden to apply his skills to the creation of innovative local programming. During the next 4 years came the creation of a number of programs and series. Kovels On Collecting was a showcase for the antique experts Ralph and Terry Kovel. Producers Showcase gave new producers a venue to show their work. MediScene was a medical series hosted by ex-nurse M. R. Berger, and went on to win an Emmy. Dimension was modeled along the lines of CBS' Sunday Morning and aired monthly. CookSmart was hosted by Susie Heller, and guests included Jacques Pepin and Julia Child. He gave Larry Elder (now a nationally syndicated radio host) his first show. He also produced specials, such as a Paul Meincke-hosted special on the tenth anniversary of busing in Cleveland, an hour special on Margaret Bourke-White, and many others. He credits Betty Cope with their creation because, Goulden says, she let him experiment.

== Later years ==
After stepping down from his PBS job in mid-1988, Goulden became director of programming and executive producer of North Coast Cable. While there, he continued to produce shows featuring the Kovels and Larry Elder, who moved to cable with Goulden, and programming for cable stations such as the Discovery Channel, Bravo, CNBC and HGTV. In the 1990s Goulden teamed up with Geoff Sindelar, known as The Professor for his encyclopedic knowledge of football trivia and sports collectibles. Eventually the series, Sports 101, was picked up by SportsChannel America and it aired weekly and nationally for four years. Tired of the grind he and Sindelar took the show off the air in 1996 and turned again to PBS (WVIZ) where he did such widely acclaimed specials such as Holy Cleveland, an examination of Cleveland's Sacred Landmarks. He also still produces documentaries for his company (formed in 1988) DBG Communications, Inc., such as documentaries on children and violence and an annual primetime program done in partnership with a child's advocacy group, Voices For Ohio's Children. This series won an Emmy in 2007.

He produces special projects at WKYC, where he has won Emmys for his work on Dateline-Cleveland.

Goulden is creating a new web site on which to air brand new documentaries on a variety of subjects. It is possible that some of these new documentaries will be picked up by broadcast outlets for telecasting purposes. Goulden is also writing a book about his adventures while producing documentaries for 50 years and this project will be followed closely by a book of photographs taken while on location around the world. The book efforts are being augmented by Cleveland State University Library input and advice.

== Partial List of Awards ==
Emmy, Golden Circle Award, 2013

Emmy, Cleveland Regional Nomination, 2001

Emmy, 1980
