= Timothy A. Kinnan =

United States Air Force general

Timothy Alan Kinnan
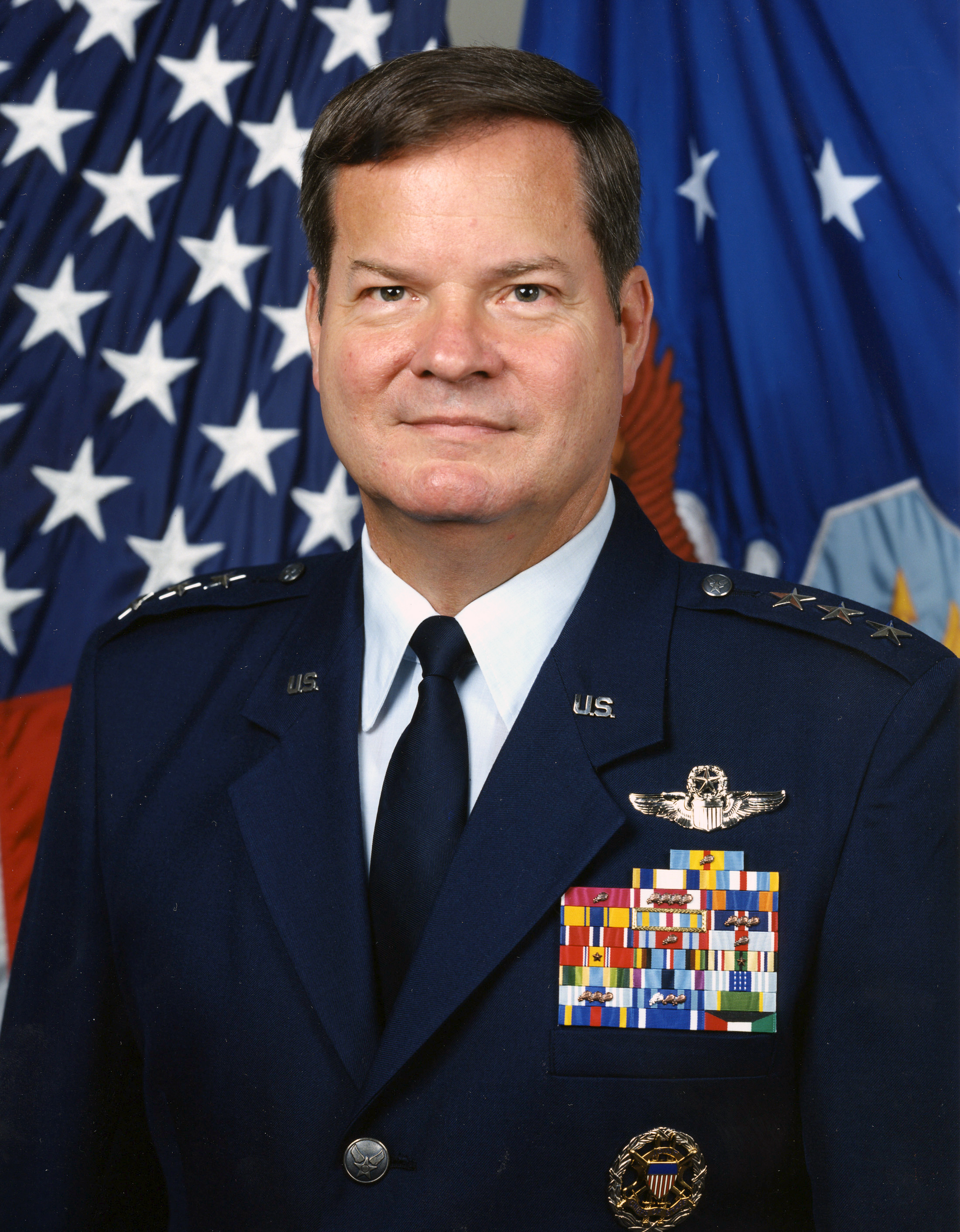
- Timothy Kinnan, USAF
- Born: April 24, 1948 (age 78); Tacoma, Washington
- Relatives: Wally Kinnan
- Military career
- Allegiance: United States of America
- Branch: United States Air Force
- Service years: 1970–2004
- Rank: Lieutenant general
- Nickname: "Conan"
- Commands: Air Force Doctrine Center Air War College; 401st Fighter Wing 347th Wing; 318th Fighter Interceptor Squadron
- Conflicts: Deny Flight, Southern Watch, Provide Comfort
- Awards: Defense Distinguished Service Medal; Air Force Distinguished Service Medal; Defense Superior Service Medal; Legion of Merit
- Other work: Vice president, C4ISR at Lockheed Martin Corporation

Timothy Alan Kinnan (born April 24, 1948) is a former lieutenant general in the United States Air Force; he retired from active duty in September 2004.

== Personal and family background ==
Kinnan was born in Tacoma, Washington to the late Henry Wallace ("Wally") Kinnan, and Marjorie Ahrendt. His father, Wally Kinnan, a pioneering television meteorologist and early television personality, was also a B-17 pilot during World War II and was shot down, spending nearly two years as a POW in Stalag Luft III. While interned Wally was a founding member of the Sagan Serenaders, a group of musicians who were immortalized in the movie The Great Escape for holding concerts to cover the sound of digging associated with the escape attempt. Wally's war-time and peacetime service created in Tim a strong interest in the US Air Force. Getting both the interest in flying and an interest in music from his father he had to make a choice between the US Air Force Academy and music school. The Air Force won out and he entered the US Air Force Academy in 1966 receiving his commission in 1970. Following graduation he married Sue Kelley. He has two daughters.

== Education ==
Kinnan's military education includes the United States Air Force Academy (USAFA) in Colorado Springs, Colorado (Class of 1970); Distinguished Graduate Air Force Squadron Officers School in 1974, Air Command and Staff College in 1976, Armed Forces Staff College in 1981, Distinguished Graduate National War College in 1990, Joint Force Air Component Commander Course in 1995 and Joint Flag Officer Warfighting Course in 1997.

In his civilian studies, he earned a Master of Science degree in astronautical and aeronautical engineering from Purdue University.

== Service career ==
Kinnan was commissioned a second lieutenant upon graduation from the U.S. Air Force Academy with the Class of 1970.

He was a command pilot with more than 3,000 flying hours, primarily in the F-4, F-15 and F-16.

In 1977, he was awarded the first Risner Trophy as the outstanding graduate of the USAF Weapons School.

In 1993, as commander of the 401st Fighter Wing in Aviano, Italy, he led the beddown and support of joint and combined airpower in NATO's Deny Flight Operation over Bosnia and Herzegovina. Later, as commander of the 347th Wing, he was responsible for the first operational deployment to Southwest Asia under the Air Force's aerospace expeditionary force concept. Other commands include an F-15 squadron, the Air War College and Air Force Doctrine Center.

General Kinnan served as vice director for strategic plans and policy with the Joint Staff in Washington, D.C., supporting the Chairman of the Joint Chiefs of Staff in developing military strategy and policy within the interagency process in Washington.

His final active duty assignment was U.S. military representative to the North Atlantic Treaty Organization Military Committee, NATO Headquarters, Brussels, Belgium. He represented the Chairman of the Joint Chiefs of Staff in deliberations and actions of the military committee, NATO's highest military authority. He also worked with military representatives of NATO and Partnership for Peace member nations to develop policy recommendations for the political authorities of the alliance.

== Civilian career ==
Until February 2007 he was vice president, C4ISR at Lockheed Martin Corporation.

== Flight information ==
- Rating: Command Pilot
- Flight hours: More than 3000
- Aircraft flown: F-4, F-15 and F-16

== Major awards and decorations ==
- Defense Distinguished Service Medal (with 2 Oak Leaf Clusters)
- Air Force Distinguished Service Medal
- Defense Superior Service Medal
- Legion of Merit (with Oak Leaf Cluster)
- Meritorious Service Medal (with 4 Oak Leaf Clusters)
- Air Medal
- Air Force Commendation Medal
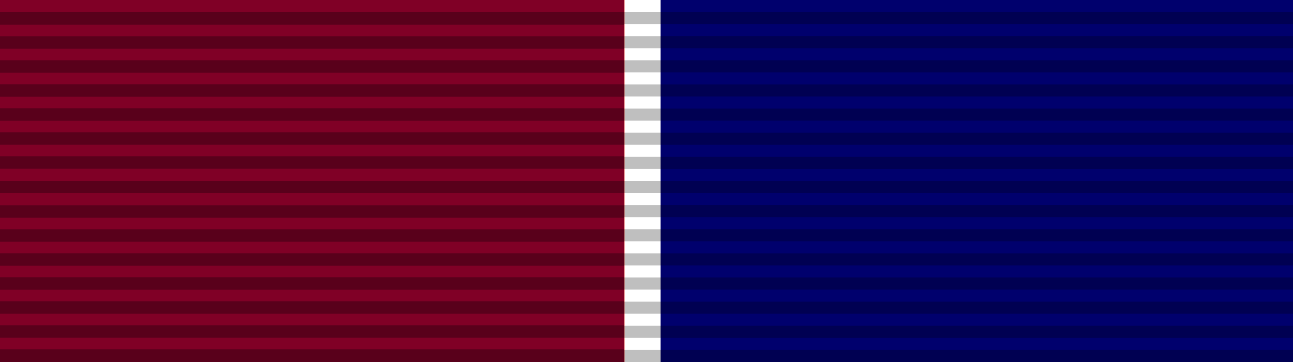
- Commemorative Medal for Advancing Latvia's Membership to NATO
- Joint Chiefs of Staff Identification Badge
- Robinson Risner Trophy, 1977
- Purdue University Outstanding Aerospace Engineer Award, 2008

=== Effective Dates Of Promotion ===
- Second Lieutenant — June 3, 1970
- First Lieutenant — December 3, 1971
- Captain — December 3, 1973
- Major — September 1, 1979
- Lieutenant Colonel — December 1, 1982
- Colonel — April 1, 1988
- Brigadier General — August 15, 1994
- Major General — August 15, 1996
- Lieutenant General — September 1, 2001

== Official military biography pages ==
- Kinnan biography at NATO International weblink
