= Gabriel Award =

- Documentarian Dennis Goulden being presented with a Gabriel Award.
- Sponsored by: Catholic Media Association
- First award: 1965; 61 years ago

The Gabriel Awards are a Catholic honor awarded each year for excellence in broadcasting. They were started by the Catholic Academy for Communication Arts Professionals in 1965, and are currently administered by the Catholic Media Association.

== Description ==
Awards are given to national and local market radio and television broadcasters to "recognize outstanding artistic achievement ... which entertains and enriches with a true vision of humanity ..."

The single most important criterion of a Gabriel winning program is its ability to uplift and nourish the human spirit. Gabriel-worthy programs affirm the dignity of human beings, and recognize and uphold universally-recognized human values such as community, creativity, tolerance, justice, compassion and the dedication to excellence.

— Catholic Academy of Communication Professionals, The Gabriel Awards

In 2014, for example, television station WRAL in Raleigh, North Carolina, was recognized by the Gabriel Awards for its news division's production of programs dealing with childhood homelessness and conditions in Haiti.
