= Mike Polk =

American comedian

Mike Polk, Jr.
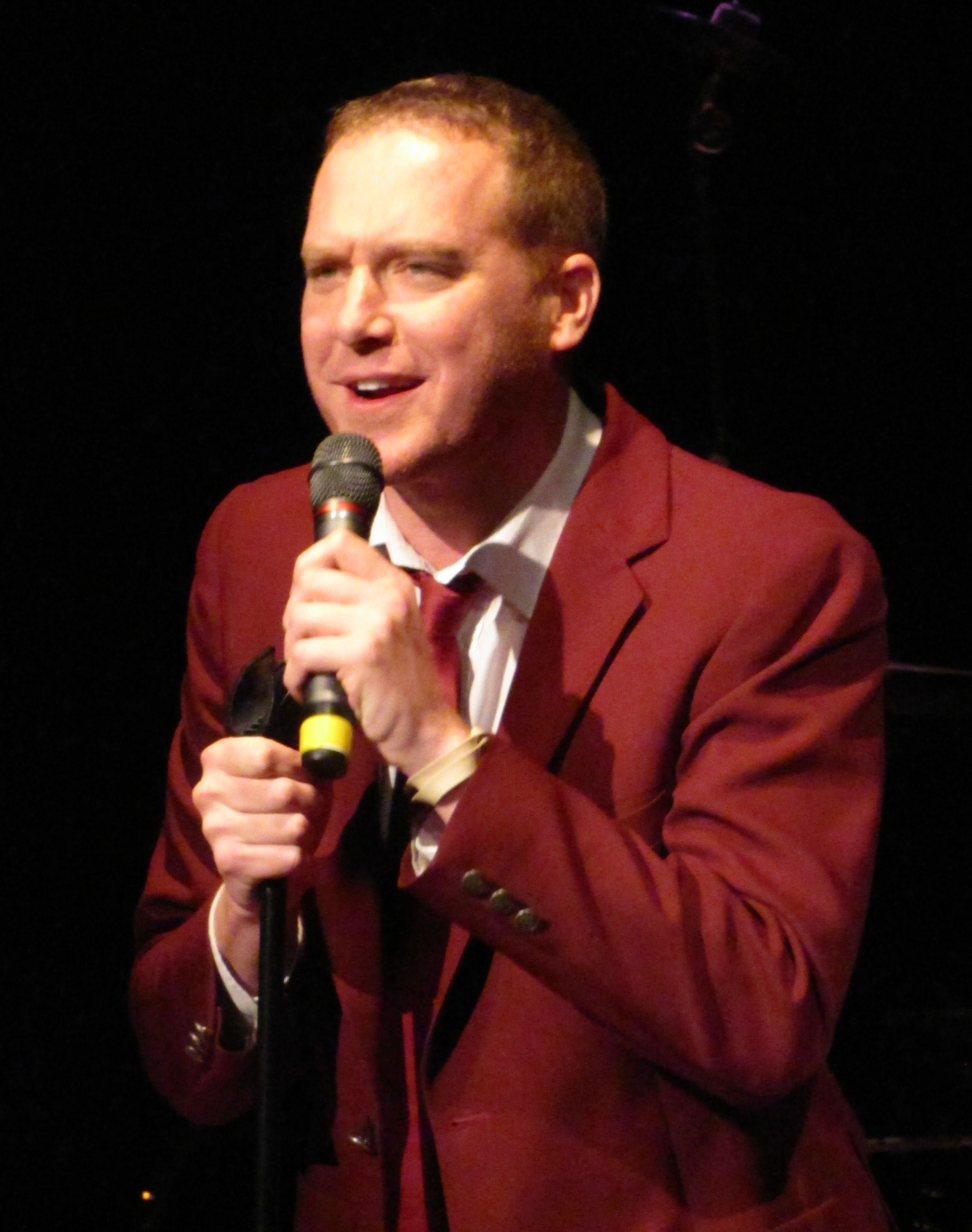
- Born: Michael G. Polk Jr. Warren, Ohio, US
- Education: Kent State University
- Occupations: Actor; Comedian; Newspaper columnist; TV news commentator

Michael G. Polk Jr. is an American comedian, actor, TV commentator, and newspaper columnist, known primarily for his sketch comedy and viral videos.

== Early life and education ==
Polk was born in Warren, Ohio. After being raised in Newton Falls, Ohio, he attended Kent State University as an undergraduate and earned a degree in communications and psychology in 2002.

== Career ==
Polk created the YouTube series Runaway Box / Man in the Box. His work has also appeared on HBO, Cinemax and TNT's Inside the NBA.

He sang his YouTube song "One Semester of Spanish - Love Song" for Kim Kardashian on Spanish television channel Telemundo. That video has received over 9.4 million views on YouTube. He thanked his viewers as "Spanish Mike" when the video hit 2 Million views.

Some of his other work includes "Ooh Girl!" - An Honest R&B Song", "The Great Office War", "The Factory of Sadness" and two different versions of a "Hastily Made Cleveland Tourism Video" all of which have about 32 million views combined on YouTube. The second version of the Cleveland tourism video ended with the slogan "At Least We're Not Detroit!". The tourism spoof video actually prompted Cleveland's convention and tourism bureau to solicit other videos in a 'counterattack' to Polk's not-so-flattering work. Segments of the Cleveland tourism videos were also featured in the Michael Moore documentary film Capitalism: A Love Story.

In 2010, Polk coordinated a group of local celebrities in order to record "Please Stay, LeBron", a parody of the charity song "We Are the World", in order to persuade NBA player LeBron James not to leave the Cavaliers.

In 2012, Polk became a weekly contributor on The Rizzo Show – a Sunday night sports/comedy program airing WJW channel 8 in Cleveland (the local FOX affiliate) hosted by local sports media personality Tony Rizzo. Polk also contributed to the sports section of the nightly news broadcast with Browns Hangover, a recurring segment providing comedic commentary after Cleveland Browns games.

Polk has also worked for Funny or Die and has performed in a local comedy troupe called Last Call Cleveland since 1999.

In 2016, Polk became a writer for the Plain Dealer newspaper, doing periodic columns about pop culture and humor.

In 2019, Cleveland NBC affiliate WKYC channel 3 hired Polk as a feature reporter and contributor. That same year – with the 2019 MLB All-Star Game occurring in Cleveland – ESPN solicited Polk to make a third "Hastily Made Tourism Video" for Cleveland, which he released on July 9, 2019.

== Awards ==
Polk was named as one of Cleveland Magazine's Most Interesting People of 2010.

In 2013 readers of Scene Magazine voted him to be Cleveland's Best Local Comedian and Best Local Author for his book Damn Right I'm From Cleveland.

in 2022, Polk won three Lower Great Lakes Emmy Awards in various categories in his role as commentator/host on WKYC.

== Personal life ==
In 2024 Polk became engaged to local journalist Stephanie Haney, with a wedding planned for September 2025.

== Bibliography ==
Damn Right I'm From Cleveland (2012 ISBN 978-1-938441-07-3)
