= WKYC =

Television station in Cleveland

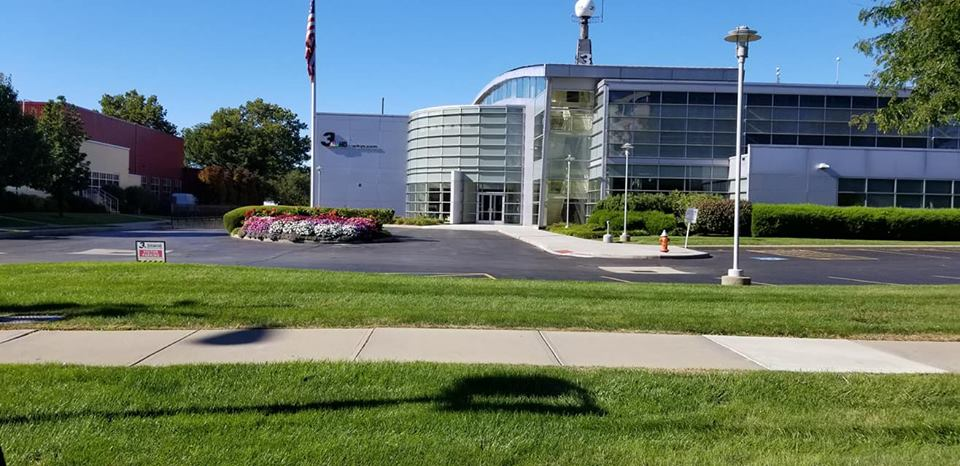
- WKYC's studios in Downtown Cleveland
- Cleveland, Ohio; United States
- Channels: Digital: 19 (UHF); Virtual: 3
- Branding: WKYC Studios, 3 News

Programming
- Affiliations: 3.1: NBC; for others, see § Subchannels

Ownership
- Owner: Tegna Inc., a subsidiary of Nexstar Media Group; (WKYC-TV, LLC)
- Sister stations: Nexstar: WJW, WBNX-TV

History
- First air date: October 31, 1948
- Former call signs: WNBK (1948–1956); KYW-TV (1956–1965); WKYC-TV (1965–2009)
- Former channel numbers: Analog: 4 (VHF, 1948–1954), 3 (VHF, 1954–2009); Digital: 2 (VHF, 1999–2009), 17 (UHF, 2009–2019)
- Call sign meaning: Nod to previous KYW-TV call sign

Technical information
- Licensing authority: FCC
- Facility ID: 73195
- ERP: 1,000 kW
- HAAT: 307.1 m (1,008 ft)
- Transmitter coordinates: 41°23′9.9″N 81°41′20.7″W

Links
- Public license information: Public file; LMS
- Website: www.wkyc.com

WKYC (channel 3) is a television station in Cleveland, Ohio, United States, affiliated with NBC. It is owned by the Tegna subsidiary of Nexstar Media Group; Nexstar also owns Fox affiliate WJW (channel 8) and CW station WBNX-TV (channel 55). WKYC's studios are located on Tom Beres Way (a section of Lakeside Avenue in Downtown Cleveland named after the station's longtime political reporter who retired in 2016), and its transmitter is located in suburban Parma, Ohio.

== History ==
=== Early years ===
The station first signed on the air on October 31, 1948, as WNBK, broadcasting on VHF channel 4. It was the second television station in Cleveland to debut, ten months after WEWS-TV (channel 5), and was the fourth of NBC's five original owned-and-operated stations to sign on, three weeks after WNBQ in Chicago. WNBK was a sister station to WTAM radio (1100 AM), which had been owned by NBC since 1930. Although there was then no coaxial cable connection to New York City, AT&T had just installed a cable connection between WNBK, WNBQ, WSPD-TV in Toledo, KSTP-TV in St. Paul, Minnesota, and KSD-TV in St. Louis, creating NBC's Midwest Network. WNBK became one of the originators of programming for the regional network, along with WNBQ. Two days after signing on, on November 2, WNBK transmitted its coverage of the Truman/Dewey election results to the NBC Midwest Network. On January 11, 1949, WNBK began carrying NBC's New York-originated programming live via a cable connection to Philadelphia.

As a result of frequency reallocations resulting from the Federal Communications Commission's 1952 Sixth Report and Order, WNBK was moved to channel 3, swapping frequencies with fellow NBC affiliate WLWC in Columbus to alleviate same-channel interference with another NBC station, WWJ-TV across Lake Erie in Detroit. After construction was completed on the station's new transmitter in Parma, the channel switch took place on April 25, 1954.

=== The Westinghouse years ===
In May 1955, NBC traded WNBK and WTAM-AM-FM to Westinghouse Electric Corporation in return for KYW radio and WPTZ television in Philadelphia. Although Cleveland was a top-10 television and radio market at the time, NBC had long wanted to "trade up" its holdings to a larger market. Also, Philadelphia was the largest market in which it did not own a station. The swap became official on January 22, 1956, as NBC moved its operations (including much of its Cleveland staff) to Philadelphia, with WPTZ becoming WRCV-TV. Westinghouse took over the WNBK/WTAM operation and changed its call letters to KYW-AM-FM-TV on February 13, 1956. Westinghouse received a cross-station waiver from the FCC to own channel 3 since it has overlapping signals with Group W flagship KDKA-TV in Pittsburgh.

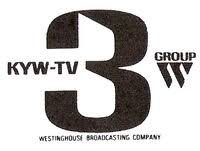
1960s logo as KYW

Despite its success in Cleveland, Westinghouse was not happy with how the 1956 trade with NBC played out. Almost as soon as the ink dried on the trade, the FCC and the U.S. Department of Justice launched an investigation, claiming NBC extorted and coerced them into agreeing to the deal. The investigators discovered that Group W had only agreed to the deal after NBC threatened to remove its affiliation from WPTZ (the present-day KYW-TV) and Westinghouse's other NBC affiliate, WBZ-TV in Boston, and to withhold a primary affiliation with newly purchased KDKA-TV, which ultimately affiliated with CBS despite its strong radio ties to NBC. In 1964, after an investigation that lasted eight years, the FCC ordered the swap to be reversed. NBC tried to appeal the decision, delaying the swap for one more year, but ultimately to no avail. Ironically, during the ordeal NBC was actually trying to sell its Philadelphia cluster it acquired from Westinghouse to RKO General in exchange for Boston cluster WNAC-AM-TV; NBC wouldn't own a station in Boston until purchasing WBTS-LD in 2016.

=== NBC returns ===
NBC re-assumed control of the Cleveland stations on June 19, 1965. Instead of restoring the previous WNBK and WTAM identities, the stations' new call letters became WKYC-AM-FM-TV, mostly as a nod to Westinghouse's stewardship of the stations. The AM station, for instance, had become a top 40 powerhouse under the moniker "KY11." WKYC-TV was separated from its sister stations in 1972, when NBC sold the WKYC radio stations to Ohio Communications. The AM station changed its calls to WWWE before restoring its historic WTAM calls in 1996, while the FM station became WWWM and then, in 1982, WMJI.

In a reverse of what took place in 1956, some radio and television staffers who worked for Westinghouse in Cleveland moved to Philadelphia along with the KYW call letters. This included news reporter Tom Snyder, news director Al Primo, and daytime talk show host Mike Douglas. Other Westinghouse employees—such as Linn Sheldon, Clay Conroy (who played Barnaby's sidekick "Woodrow the Woodsman" before getting a spinoff show of his own), and staff announcer Jay Miltner (who had been with the station since its inception in 1948)—remained in Cleveland. NBC also relocated many of their top Philadelphia radio and television executives and some on-air personalities to Cleveland, such as meteorologist Wally Kinnan. Kinnan's arrival displaced Dick Goddard, who had been with channel 3 since 1961. Goddard moved to Philadelphia with Westinghouse but returned to Cleveland in early 1966 and joined WJW-TV (channel 8). Evening sports anchor Jim Graner, who had joined the station in 1957 while also serving as the color commentator for the Cleveland Browns radio network, remained through the transition; he stayed on until his death in 1976. To this day, the Philadelphia stations insist they "moved" to Cleveland in 1956 and "returned" to Philadelphia in 1965 after the trade was voided.

At the same time, channel 3 enjoyed several technical advances with NBC's parent company, RCA (and after 1986, General Electric). It was Cleveland's first television station to broadcast full-time in color on September 13, 1965 (almost immediately after NBC regained channel 3 from Group W), the first to broadcast in stereo in 1985, and the first VHF station to closed caption its local newscasts for the hearing-impaired in 1990.

=== NBC cedes control to Multimedia, and then Gannett ===
After years of sagging ratings and continuing to be the lowest-rated of the network's owned and operated stations, NBC sold majority control of WKYC (51%) to Multimedia, Inc. in 1990. Due to its long ownership by NBC, to this day channel 3 is the only major station in Cleveland to have never changed its primary affiliation. At that time, Multimedia's entertainment division (now part of NBC's syndication arm) produced a number of syndicated daytime talk shows, and as a result Multimedia productions such as Jerry Springer (who himself had come from then-sister station WLWT in Cincinnati), Sally Jessy Raphael and Donahue ended up on WKYC's daily schedule. In 1993, the NBC peacock was dropped from the primary station logo, which italicized the numeral 3, was put in a square, and took a red-white-blue color scheme, though WKYC was still (and continued to be up until 2019) identified as "Channel 3" (the previous logo was a plain Helvetica "3" [also used 1976–84, as per NBC's nationwide branding for its O&Os], and was modified to become the logo today, after replacing the logo used 1984–91, an abstract, rectangular 3).

The Gannett Company purchased Multimedia on December 4, 1995. Under a December 1998 put-call agreement with NBC, Gannett increased its stake in WKYC-TV to 58% in April 1999 and to 64% in December 2000; it acquired the remaining 36% of the station from NBC in 2001. WKYC accomplished another first in Cleveland television history by becoming the first station in Northeast Ohio to broadcast in high-definition in 1999. Soon after Gannett bought full control of the station, it moved from its longtime studios in the former East Ohio Gas building on East Sixth Street in downtown Cleveland to its state-of-the-art Lakeside Avenue studio on the shores of Lake Erie, which Channel 3 refers to as its "digital broadcast center".

=== Tegna era ===
Last version of WKYC logo used from 2006 to 2019; the logo had been used in various forms since 1993.

On June 29, 2015, the Gannett Company split in two, with one side specializing in print media and the other side specializing in broadcast and home video media. WKYC was retained by the latter company, named Tegna.

On September 23, 2019, WKYC debuted a new logo ("circle 3" as seen above), began referring to their production operations as "WKYC Studios"—an umbrella brand encompassing their on-air and digital platforms, and began incorporating more lifestyle and human interest reports in their newscasts (under the branding of "3 News"); the station also now uses the "3" brand for general entertainment programming.

In January 2020, WKYC began a 5 p.m. newscast, bringing in former ESPN personality and Sandusky, Ohio, native Jay Crawford as a co-anchor. In September 2022, channel 3 moved Crawford to its newly established 4 p.m. newscast, and signed former CNN anchor and Bellevue, Ohio, native Christi Paul as a co-anchor at 5 p.m.

=== Sale to Nexstar ===
On August 19, 2025, Nexstar Media Group announced its purchase of Tegna Inc. for $6.2 billion. In Cleveland, Nexstar already owned WJW and WBNX-TV. The deal was completed on March 19, 2026, following approval by the FCC's Media Bureau for Nexstar to own more than two full-power station licenses in markets such as Cleveland. A temporary restraining order issued one week later by the U.S. District Court for the Eastern District of California, later escalated to a preliminary injunction, has prevented WKYC from being integrated into WJW and WBNX. Ohio Attorney General Dave Yost reached a deal with Nexstar on April 30, 2026, under which, if the injunction were to be lifted, Nexstar would maintain the existing local program output and editorially independent news departments between WJW and WKYC through 2030.

== Programming ==
=== Local programming ===
Under Westinghouse's ownership, KYW-TV launched Barnaby, a children's program which starred Linn Sheldon as the title character. The show premiered in 1956 and was an immediate hit, running on weekday afternoons for ten years. In 1961, channel 3 originated a local 90-minute weekday daytime variety talk show with former band singer Mike Douglas, which went up against WEWS' One O'Clock Club. Quickly eclipsing the competition, The Mike Douglas Show became so popular that Westinghouse decided to carry the program on its other stations in 1963, and eventually to syndicate the program nationwide. WKYC-TV continued to air The Mike Douglas Show for many years after both the host and the program moved to Philadelphia, where it remained until 1978. Westinghouse also took the Eyewitness News name and format with it from Cleveland to Philadelphia; it would later return to Cleveland, being used on WEWS from 1972 to 1990.

One show that made the jump from Philadelphia to Cleveland was the award-winning documentary series Montage, produced and directed by Dennis Goulden. This nationally acclaimed series of over 250 episodes investigated the issues and lifestyles of the Cleveland community during the 1960s and 1970s.

On July 1, 2011, WKYC became Cleveland's television outlet for the Ohio Lottery's daily drawings, as well as its Saturday night game show Cash Explosion; the rights returned to the lottery's former longtime broadcaster WEWS-TV (which had carried the drawings from the early 1970s until WKYC assumed the rights) on July 1, 2013.

=== Past programming preemptions and deferrals ===
Two NBC programs were notably excluded from the schedule of channel 3 under Westinghouse ownership: The Tonight Show, which was reformatted after original host Steve Allen's departure as the short-lived Tonight! America After Dark, was dropped by channel 3 in June 1957 and replaced with a late-night movie following the 11 p.m. newscast. NBC revived Tonight with Jack Paar as host in July of that year, but KYW-TV continued with its own programming, which also included the Westinghouse-produced-and-syndicated (new) Steve Allen, Regis Philbin, and Merv Griffin programs. The Paar-hosted Tonight Show would not be seen in Cleveland until October 1957, when NBC agreed to terms with WEWS to carry the program. KYW-TV also did not carry NBC's early-evening newscast, The Huntley-Brinkley Report, for exactly one year comprising the 1959-1960 television season. As with The Tonight Show, WEWS also ran this program. Also during this period, WFMJ-TV (channel 21) out of Youngstown was the nearest full-time NBC station to Cleveland. Many were able to receive WFMJ with a good antenna and UHF converter at that time. The Tonight Show returned to WKYC-TV's schedule in February 1966, after airing on WEWS during channel 3's Westinghouse years.

In March 2013, the station made national headlines when it preempted NBC's Thursday night sitcom lineup for two weeks with Matlock telefilms. Coming so shortly after it was announced about NBC's then sagging ratings, the decision was perceived to be a result of the lineup's poor performance, though WKYC's manager reminded many who had not noticed that the station has typically preempted the lineup for Matlock telefilms quite often for the past ten years (usually to provide "make good" ad slots for local advertisers whose pre-scheduled inventory was preempted by breaking news or sports coverage), and the move had nothing to do with ratings, and that NBC had begun to push new programming on those March evenings without much advance notice; WKYC had originally scheduled the films when it was expected the night would carry mainly encore programming.

Currently, the station's only preemptions outside of breaking news and weather situations are mainly for local sports, including a package of Cleveland Guardians games and over-the-air simulcasts of Cleveland Browns games from ESPN's Monday Night Football.

=== Sports programming ===
==== Cleveland Guardians ====
WKYC has served as the over-the-air home of Major League Baseball games involving the Cleveland Guardians since the 2006 season (when the team was called the Indians). The station significantly expanded its Guardians coverage during the 2025 season. WKYC will simulcast 10 Guardians games in 2025, up from two in 2024, and will air and produce a weekly Guardians focused show on Sunday nights.

WKYC previously provided studio operations for the regional sports network, then known as SportsTime Ohio—owned by the team itself until 2013—which aired the remainder of the team's games on cable and satellite and simulcast the games broadcast by WKYC. During this time, WKYC aired a weekly half-hour Indians-themed program, Indians Tonight, on Sundays at 11:35 p.m. Matt Underwood and former outfielder Rick Manning served as the announcing team for the Indians telecasts. All Indians games and other related programs were broadcast in high definition. In addition to Indians games produced in-house by channel 3, the station aired select Indians games through NBC's broadcast contract with MLB, first from its 1948 sign-on until 1989, and then for postseason games only from 1995 to 2000.

==== Cleveland Browns ====
With the Cleveland Browns' move to the newly formed American Football Conference after the completion of the AFL-NFL merger of 1970, channel 3, by way of NBC's rights to carry the AFC games, became the station of record for the team, replacing WJW in that role. This partnership would continue through 1995. Since 2006, Browns games are shown on channel 3 when the team plays on NBC's Sunday Night Football, and since 2019, in a simulcast with ESPN when the team plays on Monday Night Football.

For many years, the station has also partnered with the Browns to carry preseason games and coach's shows since then, outside of five seasons (including two short-lived season deals with WOIO in 1999 and 2004, the latter of which ended before the 2005 season due to team displeasure with the station's coverage of its ownership). WEWS carried the team's programming and preseason games from 2015 until 2018. The Browns returned to WKYC with the start of the 2019 regular season as part of a deal lasting through the 2021 season.

==== Cleveland Cavaliers ====
WKYC airs select Cleveland Cavaliers games broadcast through NBC's broadcast rights to the NBA from 1990 to 2002 and again beginning in 2025.

=== News operation ===
WKYC presently broadcasts 40 1/2 hours of locally produced newscasts each week (with 6 1/2 hours each weekday and four hours each on Saturdays and Sundays).

==== News department history ====
===== Early years and struggles =====
Under Westinghouse, the station debuted the country's first 90-minute local news block in 1959, called Eyewitness (a precursor to the Eyewitness News format).

For much of the time between NBC's repurchase of the station and the dawn of the 21st century, WKYC's news department was usually a very distant third in the ratings, well behind WJW-TV and WEWS. Part of the reason was that during most of its second stint as an NBC-owned station, it served mainly as a farm system for NBC, with almost no local talent. Given Cleveland's status as a mid-major television market, most of the promising reporters or anchors that NBC employed at WKYC could end up being promoted to other higher-profile NBC-owned outlets, especially New York City flagship WNBC-TV or WMAQ-TV in nearby Chicago. Many WKYC alumni went on to long and successful careers with NBC; most notably, current Today weather anchor Al Roker served as WKYC's chief weatherman from 1978 to 1983. As a result of this practice, turnover at channel 3 was very high, and it was unable to establish any real talent continuity. In contrast, its two major competitors, WJ(K)W and WEWS, both had long-established anchor teams who often stayed together for a decade or more. It was by far NBC's weakest owned-and-operated station.

From 1974 to 1984, WKYC tried to use the Action News branding several times while also using the music and graphics associated with the other NBC-owned stations, which employed the NewsCenter name. On March 19, 1984, the station dropped the Action 3 News name and adopted its current newscast moniker, Channel 3 News. WKYC also adopted a new logo and a new slogan called "Turn to 3"; the accompanying jingle was composed by Frank Gari. The "Turn to 3" jingle and image campaign was borrowed by many TV broadcasters around the world—most notably Detroit's WXYZ-TV. Various anchors—such as Virgil Dominic, Doug Adair, Mike Landess, Dave Patterson, Mona Scott, Judd Hambrick, Leon Bibb and Dick Feagler—set designs, and imaging campaigns were tried out, usually with little to no success.

Two of the few long-tenured personalities during this time included Joe Mosbrook and Del Donahoo. Both joined WKYC in 1967 (Donahoo from WOW in Omaha) and enjoyed long tenures at the station. Mosbrook retired in 2002, while Donahoo was co-host of Today in Cleveland with Tom Haley until 1997 and a feature reporter (under the "Del's Folks" banner) until 2006.

===== Turning the corner =====
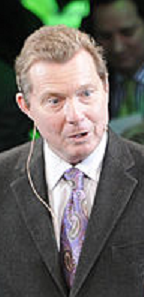
Longtime WKYC sports director/news anchor Jim Donovan

After NBC sold controlling interest in the station to Multimedia, the station tried to rebuild its news operation in the mid-1990s. They attempted this by putting more of an emphasis on local talent and continuity, using the tagline of "We're Building Our Station Around You" (complete with idents suggesting the slogan, by showing a physical logo for the station being sketched out, welded, painted and having the call-letters applied). Channel 3 even set up a telephone feedback hotline—dubbed "Talkback 3"—which was intended to field suggestions and comments from viewers about what they would like to see in the newscasts. Despite the more interactive approach, WKYC did not immediately reap any benefits coming from longtime CBS affiliate WJW's switch to (and eventual purchase by) Fox in 1994. However, ratings for WKYC's newscasts gradually began to improve towards the end of the decade. The station started to finish in first place in assorted time slots and posted some of the highest ratings books in the station's history.

In what was a somewhat controversial move, in September 1999, WKYC expanded its 6 p.m. newscast to one hour. This aggravated viewers because NBC Nightly News was pushed back from its long standing start time of 6:30 pm, down to 7 pm. This practice would be modified in July 2000 when Nightly News was moved back to its traditional 6:30 p.m. slot, and the second half-hour was used to start a 7 p.m. newscast, which continues to air.

WKYC finally became a factor in the Cleveland television news race in 2003, after it had picked up the then brand new Dr. Phil program and placed it in the 5 p.m. time slot. This move proved to be very successful since all of the other local major network affiliates were broadcasting news at 5 p.m. and this gave viewers an alternative; it also allowed WKYC to be able to get many viewers to change channels at the end of WEWS's 4 p.m. broadcast of The Oprah Winfrey Show so as to watch Dr. Phil (which was a spinoff of Oprah) at 5 p.m. (the syndication contracts for both shows disallowed them from airing against each other). During the broadcast of Dr. Phil, WKYC heavily promoted its 6 p.m. newscast, which began to experience sharp ratings increases, which then trickled down to the 7 p.m. newscast.

In early 2004, viewers began turning away from WJW and WEWS' hard-hitting newscasts to the more traditional WKYC. This helped channel 3 rise to first place in the news ratings for the first time in decades; all of its newscasts won their timeslots. WKYC even managed to push WJW's popular morning newscast into second place. This continued until May 2005, when WKYC made two major changes in their newscasts: the station had its reporters extend the length of their stories, hoping to provide more detail; in attempt to combat the common viewer complaint that "all news is bad", WKYC also started inserting more "positive" stories into their newscasts. The combination of the two resulted in less "hard" news, and resulted in a drop in viewership. Over the summer of 2005, while Dr. Phil was in repeats, WKYC lost the top spot at 6 p.m. to WEWS.

===== Finding success =====
Current standard WKYC logo.

The logo used by WKYC during Olympic years to promote NBC's Olympic coverage.

However, channel 3 retook the top spot in that slot during the November 2005 sweeps period. Additionally, despite fears due to a weakened NBC prime time schedule, WKYC retained its top spot at 11 p.m. which it has held for 17 straight ratings periods. In the February 2006 ratings period, WKYC continued its first place streak by placing first at 6 and 11 pm. Its morning newscast was second only to WJW's. On May 22, 2006, WKYC-TV became the second television station in the Cleveland market to begin broadcasting its local newscasts in high-definition. In the November 2006 ratings period, WKYC's airing of Dr. Phil continues to lead at 5 pm, and its 11 p.m. newscast held on to first place (though by a very slim margin over WOIO), although it slipped from first to third at 6 pm. It came in last place at noon (it was the only "Big Four" affiliate in Cleveland not to air a newscast at that time slot). Channel 3's late-afternoon and early-evening slump continued from then on, reaching its nadir in the February 2008 ratings period, when both Dr. Phil and the 6 p.m. newscast finished third behind WJW's and WEWS's newscasts.

Another reason for the sustained success was that channel 3 had a measure of stability at the anchor desk for the first time in decades. From 2000 to 2007, its weeknight news team consisted of Tim White and Romona Robinson, chief meteorologist Mark Nolan and sports director Jim Donovan. The long-standing team was broken up in 2007 when Nolan was reassigned to anchor the morning newscast, and weekend meteorologist Betsy Kling was promoted to weeknights. In December 2008, White's contract was allowed to lapse and Robinson anchored the 6 and 11 p.m. newscasts alone until her departure at the end of 2011.

Current managing editor and lead news anchor Russ Mitchell.

On January 3, 2011, WKYC expanded its weekday morning newscast by a half-hour, to 4:30 a.m. (WJW expanded its morning newscast into that timeslot on that same day). On January 16, 2012, former CBS News reporter/anchor Russ Mitchell became the new primary weeknight anchor and managing editor. On April 2, 2012, Kris Pickel became the new weeknight co-anchor with Mitchell at 6 and 11 p.m., marking a return of the traditional two-person anchor team at WKYC after three-plus years of solo anchors. In 2015, Pickel left WKYC and was replaced by Sara Shookman, who was previously a reporter/weekend morning anchor for channel 3.

On January 22, 2013, WKYC began using the AFD No. 10 broadcast flag to present its newscasts and other station programming in letterboxed widescreen for viewers watching on cable television through 4:3 television sets; this change accompanied the switch to Gannett's new standardized station graphics package.

On October 20, 2025, WKYC expanded its weekday afternoon newscasts from a half-hour to a full-hour, from noon to 1 p.m., which replaced a half-hour of weekday afternoon paid programming as well as the weekly Ultimate Cleveland Sports Show, which moved to a different timeslot. This move left WEWS-TV as the only station in the market to carry paid programming on weekday afternoons.

On November 10, 2025, former WEWS-TV meteorologist Mark Johnson joined WKYC.

==== Honors ====
A park on the east side of Cleveland was named for Helen Simpson, an advertising and promotions manager at WKYC, who was murdered in 1972 on her way home from work.

In 2016, after 37 years of serving as the station's political reporter, longtime channel 3 newsman Tom Beres announced his retirement after covering the election. The city of Cleveland then honored Beres by naming the section of Lakeside Avenue in front of the WKYC building "Tom Beres Way".

On May 10, 2021, channel 3 honored alumnus Al Roker—who was in Cleveland reporting on the city's reopening efforts following the COVID-19 pandemic—by naming the radar tower on top of the WKYC building the "Roker Tower", with WKYC chief meteorologist Betsy Kling presenting him a plaque to commemorate the occasion live on the Today Show.

On March 25, 2022, in recognition of his 50th anniversary as a TV newsman, the city of Cleveland renamed a section of Parkway Avenue on the east side of Cleveland "Leon Bibb Way". Bibb—who spent a good portion of his career at WKYC and was their senior reporter/commentator at the time of the dedication—had grown up in a home near the street.

==== Notable on-air staff ====
===== Current =====
- Leon Bibb – senior reporter and commentator
- Jay Crawford – news anchor
- Russ Mitchell – managing editor and lead news anchor
- Christi Paul – news anchor
- Mike Polk – feature reporter and contributor

===== Former =====
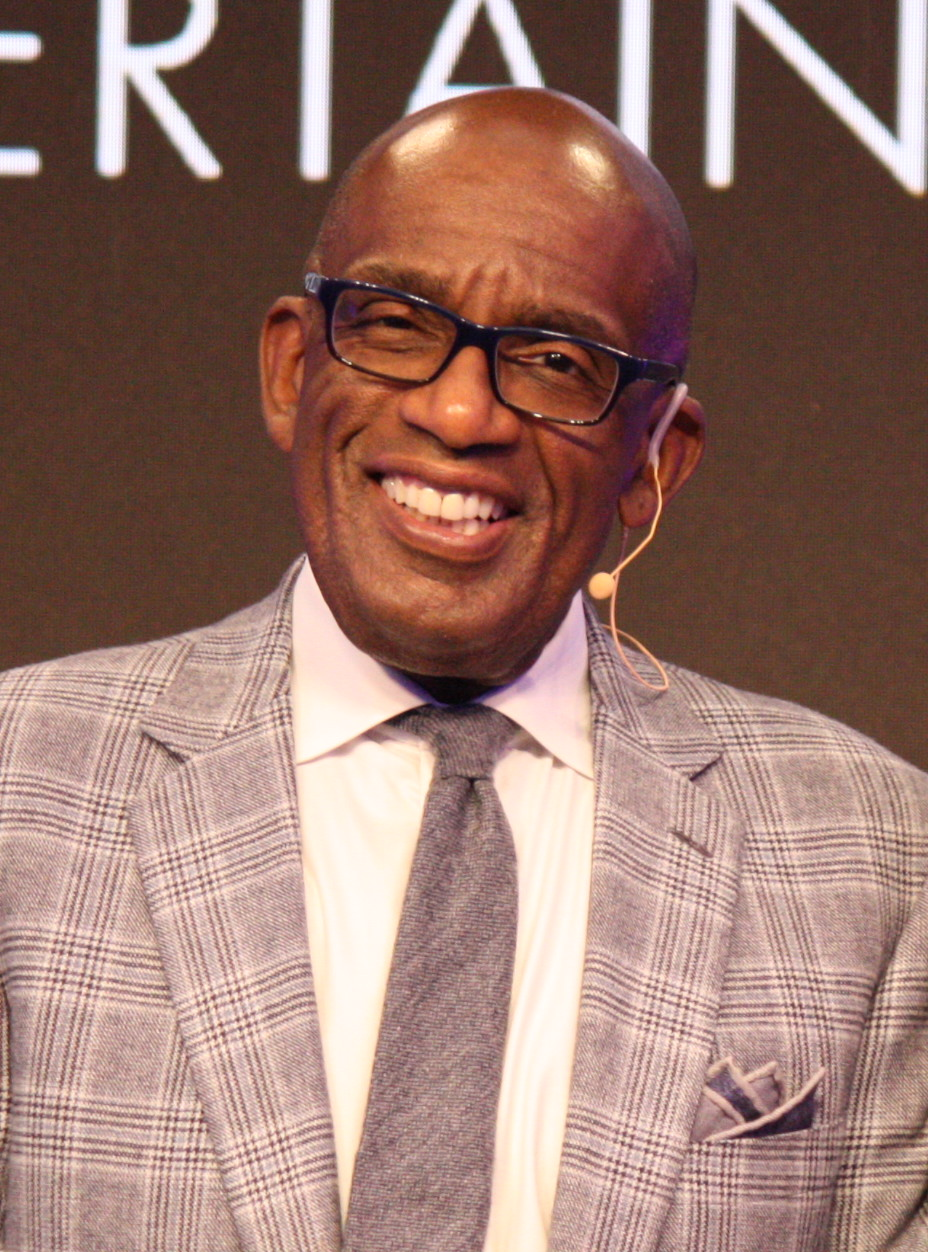
Former chief meteorologist Al Roker, whom channel 3 honored in 2021 by naming the radar tower on top of the WKYC building the "Roker Tower".

- Asa Aarons (consumer reporter)
- Doug Adair
- Roger Ailes
- Jim Bittermann
- Joe Castiglione
- Lisa Colagrossi
- Tim Conway
- Phil Donahue
- Jim Donovan (sports director and news anchor)
- Mike Douglas
- Doreen Gentzler
- Dick Goddard
- Jim Graner
- Kathryn Hahn (actress, was on children's show Hickory Hideout)
- Judd Hambrick
- Bill Jorgensen
- Wally Kinnan
- Fred McLeod
- Jay Miltner
- Carl Monday
- Al Primo
- Romona Robinson
- Al Roker
- Brian Ross
- Chuck Schodowski
- Linn Sheldon
- Charley Steiner
- Robin Swoboda
- Tim White

== Technical information ==
=== Subchannels ===
The station's signal is multiplexed:

Subchannels of WKYC
Subchannel	Res.	Short name	Programming
3.1	1080i	WKYC-HD	NBC
3.2	480i	Crime	True Crime Network
3.3	480i	COZI TV	Cozi TV
3.4	480i	Quest	Quest
3.5	480i	NEST	The Nest
3.6	480i	ShopLC	Shop LC
3.7	480i	QVC2	QVC2
55.5	480i	START	Start TV (WBNX-TV)

Broadcast on behalf of another station

=== Analog-to-digital conversion ===
WKYC ended regular programming its analog signal, over VHF channel 3, on June 12, 2009, the official date on which full-power television stations in the United States transitioned from analog to digital broadcasts under federal mandate. The station's digital signal remained on its pre-transition UHF channel 17, using virtual channel 3.

The "-TV" suffix was removed from the WKYC call sign on June 16, 2009. As part of the SAFER Act, WKYC kept its analog signal on the air until June 26 to inform viewers of the digital television transition through a loop of public service announcements from the National Association of Broadcasters.

== Coverage in Canada ==
When atmospheric conditions permit, WKYC's signal can be received as far away as Detroit and into Canada in Windsor and London, Ontario. WKYC was also carried on cable channel 3 in London prior to 1974, but was bumped to make room for Paris, Ontario's CKGN-TV as the flagship for the newly launched Global network of stations across Ontario. The station is readily available over-the-air to Kingsville, Leamington and Pelee Island, and was once one of the three Cleveland area stations carried on local cable providers in those three locations; WEWS and WJW were also available until 2000, when Cogeco displaced Shaw Cable as the cable provider for Essex County.

On October 16, 2009, the Windsor Star had notified readers that digital subchannels of the Detroit and Toledo stations would be added, while the Cleveland stations (such as WKYC) and some Toledo stations would have to be dropped from the listings to make room for them, starting with the next issue of the TV Times, released the next day. The only Cleveland local station remaining in the Windsor-area TV Times is WUAB.
