= Wally Kinnan =

Broadcast meteorologist and World War II hero

Henry Wallace Kinnan
- Born: March 7, 1919; Crooksville, Ohio, U.S.
- Died: November 22, 2002 (aged 83); Houston, Texas, U.S.
- Relatives: Lt Gen Timothy A. Kinnan; David E. Kinnan, Esq.
- Military career
- Allegiance: United States of America
- Branch: United States Army Air Forces; United States Air Force
- Service years: 1942–1953
- Rank: Captain
- Nickname: "The Weatherman"
- Units: 57 Strategic Reconnaissance; 59th Weather Wing; 429th Bombardment Squadron
- Conflicts: World War II; Sicily
- Awards: Purple Heart; Air Medal; Prisoner of War Medal
- Other work: Meteorologist, Television Personality, Weatherman

Henry Wallace Kinnan (March 7, 1919 – November 22, 2002) was an American decorated World War II hero, also was one of the first well-known U.S. pioneer television broadcast meteorologists. Kinnan held American Meteorological Society Television Seal #3. Kinnan, who also served in World War II as a B-17 bomber pilot and then an advanced weather officer attaining the rank of captain in the United States Air Force before resigning in March 1953 to enter broadcasting in Oklahoma.

== Personal and family background ==
Kinnan was born to David V. Kinnan and Hazel Hamer. He met his wife, the former Marjorie G. Ahrendt, at North High School in Columbus, Ohio, where they both attended. He has two sons, David E. Kinnan, Esq. and Timothy A. Kinnan. Both of his sons followed in his footsteps and joined the US Air Force. David was an Air Force JAG officer, and Tim went on to a full military career as a fighter pilot and general officer. Wally was a trumpet player with the Jimmy Dorsey Orchestra and Charlie Barnet during his undergraduate years at Ohio State out of love for music and as a way to help pay for school.

== Education ==
Kinnan attended North High School in Columbus, Ohio. After graduation he attended Ohio State University where he was a mechanical engineering undergraduate. He was a member of the Theta Tau fraternity and the Ohio State Football band. He left Ohio State to enlist in the United States Army Air Forces. He studied meteorology from 1947 to 1948 at Massachusetts Institute of Technology and took an advanced course in Tropical Meteorology in 1951 at the University of Chicago.

== Military service in World War II ==
Kinnan enlisted in the Air Corps on March 31, 1942, at Fort Hayes, Columbus, Ohio. He began flight training as an aviation cadet in September 1942 and was commissioned a second lieutenant upon graduation from pilot training on April 12, 1943. While in casual status at Luke Army Airfield he broke the fighter gunnery record. He initially trained to be a fighter pilot, however, the Air Corps needed bomber pilots and Kinnan, like many others, was reassigned to bombers. From there he went on to bomber transition and deployed overseas as a B-17 Flying Fortress pilot with the 429th Bombardment Squadron, 2nd Bomb Group, based at Massicault Airfield, Tunisia, as part of the Twelfth Air Force.

=== Combat pilot ===
Kinnan's aircraft was shot down over Eygalières, Vichy France on August 17, 1943. He sustained shrapnel injuries which were compounded when he bailed out too close to the ground and made hard impact. His injuries prevented him from attempting evasion and he was captured.

Kinnan's recount of his bail-out of his bomber aircraft was harrowing even in the telling. After taking fire that damaged the aircraft, alighting the #4 engine and wounding the other pilot; the crew immediately began bail-out procedures. Kinnan, the only pilot at the control yoke, maintained as much control of the aircraft as possible to ensure that his crew members were all safely out. Once they were out he put the aircraft into as stable a configuration that he could to maintain altitude and attitude. But the badly damaged aircraft, on fire, lost the right wing and continued to descend. In order to bail-out, Kinnan had to make his way to the nose hatch. However, the erratic flight of the damaged B-17 required him to crawl and pull himself along.

As Kinnan was crawling, his parachute caught on some part of the aircraft which left Wally in frantic state trying to unbind himself and his parachute from the rapidly descending aircraft. During this process he had unbuckled his parachute and was never able to put it back on properly. Finally able to free himself he launched himself from the airplane, up and out the normally facing downward hatch and pulled his parachute's ripcord.

Kinnan and M/Sgt Henry Petroski were the last two to exit, falling amidst the burning debris of their aircraft. Because he had not been able to properly restrap the parachute on, when it opened it twisted him up causing a severe back injury. This, plus the wounds he had sustained from the flak bursts while still in the aircraft made it impossible for him to evade capture once he was on the ground.

=== Prisoner of war ===
He was first taken to a hospital in Arles. Kinnan strongly credits his German captors in France with great humanity and care of his injuries. However, after just only over a week in France they transferred him to another hospital that was part of Dulag Luft near Frankfurt, where his treatment was much more stern. Once processed he was transferred to Stalag Luft III near Sagan, now Żagań in Poland, in mid-September 1943. The reality of the situation in the Stalag system was even more dire and cruel, where life often hinged on having enough to eat.

Kinnan persuaded the German captors to find some decent musical instruments so they could put on some organized musical programs. Kinnan and a group of Who's Who's of music that were all interred in German Camps founded a band called the Sagan Serenaders. Kinnan and Pilot Officer Leonard Whiteley of the British Royal Air Force organized and led the group. The Serenaders received donated musical instruments from aid organizations and whatsoever the German captors could scrounge up. One instrument was an unusual trombone that Wally described as a plumber's nightmare. They 'sacrificed' this instrument so that other POW's could turn it into a still. The 1963 motion picture The Great Escape, which greatly depicts some of the Serenders and Kinnan's experiences, showed a choir singing while the escape started but in actuality, it was the Serenaders. The Serenaders contributed to the effort regularly by practicing their instruments to mask the sound of digging.

Towards the end of the war as the Red Army were nearing Stalag Luft III, the Germans forced marched 12,000 prisoners to Stalag VII-A in Bavaria. When the German guards marched the prisoners, including the band members, out of the camp, some assumed they were being marched into a field for execution. However, the forced march proceeded through a blizzard to Spremberg almost 200 miles away. Many of the POWs died during the trek. Food was scarce and Bunch credited Kinnan with saving his life by sharing a potato. After the arrival of General George S. Patton's Third Army, on April 29, 1945, Kinnan and his fellow POWs in Stalag VII-A were liberated. Kinnan would then spend his processing time at Camp Lucky Strike before being sent stateside. Official records have initial capture date as August 17, 1943 with official repatriation to the United States as of June 30, 1945.

== Post-war service ==
After being repatriated, Kinnan attended the Massachusetts Institute of Technology (MIT) and received his degree in meteorology. After the creation of the United States Air Force in 1947, Kinnan became a USAF Weather Officer. During the Korean War, Kinnan served in weather service assignments on Kwajalein Atoll, Guam and Hawaii. While stationed at Tinker Air Force Base in Oklahoma City, Kinnan was a part of the Severe Storm Center of the Air Weather Service (AWS), headed by meteorologists Major Ernest J. Fawbush and Captain Robert C. Miller; Kinnan's team worked on development of methodology for tornado forecasting despite the AWS's belief that such a method could not exist.

Along with Francis K. Davis and Kenneth H. Jehn, Kinnan was one of the first three meteorologists to earn the American Meteorological Society's "Seal of Approval". Wally often told the story of how they drew straws to determine the order of who would receive the seal first; Kinnan was number 3, while Davis and Jehn were numbers 1 and 2, respectively.

== "Wally the Weatherman" ==
While still on active duty with the Air Force, Oklahoma City's WKY-TV hired Kinnan in February 1951 to host a nightly weather segment dubbed "Wally the Weatherman." Owing to his existing work with the Air Force and AWS, WKY-TV eventually teamed up Kinnan with fellow certified meteorologist Harry Volkman to form the first professional television weather department. Volkman's on-air broadcast of a tornado forecast on March 21, 1952—issued internally by the AWS but intercepted by WKY management—was an industry first and defied a federal ban on the practice of broadcasting severe weather information. Along with another on-air warning for a tornado that struck Meeker on May 1, 1954, but resulted in no fatalities, Kinnan and Volkman were largely credited for saving lives, and WKY-TV became the first television station to hold a contract with the National Weather Service.

Following Kinnan's 1953 discharge from the Air Force, his on-air work at WKY-TV increased, and he assumed Volkman's role as lead meteorologist in 1955. WKY-TV became the first television station to utilize a radar system, both with Will Rogers Field's weather radar and a converted military radar acquired by the station. Kinnan left WKY-TV in September 1958 for WRCV-TV in Philadelphia, which at the time was owned by NBC. A June 19, 1965, court-ordered reversal of a 1956 station asset swap between NBC and Westinghouse Broadcasting resulted in Kinnan's reassignment to WKYC-TV in Cleveland, displacing Dick Goddard, as Kinnan was under contract with the network and not the station. Kinnan worked alongside sports anchor Jim Graner at WKYC; later, from 1978 to 1980, he worked at station WTSP in Tampa.

He later went on to serve on the Board of the American Meteorological Society for Radio and Television Broadcasting and the Committee on Industrial Meteorology.

He was also the founding Director of the Franklin Institute Weather Center with Col. Robert C. Miller of the Fawbush-Miller Tornado team.

Kinnan died at the age of 83 of an aortic aneurysm on Friday, November 22, 2002, in Houston, Texas.

The Broadcast Pioneers of Philadelphia posthumously inducted Kinnan into their Hall of Fame in 2009.

== Flight information ==
- Rating: Pilot
- Flight hours: More than 1700
- Aircraft flown: A-26, AT-11, AT-6 AT-7, B-17, B-25, C-45, C-47, C-6, P-40, Vultee BT-13 "Vibrator", Stearman biplane, Cessna Skylane (N9392X), Beechcraft Debonaire (N9554Y)

== U.S. decorations and badges ==
- Air Medal
- American Campaign Medal
- Pilot
- European-African-Middle Eastern Campaign Medal with six battle stars.
- Honorable Service Lapel Pin
- National Defense Service Medal
- Prisoner of War Medal
- Purple Heart Medal
- World War II Victory Medal
