= Leon Bibb (newscaster) =

American journalist

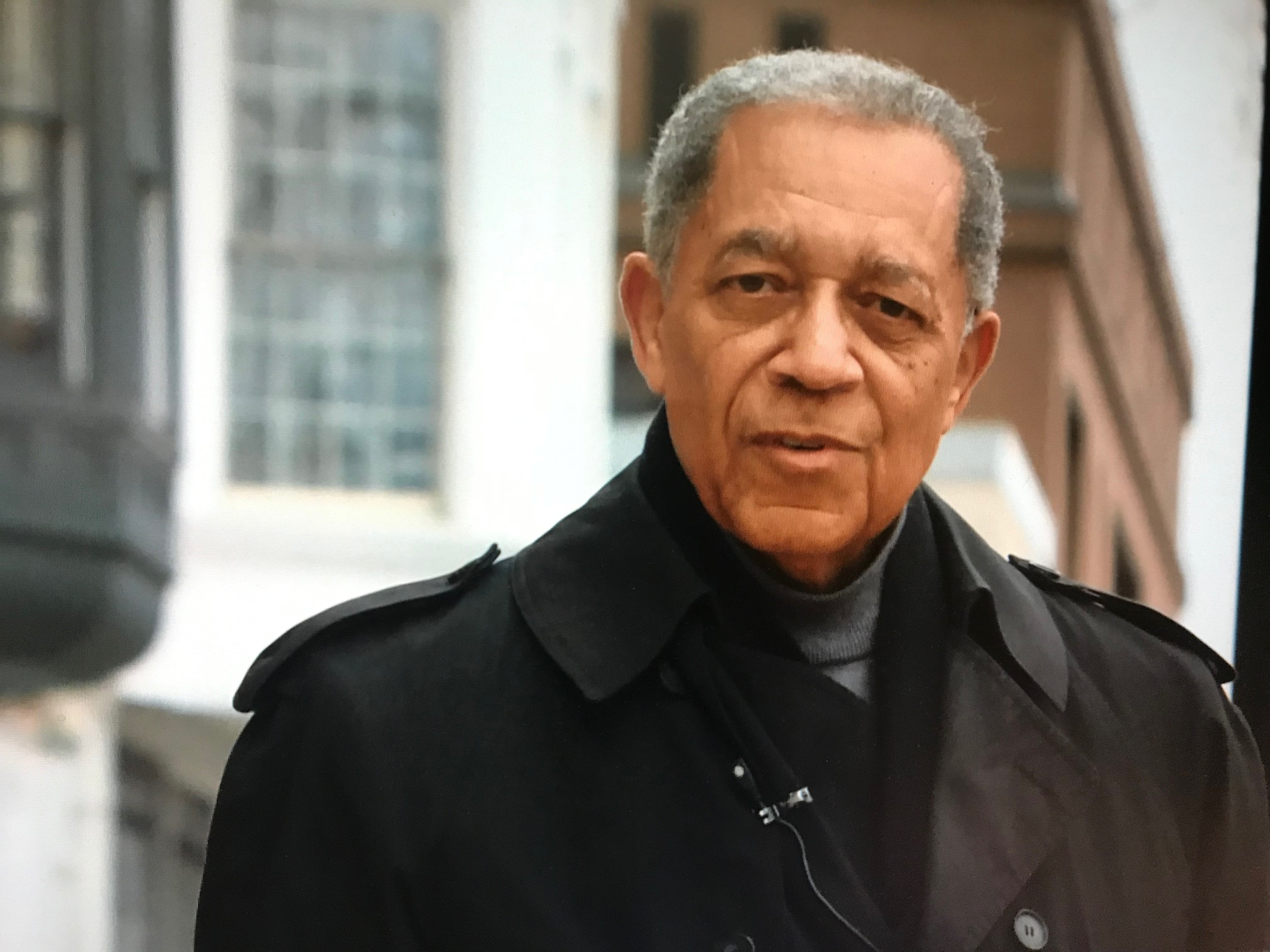
- Born: Leon Douglas Bibb; October 5, 1944 (age 81); Butler, Alabama, U.S.
- Occupations: television news anchor/ reporter, journalist, radio news anchor, television personality
- Years active: 1966–present
- Awards: Broadcaster's Hall of Fame; Bowling Green State University School of Communications Hall of Fame; Cleveland Press Club Distinguished Journalist award; Associated Press Ohio Broadcasters Hall of Fame; Cleveland Association of Broadcasters Hall of Fame

Leon Douglas Bibb (born October 5, 1944 in Butler, Alabama) is an American news anchor and commentator for WKYC in Cleveland, Ohio, and was a member of the BGSU Board of Trustees. Leon Bibb was the first African American primetime news anchor in Ohio.

== Life and career ==
Raised in Cleveland's Glenville neighborhood, Bibb graduated from Glenville High School.

From 1995 to 2017 Bibb anchored various newscasts at WEWS (most recently weekdays at noon) as well as hosting a Sunday morning show named Kaleidoscope, which focuses on urban issues in Cleveland. In the early 2000s, Bibb did a series called Our Hometown in which he focused on historical sites in the Cleveland area. He is known to take a camera operator to talk about a story in his own perspective, and such stories are now featured on WEWS under the title of "My Ohio".

Bibb retired from the anchor desk on August 1, 2017, but still appeared on WEWS hosting Kaleidoscope, as well as serving as a commentator during major news stories. He returned to WKYC-TV on August 6, 2018 to be a commentator and special feature reporter.

He is also a member of the Alpha Phi Alpha and Sigma Pi Phi fraternities as well as an active member of the Greater Cleveland Association of Black Journalists.

== Awards and honors ==
Journalism:

- Cleveland Press Club Distinguished Journalist Award

Television

- Lower Great Lakes Emmy Awards - Gold Circle Award (50 years in television)

Halls of Fame:

- Ohio Broadcasting Hall of Fame
- Glenville High School Hall of Fame
- Bowling Green State University School of Communications Hall of Fame
- Associated Press Ohio Broadcasters Hall of Fame
- Cleveland Association of Broadcasters Hall of Fame
- National Association of Black Journalists Hall of Fame
- Greater Cleveland Association of Black Journalists Hall of Fame 2025

State/Local:

- Section of Parkway Avenue on Cleveland's east side (where Bibb had grown up) renamed "Leon Bibb Way"
