= Charles W. Stage =

American politician and baseball umpire

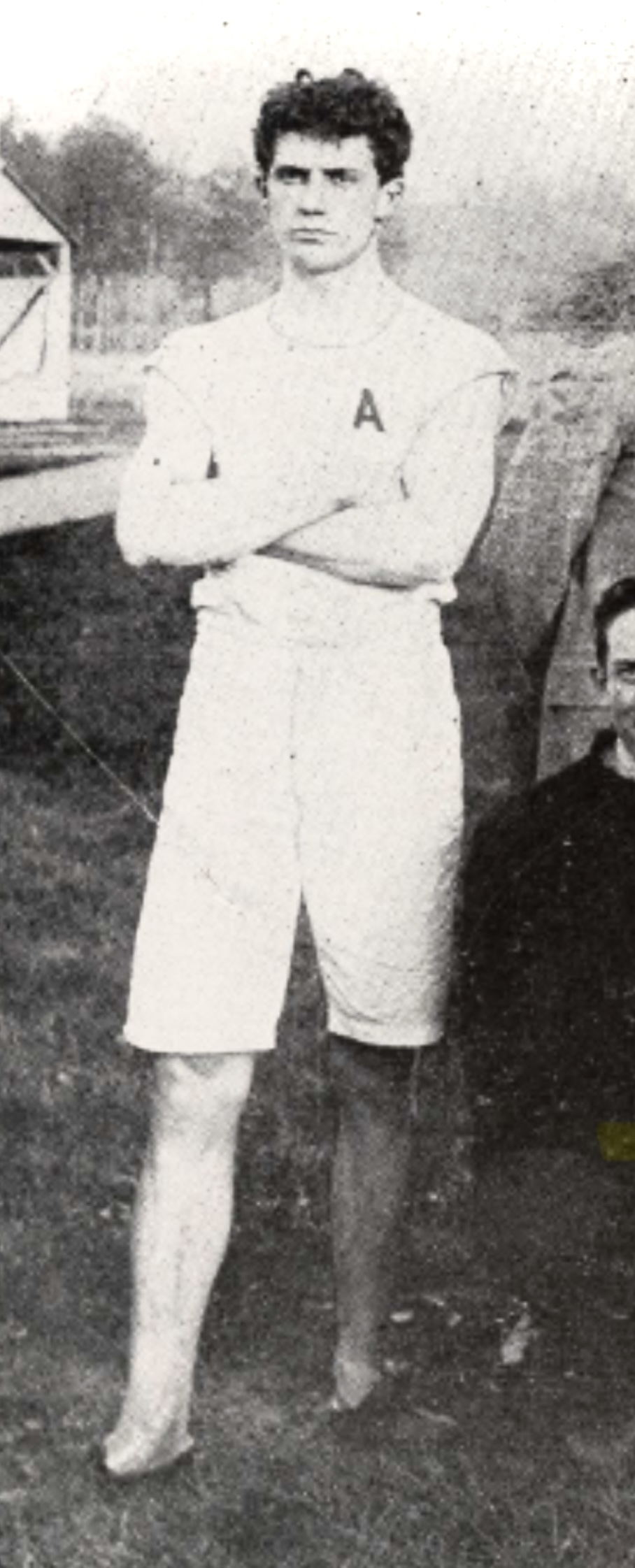

Ohio House of Representatives
- In office 1902–1903

Personal details
- Born: November 26, 1868 Painesville, Ohio, U.S.
- Died: May 17, 1946 (aged 77) Cleveland, Ohio, U.S.
- Party: Democratic Party
- Education: Adelbert College of Western Reserve (B.A., M.A.); Western Reserve School of Law (J.D.)
- Occupation: Attorney, baseball umpire

Charles Willard "Billy" Stage (November 26, 1868 – May 17, 1946) was an American attorney, politician, professional baseball umpire and amateur track athlete. A native of Painesville, Ohio, Stage attended Western Reserve University, where he tied an amateur world record in the 100-yard dash. After briefly becoming a National League baseball umpire in 1894, he finished law school and became a private practice attorney. Stage served in the Ohio House of Representatives in 1902–03 before returning to law practice.

In the early 20th century, Stage was an ally of Cleveland mayor Tom L. Johnson, and he held several local government posts. He was the Cuyahoga County Solicitor, ran the Municipal Traction Company, and served as Cleveland's public safety director and utilities director. His law practice largely consisted of representing railroad and real estate barons O. P. and M. J. Van Sweringen (known as the Van Sweringen brothers).

Stage was married to Miriam Kerruish, one of the first women to practice medicine in Cleveland. She died in the Cleveland Clinic fire of 1929. Stage retired after the Van Sweringen brothers lost their fortune in the Great Depression. He was sometimes known as Billy Stage, particularly in collegiate athletics and in baseball circles.

== Early life ==
Stage was born in Painesville, Ohio, the second of three sons of Stephen K. and Sarah (née Knight) Stage. His father was a butcher. Stage lived in Painesville his entire childhood, graduating from Painesville High School in 1888. Stage's parents were against his desire to go to college, so, at least in the beginning, he had to work to pay his tuition at Adelbert College of Western Reserve (later known as Case Western Reserve University). Still, he ran track, played baseball and captained the first varsity football team the college fielded.

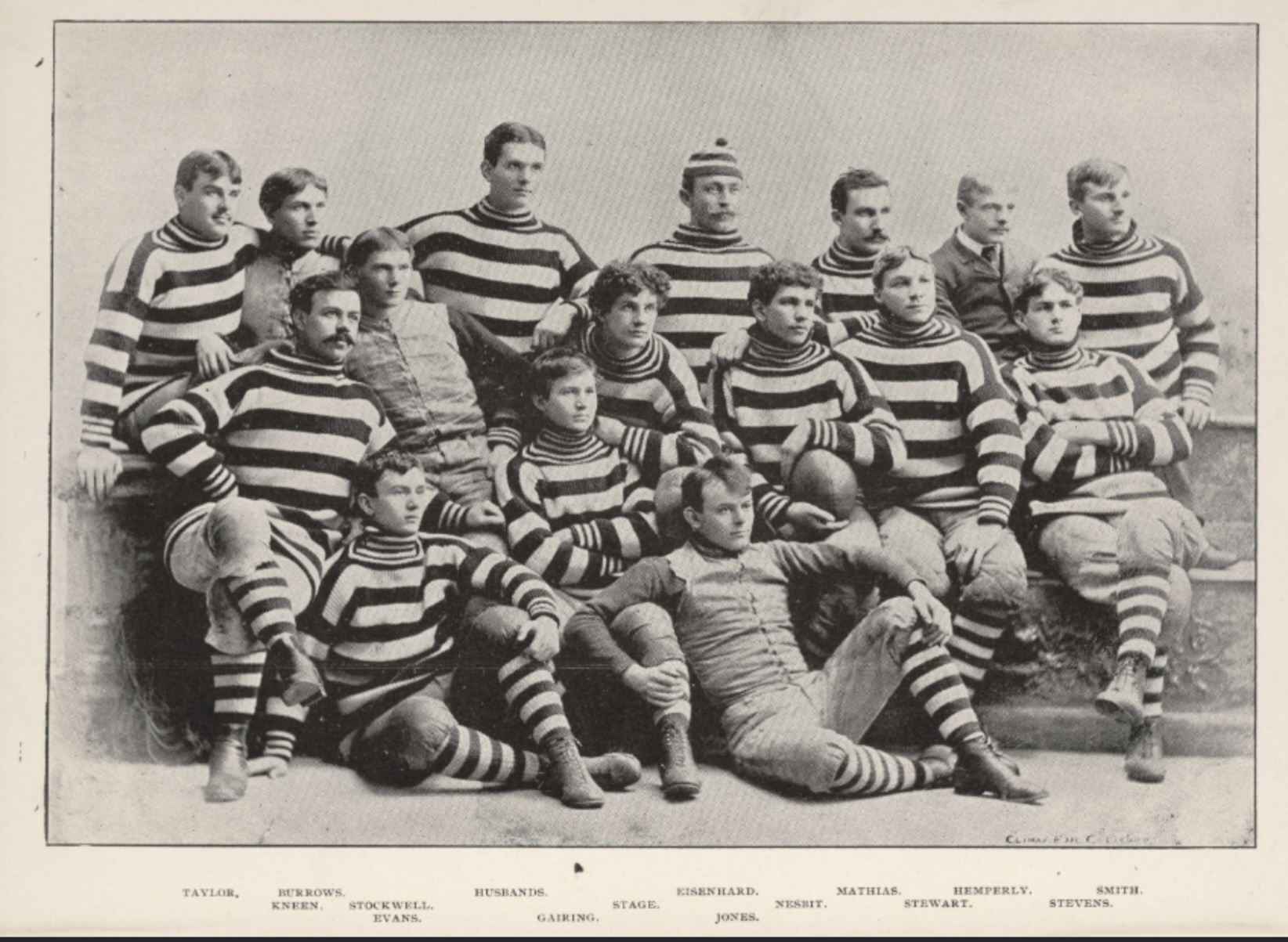
Stage shown with the 1892 Western Reserve football team.

At a field day hosted by Adelbert in 1890, Stage won seven events, and in six of those events he posted the best time of any college student in Ohio that year. He ran the 100-yard dash in 10.2 seconds. The Amateur Athletic Union (AAU) did not recognize athletic events at Western Reserve at the time Stage enrolled. Students from Adelbert sent telegrams to AAU officials asking them to allow Stage to enter an AAU meet to be held the following week, but the officials were not swayed, and a student from another school won the 100-yard dash with a time of 10.2 seconds. The New York Times was dismissive of Stage, calling him "a very promising amateur runner" but questioning the accuracy of his 100-yard dash time and saying that he had only trained for two weeks before the Adelbert field day.

Stage was first allowed to compete in AAU events in 1892, the year he finished an undergraduate degree. In September 1893, Stage was studying at the Western Reserve School of Law when he tied a world record by running the 100-yard dash in 9.8 seconds at an AAU event. Days later, he ran the 75-yard dash in 7.8 seconds, missing a world record by 0.2 seconds. Around this time, The New York Times advertised that it would award a gold medal for track excellence. When the paper's board of governors was unable to decide between Stage and a runner who had won two hurdling events, they cut the medal and presented half of it to each athlete.

== Umpiring career ==
In April 1894, Stage was still studying law when he was hired by the National League to serve as a professional baseball umpire. Early baseball umpires worked by themselves, and Stage's speed allowed him to get good views of plays anywhere on the field. Hughie Jennings, a player on the Baltimore Orioles, recalled that Stage might even slide next to a runner if he thought it would give him a better angle to make a close call. After his umpiring debut, The Pittsburgh Press noted that he offered "a relief from the usual lazy style of umpiring."

Umpires in that era, however, were often underappreciated; they faced threats of physical violence, and turnover was high. Cleveland Spiders manager Patsy Tebeau later described how players often ran after the umpire to attack him at the end of a game. He recalled that Stage's speed made him the most frustrating umpire to chase. "The whole team took after him time and again, but never once did he fail to get over the back fence ahead of us. We could never catch him. Finally I protested to President Young and Stage resigned," Tebeau said.

Stage dealt with unspecified illnesses several times that year, and whether or not Tebeau had a role in it, Stage cited poor health when he resigned in July 1894 after umpiring 45 games. Over the next year he returned to the field to umpire five times, all in Cleveland, but he did not umpire after 1895. Stage participated in a few AAU track events in the fall of 1895 before he was declared ineligible because of his prior work as a professional baseball umpire. He turned his attention to studying for the bar exam at that point.

== Law and public service ==
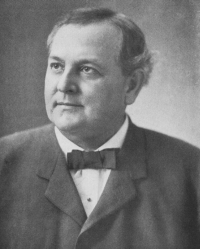
Cleveland mayor Tom L. Johnson (pictured) steered Stage into politics and introduced him to the Van Sweringen brothers, who became Stage's most prominent law clients.

After finishing law school in 1895, Stage opened a private law practice in Cleveland. He met Tom L. Johnson, mayor of Cleveland, and began to take an interest in city politics and in the Democratic Party. Through Johnson, Stage met the Cleveland siblings known as the Van Sweringen brothers, who became railroad barons. Stage became the attorney for the brothers, and this helped him make important contacts within politics and outside of it. In at least one case, Stage helped the brothers make a connection, facilitating their introduction to city solicitor Newton D. Baker, who became Cleveland's mayor and the United States Secretary of War.

In the first decade of the 20th century, the Van Sweringens were making plans to develop Shaker Heights, Ohio, a proposed garden community like the one found at Roland Park in Baltimore, and they had a politically diverse group of financial backers. Stage recalled that he was not convinced when he heard O. P. Van Sweringen's pitch the first time: "He was so doggone timid about the matter that when he left I remarked 'That young man will never make a real estate salesman.'" O. P. Van Sweringen later returned to Stage's office better prepared to make his case for the project. After spending several hours laying out his plans, he convinced Stage to become a financial supporter of the proposed development. The brothers established rail lines to the community and acquired other railroads in the process.

Stage served as a Democratic member of the Ohio House of Representatives in 1902 and 1903. In April 1902, Stage argued for the passage of a resolution that allowed Ohioans to vote on whether the governor should have veto power. The measure passed the House; it was approved by voters the following year, giving the Governor of Ohio the most extreme veto power in the United States.

After Stage left the Ohio House of Representatives, he served as general counsel, vice president and board member for the Cleveland Union Terminal (later known as Tower City Center). He was on the boards of directors for entities including the Vaness Company, Cleveland Interurban Railroad, and the Cleveland Traction Terminals Company. He was also a close advisor to Mayor Johnson and served as Cuyahoga County Solicitor and director of the Municipal Traction Company, which was the holding company for the Cleveland railway system. Stage left city politics after Johnson did not win re-election in 1909, but he returned to city service under a Democratic mayor in 1911, taking a post as Cleveland's director of public safety and then as the first city utilities director.

Shaker Heights survives as a community, but the Van Sweringen brothers lost most of their holdings in 1935, when they defaulted on loans totaling $48 million (equivalent to $1.13 billion today) as a result of the Wall Street Crash of 1929.

== Personal life ==
In 1903, Stage married a physician, Miriam Gertrude Kerruish, and they had four children: Charles Jr, William, Miriam and Edward. Kerruish practiced as an obstetrician and pediatrician, and many of her patients were indigent. She was one of the first women to practice medicine in Cleveland and was the first woman credentialed to practice at Cleveland City Hospital. Kerruish's father William was the son of immigrants from the Isle of Man and, like Stage, had worked his way through Western Reserve to become a lawyer. Miriam Kerruish's brother, Sheldon Quayle Kerruish, was also an attorney.

Miriam Kerruish was also active in civic organizations. She helped organize the Women’s Protective Association of Cleveland and was on the board of trustees of the Woman’s Hospital and the Maternity Hospital Council. She died in the Cleveland Clinic fire of 1929.

== Later life ==
A few years after his wife's death, Stage inherited a large tract of land from the Kerruish family in what is now known as Cleveland's Lee–Miles neighborhood. Stage donated the land to the city and Kerruish Park was established.

Stage retired when the Van Sweringen brothers lost their holdings during the Great Depression. He died in 1946, never having remarried.
