= Pete Jenkins =

American football player and coach (born 1941)

Biographical details
- Born: August 27, 1941 (age 85); Macon, Georgia, U.S.

Playing career
- 1961–1964: Western Carolina

Coaching career (HC unless noted)
- 1964–1965: Warner Robins HS (GA) (assistant)
- 1965–1967: Baker HS (GA) (assistant)
- 1967–1968: Phenix City HS (AL)
- 1968–1970: Troy State (DC)
- 1971–1972: Florence State (DC)
- 1973–1974: South Carolina (DE)
- 1975–1977: Southern Miss (DC)
- 1978: Oklahoma State (DL)
- 1979: Florida (DL)
- 1980–1981: LSU (AHC/DL)
- 1982: LSU (AHC/DC/DL)
- 1983–1984: LSU (AHC/DL)
- 1985–1986: LSU (DL)
- 1987–1989: LSU (DC/DL)
- 1990: LSU (AHC/DL)
- 1991–1995: Mississippi State (DL)
- 1996–1998: Auburn (DL)
- 2000–2001: LSU (DL)
- 2007–2009: Philadelphia Eagles (DL)
- 2013: USC (DL)
- 2016–2017: LSU (DL)
- 2023: LSU (DL)

Pete Jenkins (born August 27, 1941) is an American former football coach and player. His coaching career spanned a 54-year period from 1964 to 2017 at the high school, college and professional level. Having mentored numerous NFL and college defensive line coaches, Jenkins is credited with revolutionizing the way the position is taught and coached and revered as one of the greatest defensive line coaches in football history. He spent a total of 22 seasons in the Southeastern Conference (SEC) and three in the National Football League (NFL). Jenkins coached in 14 bowl games and was part of two NFL playoff team appearances. He also sent over 30 players that he coached in college to the NFL.

== Playing career ==
Jenkins played football at Western Carolina University from 1961 to 1964.

== Coaching career ==
=== High School coaching career ===
Jenkins began his coaching career in 1964 as an assistant coach at Warner Robins High School in Warner Robins, Georgia and was also an assistant coach at Baker High School in Columbus, Georgia. From 1967 to 1968, he was head coach at Phenix City High School in Phenix City, Alabama.

=== College coaching career ===
In 1968, Jenkins moved to the college coaching ranks as the defensive coordinator at Troy State University from 1968 to 1970. While at Troy State, the team won the 1968 NAIA Football National Championship. Jenkins then moved to the University of North Alabama and was defensive coordinator from 1971 to 1972.

In 1973, Jenkins made the jump to NCAA Division I football as the defensive end coach at the University of South Carolina until 1974. From 1975 to 1977, Jenkins was the defensive coordinator at the University of Southern Mississippi and in 1978 became the defensive line coach at Oklahoma State University. In 1979, Jenkins became a coach in the Southeastern Conference for the first time as the defensive line coach at the University of Florida.

In 1980, Jenkins moved to the university where he would spend the majority of his career. He became the defensive line coach and assistant head coach at Louisiana State University (LSU) from 1980 to 1981. For the 1982 season, he added the responsibility of being the defensive coordinator. From 1983 to 1986, he was the defensive line coach and some years the assistant head coach. Starting in 1987, he once again became defensive coordinator/defensive line coach through the 1989 season. In 1990, he was the defensive line coach/assistant head coach.

From 1991 to 1995, Jenkins was the defensive line coach at Mississippi State University and at Auburn University from 1996 to 1998. In 2000, LSU head coach Nick Saban brought Jenkins back as defensive line coach through the 2001 season. During the 2013 season, Jenkins was hired by interim head coach Ed Orgeron to coach the defensive line at USC. From 2016 to 2017, Jenkins returned to LSU for the final time as the defensive line coach. He was spotted at the Alabama Crimson Tide's football practice on August 7, 2019.

=== Professional coaching career ===
For the 2007 season, Jenkins moved into professional football as the defensive line coach for the NFL Philadelphia Eagles. He coached the defensive line for the team through the 2009 season. The Eagles made the playoffs twice during Jenkins tenure as defensive line coach.

== Personal life ==
Jenkins is married to the former Donna Reece and has two children, Jennifer and Jeff. He attended Hawkinsville High School in Hawkinsville, Georgia. After retiring from coaching full time in 2018, Jenkins continues to consult coaching staffs across the country. Jenkins also serves as an off-season trainer for Current NFL players as well as NFL Draft prospects.
