= SS Newton D. Baker =

Liberty ship of WWII

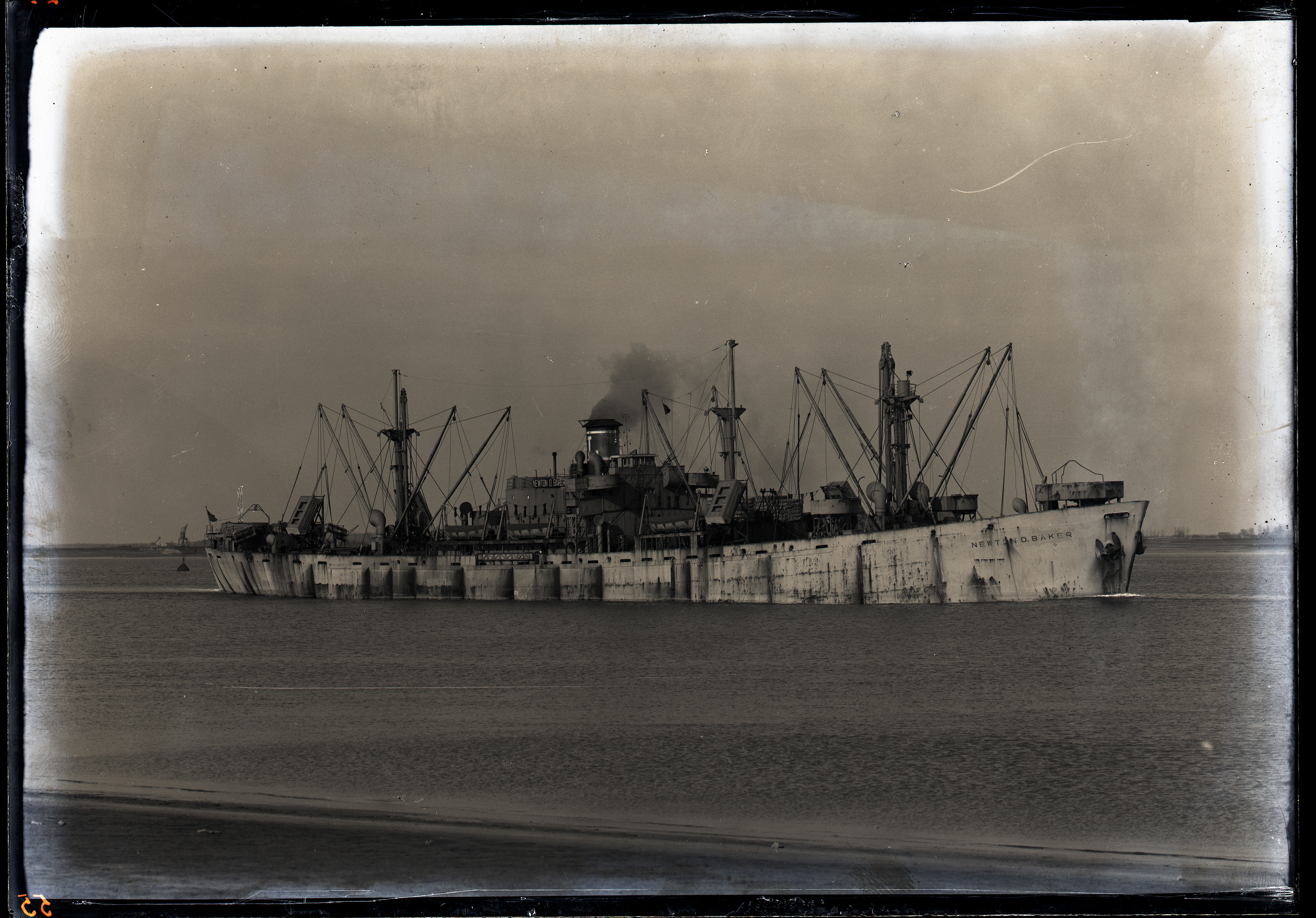
- Newton D. Baker, probably in the Scheldt

History

United States
- Name: Newton D. Baker
- Namesake: Newton D. Baker
- Owner: War Shipping Administration (WSA)
- Operator: Luckenbach Steamship Co., Inc.
- Ordered: as type (EC2-S-C1) hull, MC hull 1520
- Builder: J.A. Jones Construction, Panama City, Florida
- Cost: $2,258,166
- Yard number: 2
- Way number: 2
- Laid down: 3 September 1942
- Launched: 25 February 1943
- Sponsored by: Rose Jones
- Completed: 6 April 1943
- Identification: US official number 243063; Call sign KIFC
- Fate: Laid up in the National Defense Reserve Fleet, Mobile, Alabama, 1 October 1947; Sold for scrapping, 2 January 1968

General characteristics
- Class & type: Liberty ship; type EC2-S-C1, standard
- Tonnage: 10,865 LT DWT; 7,176 GRT
- Displacement: 3,380 long tons (3,434 t) (light); 14,245 long tons (14,474 t) (max)
- Length: 441 feet 6 inches (135 m) oa; 416 feet (127 m) pp; 427 feet (130 m) lwl
- Beam: 57 feet (17 m)
- Draft: 27 ft 9.25 in (8.4646 m)
- Installed power: 2 × Oil fired 450 °F (232 °C) boilers, operating at 220 psi (1,500 kPa); 2,500 hp (1,900 kW)
- Propulsion: 1 × triple-expansion steam engine, (manufactured by General Machinery Corp., Hamilton, Ohio); 1 × screw propeller
- Speed: 11.5 knots (21.3 km/h; 13.2 mph)
- Capacity: 562,608 cubic feet (15,931 m^{3}) (grain); 499,573 cubic feet (14,146 m^{3}) (bale)
- Complement: 38–62 USMM; 21–40 USNAG
- Armament: Varied by ship; Bow-mounted 3-inch (76 mm)/50-caliber gun; Stern-mounted 4-inch (102 mm)/50-caliber gun; 2–8 × single 20-millimeter (0.79 in) Oerlikon anti-aircraft (AA) cannons and/or, 2–8 × 37-millimeter (1.46 in) M1 AA guns

SS Newton D. Baker was a Liberty ship built in the United States during World War II. She was named after Newton D. Baker, a lawyer, the 37th Mayor of Cleveland, and the United States Secretary of War, during World War I.

== Construction ==
Newton D. Baker was laid down on 3 September 1942, under a United States Maritime Commission (MARCOM) contract, MC hull 1520, by J.A. Jones Construction, Panama City, Florida; sponsored by Rose Jones, the wife of the James Addison Jones, the founder J.A. Jones Construction Co., she was launched on 25 February 1943.

== History ==
She was allocated to Luckenbach Steamship Co., Inc., on 6 April 1943. On 1 October 1947, she was laid up in the National Defense Reserve Fleet, Mobile, Alabama. On 2 January 1968, she was sold for $46,320 to Union Minerals and Alloys Corporation, to be scrapped. She was removed from the fleet on 29 January 1968.

== Bibliography ==
- "Jones Construction, Panama City FL". ShipbuildingHistory.com. 13 October 2010.
- Maritime Administration. "Newton D. Baker". Ship History Database Vessel Status Card. U.S. Department of Transportation, Maritime Administration.
- Davies, James (May 2004). "Specifications (As-Built)" (PDF). p. 23.
- "SS Newton D. Baker".
