= Donald R. Johnston =

United States Army soldier

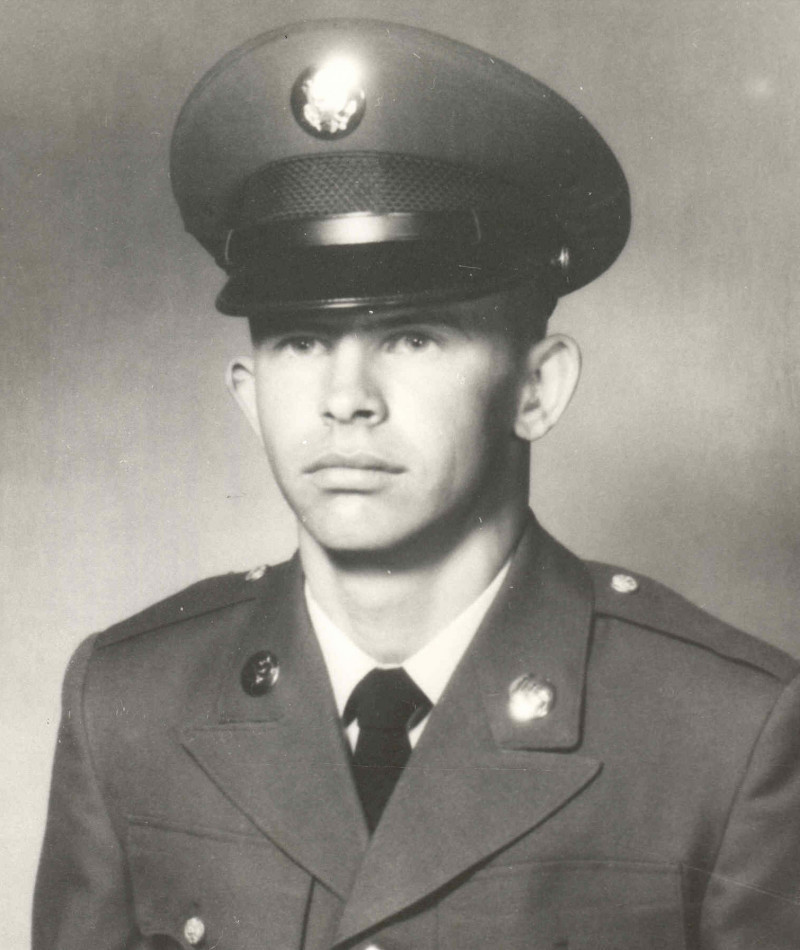
- Born: Donald Ray Johnston; November 19, 1947; Columbus, Georgia, US
- Died: March 21, 1969 (aged 21); Tay Ninh Province, Republic of Vietnam
- Burial place: Fort Benning Post Cemetery, Georgia
- Military career
- Allegiance: United States
- Branch: United States Army
- Service years: 1968–1969
- Rank: Specialist Four
- Units: 8th Cavalry Regiment, 1st Cavalry Division
- Conflicts: Vietnam War †
- Awards: Medal of Honor

Donald Ray Johnston (November 19, 1947 – March 21, 1969) was a United States Army soldier and a recipient of the United States military's highest decoration—the Medal of Honor—for his actions in the Vietnam War.

== Biography ==
After graduating from Baker High School, Johnston joined the Army from his birth city of Columbus, Georgia in 1968. By March 21, 1969, was serving as a specialist four in Company D, 1st Battalion, 8th Cavalry Regiment, 1st Cavalry Division. On that day, in Tay Ninh Province, Republic of Vietnam, during Operation Toan Thang III Johnston smothered the blasts of three enemy-thrown explosives with his body, sacrificing his life to protect those around him.

Johnston, aged 21 at his death, was buried at the Fort Benning Post Cemetery in Georgia.

For his heroism, the main recruit processing building at the 30th Adjutant General in Fort Benning is named after him.

== Medal of Honor ==
Specialist Johnston's official Medal of Honor citation reads:

For conspicuous gallantry and intrepidity in action at the risk of his life above and beyond the call of duty. Sp4 Johnston distinguished himself while serving as a mortarman with Company D, at a fire support base in Tay Ninh Province. Sp4 Johnston's company was in defensive positions when it came under a devastating rocket and mortar attack. Under cover of the bombardment, enemy sappers broke through the defensive perimeter and began hurling explosive charges into the main defensive bunkers. Sp4 Johnston and 6 of his comrades had moved from their exposed positions to 1 of the bunkers to continue their fight against the enemy attackers. As they were firing from the bunker, an enemy soldier threw 3 explosive charges into their position. Sensing the danger to his comrades, Sp4 Johnston, with complete disregard for his safety, hurled himself onto the explosive charges, smothering the detonations with his body and shielding his fellow soldiers from the blast. His heroic action saved the lives of 6 of his comrades. Sp4 Johnston's concern for his fellow men at the cost of his life were in the highest traditions of the military service and reflect great credit upon himself, his unit, and the U.S. Army.

== See also ==
- List of Medal of Honor recipients
- List of Medal of Honor recipients for the Vietnam War
