= 1901 Cleveland mayoral election =

Cleveland mayoral election, 1901
Mayor before election
John H. Farley
Democratic
Elected mayor
Tom L. Johnson
Democratic

The 1901 Cleveland mayoral election saw the election of Tom L. Johnson by a very large margin. Johnson ran on a pro-municipal ownership and tax reform platform.
