= Herman C. Baehr =

American politician

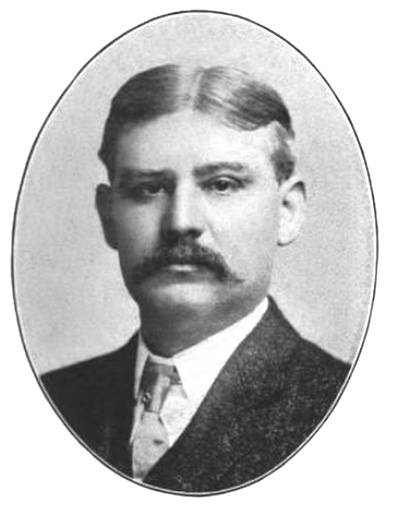

36th Mayor of Cleveland
- In office 1910–1911
- Preceded by: Tom L. Johnson
- Succeeded by: Newton D. Baker

Personal details
- Born: Herman Carl Baehr; March 16, 1866; Keokuk, Iowa, U.S.
- Died: February 4, 1942 (aged 75); Los Angeles, California, U.S.
- Political party: Republican
- Spouse: Rose E. Schulte (m. 1898)

Herman C. Baehr (March 16, 1866 – February 4, 1942) was an American politician of the Republican Party who served as the 36th mayor of Cleveland, Ohio, from 1910 to 1911.

== Life and career ==
Born in Keokuk, Iowa, Baehr was the son of Jacob and Magdalena Zipf Baehr, both of whom had earlier lived in Cleveland from 1850 to 1862. The family returned to the city after the American Civil War. Baehr was educated in public schools, but left at age 14 to pursue a career in his father's brewing company. An ethnic German, he resumed his education abroad and attended Lehman's Scientific Academy in Worms, Germany. Returning to the U.S., he graduated from the First Scientific Station of New York in 1887, and received a Bachelor of Medicine degree. When he returned to Cleveland, Baehr took up an official position at his father's Baehr Brewing Company. After Baehr Brewing was taken over by Cleveland-Sandusky Brewing Corporation, he assumed the post of secretary and treasurer for that company.

Baehr became interested in Republican politics and eventually met Mark Hanna. His friendship with Hanna sparked a second career in politics. In 1903, at Hanna's urging Baehr ran for and was elected County Recorder. Hanna died the following year, and local GOP looked to Baehr to run against Tom L. Johnson for the city's mayor.

In 1909, Baehr ran a solid election against Johnson, with support from Millionaire's Row and the recent influx of German immigrants who were drawn to Baehr's German ancestry. He finally defeated Johnson, in what many see as the greatest upset in Cleveland politics. Although he was heavily criticized by the press, Baehr's tenure as mayor was relatively efficient. He restored conservative fiscal policies, oversaw further downtown development, and carried through with Johnson's idea of a three-cent fare. In 1912, he stepped down as mayor and instead became the first vice-president and director of the Forest City Savings and Trust Company.

== Personal life and death ==
Baehr married Rose E. Schulte of Cleveland on April 22, 1898.

In retirement, Baehr spent winters at a home in Los Angeles, California. He died there suddenly of a stroke on February 4, 1942. His wife, Rose, was in ill health and could not immediately transport his remains to Cleveland for burial. Baehr was interred at Forest Lawn Memorial Park in Glendale, California. Rose Baehr died in Los Angeles in 1956, having never moved her husband's remains to Cleveland. She was interred next to him at Forest Lawn.

Political offices
| Preceded by Tom L. Johnson | Mayor of Cleveland; 1910–1911 | Succeeded by Newton D. Baker |
