= Cleveland Traction Wars =

American political conflict in Cleveland, Ohio, during the early 20th century

Newspaper notice placed by Tom L. Johnson in March 1902

The Cleveland Traction Wars was a political conflict in Cleveland, Ohio, which surrounded the question of whether or not municipal ownership would be applied to the city's streetcar system. It was a key issue during the mayoralty of Tom L. Johnson from 1901 to 1909. This was one of many issues on which Mayor Johnson, a Democrat and a proponent of municipal ownership, and Senator Mark Hanna, a Republican, came into conflict.

== Background ==
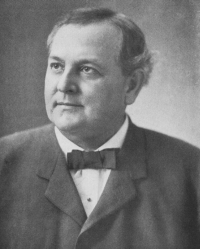
Mayor Johnson

Tom L. Johnson was elected mayor of Cleveland in 1901 as a proponent of municipal ownership. One of his campaign slogans had pertained to the operation of streetcars, proclaiming to champion, "three cent fares and universal transfers".

During his tenure, Johnson oversaw the city takeovers of such services as garbage collection, street cleaning, and street lighting. He believed that streetcar services should also become a public utility rather than continuing as a private enterprise.

== Conflict ==
Senator Mark Hanna

A conflict arose around what terms the city would agree to extend streetcar franchises.

Johnson's push for municipal ownership of the city's streetcars and power plants roused resistance. Although Johnson was blocked by state law from creating a municipal system, he arranged for the creation of a holding company to run city streetcars. Johnson believed that a three-cent fare could be implemented, replacing the five-cent fare. After the 1903 merger of the city's two streetcar companies (one being owned by Mark Hanna), Johnson's determination for municipal ownership strengthened.

Johnson won reelection by again campaigning on the issue of a three-cent fare in 1907.

In 1908, the private streetcar company reached an agreement to lease their properties to a city-run traction company, to be controlled by a five-person board appointed by the mayor. Negotiations which reached this arrangement had been taking place since 1907.

The company became plagued with problems. Dissatisfied voters voted against a referendum to pass an ordinance that would have provided city backing to the bonds of the municipal traction company. Failing to raise funds, the municipal company returned the properties to their private owners.

Robert Walker Tayler was brought in as an arbitrator to help resolve the conflict between streetcar company and the city.

== See also ==
- History of Cleveland
- Transportation in Cleveland
- Chicago Traction Wars
