= Augustus Raymond Hatton =

American politician

Augustus Raymond Hatton (September 27, 1873 - November 12, 1946) was an American politician in Cleveland, Ohio. He served as a Cleveland City Council member and professor of Political science at Western Reserve University. Hatton was campaign manager for the city manager plan which took effect in 1924.

== Early life and education ==
Hatton was born near Vevay, Indiana to Augustus and Mary Lavinia (Howard) Hatton. Augustus graduated from Franklin College (Indiana) with a Bachelor of Philosophy then taught history and political science there. He got a Ph.D. from the University of Chicago. Then he was associate professor of political science at Western Reserve University. From 1927 to 1940, Hatton taught at Northwestern University. Hatton was a visiting professor at the University of Texas in Austin 1942–43.

== Cleveland politics ==
He and Newton D. Baker helped draft Ohio's home rule amendment. Then he served on Cleveland's Charter Commission and drafted the proportional representation section of Cleveland's city manager plan adopted in 1921. Hatton was elected to Cleveland City Council.

== Personal life ==
Hatton married Nancy Mathews on November 11, 1903 and they had a daughter Martha. After Nancy's death in 1931, he married Esther Rutan on November 25, 1936.
