= Newton D. Baker =

American politician (1871–1937)

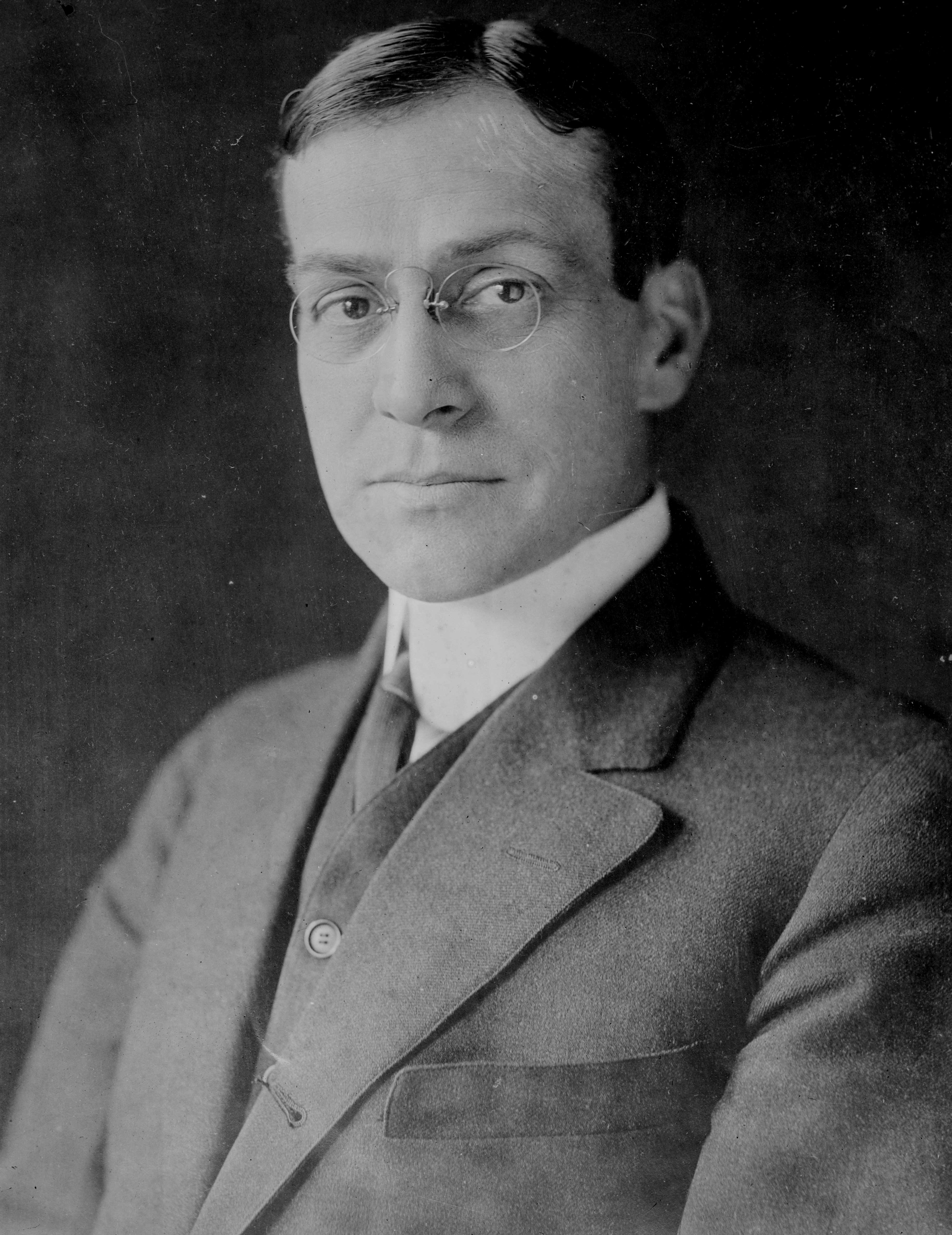
- Baker c. 1910s

47th United States Secretary of War
- In office March 9, 1916 – March 4, 1921
- President: Woodrow Wilson
- Preceded by: Lindley Garrison
- Succeeded by: John W. Weeks

37th Mayor of Cleveland
- In office January 1, 1912 – December 31, 1915
- Preceded by: Herman C. Baehr
- Succeeded by: Harry L. Davis

Personal details
- Born: Newton Diehl Baker Jr. December 3, 1871 Martinsburg, West Virginia, U.S.
- Died: December 25, 1937 (aged 66) Shaker Heights, Ohio, U.S.
- Resting place: Lake View Cemetery (Cleveland, Ohio)
- Party: Democratic
- Spouse: Elizabeth Wells Leopold (m. 1902)
- Children: 3
- Education: Johns Hopkins University (BA); Washington and Lee University (LLB)
- Newton D. Baker's voice Newton D. Baker speaks about Americans choice and opportunities after the Great war (recorded 1918)

Newton Diehl Baker Jr. (December 3, 1871 – December 25, 1937) was an American lawyer, Georgist, politician, and government official. He served as the 37th mayor of Cleveland, Ohio from 1912 to 1915. As U.S. Secretary of War from 1916 to 1921, Baker presided over the United States Army during World War I.

Born in Martinsburg, West Virginia, Baker established a legal practice in Cleveland after graduating from Washington and Lee University School of Law. He became a progressive Democratic ally of Mayor Tom L. Johnson. Baker served as city solicitor of Cleveland from 1901 to 1909 before taking office as mayor in 1912. As mayor, he sought public transit reform, hospital improvement, and city beautification. Baker supported Woodrow Wilson at the 1912 Democratic National Convention, helping Wilson win the votes of the Ohio delegation. After leaving office, Baker accepted appointment as Secretary of War under President Wilson. He was one of several prominent Georgists appointed to positions in the Wilson Cabinet.

Baker presided over the U.S. military's participation in World War I. He selected General John J. Pershing to command the American Expeditionary Forces, which he insisted act as an independent unit. He left office in 1921 and returned to BakerHostetler, the legal practice he co-founded. He served as an attorney in Village of Euclid v. Ambler Realty Co., a landmark case that established the constitutionality of zoning laws. He was a strong supporter of the League of Nations and continued to advocate American participation in the League during the 1920s. Beginning in 1928, he served as a member of the Permanent Court of Arbitration. He was a candidate for the presidential nomination at the 1932 Democratic National Convention, but the convention chose Franklin D. Roosevelt.

== Early years ==
Newton Diehl Baker was born on December 3, 1871, in Martinsburg, West Virginia, the son of Newton Diehl Baker Sr. and Mary Ann (Dukehart) Baker. Baker's grandfather, Elias Baker, was a staunch unionist; his father, on the contrary, joined the Confederate Army, served as a cavalryman, was wounded, and became a northern prisoner of war. After returning home in 1865, he obtained a medical degree from the University of Maryland Medical School and worked as a physician in Martinsburg until his death in 1906.

Baker attended the village schools in Martinsburg through his second year in high school and finished his preparatory training at Episcopal High School in Alexandria, Virginia.

In 1892, Baker graduated with bachelor's degree from Johns Hopkins University, where he was a member of Phi Gamma Delta fraternity. He attended lectures of Woodrow Wilson, who was a visiting professor at the time. After receiving his law degree from Washington and Lee University School of Law in 1894, he tried for a year to establish law practice in Martinsburg, and then became private secretary to Postmaster General William L. Wilson, who served in the Confederate cavalry with Baker's father. He stayed in Washington, D.C. until June 1897, then took a vacation in Europe, and returned to Martinsburg. In January 1899, he became a junior partner at Foran, McTigne and Baker in Cleveland.

Baker was small and thin. He was rejected for military service in the Spanish–American War because of poor eyesight.

== Cleveland politics ==
When Baker moved to Cleveland, his political sympathies belonged to the Democratic Party; he supported the so-called Gold Democrats and their platform of gold standard, free trade, and civil service reform. He built a successful legal career and became involved in local politics. He helped the Democratic candidate Tom L. Johnson to become the mayor of Cleveland, and under his mentorship started his own public career. Johnson was a passionate advocate of Georgist political progressivism. Baker became exposed to Johnson's politics and also became a Georgist. He assisted Johnson in his fights against city's utility monopolies, e.g., Cleveland Electric Railway Company owned by Mark Hanna, which made Baker popular among Clevelanders.

After serving as city solicitor from 1901 to 1909, he became mayor of the city in 1911. As a city official, Baker's main interests were providing Cleveland with electricity (he built a municipal light plant), public transit reform, hospital improvement, and city beautification. He was a strong backer of Cleveland College, now a part of Case Western Reserve University. He and Augustus Raymond Hatton helped draft Ohio's home rule amendment. Its approval by voters in 1912 was Baker's crowning achievement as a mayor. It granted Cleveland a right to draw its own charter and conduct the city business without state interference.

When Baker worked on Wilson's behalf at the Democratic National Convention in Baltimore in 1912, he was considered as a possible vice-presidential contender. He and Wilson had been acquaintances since they were both at Johns Hopkins in the 1890s, and Baker played a vital role during Wilson's Democratic nomination for president at the convention by securing votes from Ohio delegates. Wilson wanted to bring him to Washington D.C. Though offered the post twice, Baker declined to serve as United States Secretary of the Interior during President Wilson's first term.

A 1993 survey of historians, political scientists and urban experts conducted by Melvin G. Holli of the University of Illinois at Chicago ranked Baker as the eighteenth-best American big-city mayor to have served between the years 1820 and 1993.

In 1916, following his tenure as mayor of Cleveland, Baker and two other partners founded the law firm of BakerHostetler.

== Secretary of War ==
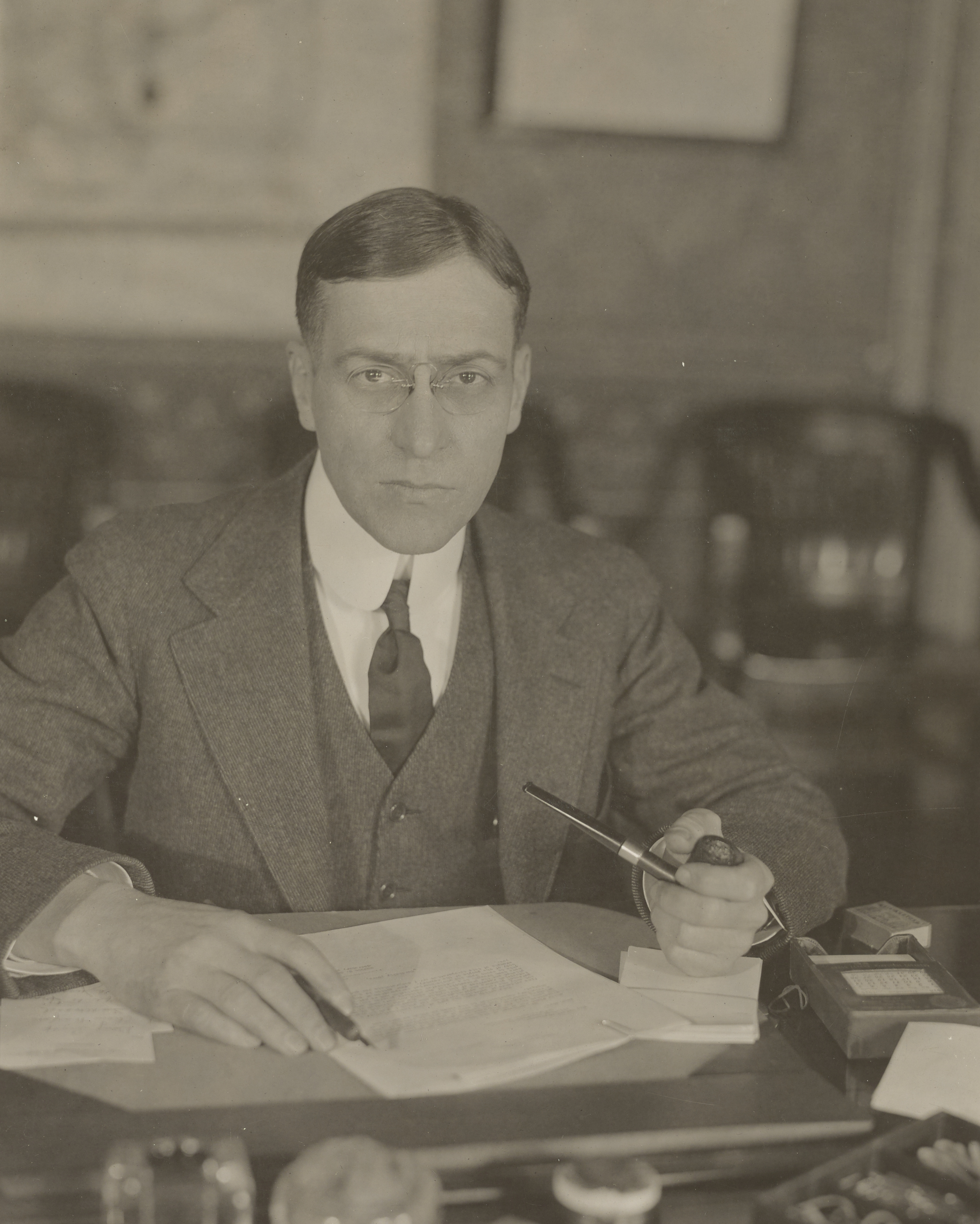
Baker in 1918 as Secretary of War

As the United States considered whether to enter World War I, President Woodrow Wilson had named Baker Secretary of War on 9 March 1916, because Baker was acceptable to advocates and opponents of American participation in the conflict. The post also required legal expertise because of the War Department's role in administering the Philippines, the Panama Canal, and Puerto Rico. The New York Times called him a "warm supporter" of the President. At 44, he was the youngest member of the Cabinet. The American entry into World War I occurred in April 1917.

One historian described his relationship to the military:

A civilian's civilian, Baker saw the military as a necessity, but he had no awe of people in uniform, no romantic feelings toward them, and no dreams of glory. ... On the day President Woodrow Wilson announced Baker's appointment as secretary of war, he admitted his ignorance of military matters. "I am an innocent," he told reporters, "I do not know anything about this job." But he had a sharp, analytical mind and considerable skill at administration.

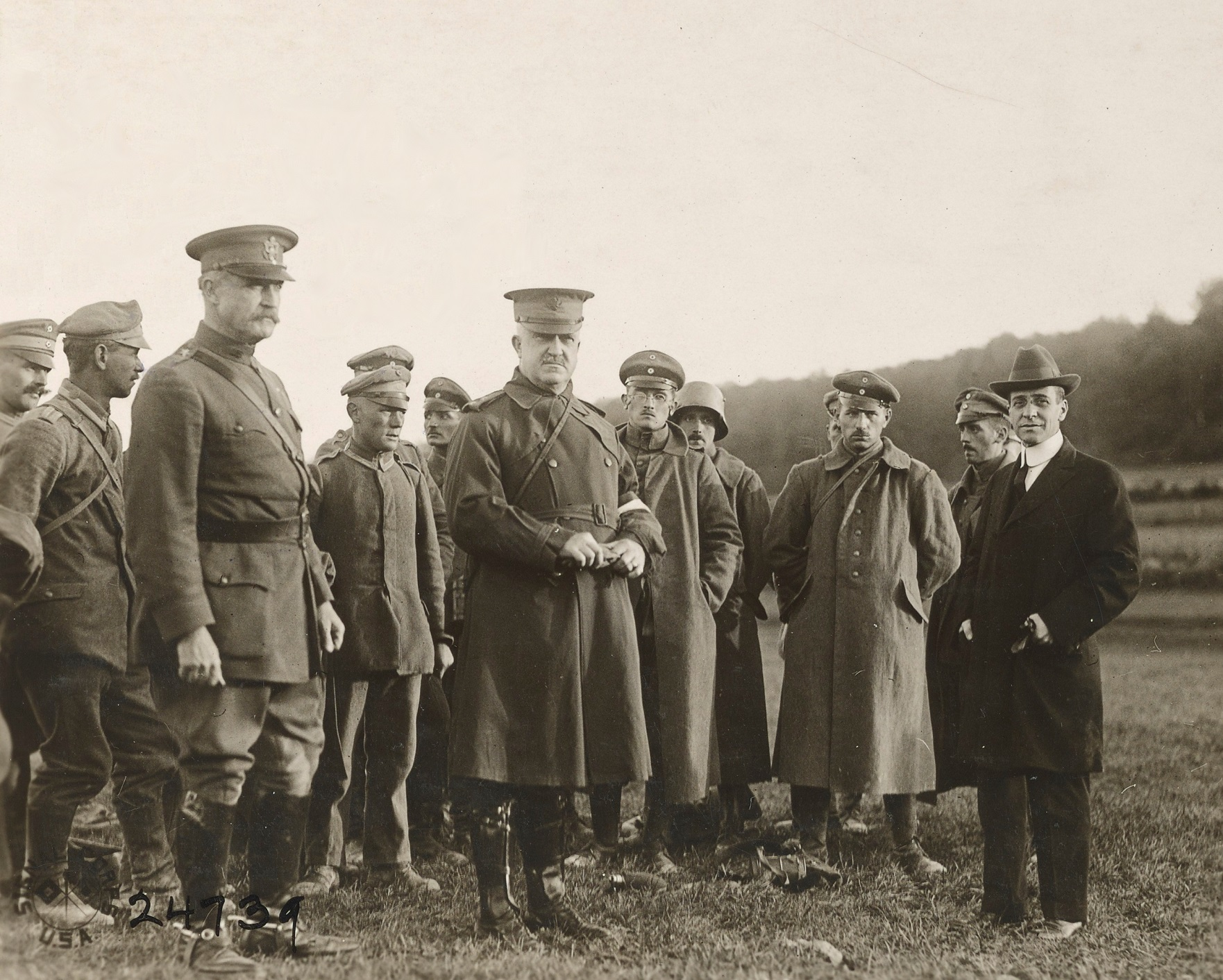
Secretary of War Newton D. Baker (right), Major General Andre Brewster (left) and Major General James W. McAndrew (center) with a group of German prisoners who have just arrived from the front, September 26, 1918.

As Secretary of War, Baker presided over the American military participation in the First World War in 1917 and 1918, including the creation of a nationwide military draft. Baker selected Gen. John J. Pershing to head the American Expeditionary Forces. At Baker's insistence, Wilson made the American forces an independent fighting partner of the Allies against the Central Powers, rather than letting American troops be used to replenish British and French forces as those nations advised.

On December 15, 1917, a War Council was formed (as distinct from the Council of National Defense) consisting of the Secretary of War, his Assistant, the Chief of Staff of the United States Army, the Quartermaster General of the United States Army, the Chief of Ordnance and possibly others. The War Council was to oversee and coordinate all matters of supply and to plan for the effective use of the military power of the nation. Baker had inherited a supply chain problem of gargantuan proportions although at first in April the administration knew nothing of its scale. Problems began quickly to crop up and on 18 December, three days after its formation, Baker fired three of the five officers appointed to the War Council. He appointed George Washington Goethals as Quartermaster General on that day.

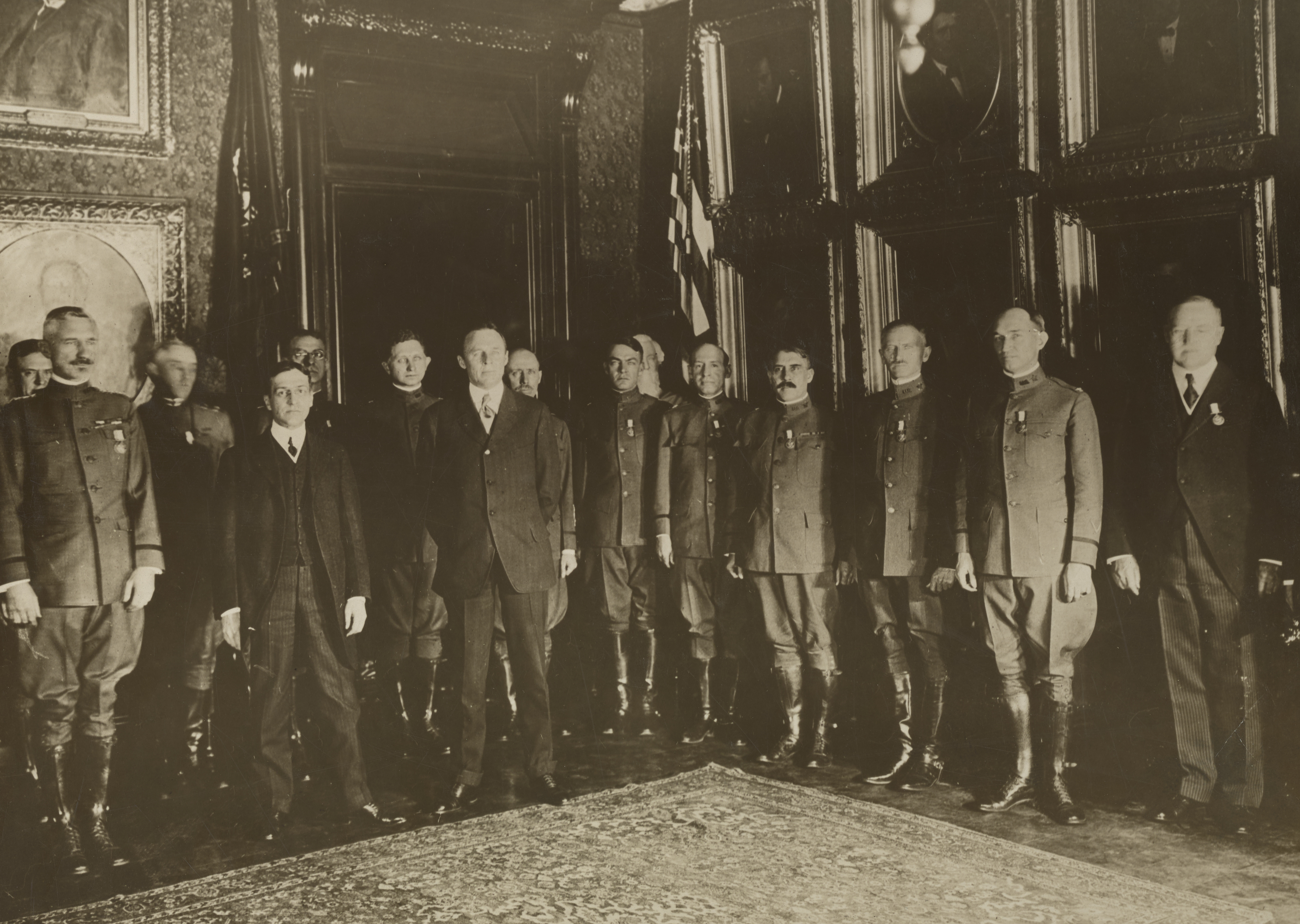
The Army Distinguished Service Medal presented by Secretary of War Newton D. Baker to several American generals for service in the world war, January 22, 1919. General Peyton C. March, the Army Chief of Staff (far left), is wearing his Army DSM, with Secretary Baker and Assistant Secretary Benedict Crowell to his left.

He was occasionally attacked by military professionals who thought him incompetent or a pacifist at heart. He said, "I'm so much of a pacifist, I'm willing to fight for it."

In 1917, Baker was elected an honorary member of the Virginia Society of the Cincinnati..

In 1918, Wilson told Baker that he hoped he would follow him into the White House in 1920..

Emmett Jay Scott served as Baker's Special Advisor of Black Affairs.

== Later years ==
After stepping down as Secretary of War in 1921, Baker returned to practicing law at Baker & Hostetler.

For several years he was the leading proponent of American participation in the League of Nations.

In 1922, the Encyclopædia Britannica published a brief account of Baker's life that drew sharp criticism. It said, in part, "The charge of pacifism was often brought against him and his career generally as Secretary was widely condemned throughout the United States." Among the prominent names who called the Encyclopedia to account were Livingston Farrand of Cornell and Ernest M. Hopkins of Dartmouth.

At the 1924 Democratic National Convention, during discussion of the party platform, Baker was the principal advocate of language committing the party to American membership in the League of Nations. After losing in the platform committee, which advocated a national referendum on the question, he raised the issue on the floor of the convention.

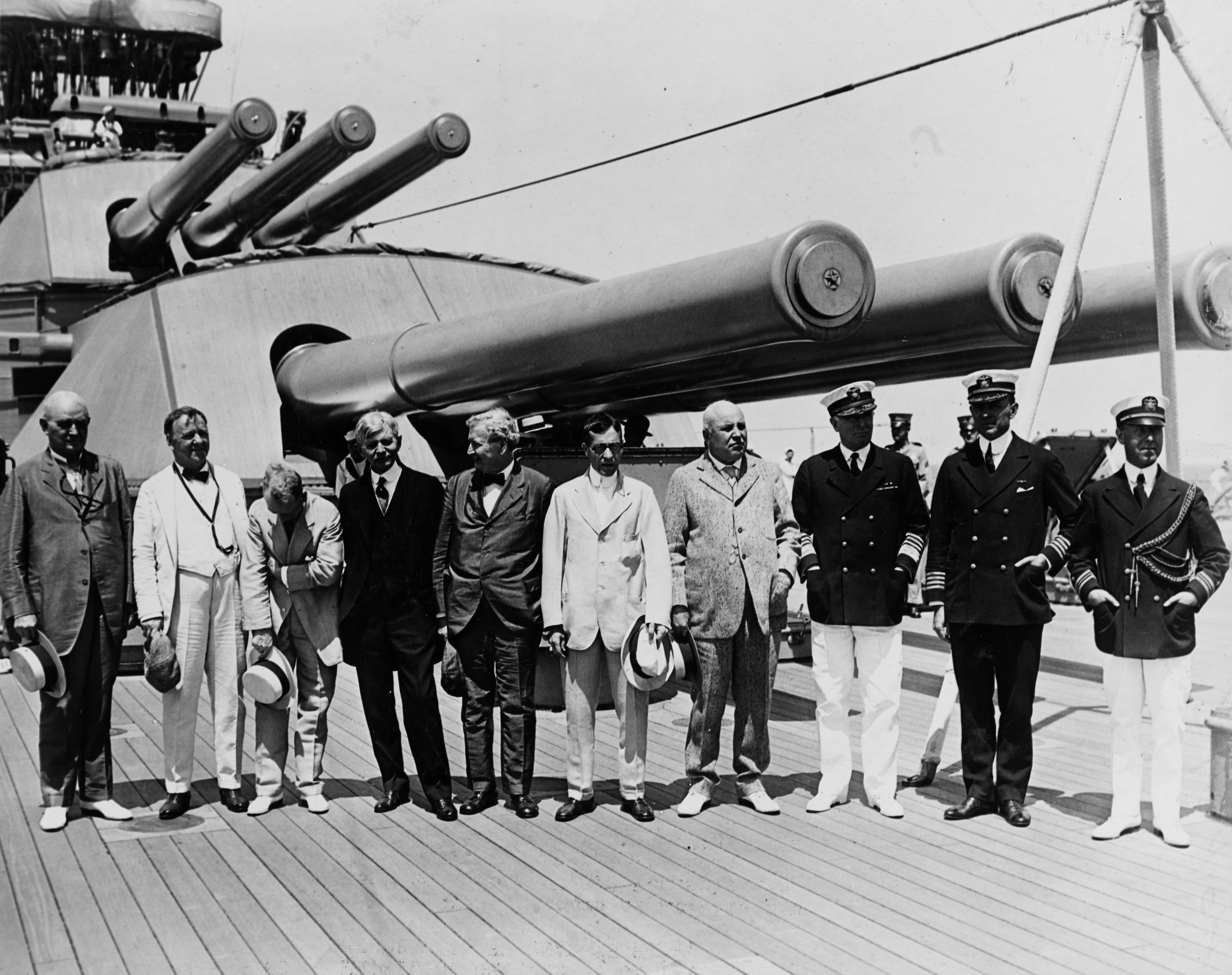
Members of Wilson's cabinet who went out on the USS Pennsylvania to receive him on 9 July 1919

Though he had no chance of winning over the delegates to support his position, he delivered a speech that was the highlight of the convention, "political oratory at its peak" according to an exhaustive account of the convention: "According to reporters, men and women everywhere burst into tears. It was a tour de force, emotional and bordering on hysteria." He drew upon memories of Wilson, who had died just five months earlier and pleaded for a return to Wilsonian idealism:

On fields of Europe I closed the eyes of soldiers in American uniforms who were dying ... and oh, they were so superb and splendid: never a complaint; never a regret; willing to go if only two things might be: One, that mother might know that they died bravely, and the other, that somebody would pick up their sacrifice and build on earth a permanent temple of peace. ...

And I swore an obligation to the dead that in season and out, by day and by night, in church, in political meeting, in the market-place, I intended to lift up my voice always and ever until their sacrifice were really perfected. ...

I served Woodrow Wilson for five years. He is standing at the throne of God whose approval he won and has received. As he looks down from there I say to him: "I did my best. I am doing it now. You are still the captain of my soul. I feel your spirit here palpably about me." He is standing here, through my weak voice, his presence not that crippled, shrunken, broken figure that I last saw, but the great majestic leader is standing here, using me to say to you, "Save mankind, do America's duty".

When his allotted 20 minutes expired, the crowd roared for him to continue. After an hour he left the lectern to a tremendous ovation. Speakers who tried to argue against him were booed. Yet the final vote went against him by a margin of more than 2 to 1. According to a New York Times editorial,

For a moment that vast audience was lifted from partisan thoughts to heights from which it could have a glimpse of the promised land of peace. ... Not only did Mr. Baker do his best, but he made one of the best and most moving speeches heard of late in any political meeting. He showed himself a disciple worthy to wear his master's mantle. He too has the spirit of prophecy upon him.

Later at the convention, he nominated former Governor James M. Cox of Ohio as his state's "favorite son."

In 1928, President Coolidge appointed Baker a member of the Permanent Court of Arbitration of The Hague, and he was reappointed to another six-year term by Roosevelt in 1935. In 1929, President Herbert Hoover appointed Baker to the Wickersham Commission on issues relating to law enforcement, criminal activity, police brutality, and Prohibition.

He remained active in Democratic Party affairs and was considered as a serious prospect for the Democratic nomination for President in 1932, when he declined to announce his candidacy but worked behind the scenes in the hope of being chosen if Franklin D. Roosevelt failed to win the nomination.

Yale University awarded him an honorary Doctor of Laws in 1932.

Baker argued before the U.S. Supreme Court as counsel for the property owner in Village of Euclid v. Ambler Realty Co., a landmark case that established the constitutionality of zoning laws.

Baker served on the Board of Trustees of Johns Hopkins University beginning in 1918 and was considered for appointment as president of the institution in 1928.

In 1936, he resigned as a member of the Cuyahoga County Democratic Committee after serving for 26 years. He was elected to the American Philosophical Society that same year.

He published a lecture in pamphlet form as War in the Modern World in 1935.

== Personal life ==
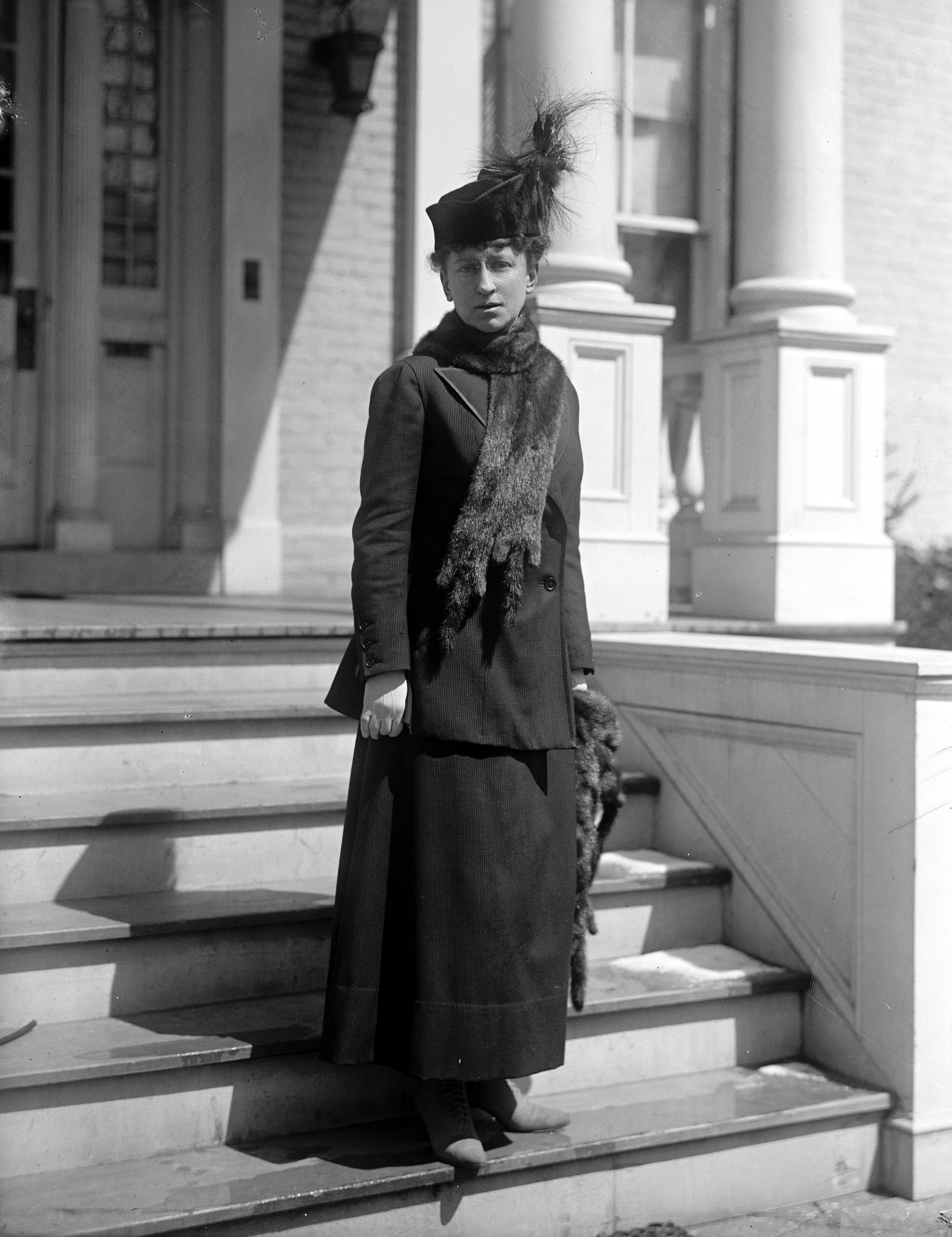
Elizabeth Leopold Baker

Baker married Elizabeth Wells Leopold, a faculty member at Wilson College, on July 5, 1902. They had two daughters (Margaret and Elizabeth) and a son, Newton D. Baker III, all of whom survived him, as did five grandchildren.

Confined to his bed after December 3, 1937, because of a longstanding heart condition, Baker died of a cerebral hemorrhage in Shaker Heights, Ohio, on Christmas Day, December 25, 1937. After lying in state with full military honors at Trinity Cathedral and a simple funeral at the family's request, Baker was buried in Lake View Cemetery. His wife died on August 24, 1951.

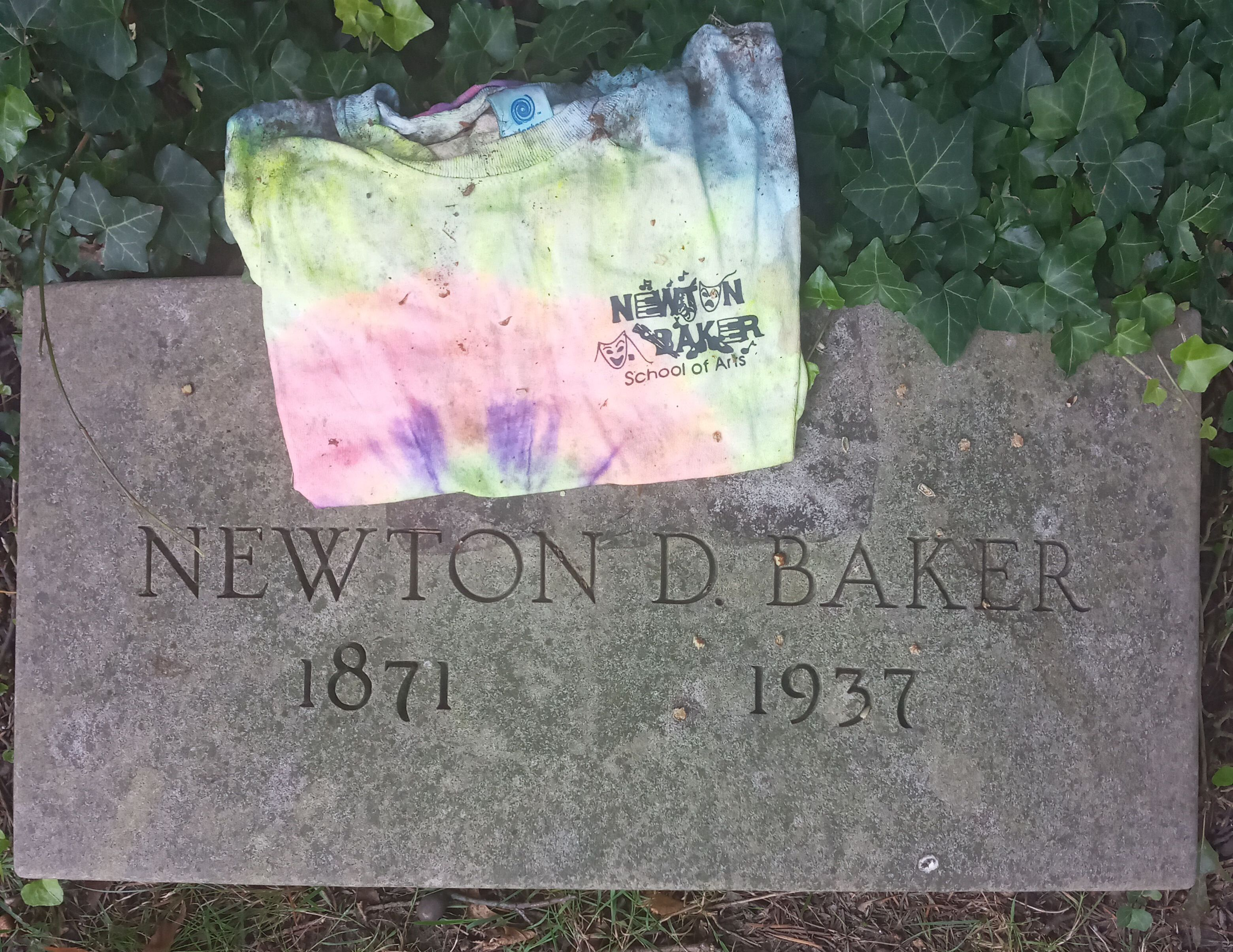
The gravesite of Secretary Newton D. Baker

== Legacy ==
During World War II the Liberty ship SS Newton D. Baker was built in Panama City, Florida, and named in his honor.

In 1957 Western Reserve University, now Case Western Reserve, erected the Newton D. Baker Building in his honor. Located on the corner of Adelbert and Euclid, across from Severance Hall, it served as a large unit of general purpose classrooms and administrative offices. The building was torn down in November 2004.

The Georgetown mansion Baker occupied while Secretary of War, now known as Newton D. Baker House, is on the National Register of Historic Places.

The law firm he founded, Baker Hostetler, is one of the nation's 100 largest firms.

Baker High School and Newton D. Baker School of Arts located on W. 159th Street in West Park, Cleveland are both named after Baker. A dormitory at Ohio State University, dedicated in 1940, is named Baker Hall (see information about the building) in his honor. The Newton D. Baker dormitory at Washington and Lee University is also named for him. The Veterans Administration Hospital in his hometown of Martinsburg WV was originally named the Newton D. Baker Hospital and is still referred to as such by local residents.

Political offices
Preceded by Herman C. Baehr	Mayor of Cleveland; 1912–1915	Succeeded by Harry L. Davis
Preceded by Lindley M. Garrison	U.S. Secretary of War; Served under: Woodrow Wilson; March 9, 1916 – March 4, 1921	Succeeded by John W. Weeks
