= Phenix City Public Schools =

School district in Alabama, United States

Phenix City Public Schools is a school district located in Phenix City, Russell County, Alabama.

== Schools ==
- Central High School/Central Freshman Academy
- South Girard Jr. High School
- Phenix City Intermediate School
- Lakewood Primary School
- Lakewood Elementary School
- Meadowlane Elementary School
- Phenix City Elementary School
- Ridgecrest Elementary School
- Sherwood Elementary School
- Westview Elementary School
