= Transportation in Cleveland =

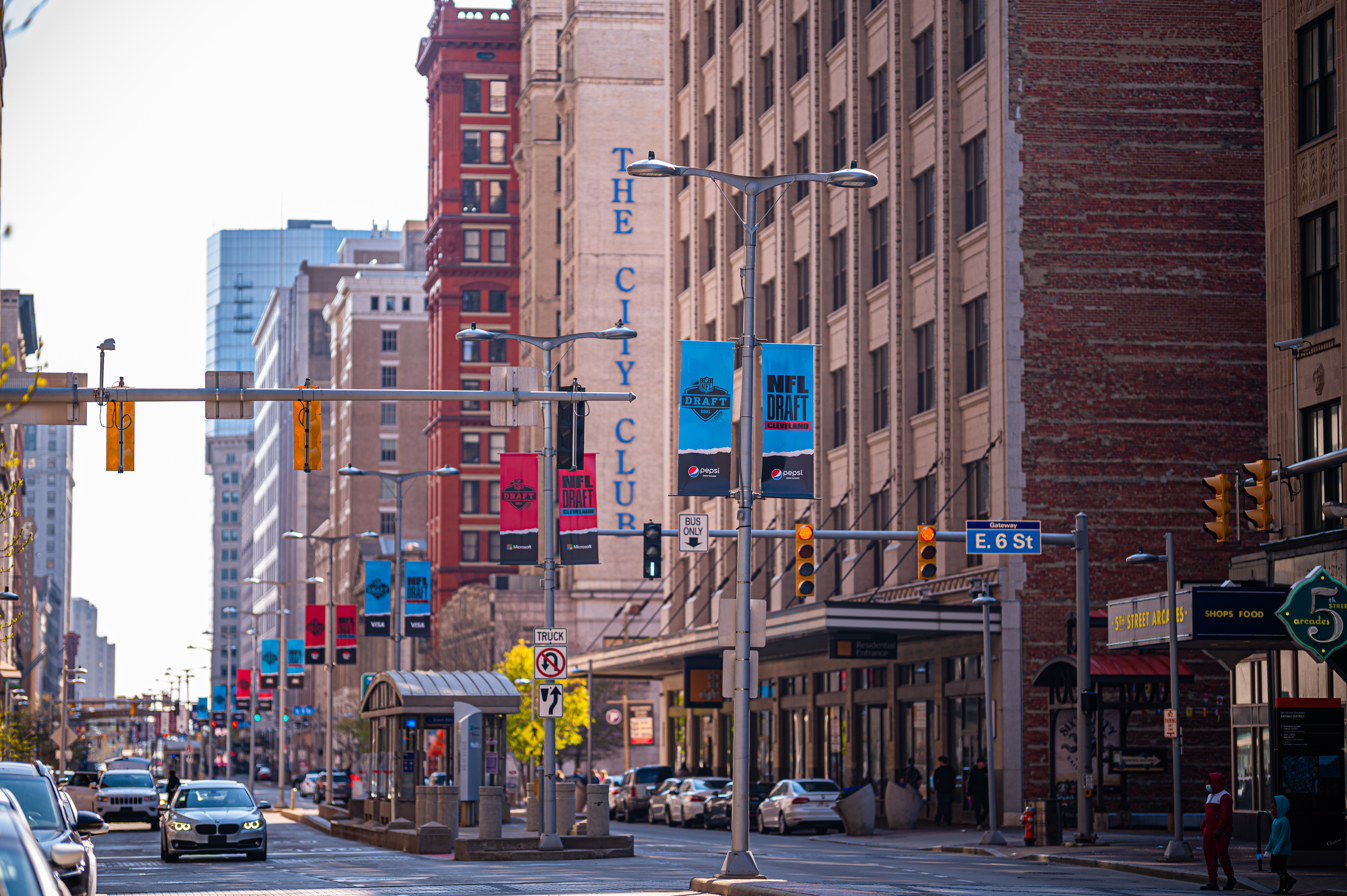
Euclid Avenue in Cleveland

The transportation system of Cleveland is a network that includes several modes of transportation including sidewalks, roads, public transit, bicycle paths and regional and international airports.

== Walkability ==
In 2011, Walk Score ranked Cleveland the seventeenth most walkable of the fifty largest cities in the United States. As of 2014, Walk Score increased Cleveland's rank to being the sixteenth most walkable US city, with a Walk Score of 57, a Transit Score of 47, and a Bike Score of 51. Cleveland's most walkable and transient areas can be found in the Downtown, Ohio City, Detroit-Shoreway, University Circle, and Buckeye-Shaker Square neighborhoods.

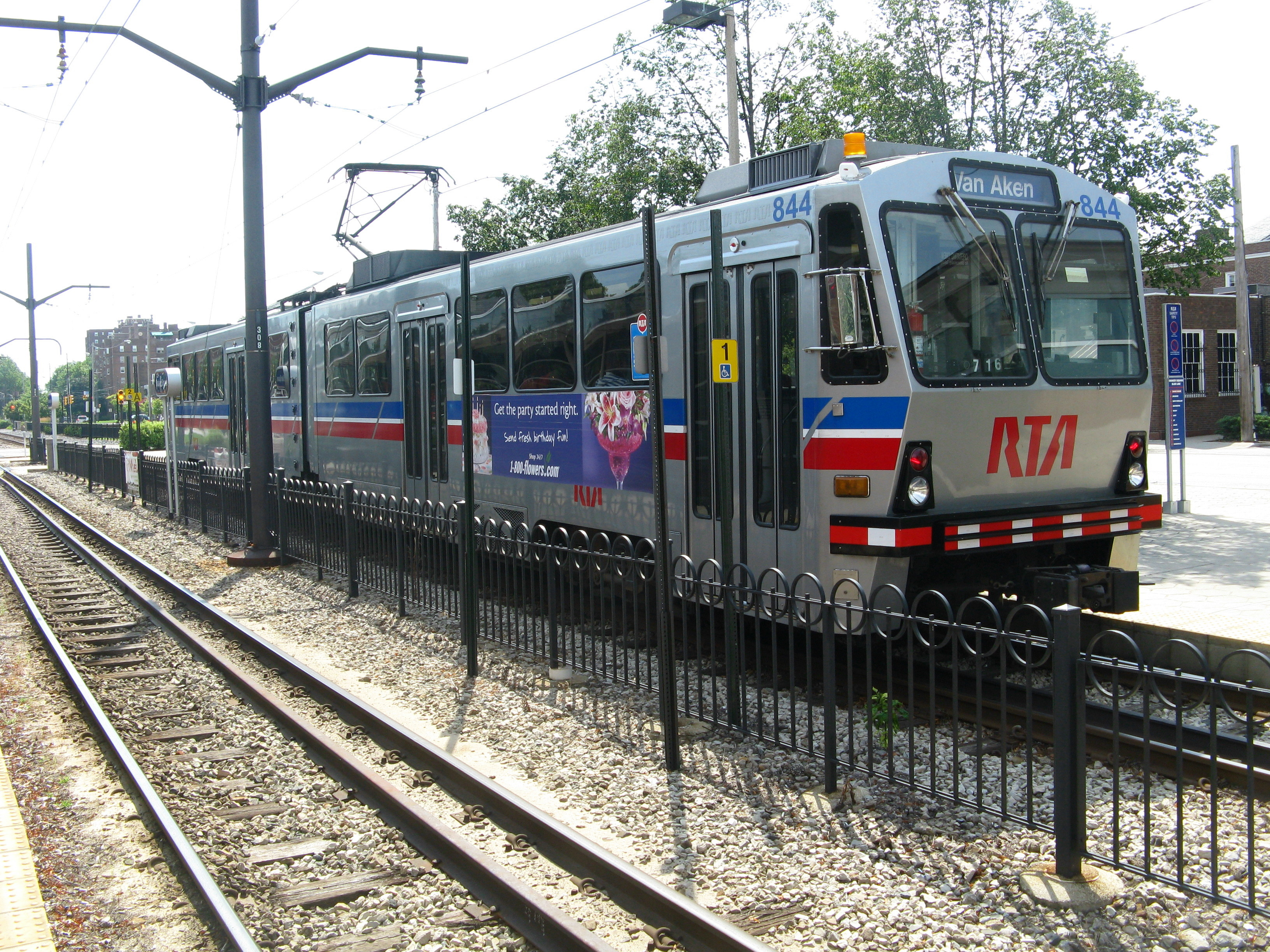
An RTA train arrives at the Shaker Square station

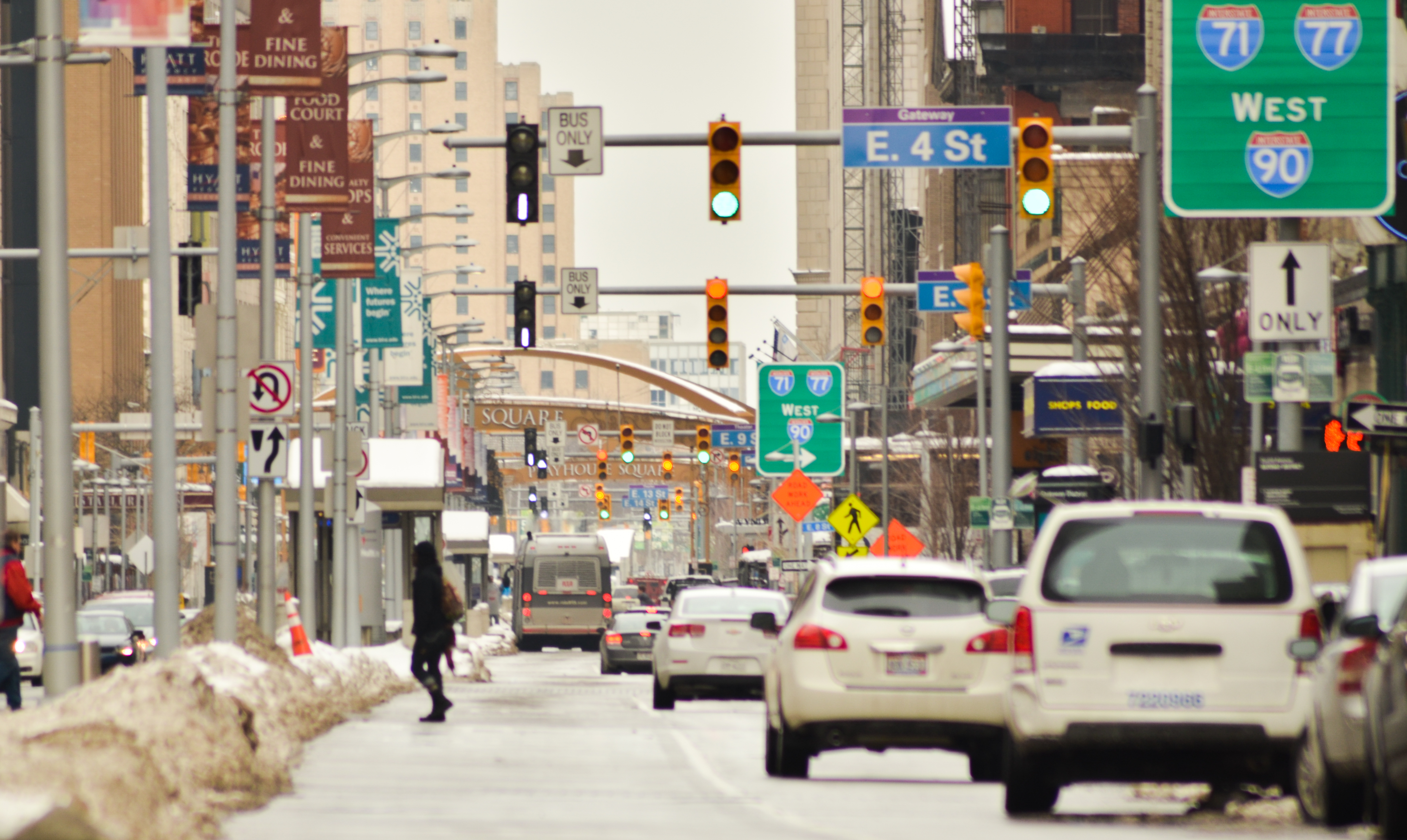
Streets of Cleveland

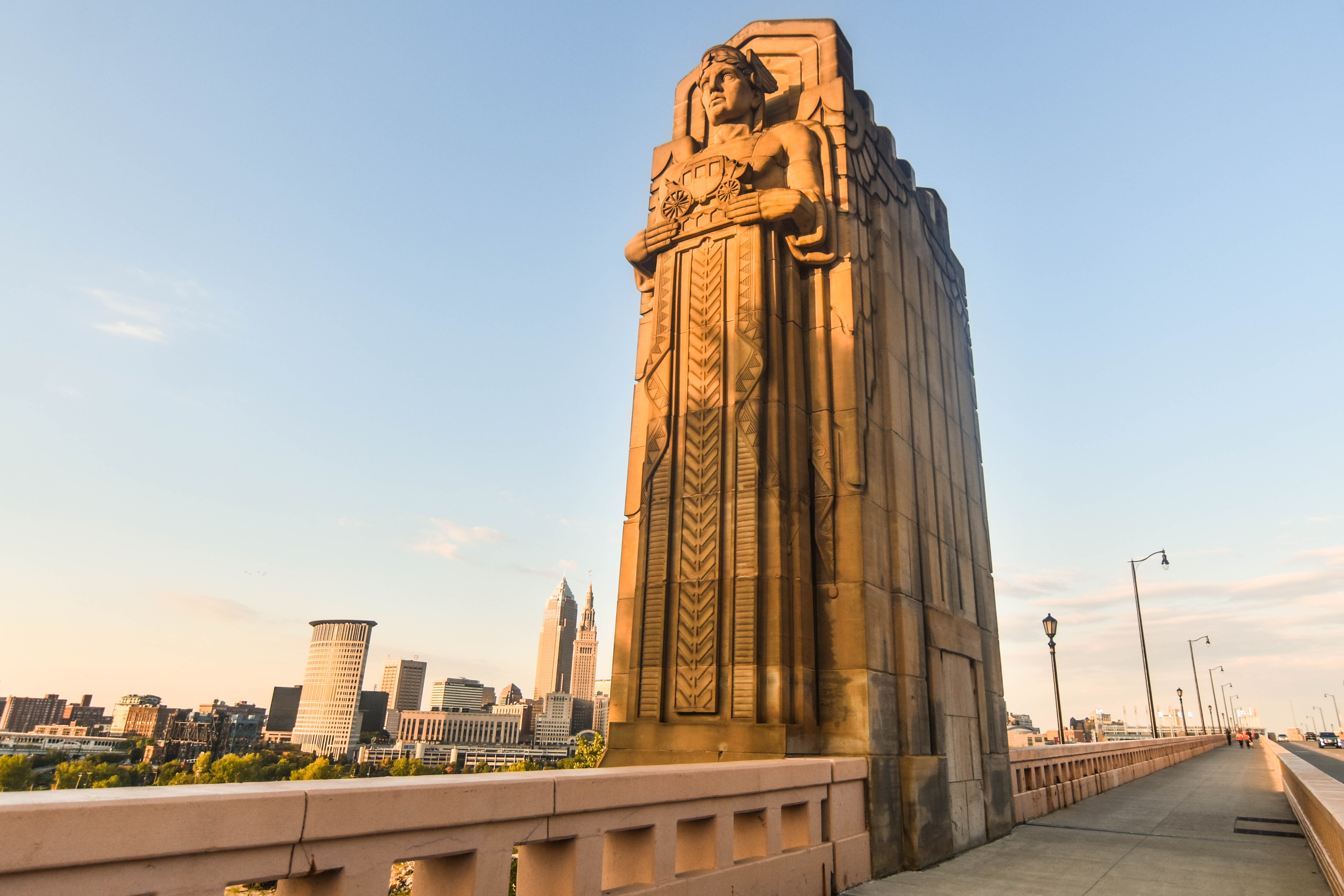
One of the "Guardians of Traffic" at the Hope Memorial Bridge

== Urban transit systems ==
Cleveland has a bus and rail mass transit system operated by the Greater Cleveland Regional Transit Authority (RTA). The rail portion is officially called the RTA Rapid Transit, but local residents refer to it as The Rapid. It consists of three light rail lines, known as the Blue, Green, and Waterfront Lines, and a heavy rail line, the Red Line. In 2008, RTA completed the HealthLine, a bus rapid transit line, for which naming rights were purchased by the Cleveland Clinic and University Hospitals. It runs along Euclid Avenue from downtown through University Circle, ending at the Louis Stokes Station at Windermere in East Cleveland. In 1968, Cleveland became the first city in the nation to have a direct rail transit connection linking the city's downtown to its major airport. In 2007, the American Public Transportation Association named Cleveland's mass transit system the best in North America. Cleveland is the only metropolitan area in the Western Hemisphere with its rail rapid transit system having only one center-city area rapid transit station (Tower City-Public Square).

== Private automobiles ==
The city of Cleveland has a higher than average percentage of households without a car. In 2016, 23.7 percent of Cleveland households lacked a car, while the national average was 8.7 percent. Cleveland averaged 1.19 cars per household in 2016, compared to a national average of 1.8.

== Roads ==
Cleveland's road system consists of numbered streets running roughly north–south, and named avenues, which run roughly east–west. The numbered streets are designated "east" or "west", depending where they lie in relation to Ontario Street, which bisects Public Square. The numbered street system extends beyond the city limits into some suburbs on both the West and East Sides. The named avenues that lie both on the east side of the Cuyahoga River and west of Ontario Street receive a "west" designation on street signage. The two downtown avenues which span the Cuyahoga change names on the west side of the river. Superior Avenue becomes Detroit Avenue on the West Side, and Carnegie Avenue becomes Lorain Avenue. The bridges that make these connections are often called the Detroit–Superior Bridge and the Lorain–Carnegie Bridge.

=== Freeways ===
Three two-digit Interstate Highways serve Cleveland directly. Interstate 71 (I-71) begins just southwest of downtown and is the major route from downtown Cleveland to the airport. I-71 runs through the southwestern suburbs and eventually connects Cleveland with Columbus and Cincinnati. I-77 begins in downtown Cleveland and runs almost due south through the southern suburbs. I-77 sees the least traffic of the three interstates, although it does connect Cleveland to Akron. I-90 connects the two sides of Cleveland and is the northern terminus for both I-71 and I-77. Running due east–west through the West Side suburbs, I-90 turns northeast at the junction with I-490 and is known as the Innerbelt through downtown. At the junction with the Shoreway, I-90 makes a 90-degree turn known in the area as Dead Man's Curve, then continues northeast, entering Lake County near the eastern split with State Route 2 (SR 2). Cleveland is also served by two three-digit Interstates, I-480, which enters Cleveland briefly at a few points and I-490, which connects I-77 with the junction of I-90 and I-71 just south of downtown.

Two other limited-access highways serve Cleveland. The Cleveland Memorial Shoreway carries SR 2 along its length, and at varying points also carries U.S. Route 6 (US 6), US 20 and I-90. The Jennings Freeway (SR 176) connects I-71 just south of I-90 to I-480 near the suburbs of Parma and Brooklyn Heights. A third highway, the Berea Freeway (SR 237 in part), connects I-71 to the airport, and forms part of the boundary between Cleveland and Brook Park.

== Airports ==
Cleveland Hopkins International Airport is the city's major airport and an international airport that once served as a main hub for United Airlines and Continental Airlines. It holds the distinction of having the first airport-to-downtown rapid transit connection in North America, established in 1968. In 1930, the airport was the site of the first airfield lighting system and the first air traffic control tower. Originally known as Cleveland Municipal Airport, it was the first municipally owned airport in the country. Cleveland Hopkins is a significant regional air freight hub hosting FedEx Express, UPS Airlines, United States Postal Service, and major commercial freight carriers. In addition to Hopkins, Cleveland is served by Burke Lakefront Airport, on the north shore of downtown between Lake Erie and the Shoreway. Burke is primarily a commuter and business airport.

== Seaport ==
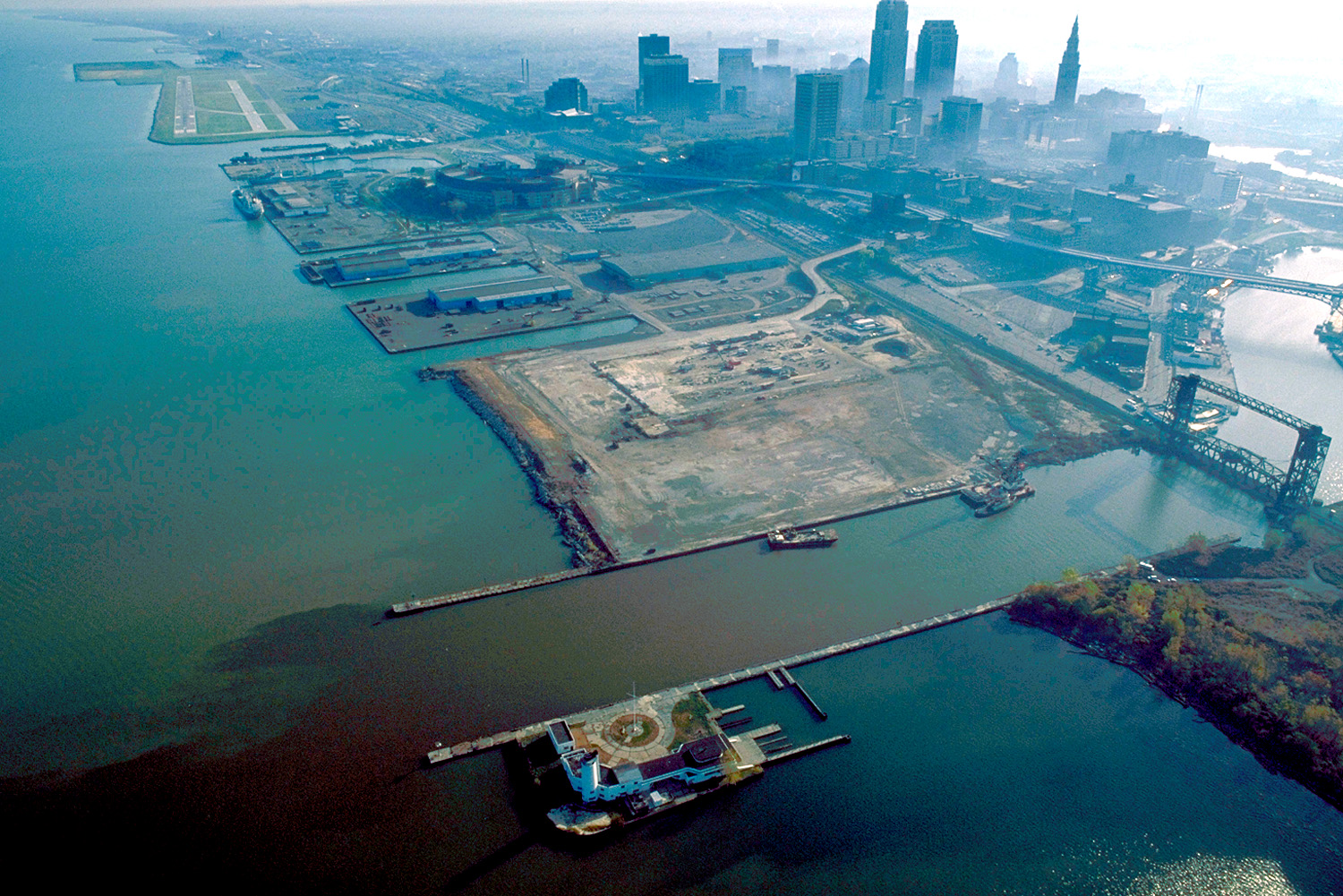
1992 aerial view of the Cleveland harbor, with the mouth of the Cuyahoga River in the foreground (view towards the east)

The Port of Cleveland, at the Cuyahoga River's mouth, is a major bulk freight terminal on Lake Erie, receiving much of the raw materials used by the region's manufacturing industries. In addition to freight, the Port of Cleveland also welcomes regional and international tourists who pass through the city on Great Lakes cruises. Currently docking at Dock 28, just west of First Energy Stadium. The cruises currently run from mid-May through mid-October.

== Railroads ==
Cleveland has a long rich history as a major railroad hub in the United States. Today, Amtrak, the national passenger rail system, provides service to Cleveland, via the Capitol Limited and Lake Shore Limited routes, which stop at Cleveland Lakefront Station. Additionally, Cleveland hosts several inter-modal freight railroad terminals, for Norfolk Southern, CSX and several smaller companies. There have been several proposals for commuter rail in Cleveland, including a study into a Sandusky–Cleveland line. Cleveland was also identified as a hub for the now-suspended Ohio Hub project, which would bring high-speed rail to Ohio.

== Inter-city bus lines ==
National intercity bus service is provided at a Greyhound station, just behind the Playhouse Square theater district. Megabus provides service to Cleveland and has a stop at the Stephanie Tubbs Jones Transit Center on the east side of downtown. Akron Metro, Brunswick Transit Alternative, Laketran, Lorain County Transit, and Medina County Transit provide connecting bus service to the Greater Cleveland Regional Transit Authority. Geauga County Transit and Portage Area Regional Transportation Authority (PARTA) also offer connecting bus service in their neighboring areas.

== See also ==
- Plug-in electric vehicles in Ohio § Cleveland
