= Baker High School (Georgia) =

Coordinates: 32°25′26″N 84°56′44″W

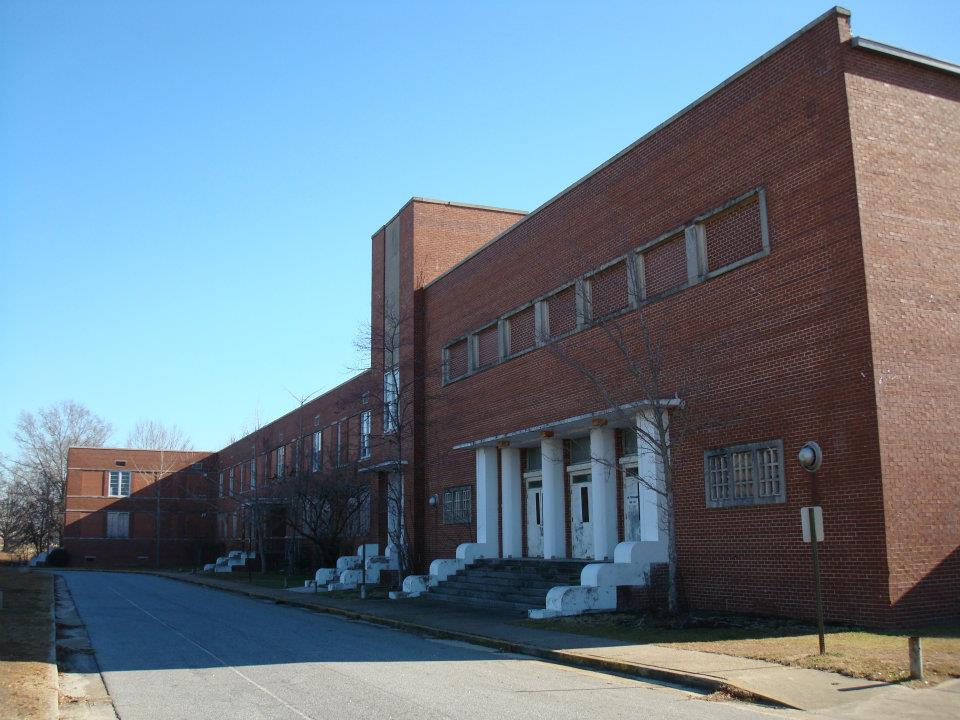
- Columbus, Georgia; United States

Information
- School type: Public
- Established: 1943
- Closed: 1991
- Colors: Blue and white
- Website: http://www.bakerlionspride.com/

Baker High School was located in Columbus, Georgia, United States. It was built in 1943 near Fort Benning and named for Newton Diehl Baker, Secretary of War during World War I. The first graduates received their diplomas in 1945. Baker High served Columbus and Fort Benning for nearly fifty years, producing graduates who excelled in scholarship, athletics, and the arts. The last class of seniors graduated on June 6, 1991. The Baker name lives on at Baker Middle School a few blocks east on Benning Drive. Baker High School was demolished in 2011. On May 18, 2013, a historical marker was placed at the site of the former school by the Historic Chattahoochee Commission and the Baker High School Alumni Association.

The 1963 Lion's Tale-student handbook

== History and facts ==
1941 - Muscogee County received a $500,000 appropriation from the Federal government to build a school in rural South Columbus, primarily to serve military families.

1943 - Construction was completed in August and Baker Village School opened on September 13 for grades 1-11. The school was named for Newton D. Baker, Secretary of War (1917–21) under President Woodrow Wilson. To support the war effort, a canning plant was built in the basement for the local victory gardens. Citizens were allowed to cook, prepare, and can their own vegetables so that regular crops could go to the troops. Louise Griner taught Home Economics during the day and ran the cannery at night.

1945 - The first edition of the Arrowhead, Baker's yearbook, was published. Its name reflected the heritage of the Muscogee Indians, a tribe of the Creeks, who once lived where Baker stood. Baker’s mascot was the “Indians”.

1948 - Baker changed their mascot to the "Lion".

1950 - Baker switched to a twelve-year format. Previously only eleven years were required to graduate.

1954 - Baker won its first state basketball championship. Other state titles were basketball in 1956 and track in 1964, 1965, 1966, 1968 and 1969. Baker athletes were nicknamed the "Blue Jackets."

1956 - The band and chorus rooms were constructed on the west side of the school.

1958 - The last kindergarten through sixth grade classes started at Baker in September. The first enriched or "accelerated" classes were added to the course schedule, along with remedial classes. This three-tier grouping of students at Baker was a first in Muscogee County.

1959 - The Alice Mae Dennis Chapter of National Honor Society was chartered.

1961 - Newt Gingrich graduated from Baker. Newt was elected to Congress serving as Representative of Georgia's 6th District and was elected Speaker of the House, serving from 1995 to 1999.

1963 - Baker was integrated by four young women from Carver High School. The event was captured by a television crew sent to record the event. They did not complete the school year due to the social isolation from the white students.

1964 - Baker was the largest school in Georgia with 2,800 students. The "platoon" system was used to accommodate the large numbers. The first classes started at 7:45 am and the second shift started at 8:45 am. Classes were held in the gym, library, and storage rooms. Freshmen were bused to the "freshman annex" for classes. Several girls who did not play instruments in the band were selected as majorettes, and the Dandylions, a dance team, were formed. We attended class in the janitorial closet on the second floor located above the Principals office with a windows that you could access the roof making a quick transition to the front portion of the school, there were 14 students plus the teacher.

1965 - The senior wing, new gym, and cafeteria were constructed, creating the courtyard. An official dedication ceremony was held for Baker High School. The first African-American students, Robert Leonard and Larry Smith, were admitted. Leonard was remembered for the "Cassius Clay" skit, and for getting one of the loudest rounds of applause at graduation. Smith was on the State Championship-winning track team.

1966 - Victoria Morales graduated from Baker and eventually went on to star as Leslie Brooks on the soap opera The Young and the Restless.

1969 - Donald Ray Johnston '66 was posthumously awarded the Congressional Medal of Honor "for conspicuous gallantry and intrepidity in action at the risk of his life above and beyond the call of duty."

1970 - The first edition of the Lion's Pride, the new title for Baker's yearbook, was published.

1971 - Muscogee County schools were integrated. A boiler fire on March 31 destroyed the auditorium.

1991 - The last Baker High class graduated on June 6. The school was then converted to a middle school.

1999 - Baker Middle School moved to its new campus just down the street. The original building was closed.

2010 - Fire destroyed much of the freshman wing of the abandoned Baker High School.

2011 - Baker High School was demolished.

2013 - A historic marker was dedicated on May 18.

== Notable alumni ==
- Newt Gingrich, (1961), Speaker of the United States House of Representatives from 1995 to 1999, and 2012 Republican 2012 presidential candidate.
