= Cleveland Clinic fire of 1929 =

1929 fire in Cleveland, Ohio

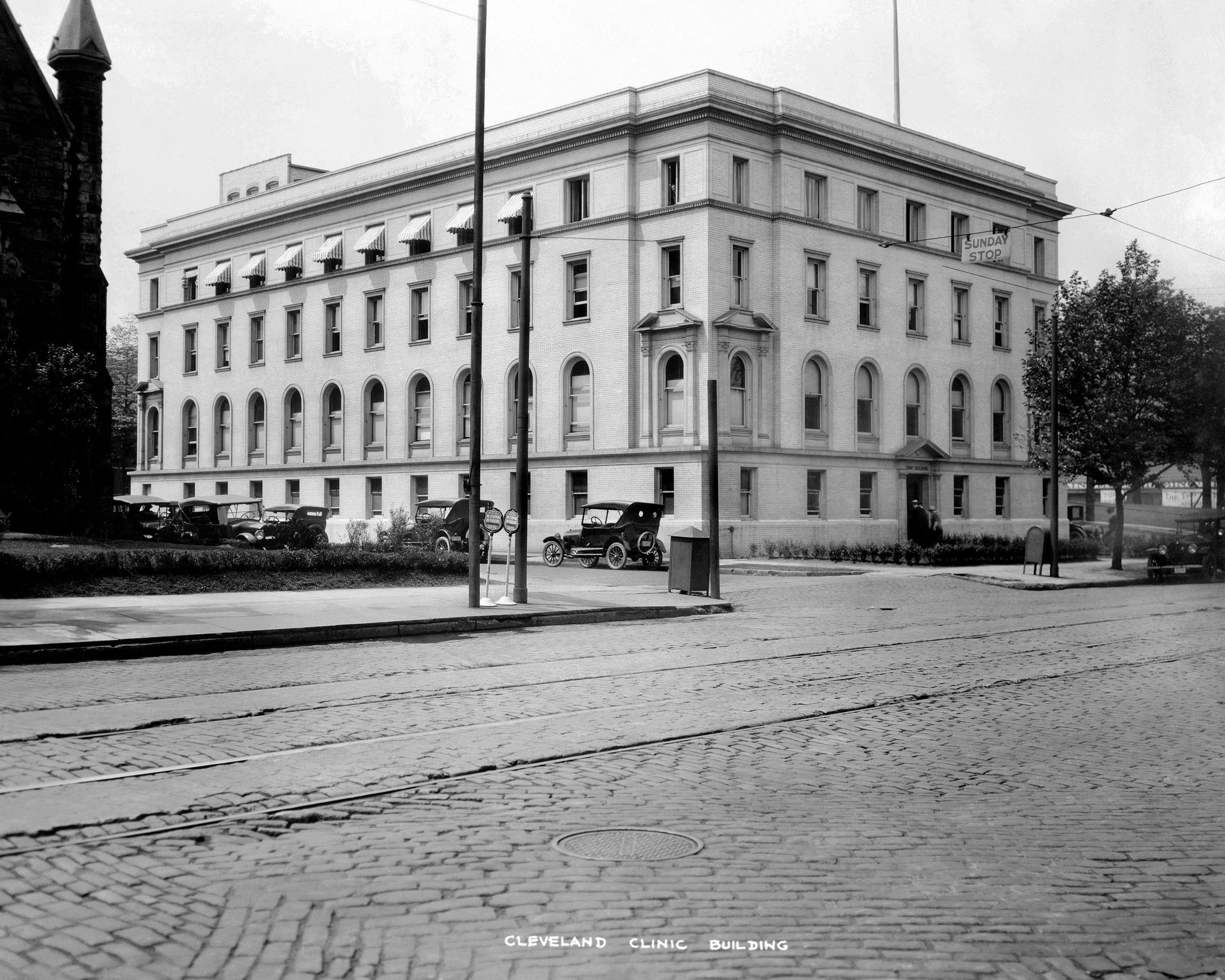
- Date: May 15, 1929
- Time: 11:30 AM
- Location: Cleveland Clinic, Cleveland, Ohio, U.S.; 41.503146°N 81.621946°W
- Deaths: 123
- Injuries: 92
- Property damage: US$50,000 (equivalent to $938,000 in 2025)
- Awards: US$45,000

A major structure fire occurred at the Cleveland Clinic in Cleveland, Ohio, United States, on May 15, 1929. Nitrocellulose X-ray film ignited in a basement storage room, emitting a poisonous yellowish-brown gas which spread throughout much of the Clinic and subsequently exploded several times. The fire claimed 123 lives including that of one of the Clinic's founders, Dr. John Phillips. Most of the deaths from the fire were due to toxic inhalation. Many were immediate; some were delayed by hours or even days. A policeman, Ernest Staab, rescued 21 victims from the fire, and left the scene, seemingly in good health. He later collapsed while working on his lawn, was hospitalized, but contrary to many contemporaneous newspaper articles (Note: Contemporaneous news articles, such as The New York Times and The Washington Post articles published immediately after the disaster, listed Staab as dead (as well as other reflective accounts). A 1931 article in the Grand Island Daily Independent indicates that Staab survived.) survived and worked for the police department for another 25 years.

== Disaster ==
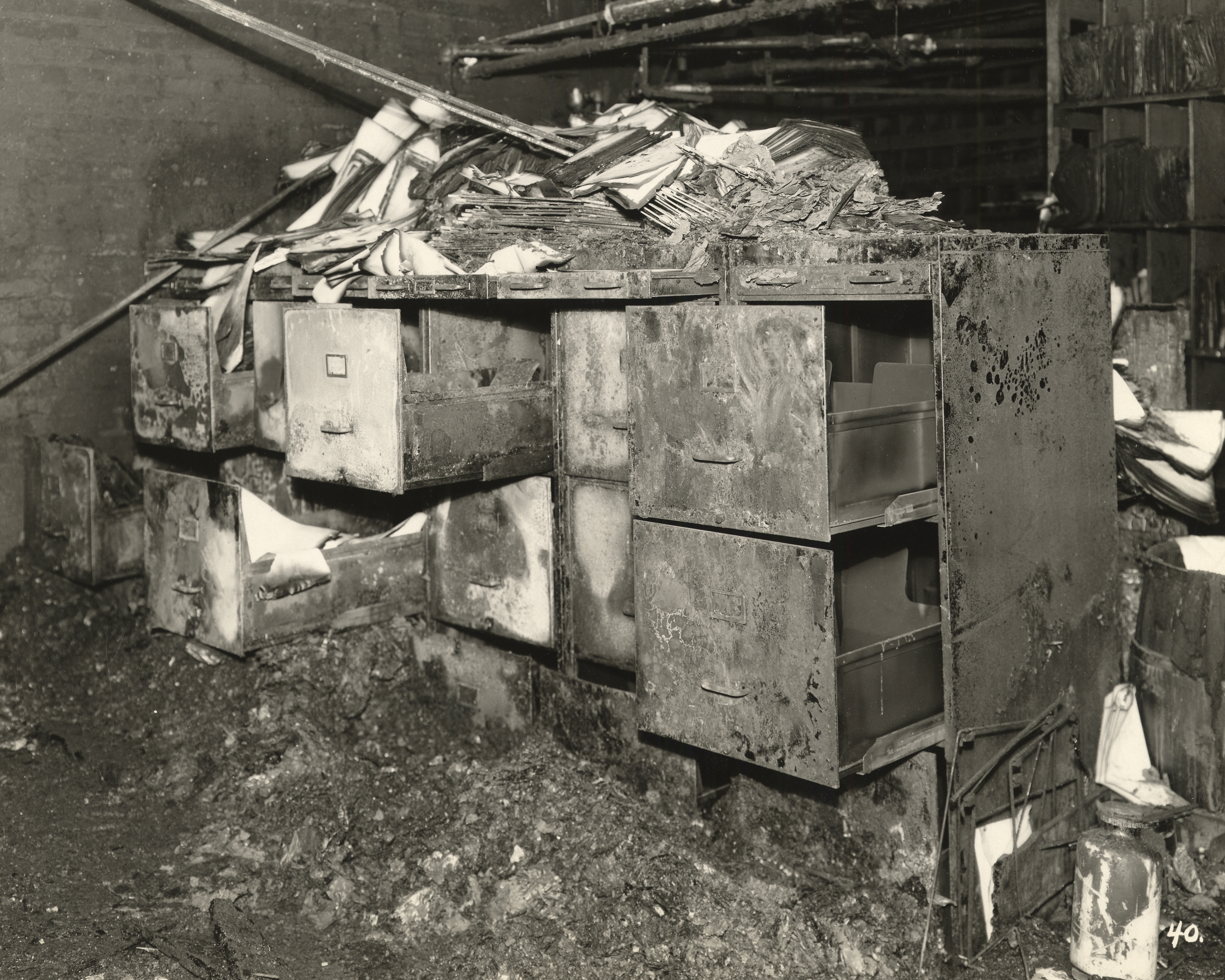
The X-ray file room after the fire

The Cleveland Clinic is a non-profit Ohio corporation, founded in 1921 by four physicians. On May 15, 1929, which was a Wednesday, the four-story Clinic building on Euclid Avenue was bustling with physicians, nurses, employees and patients, busy with the work of the Clinic's medical-surgical practice. Some 250 people were estimated to be in the building that day.

A steam leak had been discovered in the basement room where the Clinic's voluminous X-ray film records, estimated to be at least 4,200 pounds (1,900 kg) – possibly as much as 10,000 pounds (4,500 kg) – were stored. A steamfitter began repairs at 9 a.m., stripped some of the insulation from the steam pipes, then left the building to turn off the steam and allow the pipe to cool down sufficiently so that the repair could be completed safely. A few hours later, around 11 a.m., he returned to the X-ray storage room, and encountered a noxious cloud of yellowish-brown gas. After a futile attempt to control the fire with a fire extinguisher, a small explosion, the first of several, expelled him from the room. He and a maintenance man working in the basement's adjacent mechanical room raised the initial alarm.

The burning nitrocellulose X-ray films quickly produced a significant amount of poisonous gas which spread throughout much of the building via the pipe chases which connected to the neighboring mechanical room. A stair door on the third floor was held open by a foot latch, and the toxic gas was especially thick on that floor. Later chemical analysis suggested the victims inhaled phosgene, carbon monoxide, nitric oxide, and methyl chloride, all generated by the smoldering films. Their faces turned yellowish-brown within minutes as they suffocated. Further complicating response to the fire, nitrocellulose continues to burn even while immersed in water and fighting the film-fueled fire simply caused more poisonous smoke to accumulate, raising the death toll.

Three theories were advanced for the initial ignition of the films: a high temperature steam leak from the pipe being repaired on the day of the fire destabilizing the films, inadvertent contact from a bare, hanging light bulb, or, possibly, a discarded, incompletely extinguished cigarette. A formal review by the National Board of Fire Underwriters found all three credible.

A major explosion came at a few seconds past 11:30 a.m.; a clock on the third floor balcony stopped at that time. After the hollow center of the building was filled with poisonous gas, another large explosion shattered a skylight at the peak of the building's atrium. The skylight explosion was a mixed blessing. The force of the explosion sent the vapors throughout the clinic, but also provided a large opening in the center of the building which allowed the toxic gas to escape. Many of the building's occupants succumbed in stairways while attempting to exit the Clinic.

The first alarm reached the fire department shortly after the explosion at 11:30 a.m. The responding fire company subsequently called in two other fire units to battle the fire. Initially, the building's windows were obscured by the toxic gas. It was not until the second large explosion blew out the skylight, and the gas began to dissipate, that the fire companies realized how many people were still in the building. Efforts to rescue the injured and recover the dying proceeded apace. By 1:15 p.m., the fire was extinguished and the building was empty.

== Aftermath ==
The four story original clinic building, the site of so much disaster, though literally overshadowed by many newer surrounding hospital and research facilities, still stands. Under the current (as of 2022) CCF naming system it is designated building "T." The building's lobby contains a small exhibit memorializing the 1929 fire.

Despite the heavy loss of life, firemen estimated the property damage at only $50,000 (equivalent to $938,000 in 2025).

According to investigators, the Cleveland Clinic was not at fault for the fire. Nonetheless, the disaster was responsible for influencing significant changes to firefighting techniques. The city of Cleveland issued gas masks to its fire departments and proposed a city ambulance service. Nationally, the disaster prompted medical facilities to establish standards for the storage of nitrocellulose film and other hazardous materials.

Some historians have argued that the Cleveland Clinic fire was also a catalyst for the development of non-flammable, non-toxic chlorofluorocarbon refrigerants. Nevertheless, most of the deaths were from breathing carbon monoxide and nitric oxide rather than methyl chloride itself, and even at the time of the disaster chemical companies were aware of the hazards of existing refrigerants.
