= Tom L. Johnson =

American politician (1854–1911)

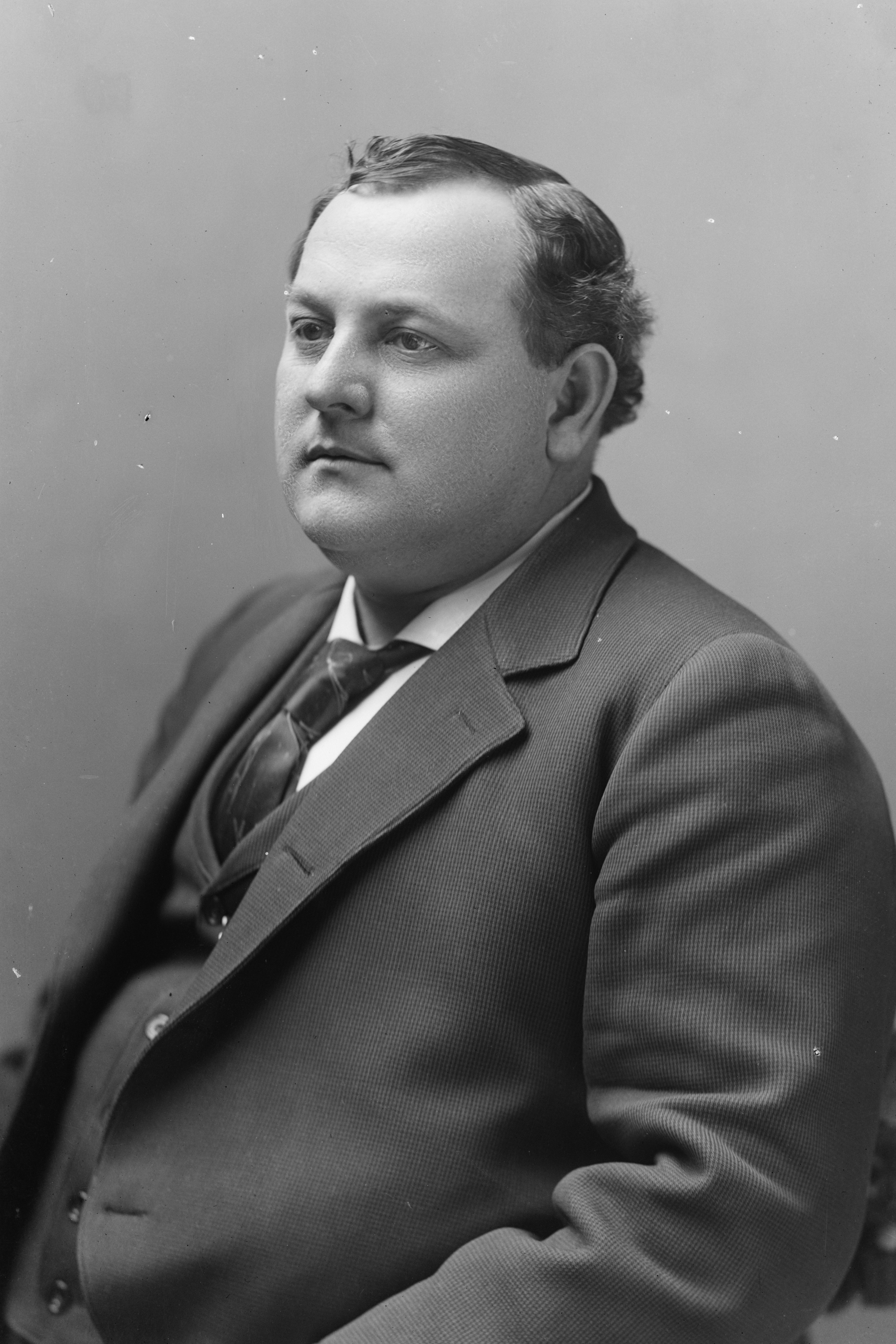
- Portrait by C. M. Bell, c. 1891–1894

35th Mayor of Cleveland
- In office January 1, 1901 – December 31, 1909
- Preceded by: John H. Farley
- Succeeded by: Herman C. Baehr

Member of the U.S. House of Representatives from Ohio's 21st district
- In office March 4, 1891 – March 3, 1895
- Preceded by: Theodore E. Burton
- Succeeded by: Theodore E. Burton

Personal details
- Born: Tom Loftin Johnson; July 18, 1854 Georgetown, Kentucky, US
- Died: April 10, 1911 (aged 56) Cleveland, Ohio, US
- Resting place: Green-Wood Cemetery, Brooklyn, N.Y.
- Party: Democratic
- Profession: Industrialist and politician

Tom Loftin Johnson (July 18, 1854 – April 10, 1911) was an American industrialist, Georgist politician, and important figure of the Progressive Era and a pioneer in urban political and social reform. He was a U.S. representative from 1891 to 1895 and mayor of Cleveland for four terms from 1901 to 1909.

Reforms during his tenure as mayor included paving hundreds of miles of streets, socializing rubbish collection, starting a street cleaning force, establishing a modern building code, and the creation of the Cleveland Mall. In 1993, a panel of scholars ranked him second among the ten best mayors in American history.

== Life ==
=== Early life ===
Tom Johnson was born in Georgetown, Kentucky on July 18, 1854. Johnson's father, a wealthy cotton planter with lands in Kentucky and Arkansas, served in the Confederate Army in the American Civil War. The war ruined the family financially, and they were forced to move to several locations in the South in search of work. By age 11, Johnson was selling newspapers on the railroads in Staunton, Virginia, and providing a substantial part of the family's support. He worked all through his youth, and never had more than one complete year of formal education.

=== Business career ===
Johnson's break came through an old family connection with the industrial du Pont dynasty. In 1869, the brothers A.V. and Bidermann du Pont gave him a clerk's job on the street railway business they had acquired in Louisville. Johnson rose rapidly in the business, and discovered a taste for the mechanical side of it. He patented several inventions, including an improved type of streetcar rail, and the glass-sided farebox still used on many buses today.

By 1876, thanks partly to royalties from his farebox, Johnson was able to strike out on his own, purchasing a controlling share in the street railways of Indianapolis. In the 1880s and 90s he expanded his interests to lines in Cleveland, St. Louis, Brooklyn and Detroit, and also entered the steel business, building mills in Lorain, Ohio, and Johnstown, Pennsylvania, to provide rails for streetcar tracks. He moved to Cleveland in 1883 and soon afterwards bought a mansion on the "Millionaire's Row" of Euclid Avenue.

=== Family ===
Johnson's brother Albert was also prominent in the streetcar business. In 1889, he became the financial backer and organizer of the Players' League, a baseball major league begun by the players themselves, in order to get a fair share of profits.

A cousin, Henry V. Johnson, was Mayor of Denver, and Henry's son, the like-named Tom Loftin Johnson, was a noted artist.

=== Death and burial ===
He died in Cleveland in 1911, and was buried next to Henry George in Brooklyn's Green-Wood Cemetery.

== Politics and philosophy ==
Johnson was one of the most well known, vocal, and dedicated admirers of Henry George's views on political economy and anti-monopoly reform.

Two chance events helped spark Johnson's interest in politics and social questions, and convert him from a conventional business tycoon to a radical reformer. The first was reading, on the suggestion of a train conductor, George's Social Problems, in which the political philosopher expounded his belief that poverty and misery were a result of society's newly created wealth becoming locked up in increasing land values, and advocating a Single Tax on land in place of wastefully taxing the productive activity of capital and labor.

Johnson then became consumed by the arguments George made in Progress and Poverty; he read and reread it, finally requesting assistance from his business associates to find flaws in George's reasoning. Johnson took the book to his lawyer and said, "I must get out of the business, or prove that this book is wrong. Here, Russell, is a retainer of five hundred dollars [$13,000 in 2015]. I want you to read this book and give me your honest opinion on it, as you would on a legal question. Treat this retainer as you would a fee." Johnson then sought out George in New York at the first possible opportunity, and the two became close friends and political collaborators. Johnson abandoned his business of rail monopoly and spent much of his fortune promoting the ideas of Henry George.

The second event was being present to witness the terrible Johnstown Flood of 1889. Johnson and his business partner Arthur Moxham organized the immediate relief activities in the stricken, leaderless city. Interpreting the events through a Georgist lens, the experience left him with a deep resentment of what he called 'Privilege'. The disaster had been caused by the improper maintenance of a dam holding a private recreational lake, owned by Henry Clay Frick and other Pittsburgh industrialists, who escaped all responsibility for it. More than that, to Johnson, the flood exemplified the inadequacy of charity and weak "remedial measures" to solve society's problems.

== Political career ==
=== Congress ===
When Johnson went into politics, "he went in on the explicit advice of Henry George." Johnson mounted an unsuccessful campaign for the U.S. House of Representatives in 1888, and then won the seat in 1890, serving two terms. He promoted free trade and the Single Tax idea, and was a useful moderate on the divisive currency question. In 1892, Johnson and his allies read Henry George's Protection or Free Trade, in its entirety, into the Congressional Record, and franked it to millions of constituents. Protectionist members responded by entering Robert Percival Porter's Free-Trade Folly and D. G. Harriman's American Tariffs from Plymouth Rock to McKinley. The escalation inspired a limit to the length of insertions to the Congressional Record without unanimous consent.

In 1894, Johnson was one of six congressmen to vote in favor of a single tax amendment to the Wilson–Gorman Tariff Act. Proposed by fellow Democrat and Georgist James G. Maguire of California, it was intended as a substitute for the bill's proposed income tax. It would have levied a direct tax of $31,311,125 on land values nationwide. After this was rejected, Simpson voted in favor of the original version of the bill, but against the final version sent back by the Senate several months later.

=== After Congress ===
The issue of privilege gradually made Johnson reconsider his own business career. "Traction" (streetcar) companies depended on route franchises granted by city councils; political connections and payoffs gave favored companies the upper hand. In an era when most everyone rode the cars, the stakes were high, and battles for franchises were often the hidden issue behind cities' factional strife.

Johnson knew the game intimately; in his speeches declaiming against the evils of the streetcar barons, he always pointed out that he could speak with authority, because he was one of them himself. In Cleveland, he came into conflict early with Mark Hanna, the powerful local businessman who by 1894 would be the leading power broker of the Republican Party, the man credited with putting fellow Ohioan William McKinley in the White House.

Johnson's streetcar fights with Hanna and his allies make a colorful part of Cleveland political folklore. In a time when companies with a monopoly of transport on a route were able to charge five cents for a ride, he made the 'three-cent fare' a cornerstone of his populist philosophy, and later he would come out in favor of complete public ownership. Through the 1890s Johnson gradually divested himself of most of his transit and steel holdings, to devote himself entirely to the politics of reform.

=== Campaign for mayor ===
In 1901, pressed on by influential citizens and a public petition, he decided to run for mayor of Cleveland.

His campaign electrified the city. Johnson liked to rent large circus tents and set them up on neighborhood lots, attracting big crowds for whom he would deliver a powerful speech, banter cheerfully with hecklers, and finish with a stereopticon show with a political moral. On April 1, 1901, he was elected with 54% of the vote.

=== Mayor of Cleveland ===
Johnson's entry into office would prove just as dramatic as his campaign. One of the campaign issues had been a valuable piece of city-owned downtown lakefront property, which outgoing mayor John H. Farley and the council had agreed to hand over to the railroads without compensation. Johnson obtained a court injunction to stop the giveaway, but it was set to expire three days after the election. Taking advantage of a legal technicality to get the new mayor sworn in early, Johnson's men staged a surprise takeover of City Hall and saved the land for the city. Today, this land, with later landfill additions, holds Cleveland Browns Stadium, the Rock and Roll Hall of Fame and the Great Lakes Science Center.

Securing a bipartisan reform majority in the city council allowed Johnson to effect major changes in every department of city government. Some of his policies were true innovations, while others mirrored those of the two other notable Progressive Midwestern mayors of the era, Hazen S. Pingree of Detroit and Samuel 'Golden Rule' Jones of Toledo.

In the judgment of one urban historian, "Johnson was a superb municipal technician. He grasped not only the ethics but the mathematics of government." The new administration paved hundreds of miles of streets and expanded the city's park system, building a large number of playgrounds, ball fields and other facilities. To popular acclaim, the mayor tore up all the 'Keep off the Grass' signs in the city parks, a symbol of his belief in changing parklands' role from passive to active recreation.

Rubbish collection, then in private hands, had been a big campaign issue. Johnson eliminated the haulers' franchises and replaced them with a municipal department. He hired back all the men who had lost their jobs, which resulted in better performance and lower costs for the public service. In keeping with the administration's focus on public health, a street cleaning force was started, and the city's Water Department was depoliticized and vastly improved. Public bathhouses were built in the poorest neighborhoods; some of these buildings survive today. Johnson also began work on the monumental West Side Market, one of Cleveland's best-known landmarks.

To improve housing conditions, the administration established the country's first comprehensive modern building code in 1904. The code became a model for many U.S. cities. As Director of Charities and Correction, Johnson appointed his own pastor, Harris R. Cooley. Under Cooley, the city purchased a huge tract of farmland in Warrensville Township, where a new City Workhouse was established on humanitarian principles, along with cottages for the indigent elderly and a sanatorium.

Cleveland's civic center, a spacious park surrounded by public buildings, called simply 'The Mall' was the physical symbol of Johnson's revolution in government. The origins of the 'Group Plan' went back to a competition held by the Cleveland Architectural Club in 1895, but it was Johnson who pushed the appropriations through, and brought in a team headed by Daniel Burnham, the nation's leading planner, to design it. In an idealistic age, civic centers like this were consciously meant to be an architectural expression of democratic ideals. Burnham, who had created the Court of Honor at the World's Columbian Exposition in Chicago and designed the restoration of the National Mall in Washington, D.C., brought the City Beautiful movement of the era to Cleveland. Work on the Mall and its ensemble of public buildings continued well into the 1930s.

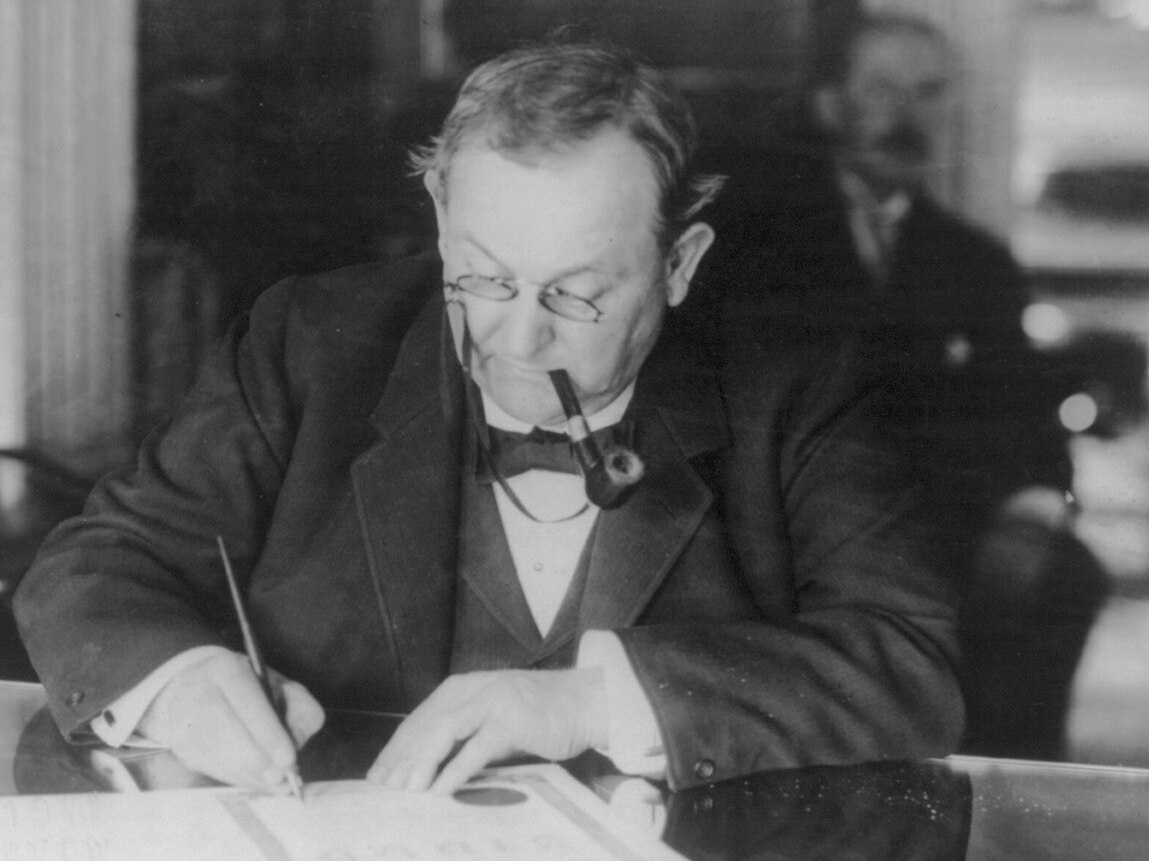
Tom Loftin Johnson in 1907 at his desk

Throughout the decade, the transit wars continued unabated. By 1903, the Hanna interests, the lines formerly run by Johnson, and others were consolidated into the Cleveland Electric Railway Company, a private near-monopoly opposed only by the Johnson-supported Municipal Traction Company, offering a three-cent fare. Seven years of conflict exhausted both firms and forced them into receivership. In 1910, voters approved a compromise plan called the 'Tayler Grant' under which Cleveland Electric Railway would lease the lines from the city and be assured of a 6% return. Though the new arrangement worked well for decades, it was seen as a defeat for Johnson.

Johnson took up the cause of municipal ownership not only in streetcars, but electric power, to bring down rates by offering competition to the monopoly private utility. He founded the Municipal Light and Power Company, and though political opposition kept him from expanding it, the next Progressive mayor, Newton D. Baker, built a new plant that opened in 1914 as the biggest public utility in the U.S. "Muny Light" (now Cleveland Public Power) brought important savings on the city's own electric bills, and those of residents fortunate enough to have access to the service, while it forced the private competitor to keep its own rates low.

In a booming city that had been predominantly Republican, fiscally frugal, and business-oriented for decades, Johnson's policies made him an extremely divisive figure. As his associate Frederic C. Howe put it, it was a "Ten Years' War", and people were either strongly for the mayor or strongly against him. In winning his four terms, Johnson depended heavily on the vote from ethnic neighborhoods on the West Side, where his three-cent fare streetcars operated. In the middle and upper-class sections of the East Side, opponents railed against policies they called expensive and "socialistic", pointing out that after only five years Johnson had nearly doubled the city's debt.

The tenacious opposition of the Republicans and the business interests kept most of Johnson's big plans tied up in legal battles. By 1909, Clevelanders were becoming increasingly weary of reform and endless political fights, and Johnson was defeated for re-election by a relatively obscure Republican, Herman C. Baehr. Having ruined his health and dissipated his considerable fortune in the cause of reform, Johnson lived just long enough to dictate his autobiography, My Story.

== Legacy ==
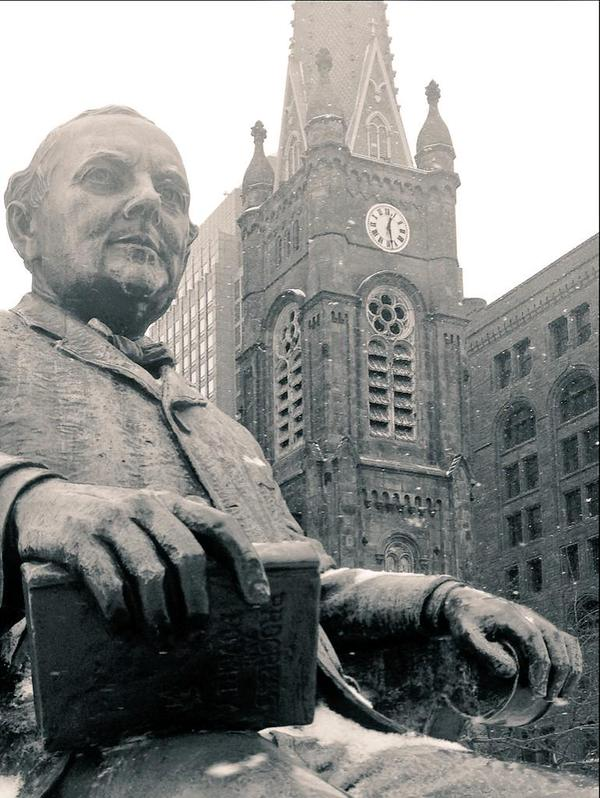
Statue of Tom Johnson holding Henry George's Progress and Poverty

The revolution in government that Johnson effected in Cleveland made him a national figure. The noted muckraking journalist Lincoln Steffens called him "the best Mayor of the best-governed city in the United States." A 1993 survey of historians, political scientists and urban experts conducted by Melvin G. Holli of the University of Illinois at Chicago saw Johnson ranked as the second-best American big-city mayor to serve between the years 1820 and 1993. Only Fiorello La Guardia of New York City placed higher.

== See also ==
- Cleveland Traction Wars

== Works ==
- My Story (1913)

== Sources and further reading ==
- Bremner, Robert H. "The Civic Revival in Ohio: Reformed Businessman: Tom L. Johnson." American Journal of Economics and Sociology 8.3 (1949): 299–309.
- Briggs, Robert L. "The Progressive Era in Cleveland, Ohio: Tom L. Johnson's Administration, 1901-1909" (PhD dissertation, University of Chicago; Proquest Dissertations Publishing, 1962. T-09573).
- DeMatteo, Arthur E. "The Downfall of a Progressive: Mayor Tom L. Johnson and the Cleveland Streetcar Strike of 1908." Ohio History 104 (1995): 24–41.
- Johannesen, Eric, Cleveland Architecture 1876–1976. Western Reserve Historical Society, 1979.
- Lorenz, Carl, Tom L. Johnson, Mayor of Cleveland. A.S. Barnes, 1911 online
- Lough, Alexandra W. "Tom L. Johnson and Cleveland Traction Wars, 1901–1909." American Journal of Economics and Sociology 75.1 (2016): 149–192.
- Megery, Michael. "Ideological Origins of a Radical Democrat: The Early Political Thought of Tom L. Johnson, 1888–1895." Middle West Review 6.1 (2019): 37–61.
- Miggins, Edward M. "A City of Uplifting Influences: From Sweet Charity to Modern Social Welfare and Philanthropy." In The Birth of Modern Cleveland, 1865–1930, edited by Thomas F. Campbell and Edward M. Miggins, (Western Reserve Historical Society, 1988) pp 141–71.
- Murdock, Eugene C. Tom Johnson of Cleveland (Wright State University Press, 1994), a standard scholarly biography.
- Rose, William Ganson. Cleveland, The Making of a City. World Publishing, 1950. online
- Suit, William Wilson. "Tom Loftin Johnson, businessman reformer' (PhD dissertation, Kent State University ProQuest Dissertations Publishing, 1988. 8827177).
- Van Tassel, David and Grabowski, John J., editors, The Encyclopedia Of Cleveland History . Case Western Reserve University and the Western Reserve Historical Society.
- Warner, Hoyt Landon. Progressivism in Ohio, 1897–1917 (Ohio State University Press, 1964).
- Whitehair, Andrew L., "Tom L. Johnson’s Tax School: the Fight For Democracy And Control of Cleveland’s Tax Machinery" (2020). (ETD Archive. 1190. online

=== Primary sources ===
- Howe, Frederic C., Confessions of a Reformer. Scribner 1925; reprint Kent State University Press, 1988.
- Johnson, Tom L.. My Story. B. W. Huebsch, 1911; reprint Kent State University Press 1993. Text also online at the Cleveland Memory Project.

=== External links ===
- United States Congress. "Tom L. Johnson (id: J000178)". Biographical Directory of the United States Congress.
- Tom L. Johnson materials at teachingcleveland.org
- Text of Henry George's Social Problems at the Internet Archive
- The history of Cleveland Public Power

Political offices
Preceded by John H. Farley	Mayor of Cleveland; 1901–1909	Succeeded by Herman C. Baehr
U.S. House of Representatives
Preceded by Theodore E. Burton	U.S. Representative from Ohio's 21st congressional district 1891–1895	Succeeded by Theodore E. Burton
Party political offices
Preceded by James Kilbourne	Democratic Party nominee for Governor of Ohio; 1903	Succeeded by John M. Pattison
