= WHKW =

Christian radio station in Cleveland, Ohio

- Cleveland, Ohio; United States
- Broadcast area: Greater Cleveland
- Frequency: 1220 kHz
- Branding: AM 1220 The Word

Programming
- Language: English
- Format: Christian radio
- Affiliations: Salem Radio Network

Ownership
- Owner: Salem Media Group; (Salem Communications Holding Corporation)
- Sister stations: WHK

History
- First air date: December 15, 1930
- Former call signs: WGAR (1930–1990); WKNR (1990–2001); WHKC (2001); WHK (2001–2005); WHKZ (2005)
- Former frequencies: 1450 kHz (1930–1941); 1480 kHz (1941–1944)
- Call sign meaning: Artifact of previous WHK call sign

Technical information
- Licensing authority: FCC
- Facility ID: 14772
- Class: B
- Power: 50,000 watts (unlimited)
- Transmitter coordinates: 41°18′26.19″N 81°41′20.46″W
- Translator: 96.9 W245CY (Cleveland)

Links
- Public license information: Public file; LMS
- Webcast: Listen Live
- Website: thewordcleveland.com

WHKW (1220 AM, "The Word") is a commercial radio station licensed to Cleveland, Ohio, United States, featuring a Christian radio format. Owned by Salem Media Group, the station serves both Greater Cleveland and much of surrounding Northeast Ohio. WHKW's studios are located in Independence and its transmitter is in neighboring Broadview Heights. Along with a standard analog transmission, WHKW is relayed over low-power Cleveland translator W245CY (96.9 FM) and streamed online.

This station was launched on December 15, 1930, as WGAR, a merger of two separate radio stations that operated in a frequency timeshare—WFJC in Akron and WCSO in Springfield— and were moved to Cleveland. Under the ownership of George A. Richards' Goodwill Station group, WGAR became a core affiliate of the CBS Radio Network, the originating station for Wings Over Jordan and an early home to comedian Jack Paar. Reflecting Richards' reactionary conservative beliefs, Fr. Charles Coughlin's weekly broadcasts originated on WGAR throughout the 1930s until the outbreak of World War II. WGAR moved to its current dial position of 1220 AM in 1944, and increased power to 50,000 watts in 1947. Richards became embroiled in a lengthy license dispute with the Federal Communications Commission over accusations of news manipulation and bias that, while centered around his Los Angeles station, placed all of his stations at risk of license revocation. This dispute ended with Richards' death in 1951; two years later, his widow sold WGAR to Peoples Broadcasting, the forerunner to Nationwide Communications.

WGAR transitioned into a personality-driven adult contemporary format in 1970, headlined by personalities Don Imus, John Lanigan, Norm N. Nite and Chuck Collier. While among the higher-rated stations in the Cleveland market throughout the 1970s, WGAR began to falter against stiff competition, primarily on the FM dial. Lanigan left the station in 1984; later that year, WGAR flipped to satellite-delivered country music while its FM adjunct, which had a locally-programmed country format, was renamed WGAR-FM (99.5). By 1986, WGAR simulcast WGAR-FM outright. Nationwide spun off WGAR in 1990, which was renamed WKNR; with Cablevision as a backing investor and eventually the majority owner, WKNR soft launched a sports format over the course of a year. WKNR was the flagship for the Cleveland Indians from 1992 through 1997 and was co-flagship for the Cleveland Browns from 1994 until the team relocated to Baltimore. WKNR changed ownership multiple times between 1997 and 2000, and was ultimately purchased by Salem Communications. Under Salem, 1220 AM assumed WHK (1420 AM)'s callsign and Christian format on July 3, 2001, as the result of a complex radio station/intellectual property asset swap. Since 2005, this station has been known as WHKW. From 2001 to 2019, 1220 AM was simulcast with WHKZ in Warren for the Youngstown market.

== Prior history as WCSO and WFJC ==
WHKW has traditionally dated its debut to December 15, 1930, when it made its first formal broadcast as WGAR. However, WGAR's formation was the result of the consolidation of two existing stations, WCSO in Springfield, Ohio, and WFJC in Akron, Ohio, which both started in the early 1920s.

WCSO was first licensed as WNAP, on October 13, 1922, to Wittenberg College in Springfield, operating on the standard "entertainment" wavelength of 360 meters (833 kHz). The station's call letters were changed to WCSO—for Wittenberg College, Springfield, Ohio—on March 6, 1925.

WFJC's first license, for 100 watts on 1210 kHz, was issued in May 1924 under the station's original call sign, WDBK, to the M. F. Broz Furniture, Hardware & Radio Company at 13918 Union Avenue in Cleveland's Mount Pleasant neighborhood. It began broadcasting on May 15, 1924. WDBK was deleted in the fall of 1924, then relicensed the following spring, again with 100 watts, but now on 1320 kHz. Automobile dealer W. F. Jones purchased WDBK on July 15, 1927, and was granted a permit to move WDBK, which was renamed WFJC, to Akron.

== WGAR (1930–1990) ==
George A. Richards, Leo J. Fitzpatrick and P. M. Thomas—owners of WJR in Detroit—incorporated the WGAR Broadcasting Company to establish "Cleveland's fourth radio station". On September 6, the company filed an application with the Federal Radio Commission (FRC) for authorization to "consolidate stations WFJC and WCSO into a new station with new equipment at Cleveland Ohio", which was approved that same month. The WGAR Broadcasting Company took over ownership of WCSO on September 26, 1930, later recognized as a casualty of the Great Depression. WFJC was acquired seven days earlier, the deal was approved despite opposition from the chambers of commerce for both Akron and Cleveland, in addition to local community groups and competing Cleveland radio stations. WCSO made its final broadcast on October 11, 1930, after coverage of the Wittenberg Tigers-Washington & Jefferson Presidents football game and its license was formally deleted at the end of the month.

As construction for the new station began immediately, WFJC continued to broadcast from Akron until December 14; the December 13, 1930, Akron Beacon Journal informed its readers that WFJC would cease operations the next day at midnight, "to make way for WGAR, at Cleveland, which purchased its claim to the ether". In its fifth annual report, the FRC reported that, effective June 12, 1931, WCSO and WFJC had been consolidated "to form new station WGAR, Cleveland, Ohio". WADC eventually moved into the Beacon Journal building studios vacated by WFJC.

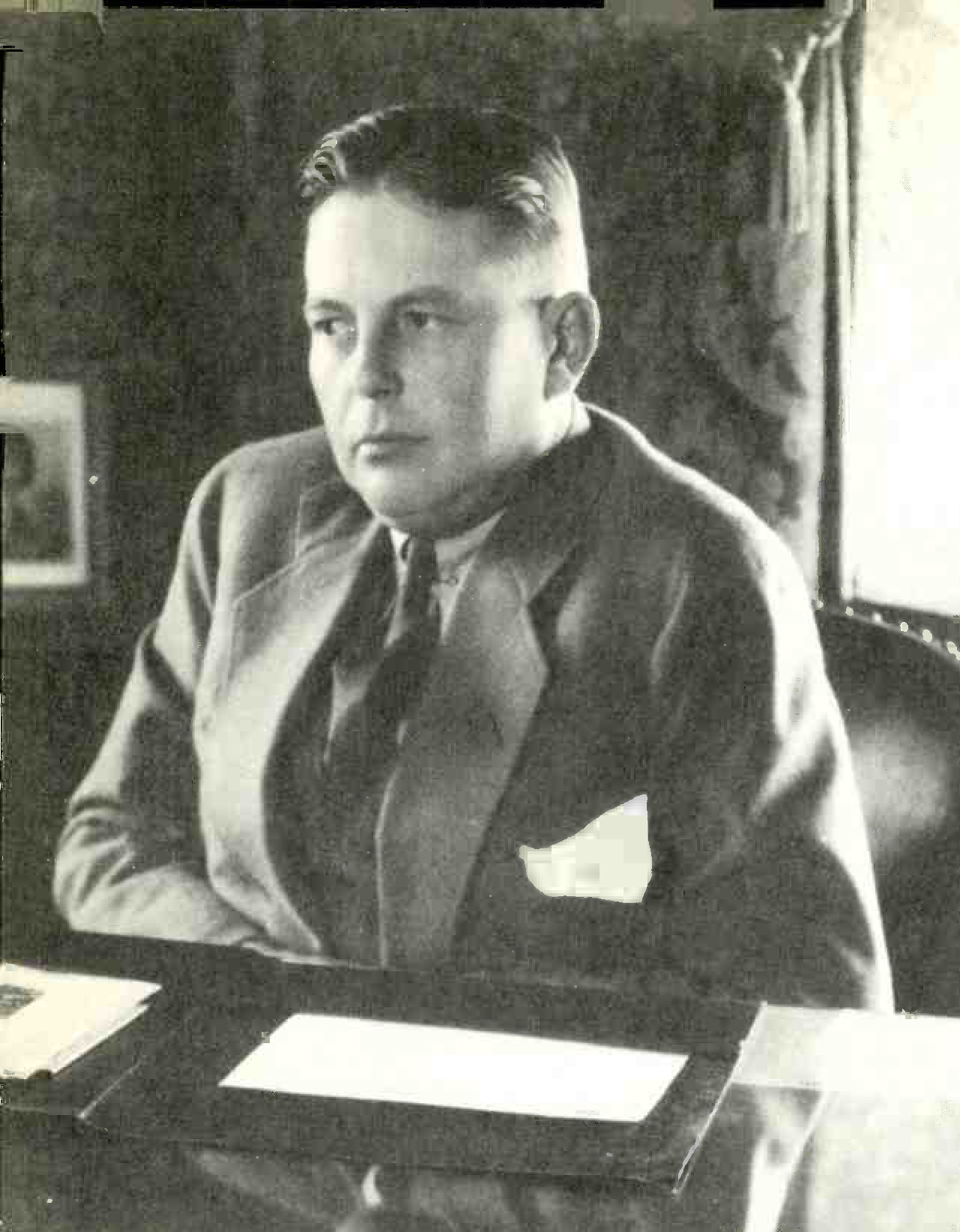
George A. Richards

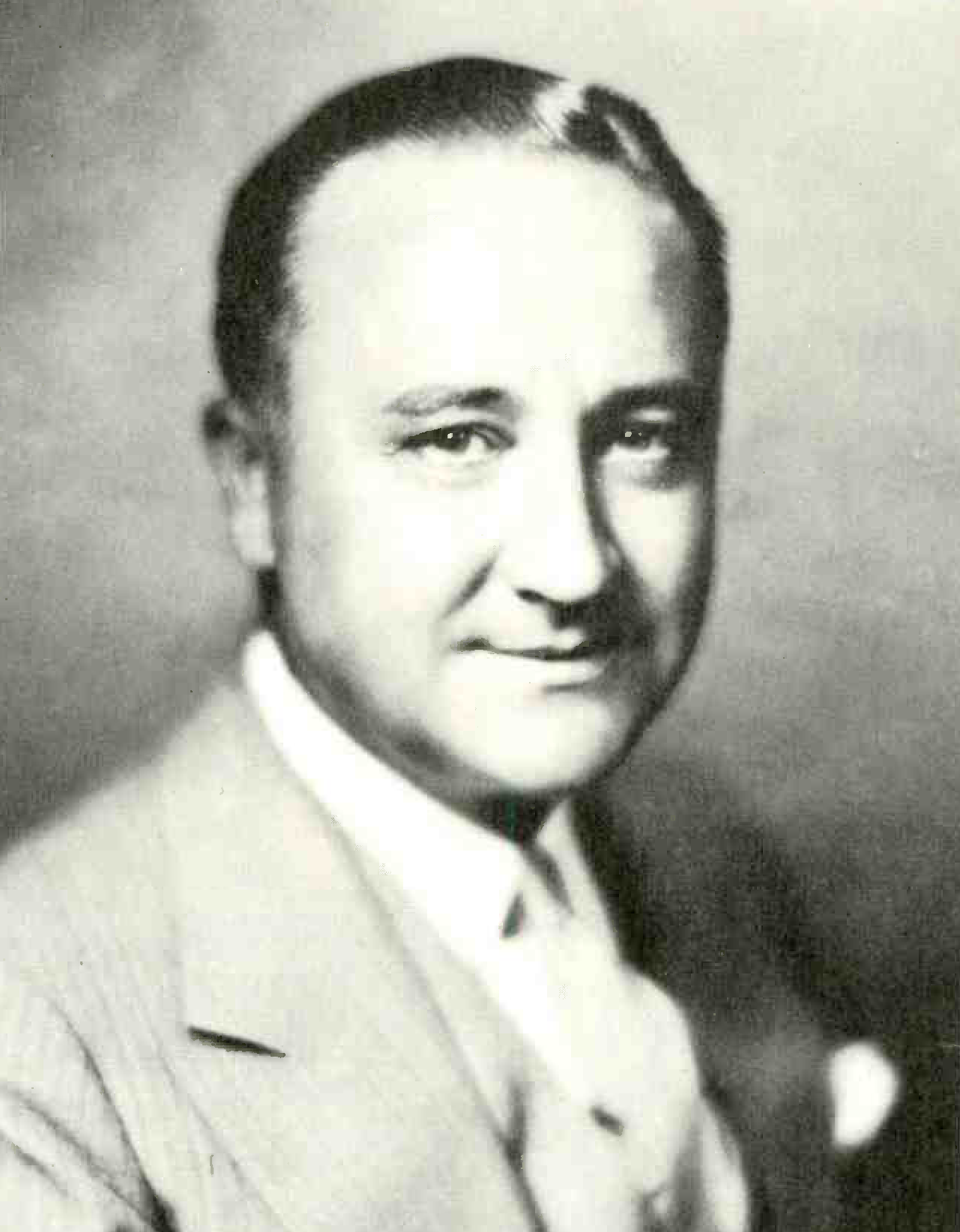
Leo J. Fitzpatrick

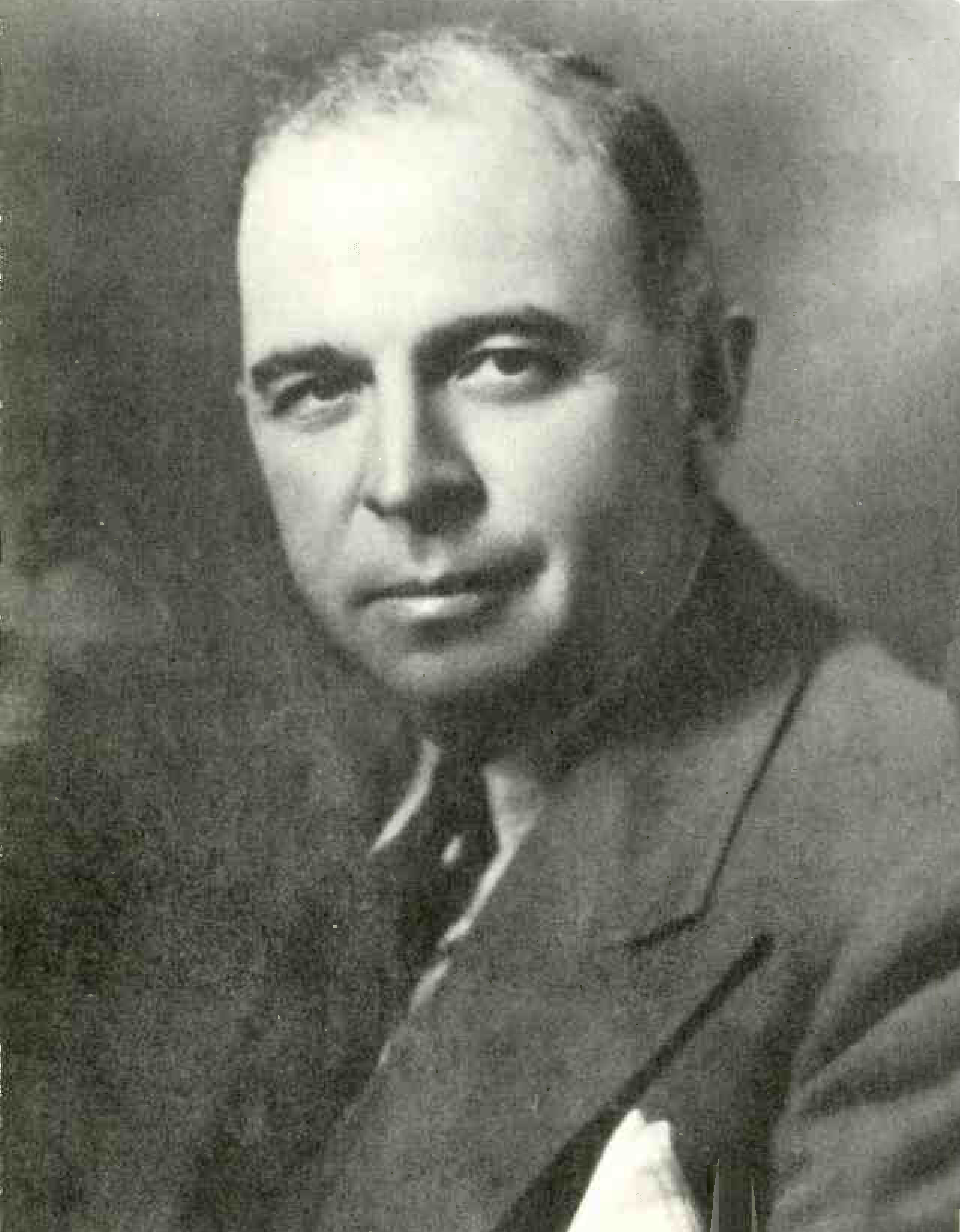
P. M. Thomas

=== "The Friendly Station" ===
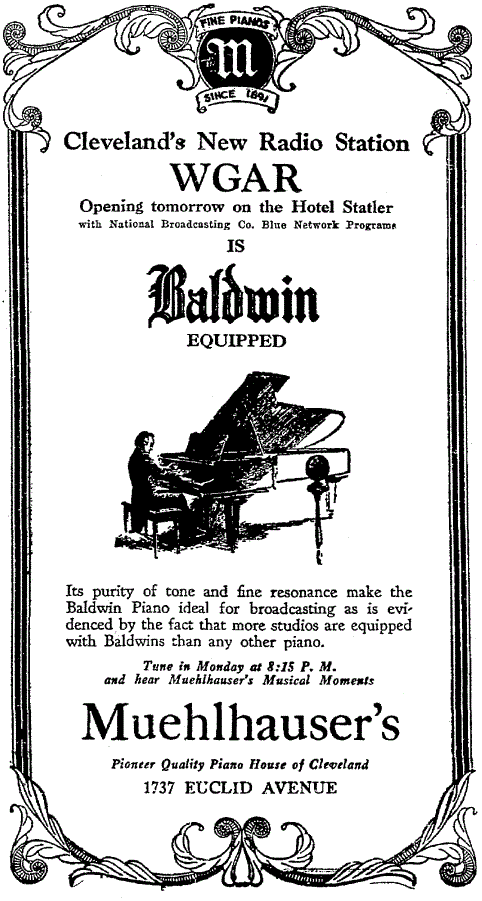
WGAR made its formal debut broadcast on December 15, 1930.

Under a separate license issued by the FRC, this combined station was named WGAR, derived from G. A. Richards; the station also now broadcast on 1450 kHz with 1,000 watts daytime and 500 watts at night. New studios were built on the 14th floor penthouse of the Hotel Statler in Downtown Cleveland. Regular programming debuted on December 15, 1930, with local speeches beginning at 6:00 p.m. before switching to NBC Blue programming with Amos 'n' Andy at 8:00. The initial plan was to move WCSO's transmitter to the Statler but due to technical issues, the debut broadcast instead was transmitted over WHK's rented auxiliary transmitter, located at the Standard Bank Building. A Beacon Journal column the next day was critical over WGAR's signal experiencing interference on multiple channels on the frequency as the evening progressed, denoting that WHK and nighttime skywave from Buffalo's WKBW were more easily accessible.

The station's transmitter was moved from the Statler to a newly constructed facility in Cuyahoga Heights on July 20, 1931, with a Blue concert by John McCormack airing after an on-air dedication, a move that partially improved reception in Akron albeit with continued interference from some listeners. In further bids to improve WGAR's signal, power was increased to 1,000 watts during daytime hours by December 1932, then to 5,000 watts during the daytime and 1,000 watts at night by 1938. WGAR and WJR were eventually joined by KMPC in Los Angeles, which Richards purchased on May 5, 1937.

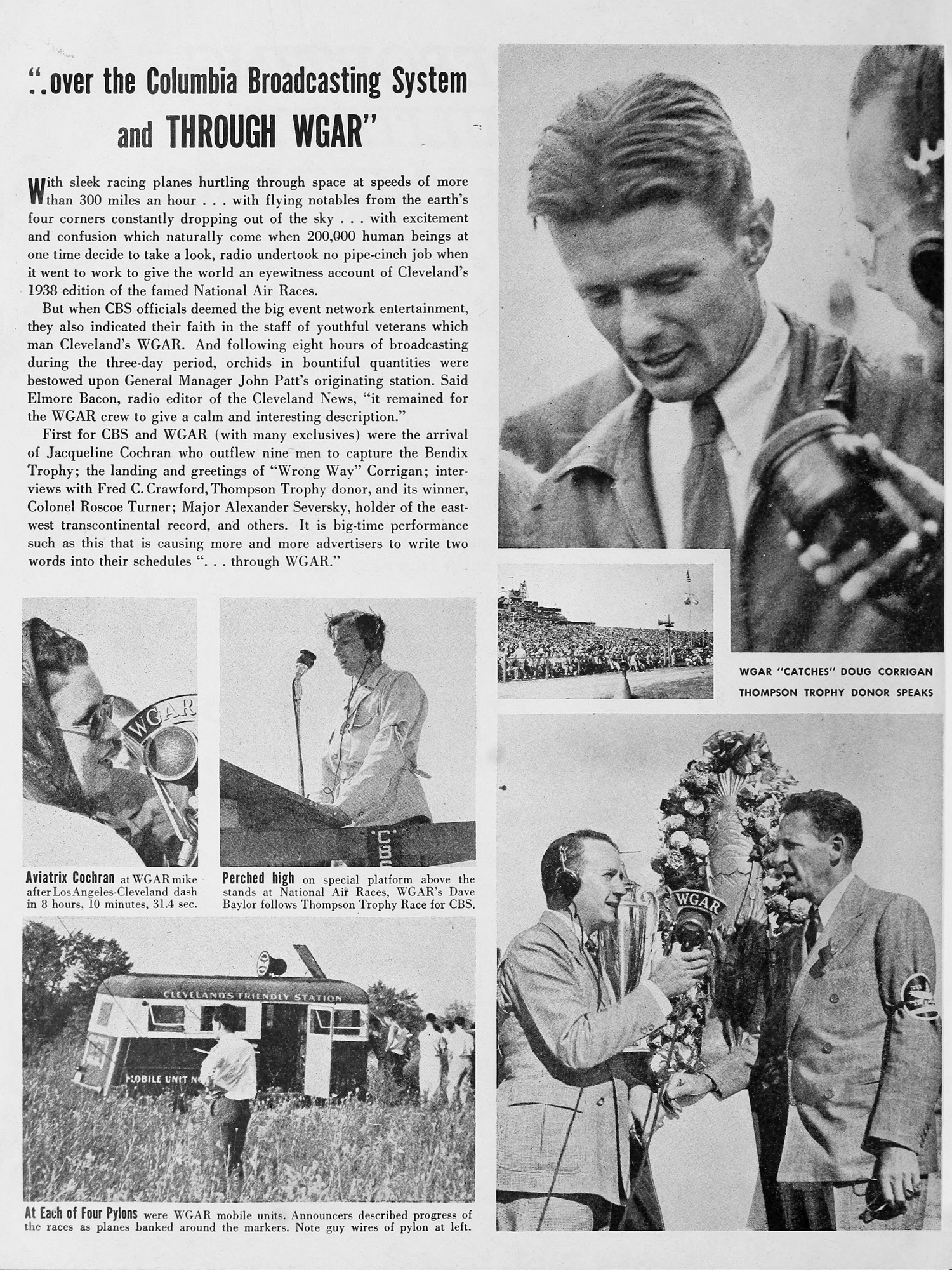
WGAR trade ad promoting coverage of the 1938 National Air Races relayed over CBS.

The station became one of the first stations in the United States, and one of the first in Cleveland, to employ a staffed news room beginning in 1936 under the direction of Ralph Worden. Worden instituted a policy of "facts, not opinion" which prevented newscasts from having any commentary, later maintained by general manager John Patt. Originally with two reporters on staff, the news department grew to three staffers in 1943 and to four in 1945, and contracted for a news bureau in Washington, D.C. during World War II; WGAR also became one of the first radio stations to play recorded sound bites during newscasts. The station's coverage of events during World War II included multiple weekly programs—ranging from anthologies to light entertainment and dramatic fare—that encouraged patriotism, support of the war effort and bond drives. Program director David Baylor and operations manager Carl George were both dispatched to the European and Pacific theaters, respectively, filing news reports for the station.

In addition to NBC Blue programming, WGAR started to feature assorted fare from the Quality Network and its successor, the Mutual Broadcasting System. A round-robin affiliation swap with Columbia Broadcasting System (CBS) affiliate WHK and independent WJAY on September 26, 1937, saw WGAR became Cleveland's new CBS affiliate; WJAY took the Mutual affiliation under new WCLE calls, while WHK took NBC Blue. Cleveland Orchestra radio broadcasts moved to WGAR on December 6, 1941, and were carried over CBS and related shortwave facilities as a sustaining program sponsored entirely by the station. WGAR and CBS's relationship with the Orchestra lasted until 1962. WGAR also originated several public affairs programs including the City Club of Cleveland's Friday Forum, which the station began carrying on October 18, 1937.

=== Father Coughlin ===
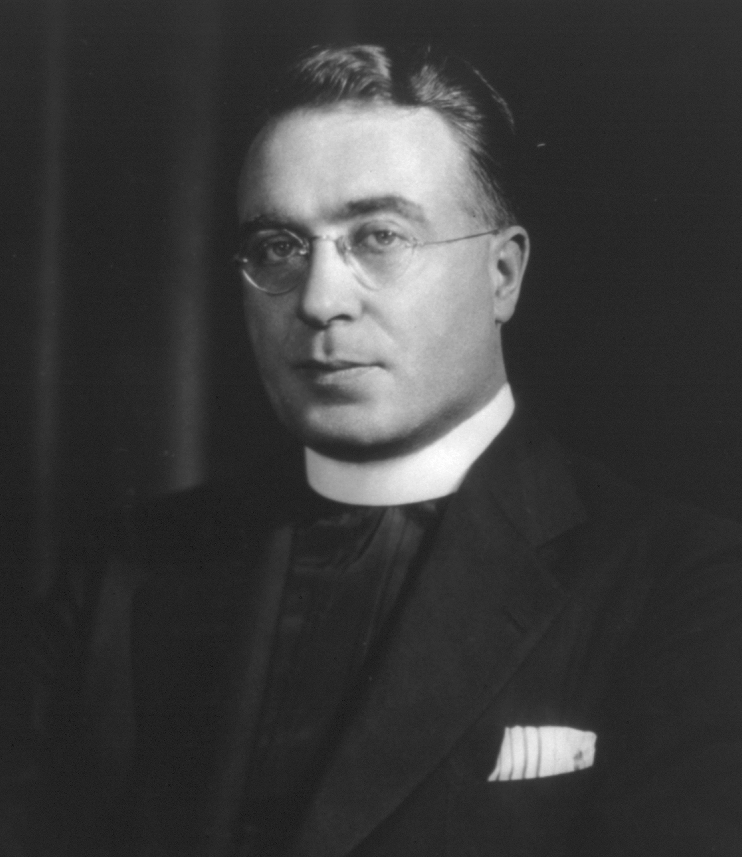
Fr. Charles Coughlin

Throughout the 1930s, WGAR carried The Golden Hour of the Little Flower, hosted by Roman Catholic priest Fr. Charles Coughlin, a close friend of George A. Richards. Coughlin's career in radio preceded Richards' 1929 purchase of WJR but Richards encouraged Fr. Coughlin to eschew religious topics in favor of political commentary. CBS carried The Golden Hour in 1930 but dropped it after several affiliates objected to Coughlin's views and the network requested advance scripts of his sermons. This led Coughlin to establish a network of his own, financially backed by Richards and with WJR and WGAR as core stations. In August 1932, it boasted 25 affiliates (Note: WADC also carried the program locally but dropped it by 1934.) and grew to 58 affiliates by 1938, regarded at the time as the largest independently-run radio network in the U.S.

Fr. Coughlin attained notoriety for anti-capitalist and anti-Semitic views and accusing bankers of causing the Great Depression; such rhetoric directly mirrored that of Richards, who was a reactionary conservative. Initially supporting President Franklin D. Roosevelt and his economic policies, Fr. Coughlin broke ranks outright to form the National Union for Social Justice (NUSJ), predicting electoral success in Ohio at a May 11, 1936, rally at Cleveland Municipal Stadium. Supporting Union Party presidential candidate Rep. William Lemke, Fr. Coughlin gave the Union's convention keynote address at Municipal Stadium on August 16, 1936, but fainted near the end of his speech. Coughlin also spoke at the Townsend Convention held at Cleveland Public Hall one month earlier. The Golden Hour was briefly suspended after the NUSJ underperformed at the polls in the 1936 presidential election but revived two months later.

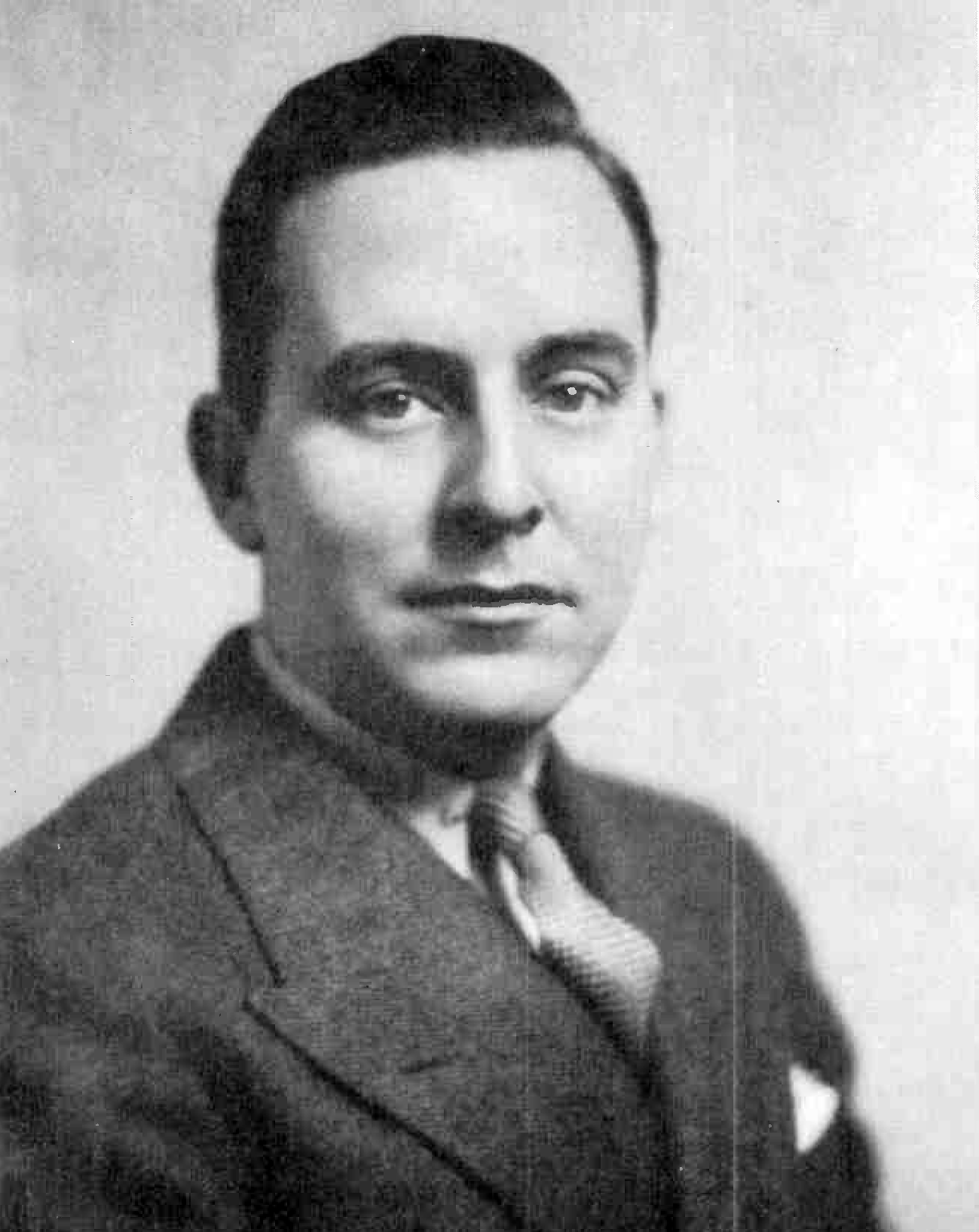
John F. Patt

Rhetoric on The Golden Hour became increasingly virulent, with Coughlin expressing conspiracy theories against Jewish people and sympathizing with Nazi Germany and Italian fascism. The outbreak of World War II in Europe prompted the National Association of Broadcasters (NAB) to adopt a self-regulating code on October 1, 1939, prohibiting member stations from airing sponsored programs that contained editorializing or controversial subjects, written with Fr. Coughlin in mind. John F. Patt, general manager for both WJR and WGAR, assailed the NARB code as "censorship and abridgement of free speech", suggesting it could lead to "an emasculation of private enterprise in broadcasting with a solar plexus blow to freedom in this country and an invitation for further government regulation". While WJR and WGAR threatened to leave the NAB in protest, (Note: WGAR and WJR ultimately abided by the NAB's code, with WGAR instituting a code of their own in 1944 that the station promoted as "higher (standards) than those established for the industry as a whole".) Patt disclosed that both stations had cancellation clauses in their contracts with Coughlin that could be exercised if necessary; the majority of affiliate contracts expired at the end of October, effectively ending the program.

=== Jack Paar ===
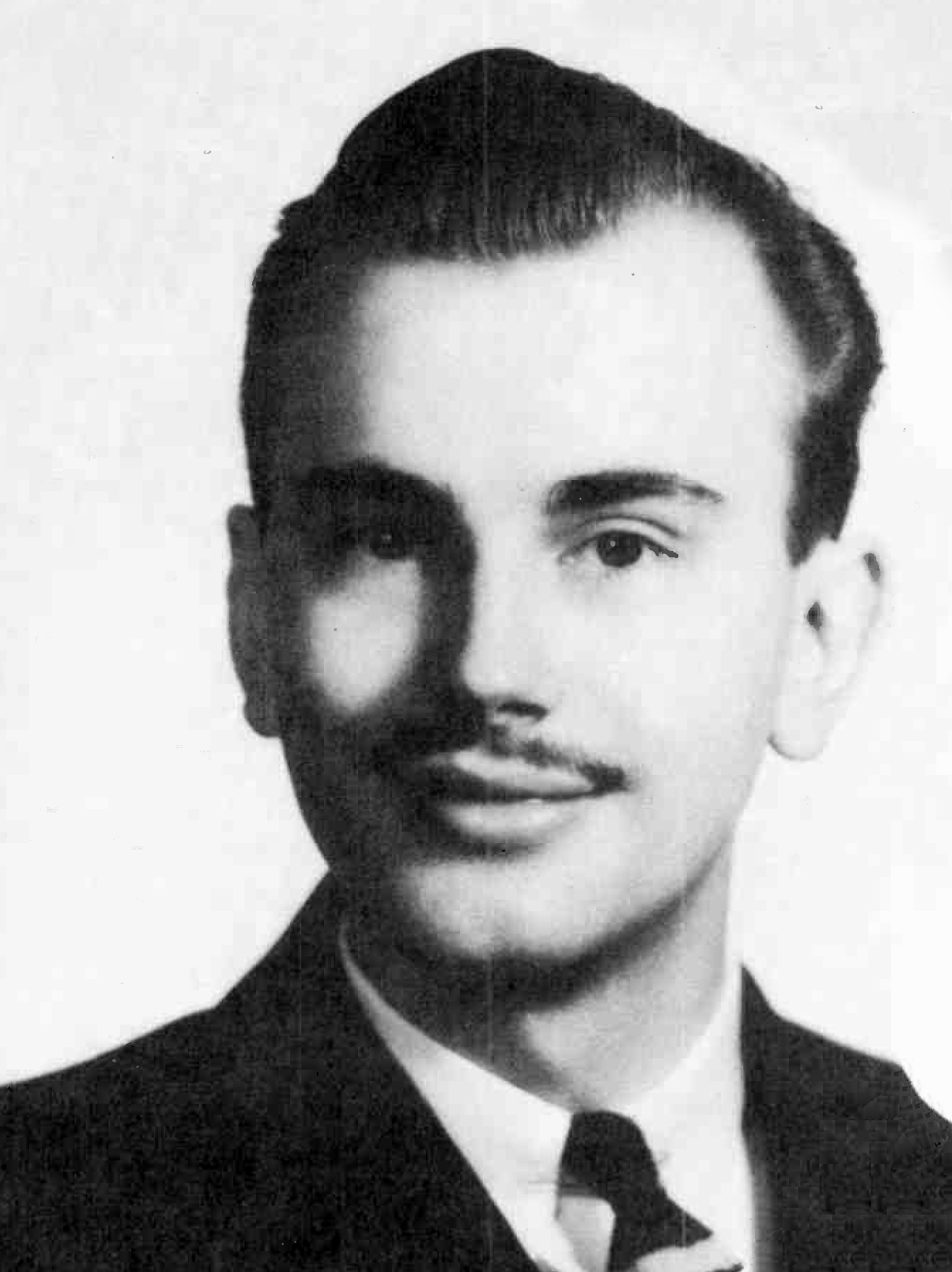
Jack Paar

The most famous of alumni to emerge from WGAR was comedian Jack Paar. A native of Canton, Paar joined the station in 1938 after prior work at Jackson, Michigan's WIBM, Indianapolis's WIRE, Pittsburgh's WCAE and Youngstown's WKBN, and was hired by WGAR announcer Wayne Mack (Vaino Mackey). Paar initially wanted to be a professional wrestler while his parents envisioned him a minister. While only making $38 a week at WGAR (equivalent to $869 in 2025) in the height of the Great Depression, Paar viewed himself as "the happiest kid in the world". Being the youngest announcer at the station, his first main task was as the Sunday afternoon booth announcer and having to field phone calls from listeners upset or angry over Fr. Coughlin's broadcasts; Paar later viewed George Richards as "a 'Citizen Kane'-type person" owing to Richards' conservative views.

One particular incident on October 30, 1938, defined Paar's early career. Aware of a new Columbia show on the Sunday evening schedule—Orson Welles's The Mercury Theatre on the Air—Paar briefly left the studios to get a snack, inadvertently missing the start of The War of the Worlds and thus unaware of a brief introduction by Welles. After an onslaught of phone calls from confused and panicked listeners who thought a real Martian invasion was taking place, an equally confused Paar interrupted the network feed twice, the first time saying "this is a drama, I think?", and a few minutes later with, "I assure you this is a drama... I am almost certain! Be calm—have I ever lied to you before?" Paar contacted general manager John Patt about the panic, Patt responded with "you're too emotional, you're never going to make it." Nevertheless, Paar was seen as a hero overnight, with newspaper coverage the next day highlighting and praising "the man who calmed Cleveland."

Some of the happiest times of my life were in Cleveland, I met some of my best friends there. Actually, any style I have derives not from Benny or Hope, but from Maury Condon and Wayne Mack, two announcers at WGAR. Maury... had a fey, leprechaun outlook on the world.

— Jack Paar

At age 20, WGAR assigned Jack Paar to narrate the station's Cleveland Orchestra broadcasts produced for CBS, thereby becoming the network's youngest announcer. He also announced a late-night big band program WGAR also originated for CBS, coining phrases "it's Tommy Tucker time", "a rhythmic New Deal with Dick Stabile" and "Swing and Sway with Sammy Kaye", quipping that "I learned to count by working with Lawrence Welk." Eddie Paul, an area bandleader who regularly appeared on the program, later would reminisce how he and Paar would "hold gab fests" afterwards. Paar attempted to use his announcer duties to court actress Doris Dudley via coded messages, only to be stopped after a CBS directive via telegram, which he saw and management never did. Paar additionally hosted an early morning entertainment gossip program that featured a daily contest to win movie tickets, and a weekly comedy program, Here's Paar; the latter featured Wayne Mack and fellow announcer Maurice Condon as his sidekicks. The popular program both showcased Paar's talents and informed them at the same time: one episode had Mack inadvertently hanging up on Paar when he called into the station from jail, Condon jokingly claimed later that Paar's overnight prison sentence was for an overdue library book.

After nearly four years at the station, Paar was fired near the end of 1942. (Note: The exact incident is unclear. Paar claimed to have joked too loudly during a staff meeting after Richards announced employee bonuses were instead being invested into rail transport, while Maurice Condon claimed that an annual employees' picnic went awry after Paar—who was the master of ceremonies—joked about the employees' wives wanting to be close to John Patt's wife.) Despite his eventual success as a pioneering late-night television talk show host and as the second host of NBC-TV's Tonight Show, Paar never got over his firing and claimed to suffer weekly nightmares about it into the 1980s. Paar purchased Portland, Maine station WMTW-TV in 1963, outbidding his former boss John Patt in the process, later musing, "I survived and could at this moment buy WGAR if I wished." During Paar's 1961 career apex hosting Tonight, Condon denied that he taught Paar everything he knew about show business, but jokingly added, "well, I did show Jack around." Wayne Mack remained at WGAR until 1950, when he left to help launch WDOK (1260 AM), and continued to broadcast in some capacity until his death in 2000.

=== Wings Over Jordan ===
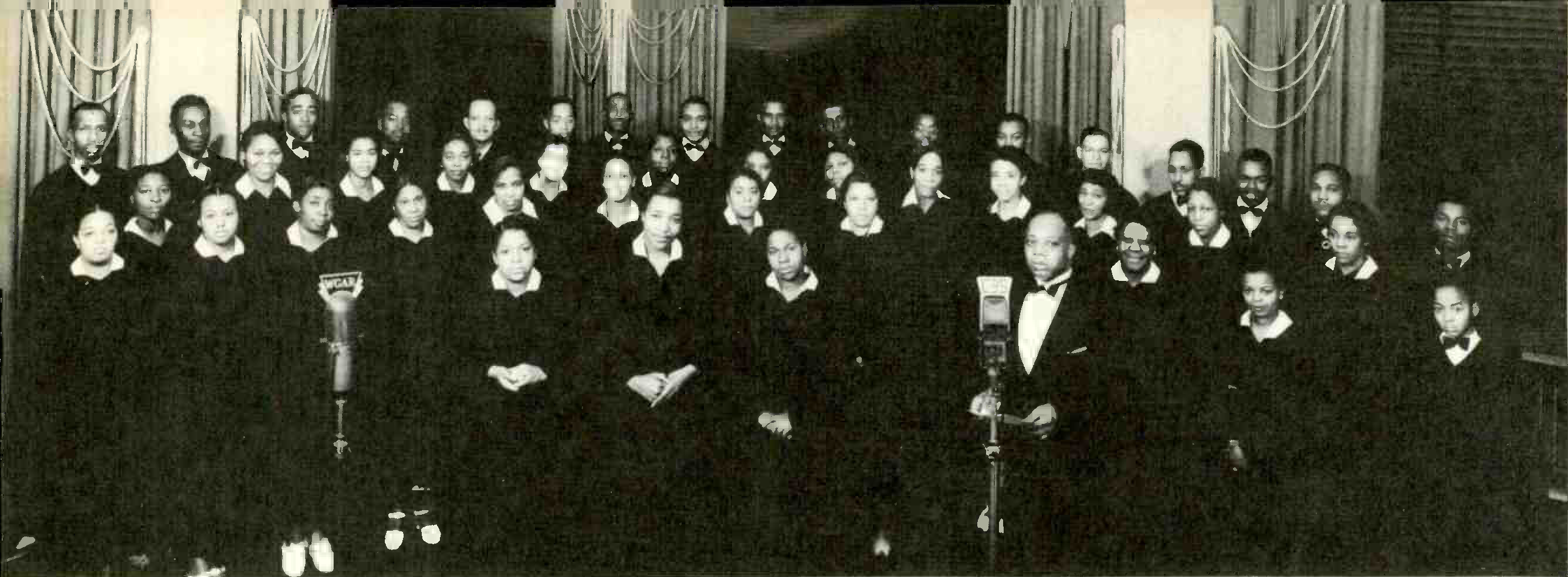
The Wings Over Jordan Choir, pictured in 1939.

From 1937 to 1947, WGAR originated Wings Over Jordan, a weekly religious radio program starring an a cappella spiritual choir of the same name based at Gethsemane Baptist Church in Cleveland's Central neighborhood, where the Rev. Glynn T. Settle served as pastor. After Settle approached WGAR program director Worth Kramer about adding a show aimed at Cleveland's black population to the station's existing Sunday lineup of ethnic fare, The Negro Hour was launched on July 11, 1937. Less than six months later, on January 9, 1938, CBS picked up the program nationally as Wings Over Jordan; the choir assumed its permanent name from the radio show title. Wings Over Jordan was the first radio show independently produced and hosted by African-Americans to be broadcast over a network. Kramer, who was white, served as the choir's director from 1938 to 1942 while maintaining his WGAR duties; his presence was initially controversial but has since been seen retrospectively as having helped the choir gain legitimacy among whites.

The show was CBS's highest-profile sustaining program and has been attributed to WGAR receiving the George Foster Peabody Medal for "distinguished service among medium-market stations" for 1940, the first such award bestowed in that category. CBS added a limited-run 15-minute weekday version of the program during the summer of 1941, broadcast out of WGAR. Wings Over Jordan was also placed on the 1941 Honor Roll of Race Relations by the New York Public Library's Schomburg Collection.

=== Frequency move to 1220 ===
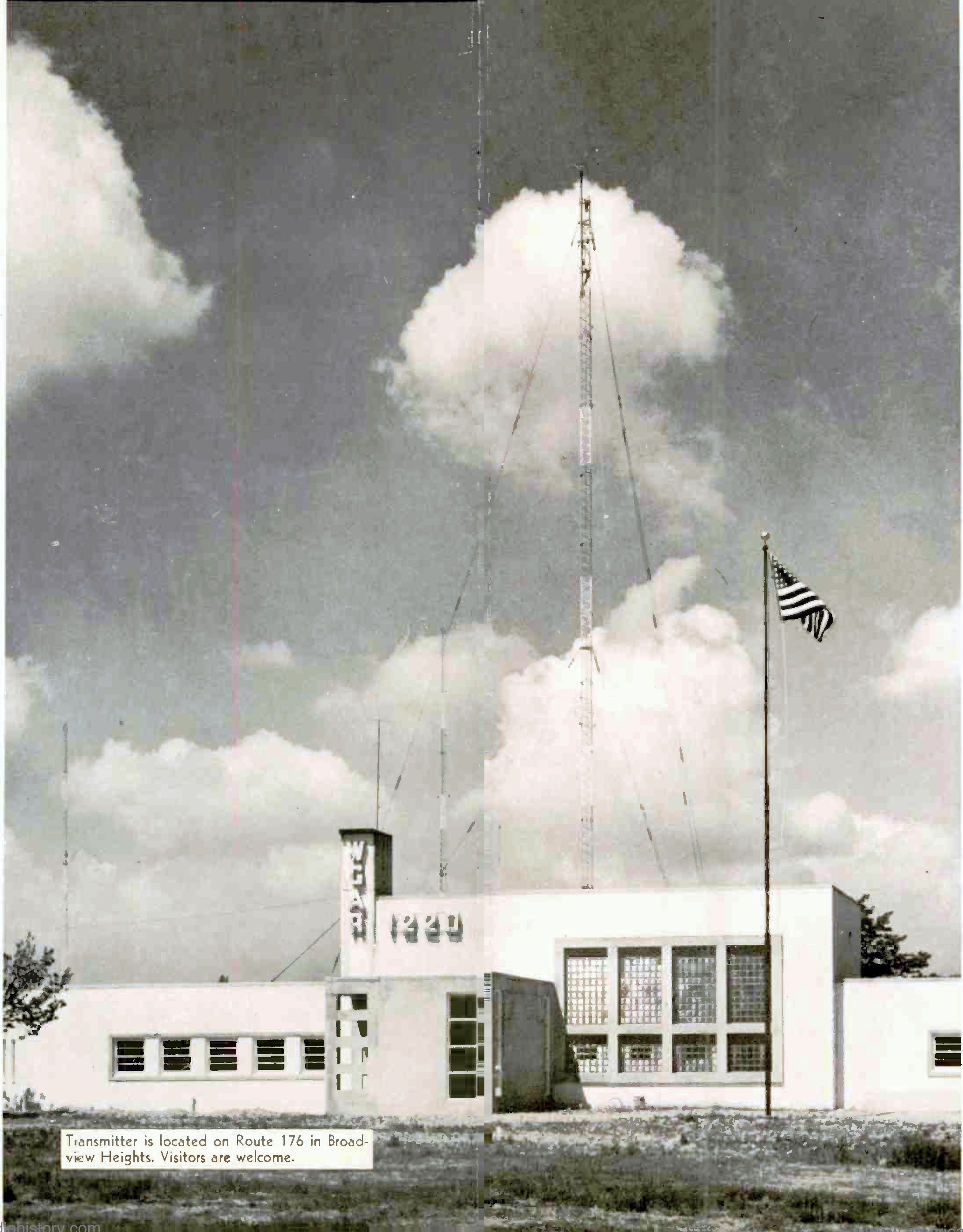
WGAR's transmitter in Broadview Heights, Ohio, c. 1947. This site is still in active use under the WHKW calls.

As part of the North American Regional Broadcasting Agreement (NARBA) frequency realignments, WGAR was moved from 1450 kHz to 1480 kHz on March 29, 1941, but engineering studies by the Federal Communications Commission (FCC) revealed WGAR's current facilities could only provide an interference-free signal to half of Cuyahoga County at night. Prior to the shift, on January 4, 1940, WGAR applied to move to 730 kHz with 10,000 watts from a Dover Township transmitter site, as Atlanta's WSB would vacate 730 kHz due to NARBA assigning it as a clear channel for Mexico. The NARBA accord also assigned 1220 kHz as a Mexican clear channel for use by Mexico City's XEB; initially no U.S. stations were authorized to use this frequency. As XEB's nighttime skywave did not extend the northeastern United States, the FCC opened up the channel for use in that region as a class II-B regional signal. While this assignment initially specified usage in Michigan, a planned move by Detroit's WXYZ failed to materialize, so it was modified to include use in Ohio. WGAR amended their application on March 10, 1941, to move to 1220 kHz with 50,000 watts and employing a directional antenna. Aiding in WGAR's favor was the commission's report on radio network monopolies previously noting Northern Ohio was underserved from a network standpoint.

The following January, WADC countered with an identical application for them to move to 1220 kHz with 50,000 watts along with an agreement that Canton's WHBC could move to WADC's current 1350 kHz frequency. Due to both stations being with CBS, it was surmised that the winner would emerge as the basic Columbia station for both markets. The FCC ordered a freeze on major facility changes after the U.S.'s entry into World War II, but with considerable leeway towards existing applications, thus WGAR amended the request again to 5,000 watts. Both WADC and WGAR's applications were designated for hearing by April 1942, with both stations reportedly having procured the resources and materials to make the upgrade. Following a series of hearings, the FCC both approved WGAR's application and a concurrent application by WHBC to move to the 1480 kHz frequency. (Note: Akron station WJW was set to move to Cleveland with a frequency change from 1240 kHz to 850 kHz and applied for a replacement station for Akron at 1240 kHz, this application was ultimately denied in part due to WGAR's facility change.) WGAR purchased 52 acres (21 ha) of land in Broadview Heights and refitted an existing farm house to become a transmitter building, owing to wartime restrictions. Copper wire from a prior transmitter site for WJR was reused for a ground system. The station heavily promoted the move to 1220 AM with a marketing campaign that included direct mail, billboards, cab signs and newspaper advertisements, all culminating with the switch at 12:20 p.m. on June 4, 1944, during CBS's Trans-Atlantic Call.

=== Power upgrade ===
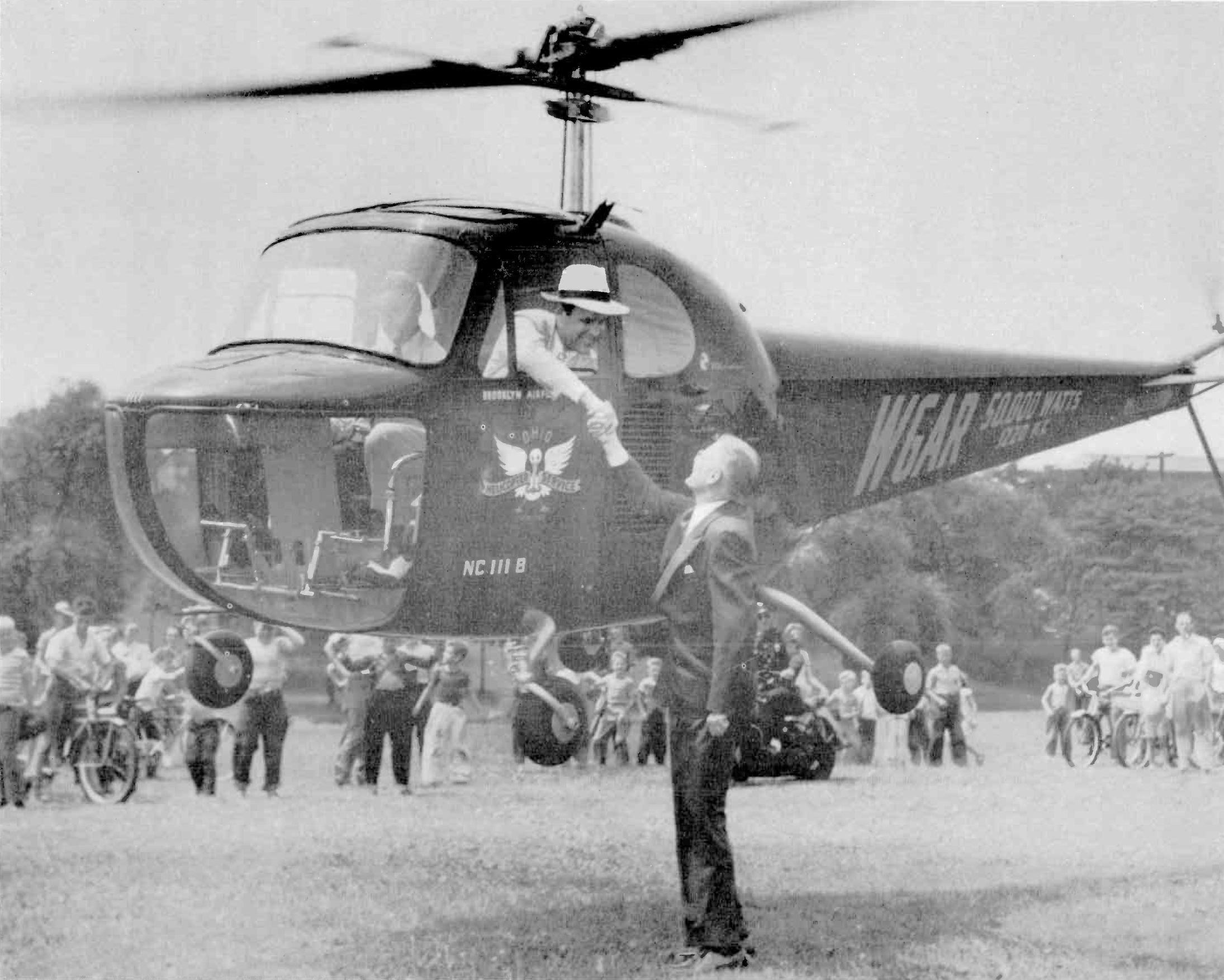
WGAR's Wayne Mack (in the helicopter) shaking the hand of a Canton, Ohio, dignitary as part of the station's 1947 Hometown Ohio series heralding their upgrade to 50,000 watts.

The frequency switch to 1220 AM was granted with the conditions that WGAR took "whatever steps are necessary to improve the signal" in Cleveland's business district, and that while technical parameters were met for 5,000 watt operation it could upgrade to 50,000 watts once materials were available. One week after V-J Day ended World War II, on August 21, 1945, the station filed for the 50,000 watt upgrade, with an RCA BTA-50F transmitter to be installed in a newly constructed building, replacing the farm house. That October 5, WADC again filed a competing application for 50,000 watts at 1220 kHz from a Granger Township site, effectively taking over WGAR's facilities; their application suggested WGAR would thus be moved to 1350 kHz. While a conditional grant was initially issued in WGAR's favor on February 7, 1946, the grant was rescinded three months later after WADC filed an objection claiming it violated a Supreme Court decision directing the FCC to hold competitive hearings in the event of mutually exclusive applications. Also at issue was WGAR's ownership being from out of town, (Note: Leo J. Fitzpatrick divested his stake in WGAR by 1946.) and that the proposed upgrade would result in significant signal overlap between WGAR and WJR, thus violating recent FCC precedent on duopoly restrictions.

The FCC granted WGAR the upgrade by October 6, 1946, determining that WADC provided insufficient evidence, and that WJR and WGAR's signal overlap would not be an issue as WJR—despite being a class I-A clear channel—had insignificant Cleveland listenership. WADC then challenged WGAR's 50 kW grant, protesting that WGAR's local programming was "tantamount to an abdication to the (CBS) network" and a potential court test of the FCC's Blue Book; WADC filed an additional petition for the FCC to no longer grant waivers to any facility changes. WGAR considered WADC's motions as estoppel, noting that programming was brought up in prior hearings and WADC did not object to anything then, and considered WADC's want to clear the CBS lineup outright "an ingenious interpretation" of the Blue Book overlooking the importance of local fare. WADC's petitions were denied by the FCC on May 23, 1947, dismissing charges of censorship, prompting WADC to appeal WGAR's 50 kW grant before the U. S. Courts of Appeals, which ruled in the FCC and WGAR's favor. WGAR's power increase to 50,000 watts took place with a dedication program on July 4, 1947, immediately followed by a Cleveland Indians-Detroit Tigers game announced by Van Patrick. The station then launched a limited series of remote broadcasts titled More Power To You showcasing cities such as Dover, Canton, Kent, Elyria and Painesville now serviced by the upgraded signal; in several instances, a WGAR staffer was flown in via helicopter.

=== License challenge ===
...beyond these unimportant immediate results lie some future possibilities that are more ominous. If a network or station were permitted to formulate an editorial policy for or against a major party or major issue, it's hard to see how sacred cows could fail to creep into the news rooms. An editor, or even a recognized news commentator whose job was at stake, would think twice before broadcasting a news item that ran counter to his network known editorial policy.

— John Crosby

WGAR, WJR and KMPC became central to a legal dispute surrounding internal policies enacted by George A. Richards that encouraged manipulation and bias. The March 6, 1948, issue of Billboard alleged that Richards had a history of interfering with KMPC's newscast content to reflect personal beliefs and prejudices. Two former KMPC staffers presented memos to Billboard attributed to Richards repeatedly insisting Jews were "all Communists" and that news personnel "keep hammering away at the Jews". Richards sought unflattering coverage on members of the Roosevelt family, Henry A. Wallace, the Truman administration and the New Deal, favorable reports on Gen. Douglas MacArthur and the spiking of any stories on Palestine so as not to "give aid and comfort to Jews and Communists". Clete Roberts, one of the two whistleblowers, claimed Richards fired him on grounds of insubordination after refusing to omit details on a profile of MacArthur, countering KMPC management's claim of his dismissal being economically related. Another former KMPC staffer further alleged Richards demanded significant emphasis of Jewish backgrounds for multiple news figures and ordered the fabrication of a story regarding Edwin W. Pauley pursuing a Truman cabinet post.

Multiple members of Congress, the American Jewish Congress (AJC), the Americans for Democratic Action (ADA) and the Radio News Club of Hollywood (RNC), along with James Roosevelt, all called for an FCC investigation. The AJC stated Richards "fomented hate among minorities" by blatantly flouting the Mayflower doctrine (which the FCC earlier considered a repeal of) and called for KMPC's license to be revoked. The FCC ordered an initial examination of all three stations on March 25, 1948, then for public investigatory proceedings after corroborating the Billboard evidence, which brought up "substantial questions" regarding Richards' qualifications as an owner. While the procedure would result in "a clean bill of health" for Richards if the charges were unfounded, his physical health soon overshadowed the process. In a filed affidavit, Richards admitted to portions of the charges and claimed his impulsive behavior was due to an 11-year bout with coronary thrombosis, while asserting other broadcast outlets and networks engaged in biased coverage to the commission's tacit approval. Initially slated for mid-February 1949, the hearings were delayed until March 16 and again postponed after Richards proposed to transfer all three stations to a trusteeship while his physicians insisted any hearing could potentially kill him. One of Richards' attorneys, former Sen. Burton K. Wheeler, argued the 60-year-old Richards had planned on retiring at said age. The National Community Relations Advisory Council (NCRAC) protested the trusteeship proposal, citing the FCC's general counsel Benedict P. Cottone's statements that neither of the three trustees were residents of Cleveland, Detroit or Los Angeles, while two of the trustees were known by one NCRAC member to have espoused deeply conservative viewpoints.

=== Hearings, Richards' death, and aftermath ===
Hearings finally commenced in Los Angeles on March 13, 1950, with FCC chief counsel Frederick W. Ford's opening statement accusing Richards of "slanting" and distorting news on his stations to "substantiate his personal dislikes". Clete Roberts testified Richards engaged in antisemitism and insisted of "a plot afoot, a Jewish plot" involving CBS's William S. Paley, NBC's David Sarnoff and ABC's Robert E. Kintner at a KMPC news staff meeting; Roberts also testified Richards fired him after his news story about Gen. MacArthur denoted graying hair and a quivering hand. Another announcer testified Richards ordered the removal of be-bop recordings because they had "communistic influence", but this was stricken from the record. (Note: Jack Paar later corroborated a ban on "swing music" by Richards existed in his memoir, detailing a directive for WGAR to temporarily drop out of CBS programming whenever they played any selections. Time magazine reported on the swing music ban for their May 21, 1938, issue, but attributed the ban to Goodwill executive Leo Fitzpatrick (who was also a close confidant and advisor to Fr. Coughlin) and not George A. Richards himself.) The hearings took political overtones: Sen. Styles Bridges demanded on the Senate floor for an investigation, claiming the FCC's investigation was punishment exerted against Richards for his political views. Representatives Anthony F. Tauriello and Harry J. Davenport denounced Roberts on the House floor based on prior comments he made about southern Italians, while Rep. Stephen M. Young considered the hearings an overreach of the FCC's authority "vested in it by Congress".

Presiding examiner J. Frederick Johnson Jr. died after the hearings were recessed, replacement James D. Cunningham restarted them on June 15 at the request of Richards's legal team. The FCC requested 7,000 news scripts from KMPC, and indicated the same request would be made for WJR and WGAR. Citing health reasons, Richards failed to obey a subpoena issued at the insistence of Benedict Cottone. KMPC manager Robert O. Reynolds—on the witness stand for over a month—stated Richards' prior thrombosis left him physically unable to walk or climb steps, an x-ray specialist countered by saying little evidence existed of an abnormal enlargement on his heart. When the FCC completed their prosecution at the end of August 1950, 34 witnesses gave 2,000,000 words on 8,000 pages of transcript over the course of 13 weeks; Cunningham ruled Richards did not need to testify. Richards' defense cited coverage in People's World and The Nation as evidence the hearings were inspired by the Communist Party. The NAB issued a resolution condemning the investigation as an invasion of Richards' free speech right and privacy, prompting NCRAC to criticize the NAB's "misunderstanding of the necessary and natural functions" of the FCC. The hearings ended in mid-December 1950 with Richards' legal team withdrawing the trusteeship proposal and propose advisory councils for all three stations; Examiner Cunningham deemed the hearings for WGAR as unnecessary.

In a 340-page finding submitted to the commission on May 15, 1951, Benedict Cottone recommended all three stations not have their licenses renewed as they did not serve the public interest, charged Richards with repeatedly violating FCC policy and the Communications Act of 1934 and assailed the "contempt" Richards held for the agency. Cottone also urged the FCC recognize that Richards used his stations to further his political interests and social prejudices. Examiner James D. Cunningham was to issue a subsequent proposal and en banc oral arguments were scheduled but Richards died 13 days later on May 28 from an abdominal aortic aneurysm at age 62. Fr. Coughlin was among the attendees at his funeral, while Rev. James W. Fifield Jr. claimed Richards was "murdered ... by those who sought to destroy freedom" in his eulogy. Examiner Cunningham motioned to dismiss all proceedings as moot on June 14, 1951, due to Richards' death. (Note: The trusteeship Richards proposed in 1949 was set up to be terminated upon his death.) Widow Frances S. Richards was bequeathed all three stations along with all other personal effects and made assurances the stations would adhere to a code eschewing bias in news reporting; the FCC renewed all three licenses and approved the ownership transfers to her name on November 28, 1951. All told, the legal fight ultimately cost Richards $2 million (equivalent to $24.8 million in 2025).

=== Peoples/Nationwide takeover ===
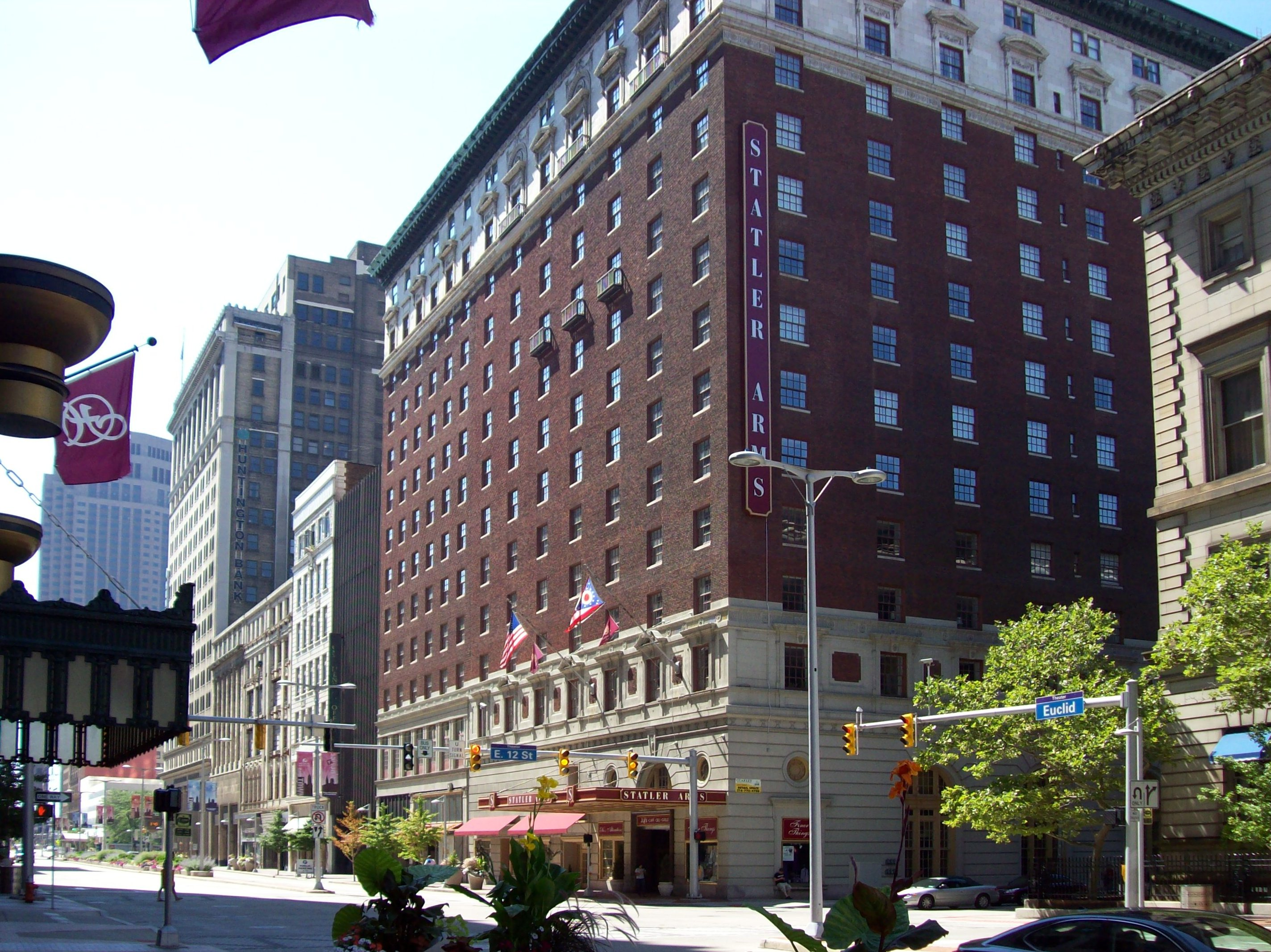
The Hotel Statler in downtown Cleveland was WGAR's first studio home from 1930 to 1971.

WGAR was purchased by Peoples Broadcasting Corp. on December 4, 1953, for $1.75 million (equivalent to $21.1 million in 2025), at that time the highest sale price for a radio station. Peoples was a subsidiary of Columbus-based Farm Bureau Mutual, a forerunner of Nationwide Insurance, and owned WRFD in Worthington; Peoples president Herbert E. Evans pledged to maintain WGAR's reputation of public service programming. (Note: This transaction followed Goodwill's prior $800,000 sale of KMPC to a group headed by Gene Autry earlier in the year. Goodwill retained WJR, which was sold off to Capital Cities Communications in 1964 as part of a $21 million group deal.) While John Patt stayed with Goodwill as WJR's president after the Peoples sale, WGAR's management team all stayed; Carl George continued as WGAR general manager until his 1971 retirement. The station's programming remained largely unchanged, continuing to carry a mixture of local news and music programming as supplementary to CBS Radio fare. WGAR was the flagship station for Cleveland Browns football broadcasts from 1946 to 1949 and from 1954 to 1961. The announcers for the Browns' 1946 inaugural season were Bob Neal and Stan Gee, (Note: Also an announcer at WGAR, Stan Gee was the father of area musician and long-tenured radio personality Michael Stanley.) while during much of the latter run on the station (as WGAR), Bill McColgan provided the play-by-play commentary, while Jim Graner served as color commentator; for the final season, Gib Shanley served as lead Browns announcer in addition to announcing Ohio State Buckeyes football games and hosting a nightly sports program. Cleveland Indians games also aired over WGAR starting in the middle of the 1946 season and through the 1947 season.

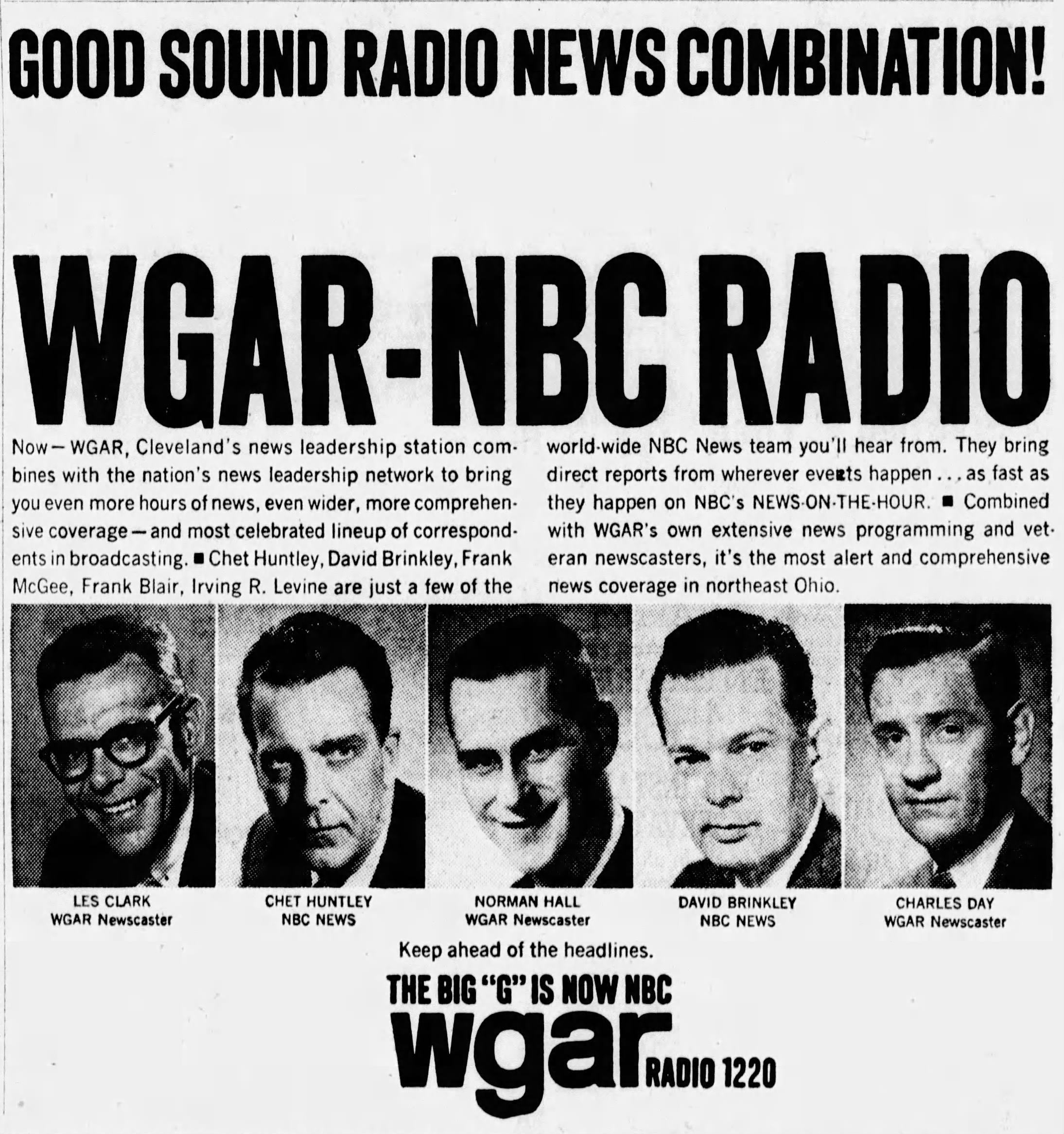
1962 WGAR ad promoting their NBC Radio affiliation with WGAR's Les Clark, Charles Day and Norman Hall alongside NBC's Chet Huntley and David Brinkley.

Tom Armstrong hosted the morning show at WGAR from 1954 to 1969, succeeding Bill Mayer, who hosted mornings from 1946 to 1954 and was remembered for having a jovial, light-hearted style. Armstrong's career at WGAR spanned much of the changes both in network radio and in local radio, joining in 1944 when the station employed two orchestras and 140 staffers; a generation later, a typical radio station would have 30 to 40 employees. The decline of network radio culminated with CBS Radio cancelling the majority of their entertainment programming in 1960 to focus on news and public affairs, but retained the WGAR-led Cleveland Orchestra broadcasts. Despite this, WGAR ended their CBS affiliation after 25 years at the end of 1961 to switch to NBC; Hubert E. Evans explained NBC "provides a service better geared to our concept of community service". WGAR switched again to ABC on December 11, 1965, after NBC's court-ordered repurchase of 1100 AM earlier in the year, but did not sign with either of ABC's newly launched networks at the start of 1968 and became an independent. The station was formally defined in 1966 as middle of the road (MOR) with assorted sports programming, a nightly call-in talk show and commentary segment both hosted by Sidney Andorn, a daily women's-oriented program and a news department led by news director Charles Day, in the position since 1946. Future New York City newscaster Bill Beutel was a staff announcer before joining WEWS-TV in 1959, his replacement at WGAR was future Chicago newscaster Joel Daly. Tom Armstrong left WGAR in April 1969 after he was moved to an early-afternoon slot, joining WDOK (102.1 FM) for their morning show, one of the first major-market AM radio personalities to move to the FM dial.

WGAR first filed paperwork on January 17, 1944, to establish an FM adjunct, but due to the number of applicants exceeding the number of available channels, WGAR's application was put through a competitive hearing in April 1946. The FCC decided in WGAR's favor that June, but the commission's proposed power output and height above average terrain (HAAT) was significantly less than what the station had requested, thus putting the application through another set of oral arguments. WGAR-FM launched on 99.5 MHz on December 15, 1952, but either simulcast the AM sister for the majority of the day (the FM carrying three hours of classical music in the evenings) or operated for only two hours a week to maintain their license. George Washington Campbell, who took over as head of Peoples Broadcasting in October 1966, (Note: Peoples was fully renamed to Nationwide Communications, Inc., in February 1967.) disclosed in Broadcasting magazine intentions to establish WGAR-FM as a separate entity from WGAR "as soon as major technical improvements are made". Upgrading to stereo in 1969, WGAR-FM was renamed WNCR, denoting "Nationwide Communications Radio", on May 4, 1970; two months later, a progressive rock format was instituted. The changes made at WNCR would soon parallel substantial changes at WGAR, which like the FM had become regarded as a "sleeping giant" in the market.

=== Adult contemporary relaunch ===
While other radio stations can operate from a calendar, we're going to operate from a stopwatch... we're going to move this station... we're going to make you believe in radio again.

— Jack G. Thayer

Jack G. Thayer was hired from Sacramento's KXOA as WGAR's general manager on August 10, 1970. It was also a return to Cleveland for Thayer, who had been in a similar capacity at WHK in the early 1960s. Nationwide was looking at ways to revamp WGAR's image since March, as the MOR format was targeting adults 50 and older. In short order, WGAR started running a series of diversionary promos that ranged from "all-talk" to "all-news", then carried rock music for one week, followed by an "all-request" format the following week. This campaign also included newspaper ads, one of which called out WIXY host Mike Reineri by name. These tactics quickly gave way to the new adult contemporary format on September 9, mixing in music from four distinct musical eras: 1955—1960, 1960—1965, 1965—1970, and softer-sounding current hits. In unveiling the format in advance to industry executives, Thayer boasted that WGAR would soon be breaking more new hit records than any other station in town. The oldies selections were themselves hit records, coupled with an on-air presentation that rivaled Top 40.

WGAR signed up with ABC's American Entertainment Network, added the weekly American Top 40 with Casey Kasem and expanded the news department. Newscasts and public affairs programming were retained but now presented at a faster pace multiple times throughout the day. Thayer brought along multiple staffers from KXOA to WGAR, including program director John Lund and morning host Don Imus. Thayer and Lund had first worked together at Los Angeles's KLAC prior to KXOA, and became interested in market-driven research assisted by the Western Behavioral Sciences Institute. Lund viewed their work at KXOA as a "fantastic test market" for WGAR, as KXOA was also programmed to reach a 18–34 demographic and enjoyed significant ratings increases. The "all-request music" stunt, along with extensive community surveys, proved useful as a way to gauge who listened to WGAR at different dayparts; Thayer and Lund found out in their research that WJW enjoyed an abnormal share of the 18–plus demo, and likewise for WIXY in the 35–plus demo, and viewed WGAR as a way to bridge a musical generation gap.

In addition to Imus, the new airstaff consisted of incumbent hosts "Emperor Joe" Mayer and Bob Vernon, along with music director Chuck Collier and Norm N. Nite. As part of their promotional campaign for Imus, WGAR purchased a series of billboards and a half-hour late-night television slot on WEWS-TV directed by Upbeat producer Herman Spero; Imus later referred Herman's son David Spero for a DJ position at WNCR-FM. Imus's tenure lasted for less than 15 months but immediately showed success; the October/November 1970 Arbitron ratings listed him at number one in the 18–49 demo, ahead of WKYC's Jim Runyon and WJW's Ed Fisher; WGAR as a whole topped both the 25–34 and 25–49 demos. Billboard awarded Imus as the number one radio personality for 1971, an honor shared with KMPC's Gary Owens.

=== John Lanigan era ===
WGAR was a 50,000-watt blowtorch. That's radio lingo for a station that didn't have other stations interfering, and "the friendly station" could be heard in 38 states and a big part of Canada during certain times of the day. We gave them plenty to listen to as well. Every day part had a jock who put on a show like morning drive. Lots of interviews, impressions, jingles and a staff who could pull it off.

— John Lanigan

Don Imus departed the Cleveland radio scene as quickly as he ascended, joining New York's WNBC as their morning host on December 2, 1971. Imus reportedly made $100,000 in his first year at WNBC, which was said to have been double his WGAR salary. (Note: It was later suggested that Imus heavily embellished his actual $19,000 salary to NBC execs.) After meeting him at a New Orleans industry convention, Thayer hired John Lanigan from Dallas's KRLD as Imus's replacement, bypassing 65 other applicants. Despite Lanigan's trepidation about taking over for Imus—and some newspaper critics who viewed him as "desperately trying to emulate" Imus—Lanigan in the Morning caught on in Cleveland almost immediately. By the end of 1972, Lanigan battled WIXY's Mike Reineri, WJW's Ed Fisher and WERE shock jock Gary Dee for the top-rated spot in morning drive. Lanigan's controversial persona centered around satire and ribaldry he dubbed "adult humor" and the station described as "radio for consenting adults". In addition to radio, Lanigan hosted WUAB's Prize Movie beginning in 1975, further adding to his exposure in the market and beyond, as WUAB was carried to other cable systems throughout the region. Lanigan's arrival also coincided with the station's studios moving from the Hotel Statler to the Broadview Heights transmitter site, renamed "WGAR Broadcast Park".

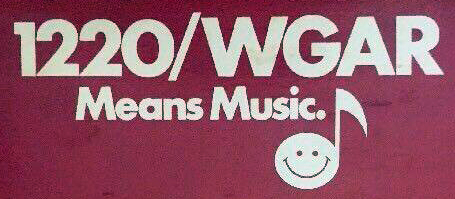
WGAR station logo, c. 1972.

John Lund soon followed Imus for New York City, leaving to become WNEW's program director in October 1973 and ultimately joined WNBC the following year. Loren Owens initially took over for Lund, and Chick Watkins—who joined WGAR in 1971 as creative services director—became assistant program director. Thayer was promoted to vice president of Nationwide Communications, then left to join NBC Radio by August 1974. Lund hired away Bob Vernon as WNBC's afternoon host in December 1974, completing what Newsday writer Tony Kornheiser called "that station's 'Cleveland connection.'" Norm N. Nite additionally left for New York City, but to WCBS-FM in 1973; Chuck Collier also went to WCBS-FM but returned to WGAR within two years. Watkins assumed the program director title outright by March 1975 and hired Bob James (Pondillo) for late evenings, giving him the air name "The Real" Bob James.

Even with the multiple staffing changes, WGAR maintained high ratings due to Lanigan's enduring popularity. WMMS program director John Gorman considered WGAR "an interesting battle" as he musically dayparted the album-oriented rock (AOR) station just like WGAR to take advantage of listener overlap. Gorman later stated that "the best decision by ... Nationwide Broadcasting, was not moving (WGAR's) format to FM", as Nationwide opted instead to convert WNCR from AOR to country on March 6, 1974. Other air personalities included Dave "Fig" Newton, Bruce Ryan and Kevin O'Neill.

The early 1980s brought additional changes. Chick Watkins left to join the upstart Transtar Radio Networks in January 1982; Mike Scott was his replacement. Former WHLO host Steve Cannon joined WGAR from Florida that March to host a talk-intensive evening show replacing RKO Radio Network's America Overnight. Scott's subsequent departure in 1983 resulted in multiple airshift realignments under acting program director Mike Metzger. In April, Chuck Collier was moved from early evenings to middays, with Metzger's late morning slot shortened to two hours. By September, Chuck segued over to WKSW-FM as music director and evening host, Steve Cannon replaced Chuck in middays and a jazz program hosted by Barb Richards took Cannon's place. At the same time, Lanigan was promoted to program director, succeeding Metzger; Lanigan jokingly told Radio & Records, "it's a feeling of panic!" WGAR additionally converted to AM stereo the previous December, but to minimal ratings impact.

John Lanigan left WGAR after a 12-year run in mornings on February 9, 1984, to join WMGG in Clearwater-Tampa. His replacement was incumbent afternoon host and impressionist Paul Tapie, with Lanigan and Tapie co-hosting in the days leading up to his departure. Some comedians who had already been composing material for Lanigan's WGAR show started doing so for both his new Tampa show and for Tapie's show. After Lanigan's departure, WMMS started getting requests for Top 40 songs usually heard on WGAR, and played them in hopes of attracting his former audience. WMMS's tactic worked as WGAR's ratings fell significantly when Tapie went solo.

=== Going country with the FM ===
Finally, on July 16, 1984, WGAR dropped adult contemporary for country music, with WKSW rebadged as WGAR-FM; management felt a format hole now existed for country after both WHK and WWWE dropped it. The new arrangement had Paul Tapie's morning show simulcast over both stations, with WGAR featuring holdover midday host Steve Cannon and Satellite Music Network-fed programming the rest of the day. Chuck Collier, however, would remain a fixture at WGAR-FM until his death on September 22, 2011. Collier was a 2009 inductee into the Country Music Radio Hall of Fame and became synonymous with WGAR itself through his lengthy tenure. The station donated its entire collection of jazz recordings to WCPN in preparation for their September 1984 sign-on, and donated both their glass disc recordings and news tape archives to John Carroll University.

Following the FCC's repeal of the FM Non-Duplication Rule in March 1986, rumors of WGAR simulcasting WGAR-FM emerged but were downplayed by management. However, Paul Tapie's departure for WNCX that October led to the AM station relaying the FM outright. Cleveland Force broadcasts over WGAR became the lone schedule deviation, WGAR headed up a three-station network for the Major Indoor Soccer League club. WGAR-FM was becoming one of the top-rated stations in the Cleveland market, while WGAR was among the lowest-rated with a core audience of people 55 and older; the simulcast allowed for both to be rated together. The news department was also downscaled, with newscasts limited to both drive times, noon and Saturday mornings, and staffing reduced from seven to three in the span of seven years. The former air studios were rendered as auxiliaries after the format combination and proved useful when an electrical fire struck the Keith Building on July 30, 1987, which housed the studios for WQAL; WGAR engineers arranged in the span of an hour to have the beautiful music FM station operate from their facilities for several days.

== WKNR (1990–2001) ==
=== Gradual sports format launch ===
A few minutes before midnight, the AM/FM simulcast broke away and the voice of (chief engineer) Mark Krieger came on and narrated the presentation. An extremely well put-together piece, with moments from the likes of alumni Don Imus and Jack Paar. It wound down as the clock edged toward midnight. Krieger came back on with a reminder that Cleveland's Country continued on 99.5 FM:

"Won't you join us? ... This is W-G-A-R A-M Cleveland, Signing off."

Silence. About five seconds' worth. The carrier dropped. About ten seconds of random junk. The carrier popped back on with a carted legal ID identifying the new station, walking all over Ronnie Milsap's "Smoky Mountain Rain".

— Paul Phillips, WGAR-FM engineer

Nationwide Communications sold off WGAR to Douglas Broadcasting, a Black-owned company headed by N. John Douglas, in August 1989 for $2 million (equivalent to $5.19 million in 2025). Douglas also owned three stations in California that specialized in ethnic and religious fare. While the purchase was nearing completion in March 1990, Douglas amended the deal with Cablevision Systems making a $500,000 investment as a limited partner. The station barely registered in the Arbitron ratings when the purchase was made, with CKLW in Windsor, Ontario, reportedly drawing higher numbers than 1220 AM in the Cleveland ratings book. In advance of the switch, WGAR-FM gave away FM converters to any remaining WGAR listeners. Cablevision executive and former WGAR general manager Art Caruso was retained as a consultant, and onetime WWWE programmer Jim Glass was hired as the new station's operation's manager.

The simulcast ended shortly before midnight on June 29, 1990, with a ten-minute sendoff including audio from Don Imus and Jack Paar. After the sendoff ended, WGAR changed callsigns to WKNR and picked up Unistar's satellite-based country format using the same automation system WGAR used prior to the simulcast. Speculation about the forthcoming format included potential bidding for the broadcast rights to the Cavaliers, Indians and Browns, all of which were held by WWWE. The format again switched to oldies—also via Unistar—on October 1, with Jim Glass indicating the station could head in a full-service direction similar to Cincinnati's WLW and Indianapolis's WIBC. WKNR general manager Robert Barnes also hinted about wanting to create "a strong news and sports presence" for the station. WGAR-FM remained in the Broadview Heights facility alongside WKNR until moving to the Crown Centre in Independence by mid-March 1991, combining it with an existing sales office that had been in downtown Cleveland. Because of the prolonged simulcast and personnel that had already carried over, WGAR-FM claimed WGAR's history as its own. (Note: When WGAR-FM won the 1995 CMA Award for "Station of the Year", one newspaper report noted the call letters were "perhaps already associated with greatness.")

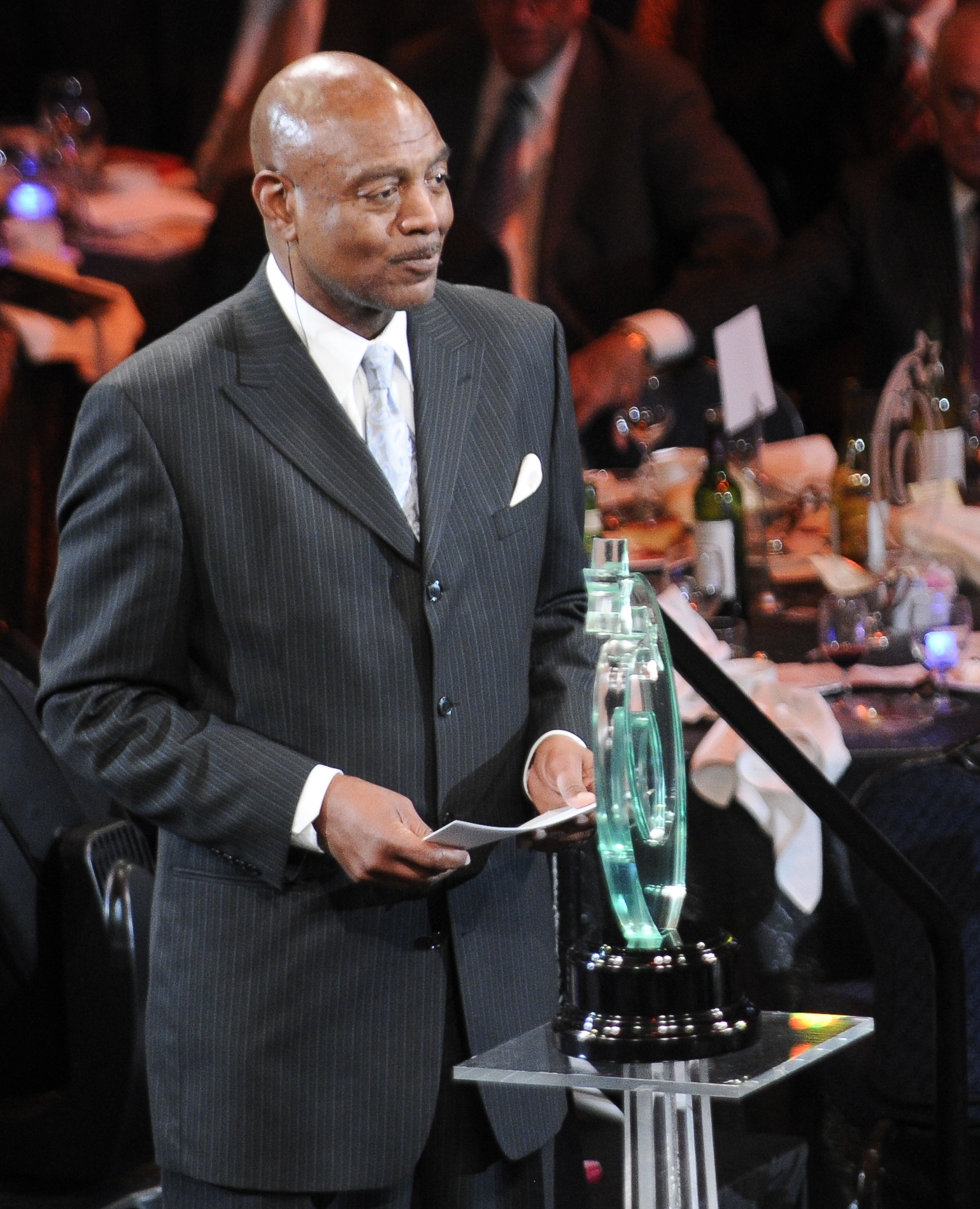
Reggie Rucker

WKNR's satellite-fed music was ultimately a format placeholder until WGAR-FM could depart and end what Robert Barnes called a claustrophobic "mom-and-pop setup." At the end of 1990, WKNR added local newscasts, then recruited Larry Calton and former WWWE host Geoff Sindelar to host sports talk shows in afternoon drive. By January 7, 1991, Reggie Rucker was added for evenings and the overnight hours taken up by the syndicated Sports Byline USA, with locally based weekend sports shows added a few months later. Reaction to the sports-talk block for its debut week, dubbed "Cleveland's SuperFan", was positive enough for management to consider the sustainability of a 24-hour sports format. Barnes boasted to the Akron Beacon Journal that Cablevision's ownership interests allowed him to have "full authority and an unlimited budget", but was fired on July 22; Calton was also dismissed in June after making an anti-Semitic slur on-air. Former WERE host Greg Brinda was then hired for middays, Philadelphia-based Peter Brown replaced Calton in the lineup, and a morning show with onetime WGCL personality Robert J. Wright debuted on September 9, 1991, finally making WKNR a fulltime sports radio station. WEWS-TV meteorologist Don Webster also started providing weather forecasts for the station.

=== Adding the Indians ===
There's nothing worse than five calls in a row about the same thing. We're in the entertainment business. There's a misconception that talk shows are part of people's First Amendment rights.

— Jim Glass, WKNR general manager

The format's soft launch resulted in WKNR drawing low ratings, with spring 1991 Arbitron surveys ranking the station at 22nd place for the Cleveland market and not placing at all in the Akron book. Reports of the station continuing to pursue the market's professional sports play-by-play rights continued; WKNR initially bid for rights to the Cleveland Browns Radio Network, but lost to WHK. WWWE owner Booth Broadcasting declined to renew their contract for the Cleveland Indians Radio Network at the conclusion of the 1991 season, citing declining ratings, a high compensation demanded by the team and an overabundance of games broadcast on television. Consequently, WKNR reportedly offered "whatever it takes" to get the Indians contract. WKNR paid the Indians $5 million (equivalent to $11.5 million in 2025) in the initial two-year contract with a potentially annual loss of $3 million for the station, but the deal was still made with hopes of boosting the sports format's profile. (Note: The Indians assume responsibilities for production and distribution of game broadcasts, then purchased the air time on WKNR for broadcast. Despite reports that announcers Herb Score and Tom Hamilton's jobs were potentially at risk with the flagship switch, both went to WKNR as de facto employees of the team.) To celebrate the Indians addition, WKNR rebroadcast recordings of the 1948 World Series play-by-play from Mutual Radio over a six-day span starting on Christmas Day 1991.

Billed as "Mr. Objectivity," Peter Brown's combative afternoon show and very transparent "me-against-the-world" on-air persona attracted controversy. Brown frequently lashed out at athletes and coaches solely to elicit listener reaction, with Cavaliers players and Browns head coach Bill Belichick among his targets. Cavs broadcaster Joe Tait, who viewed Brown as a cheap Pete Franklin imitation, posited that his shock jock approach revolved around carefully picking people "who wouldn't meet him in the parking lot and punch his lights out". Despite the attention, Brown left the station in early September 1993 after two years, the result of a contract impasse. Bill Needle, a former public relations director for the Cavaliers, initially took over Robert J. Wright's morning slot in August 1992, then replaced Reggie Rucker in evenings with Paul Tapie's return to 1220 AM as morning host. Tapie was paired with former WKYC sportscaster Thor Tolo for a year, then hosted mornings solo until Mike Wolfe replaced him on May 9, 1994.

WKNR's on-air presentation was regarded as rigid and sober, with show topics scheduled in advance and limited solely to sports, producers screened callers prior to going on-air, and phone calls limited to a maximum of two minutes. The Plain Dealer's Roger Brown repeatedly criticized the station as "a bloodless, antiseptic, bean-counter feel" and "on the whole is so bland as to make oatmeal seem like spicy jambalaya". Hosts were marketed according to their levels of expertise: Geoff Sindelar, who gained notoriety as a regular caller to Pete Franklin's Sportsline on WWWE, was billed as "The Professor" playing off his knowledge of statistics and collectables. Sindelar also hosted the weekly collectables-oriented Sports 101 television program, produced by Dennis Goulden and syndicated nationally. Likewise, Greg Brinda was promoted as "The Dean". WHK's conversion to all-sports on May 16, 1994, took a loose, "fan-friendly" form and were themselves openly critical of WKNR's formantics; WKNR management defended their methodical approach as key to appealing towards a larger audience.

=== Carrying the Browns ===
WKNR and WDOK signed a two-year contract on March 23, 1994, to be Browns Radio Network co-flagships with broadcasts produced by Sportsmarketing, headed by WDOK co-owner Tom Wilson. The six-figure deal between both stations had the team retaining all ad revenue during games, with the stations getting all pre- and post-game ad revenue. Nev Chandler was to have returned as lead play-by-play voice alongside color commentator Doug Dieken, but his death from colon cancer that August 7 necessitated Casey Coleman to be his replacement. The statewide radio network grew from 40 affiliates in 1994 to 49 affiliates in 1995. The 1995 season, however, became entirely overshadowed when news of the team's relocation to Baltimore broke on November 4, 1995. Greg Brinda recounted the station's fax machine ran non-stop for 24-hours and compared it to "somebody dropping an atom bomb on Cleveland". Mike Wolfe did his morning show live from Baltimore the day the move was formally announced while WKNR, in coordination with The Plain Dealer, gave out fax numbers for all other NFL teams for fans to submit direct letters of protests.

The Browns Radio Network continued to carry the games despite the loss of commercial advertising, Sportsmarketing estimated the lost ad revenue totaled tens of thousands of dollars. WKNR filled all vacated commercial breaks during the games with public service announcements. Ancillary Browns-related programming on WKNR and other broadcast outlets were cancelled in protest. While Greg Brinda remarked prior to the Browns–Steelers rivalry game that callers to his show hoped the team would lose all remaining games, including the Steelers game, he retrospectively felt the raw emotion paled in comparison to fan reaction over the team's abrupt release of quarterback Bernie Kosar in 1993. As the 1995 season began, Brinda saw the relationship between fans and head coach Bill Belichick—who was largely blamed for Kosar's release—as fractured and irreparable. The relocation to Baltimore as the Ravens was finalized and approved on February 10, 1996, with WKNR signing up as a Cincinnati Bengals Radio Network affiliate for the 1996 season. The station saw the Bengals games as a way to gauge interest in possible secondary fanbases.

=== Reaching the World Series ===
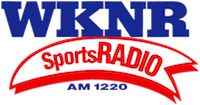
Logo as WKNR, 1991–2001.

WKNR's ratings and reputation continued their rise largely due to the Browns relocation fallout and Indians renaissance. The station was ranked as the second-best sports station in the country in 1995 by an independent survey of males 17 and older, and subsequently billed as the highest-rated all-sports station by Arbitron in early 1996. The Indians contract was extended in mid-1996 through the 1999 season after WKNR made multiple financial concessions. Morning host Mike Wolfe, however, was indicted in early February 1997 on charges of stealing $300 raised for a Lions Club charity; Wolfe later pled guilty to misdemeanor charges. The station replaced Wolfe with the syndicated Imus in the Morning by mid-May, marking a return of sorts for Don Imus to the station, midday host Bill Needle was concurrently replaced with WOIO sports anchor Ronnie Duncan. Future ESPN broadcaster Marc Kestecher also was a talk show host on WKNR during this period. Imus in the Morning was ultimately a ratings failure for WKNR as the station lost considerable listenership during morning drive.

Herb Score announced his retirement as Indians broadcaster on August 8, 1997, effective at the end of the 1997 season. It was argued that Score likely witnessed more bad baseball than any other broadcaster as his 34-year tenure spanned much of the team's 33-year-long stretch of futility, and was beloved by fans even with a tendency to confuse player names and misidentify plays on-field. As the team reached the 1997 World Series, the last games Score ever called aired exclusively on WKNR due to MLB rules, the rest of the Indians Radio Network carried Vin Scully's play-by-play over CBS Radio. Strong sentiment existed among the team's fanbase and some of the players to win the World Series for Herb, but the Florida Marlins won the series in seven games; Score was behind the mic for the final play. Tom Hamilton succeeded Score as lead team broadcaster entering the 1998 season.

Despite the Indians' success on-field, their contract with WKNR was a loss leader as the station ran an annual $1 million deficit. Jacor, which purchased WLTF and WTAM (Note: Renamed from WWWE on July 29, 1996.) earlier in 1997, entered into talks with Cablevision to purchase WKNR. Published reports suggested Jacor's main objective was to move the Indians rights to WTAM and run WKNR as a heavily downscaled sports talker or drop the format altogether. As early as 1994, the station was subject to rumors of possible sales, with one executive lamenting the difficulty in killing the rumor while at the same time desiring an FM signal. Jacor was also interested in the land WKNR's Broadview Heights studios/transmitter site sat on that could be resold to real estate developers, Cablevision likewise held off on a deal for several weeks in hopes of recouping some of the land value. The $8.7 million purchase (equivalent to $17.4 million in 2025) was announced on August 19, 1997, but Cablevision faced allegations from the Rainbow/PUSH Coalition over discriminatory hiring practices; WKNR was fined $14,000 by the FCC and saw their license renewal delayed until a review of Jacor's hiring records could take place.

=== Multiple ownership changes ===
We have moved into a different era of broadcasting. These days of 12 different stations in a market with 12 different owners are over. Now, it's my mega-corporation against your mega-corporation. It's the same thing we're seeing in other businesses... the battles are between one company that owns six stations, and another company that owns six stations.

— Greg Brinda

When Jacor took over operations on January 1, 1998, Imus in the Morning was dropped, Ronnie Duncan and Geoff Sindelar left by their own volition, Greg Brinda was moved to morning drive and WTAM host Kendall Lewis was added for late mornings. The remainder of the schedule took a heavily syndicated approach with The Jim Rome Show and ESPN Radio's The Fabulous Sports Babe and GameNight in middays, afternoons and evenings, partly to counterprogram WTAM afternoon host Mike Trivisonno. The biggest change came when Jacor fulfilled the initial rumors and moved the Indians broadcasts back to WTAM with the 1998 home opener on April 10, 1998. As part of the rearrangement, WKNR became a backup station for Cleveland Cavaliers games in the event of any overlap during both teams' regular seasons and for Indians games during any Cavaliers playoff games. WKNR filled the void created by this move with ESPN Radio programming and MLB and NBA play-by-play, along with Cleveland Lumberjacks games.

The station would be repeatedly sold, merged into, and divested in the span of two years, brought on by deregulation in the wake of the Telecommunications Act of 1996. (Note: A 2002 Cleveland Scene piece on WKNR's successor station at 850 AM compared the station to having been "passed around like a bad case of mono" during this time.) To complete their $620 million purchase of Nationwide Communications, WKNR was traded by Jacor to Capstar Broadcasting on August 10, 1998, in exchange for WTAE in Pittsburgh. (Note: This divestiture was one of several induced by the U.S. Justice Department to clear the merger and specifically intended to limit Jacor's revenue share of the Cleveland market to 39 percent.) WKNR program director Marvin Durant expressed uncertainty over the station's future, but cited the local shows and Rome's show as "doing well"; following the ownership trade, The Fabulous Sports Babe was replaced with a local afternoon show hosted by Kenny Roda. Jim Rome's show in particular experienced unlikely success on WKNR given his unconventional on-air presentation that appealed to a younger audience. The station first hosted a "tour stop" for Rome at the Cleveland State Convocation Center on January 23, 1999, with over 13,000 in attendance and multiple Cleveland professional athletes and coaches as guests. A second live event for Rome took place on June 10, 1999, at the Blossom Music Center in Cuyahoga Falls, with a similarly large audience. Under Capstar, WKNR attempted a bid for broadcast rights to the expansion Cleveland Browns franchise, but lost out to Jacor and WMJI.

Capstar merged with Chancellor Media on July 13, 1999, to form AMFM Inc., putting WKNR into common ownership with WDOK, WRMR (850 AM), WQAL, WZJM, WZAK and WJMO (1490 AM), which Chancellor had acquired for a combined $275 million through three simultaneous buyouts. Clear Channel Communications (which itself had merged into Jacor earlier in the year) then purchased AMFM, Inc. on October 3, 1999—only 82 days after AMFM's creation—for $17.4 billion. Clear Channel elected to divest the entire seven-station AMFM cluster, selling WRMR and WKNR to Salem Communications on May 6, 2000, closing that July 20. The deal immediately raised speculation as to the future of WKNR's sports format given Salem's reputation as a Christian-oriented broadcaster. Salem previously purchased WHK in April 1996 and switched their format from sports to Christian talk shortly thereafter. Following his purchase of the Cleveland Indians, Larry Dolan made inquiries to Salem early in 2001 about purchasing WKNR as a possible replacement flagship; Larry's son Paul confirmed talks had taken place, but it was a "nonissue." At the start of the 2001 Indians season, WKNR hired Bruce Drennan to host The 10th Inning postgame call-in show.

== WHK/WHKW (2001–present) ==
=== 2001 "frequency swap" ===
Logo as WHK, 2001–2004.

Reports of Larry Dolan negotiating to buy WKNR and WRMR continued into early June 2001, and even included a possible purchase of WUAB as a bidding war for Indians television broadcast rights was taking place. Said rumors became moot as both WKNR and WRMR—along with five other stations—became intertwined with a series of intellectual property and assets swaps between Salem, Clear Channel, and WCLV owner Radio Seaway. (Note: Although generally reported as a "frequency swap", these stations mostly traded call signs, formats and staffers to facilitate ownership transfers for four of the seven stations. See WCPN § 2001 "frequency swap".) When the exchange was finalized on July 3, 2001, Salem divested both WHK and Canton simulcast WHK-FM, but retained WHK's Christian format and call sign, transferring both to WKNR as a format change. (Note: The WHK calls were temporarily "parked" on then-co-owned WCCD in Parma and on 95.5 FM after the asset swap took place. As a result, WKNR changed calls to WHKC on July 3, 2001, and then to WHK on August 3, 2001, when the WCCD calls were restored on the Parma station.) Concurrently, WRMR changed format to the sports programming previously heard on WKNR and assumed the WKNR calls, inheriting all off- and on-air personnel. The "new" WKNR at 850 AM continued to use studios at the 1220 AM facilities until 2007, when Salem divested WKNR to Good Karma Broadcasting; since then, the transmitter building has been used for storage and engineering space.

=== AM 1220 The Word ===
Salem repurchased the 1420 AM facility, by then using the WRMR calls, on July 6, 2004, and switched that station's format six days later to conservative talk branded as "WHK". WHK retained the existing "The Word" branding and Christian format but began to formally promote itself as "WHKW", using the call letters of co-owned WHKW, a simulcast of WHK licensed to Warren and serving the Youngstown market. On April 5, 2005, Salem changed WHK's call letters to WHKZ, freeing up the WHK calls for WRMR; eight days later, WHKZ and WHKW exchanged call signs. Salem sold off WHKZ to Immaculate Heart Media, Inc. on August 15, 2019, as part of a multi-station purchase. When the deal closed that November 14, WHKZ ended its simulcast of WHKW to become a Relevant Radio station.

WHKW's Christian radio programming is largely supplied by the co-owned Salem Radio Network. One featured program, Truth for Life, is of local origin as host Rev. Alistair Begg is the lead pastor for Parkside Church in Bainbridge Township. What's Right, What's Left, a talk show hosted by Ernie Sanders, airs in late mornings and late evenings. Some non-religious programs air on the weekends, including Turning You Onto Classical Music, hosted by Beau Coup keyboardist Dennis Lewin and The New Czech Voice of Cleveland, hosted by John Sabol. WHKW has also carried Warren G. Harding High School Raiders football broadcasts since 2020.

== FM translator ==
WHKW is additionally relayed over the following low-power FM translator:

Broadcast translator for WHKW
Call sign	Frequency	City of license	FID	ERP (W)	HAAT	Class	Transmitter coordinates	FCC info
W245CY	96.9 FM	Cleveland, Ohio	145205	40	160.33 m (526 ft)	D	41°26′32.2″N 81°29′28.4″W	LMS

Signal contours for WHKW and associated translator.; Daytime groundwave 2 mV/m signal for WHKW; Grade A 60 dBu signal for W245CY

== Bibliography ==
- Tull, Thomas B., ed. (1947). This is WGAR: Going forward with Radio (PDF). Peoria, Illinois: National Radio Personalities, Inc. Archived (PDF) from the original on October 2, 2021 – via World Radio History.
- WGAR, Cleveland's Friendly Station: Personalities (PDF). Peoria, Illinois: National Radio Personalities, Inc. 1939. Archived (PDF) from the original on August 24, 2021 – via World Radio History.
