= WCSO (AM) =

Radio station in Springfield, Ohio (1922–1930)

WCSO was a radio station that was licensed to Springfield, Ohio, United States, and owned by Wittenberg College. First licensed in 1922, it was deleted in 1930 as part of a consolidation with WFJC in Akron, Ohio, which WCSO operated on a timeshare basis with, that created WGAR.

== History ==
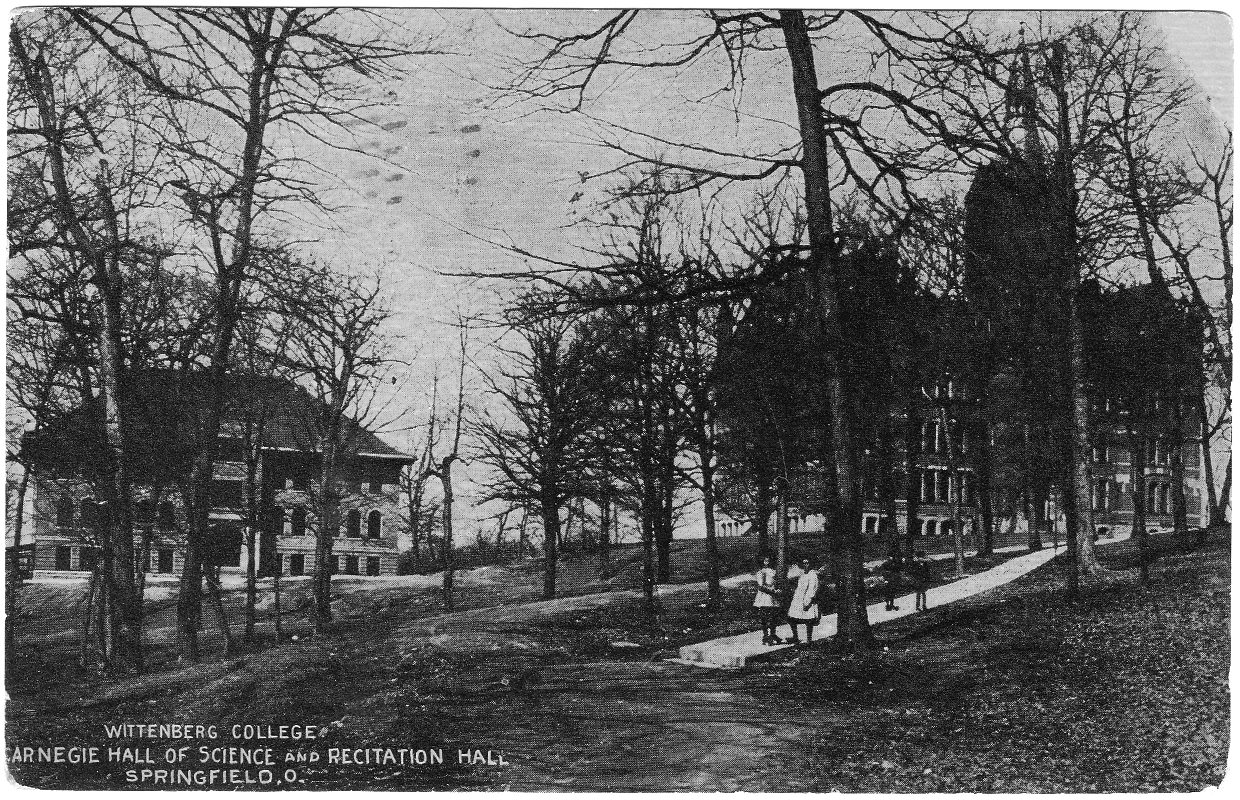
Wittenberg College's Carnegie Science Hall in Springfield (pictured here in 1911) was the first home to WNAP/WCSO, one of two forerunners to today's WHKW. The station's towers were located in front of the hall.

WCSO was first licensed as WNAP on October 13, 1922, to Wittenberg College in Springfield, operating on the standard "entertainment" wavelength of 360 meters (833 kHz). As early as 1896, the college's physics department had experimented with radio transmissions, and a radio club composed of students was established in 1906. First receiving experimental license 8XAK earlier in 1922, Wittenberg professor E. O. Weaver and several of his students constructed the 1,000 watt transmitter in advance of signing on, and programming was presented by the college's Speech and Drama Department.

The station's frequency was reassigned in the fall of 1923 to 1300 kHz, to 1090 kHz in early 1924, and to 1210 kHz at the end of the year. The station's call letters were changed to WCSO—for Wittenberg College, Springfield, Ohio—on March 6, 1925, and the station was reassigned to 1170 kHz on June 15, 1927. Originally located at Wittenberg's Carnegie Science Hall, the studios were eventually moved to Blair Hall, with the radio towers erected in front of the science building.

As part of a major reallocation under the provisions of the FRC's General Order 40, on November 11, 1928, WCSO was assigned to 1380 kHz on a timesharing basis with KQV in Pittsburgh. WCSO was reassigned to 1450 kHz a few months later as WFJC's new timesharing partner.

George A. Richards, Leo J. Fitzpatrick and P. M. Thomas—owners of WJR in Detroit—incorporated the WGAR Broadcasting Company in order to establish "Cleveland's fourth radio station". On September 6, the company filed an application with the Federal Radio Commission (FRC) for authorization to "consolidate stations WFJC and WCSO into a new station with new equipment at Cleveland Ohio", which was approved that same month. The WGAR Broadcasting Company took over ownership of WCSO on September 26, 1930, later recognized as a casualty of the Great Depression; WFJC was acquired seven days earlier. WCSO made its final broadcast on October 11, 1930, after coverage of the Wittenberg Tigers-Washington & Jefferson Presidents football game and its license was formally deleted at the end of the month.

Later renamed Wittenberg University, the institution re-entered radio broadcasting in 1966 with the sign-on of WUSO, regarded as "a descendant" of WCSO.
