= WFJC =

Radio station in Akron, Ohio (1924–1930)

WFJC was a radio station in Akron, Ohio. First licensed in 1924 in Cleveland as WDBK, it was moved to Akron in 1927 and deleted in 1930 as part of a consolidation with a Springfield, Ohio, radio station that created WGAR.

== History ==
WFJC's first license, for 100 watts on 1210 kHz, was issued in May 1924 under the station's original call sign, WDBK, to the M. F. Broz Furniture, Hardware & Radio Company at 13918 Union Avenue in Cleveland's Mount Pleasant neighborhood. It began broadcasting on May 15, 1924. WDBK was deleted in the fall of 1924, then relicensed the following spring, again with 100 watts, but now on 1320 kHz. Programming included jazz selections interspersed with an imitation steamboat whistle as a station identification, along with live musical performances; reception for WDBK was limited outside of Cleveland and was barely audible in Akron. In early 1927 the owner was changed to WDBK Broadcasting (Inc.) (Stanley J. Broz) at the Bolton Square Hotel on Carnegie Avenue, using the slogan "Broadcasting from Cleveland".

Automobile dealer W. F. Jones purchased WDBK on July 15, 1927, with the intent of moving the station to Akron. Jones's involvement in the medium began when—at his insistence—a February 1925 auto show used a temporary station named WADC to broadcast the show's events, with a transmitter built by the Willard Storage Battery Co. After the show ended, Jones tried to sign on the station permanently, but theatre owner Allen T. Simmons launched WADC from the Portage Hotel on April 8, 1925. Jones was granted a permit to move WDBK to Akron but would remain on 1320 kHz and sharing time with Cleveland station WJAY. Renamed WFJC, the station made its debut broadcast from the Akron Beacon Journal building on October 22, 1927, but merely as a tenant, the Beacon Journal did not have any ownership stake. Sam Townshend was listed as station manager, secretary and lead engineer.

Following the establishment of the Federal Radio Commission (FRC), stations were initially issued a series of temporary authorizations starting on May 3, 1927. In addition, they were informed that if they wanted to continue operating, they needed to file a formal license application by January 15, 1928, as the first step in determining whether they met the new "public interest, convenience, or necessity" standard. On May 25, 1928, the FRC issued General Order 32, which notified 164 stations, including WFJC, that "From an examination of your application for future license it does not find that public interest, convenience, or necessity would be served by granting it." However, the station successfully convinced the commission that it should remain licensed.

As part of a major reallocation under the provisions of the FRC's General Order 40, on November 11, 1928, WFJC was assigned to 1450 kHz, again in a time share with WJAY. WJAY moved to a different frequency allowing WFJC to operate full-time, but this was temporary as WCSO—the radio station of Wittenberg College in Springfield, Ohio—was reassigned to 1450 kHz a few months later as WFJC's new timesharing partner. WFJC filed paperwork with the FRC on March 30, 1930, to move to 900 kHz, operate full-time and increase power to 1,000 watts; station management cited what had become a competitive disadvantage against WADC and Cleveland's WHK and WTAM.

An air of sadness prevailed, this being the last day on the air for WFJC... The radio commission has taken away the right to broadcast from this station, but there is one thing that never can be taken away from us—memories and fond recollections of the many pleasant hours spent in the studio at WFJC. We hold hopes that perhaps in the near future, Akron will be able to have and hold a downtown radio station.

— Louella Houser Yackle, host of WFJC's final program on December 14, 1930

At the same time the FRC confirmed a forthcoming hearing for WFJC's application, George A. Richards, Leo J. Fitzpatrick and P. M. Thomas—owners of WJR in Detroit—incorporated the WGAR Broadcasting Company in order to establish "Cleveland's fourth radio station". On September 6, the company filed an application with the FRC for authorization to "consolidate stations WFJC and WCSO into a new station with new equipment at Cleveland Ohio", which was approved that same month. The WGAR Broadcasting Company took over ownership of WCSO on September 26, 1930, later recognized as a casualty of the Great Depression. WFJC was acquired seven days earlier. The deal was approved despite opposition from the chambers of commerce for both Akron and Cleveland, in addition to local community groups and competing Cleveland radio stations.

WCSO made its final broadcast on October 11, 1930, after coverage of the Wittenberg Tigers-Washington & Jefferson Presidents football game and its license was formally deleted at the end of the month. As construction for the new station began immediately, WFJC continued to broadcast from Akron until December 14; the December 13, 1930, Akron Beacon Journal informed its readers that WFJC would cease operations the next day at midnight, "to make way for WGAR, at Cleveland, which purchased its claim to the ether". In its fifth annual report, the FRC reported that, effective June 12, 1931, WCSO and WFJC had been consolidated "to form new station WGAR, Cleveland, Ohio". WADC eventually moved into the Beacon Journal building studios vacated by WFJC.
