= George A. Richards =

Former NFL team owner and radio station operator

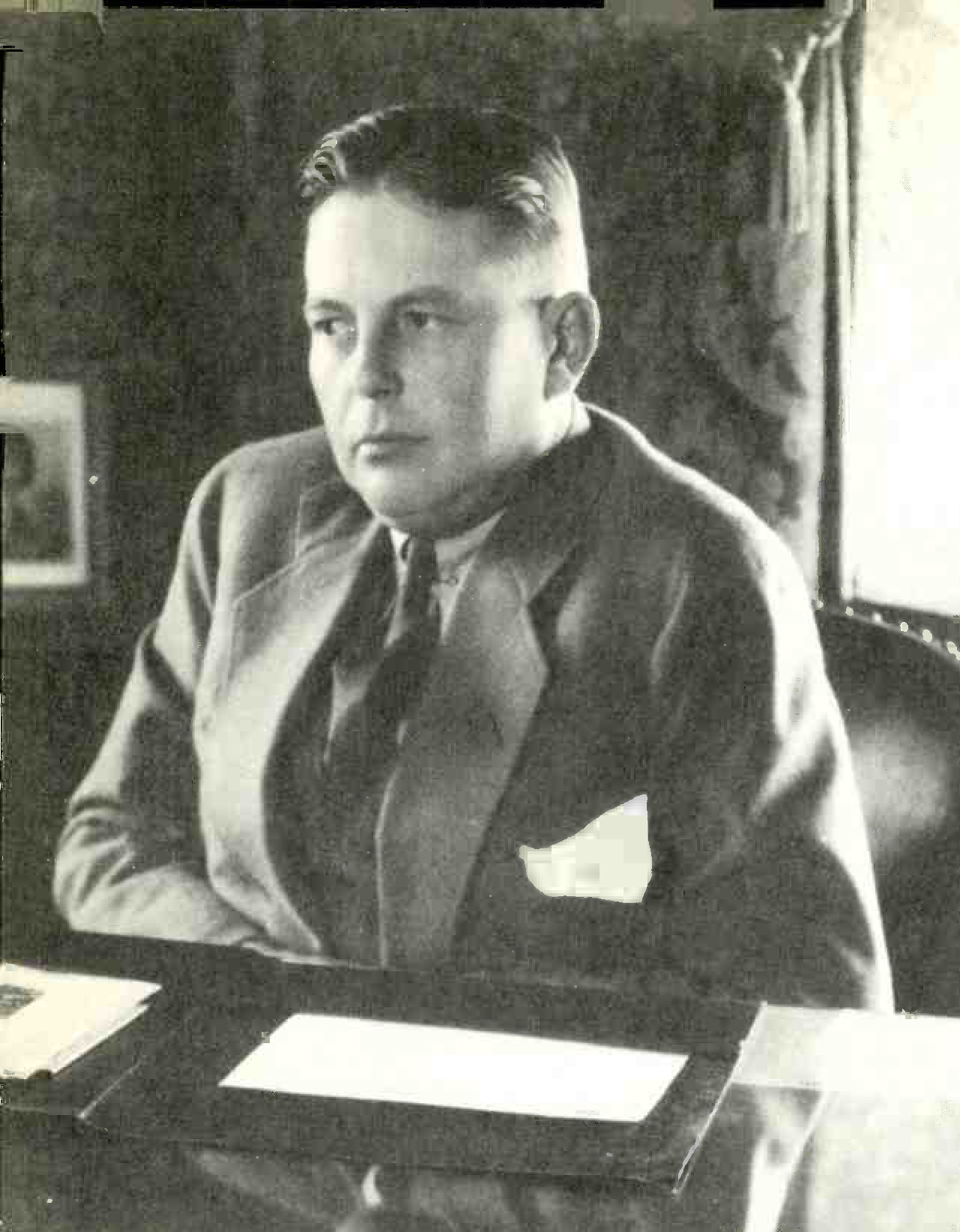
- Born: George Arthur Richards; March 9, 1889; Crete, Illinois, U.S.
- Died: May 28, 1951 (aged 62); Detroit, Michigan, U.S.
- Occupations: Radio station owner; NFL team owner
- Spouse: Frances Stevenson Richards (m. 1922)
- Children: 1

George Arthur Richards (March 9, 1889 – May 28, 1951) was an American radio executive who owned stations WJR in Detroit, KMPC in Los Angeles, and WGAR in Cleveland. From 1934 to 1940, he also owned the Detroit Lions of the National Football League. He played a major role in sponsoring the nationwide radio program of the politicized Catholic priest Charles Coughlin.

== Early life ==
Richards was born on March 9, 1889, in Crete, Illinois. At the age of fourteen he moved to Chicago and worked as an elevator operator. He held a variety of jobs until 1911, when he became a tire salesman for the Firestone Tire and Rubber Company. In 1912 he became the manager of the Firestone's Columbus, Ohio, branch. He was the youngest branch manager in company history.

In 1917, he joined Firestone's sales department in Detroit. Richards married Frances Stevenson on February 22, 1922, having met as the result of a horseback riding accident.

== Automotive dealer ==
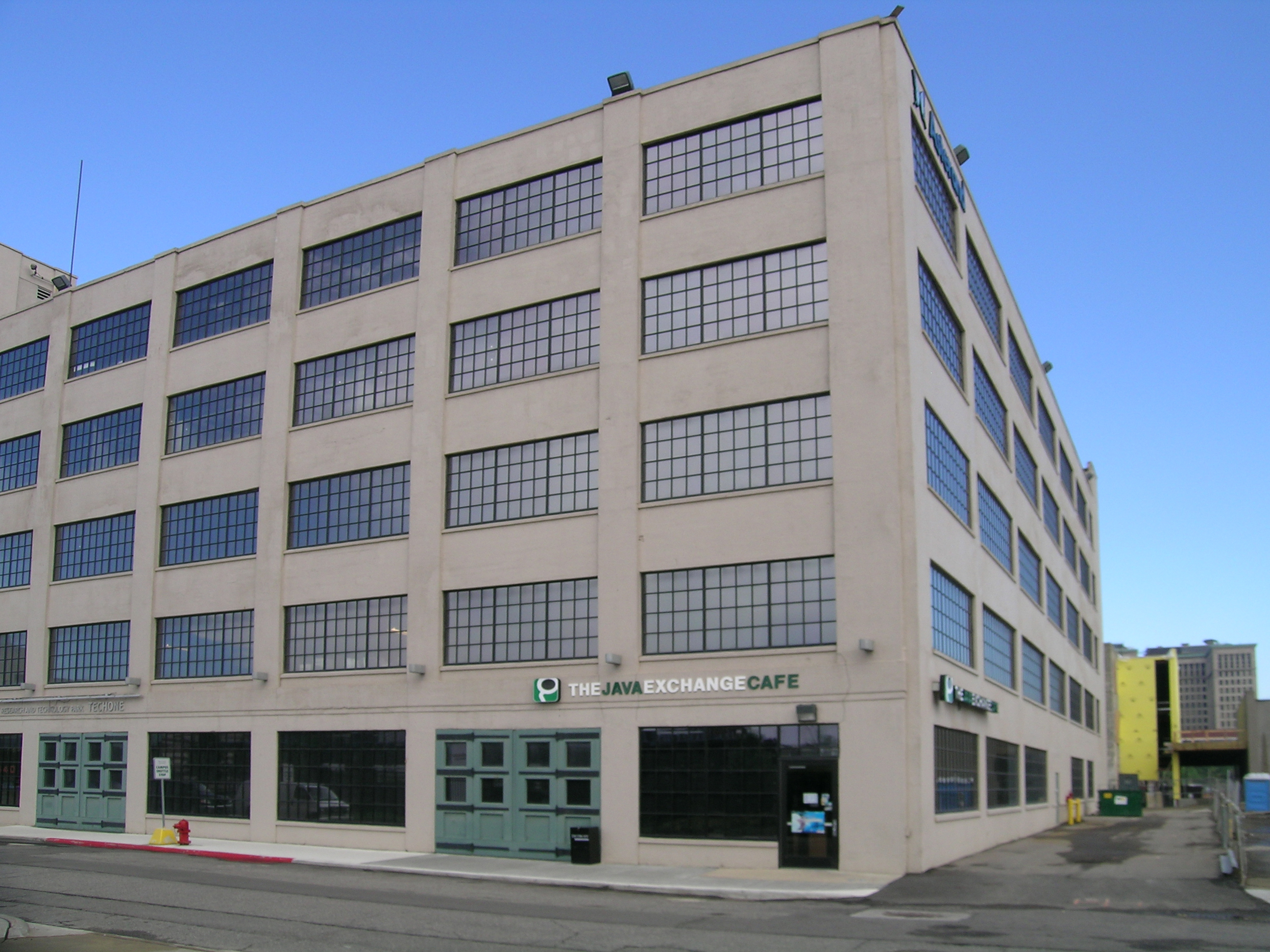
G. A. Richards Oakland Company Service Department, now TechTown, TechOne.

Richards left Firestone in 1921 to form the Cunningham-Richards Co., which was one of the highest selling Cunningham dealerships in the country. In 1924 he became the Oakland dealer for Metro Detroit. He sold Oaklands and Pontiacs until 1929, when he gave up his dealership to focus on radio.

== Radio ==
Richards first became involved in radio through advertising. His dealership was one of the first businesses in Detroit to advertise on radio. On December 25, 1926, Richards took over operations of Detroit station WJR (which officially operated as "WJR-WCX", a consolidated license where Richards owned "WJR" while the Detroit Free Press owned "WCX"). The takeover happened when founding owner Jewett Radio & Phonographic Co. was forced to put the station into bankruptcy; Richards was credited for helping the station successfully turn a profit.

General Order 40, a major reorganization of radio frequencies by the Federal Radio Commission (FRC) implemented later in the year, allowed WJR-WCX to be designated a clear-channel station. Richards moved "WJR" to new studios in the Fisher Building in December 1929, while WCX remained at the Free Press Building. By April 1929, Richards purchased WCX from the Free Press and WJR-WCX dropped the "WCX" call letters. WJR was upgraded to 50,000 watts in 1935.

In September 1930, Richards, along with WJR associates Leo J. Fitzpatrick and P. M. Thomas, purchased the assets of two stations—WCSO in Springfield, Ohio, and WFJC in Akron, Ohio, both operating on the same frequency under a time-share agreement—and consolidated them to form WGAR in Cleveland, Ohio, bearing his initials. WGAR signed on as the first NBC Blue affiliate in Cleveland. By September 1937, WGAR switched from NBC Blue to CBS. It was as a CBS affiliate that WGAR began producing multiple influential programs, including Wings Over Jordan and Cleveland Orchestra broadcasts over the network, and became a starting point for comedian Jack Paar's career.

Originally operating under facilities much weaker than WJR by comparison, a series of upgrades followed, including a frequency switch to 1220 kHz in June 1944 and a power increase to 50,000 watts in July 1947. In both cases, WGAR fought extensively in court with Akron CBS affiliate WADC, which twice petitioned the Federal Communications Commission (FCC) to take over WGAR's facilities.

After acquiring an option to purchase Los Angeles station KNX, only to relinquish it to CBS, Richards purchased crosstown KMPC on May 5, 1937. The purchase came as Richards began suffering varied health ailments, including a coronary thrombosis in 1938 that left him unable to do much heavy exercise, and necessitated his taking up a second residence in Beverly Hills.

=== Support for Father Coughlin ===
When Richards acquired WJR in Detroit in 1929, he encouraged Father Charles Coughlin to continue his weekly broadcasts and to focus on politics instead of religious topics. He became the chief financial backer and confidant for many years. In 1931, with backing by Richards, Coughlin established his own independently financed radio network for the Golden Hour of the Shrine of the Little Flower, with flagship WJR and WGAR in Cleveland, Ohio as core stations. Coughlin was reaching a weekly audience between 16 million and 30 million listeners, and every day he received 10,000 letters.

Throughout the 1930s, Coughlin's views changed as his audience grew. Eventually he was "openly antidemocratic", according to Steven Levitsky and Daniel Ziblatt, "calling for the abolition of political parties and questioning the value of elections". His views were seen as mirroring those of Richards himself, who had held reactionary conservative beliefs. Leo Fitzpatrick, who had given Coughlin his initial airtime over WJR in 1926 and was retained as a part-owner when Richards purchased the station, continued to serve as a confidant and advisor to Coughlin.

== Detroit Lions ==
In 1934, Richards purchased the Portsmouth Spartans for approximately $15,000 and moved the team to Detroit. He used his connections to have NBC broadcast Lions Thanksgiving Day games on its Blue Network. The game set a team attendance record and gave the fledgling league vital national exposure. In 1940, Richards, then living in Beverly Hills and in poor health, sold the team to Fred L. Mandel Jr. on the advice of his physician.

== Investigation into bias ==
Richards would be ensnared in 1948 by allegations of news policies instituted at KMPC under his name that encouraged manipulation and bias. The March 6, 1948, issue of Billboard contained memos attributed to Richards heavily implying antisemitism and anti-communism, repeatedly insisting that Jews were "all Communists" and insisted news personnel "keep hammering away at the Jews". Former KMPC newscaster Clete Roberts, accused Richards of firing him on insubordination grounds after refusing to omit unflattering details on a profile of Gen. Douglas MacArthur.

Roberts also stated Richards encouraged favorable reports on MacArthur and unfavorable coverage towards members of the Roosevelt family, Henry A. Wallace, the Truman administration and the New Deal, along with any stories on Palestine to be spiked so as not to "give aid and comfort to Jews and Communists". Maurie Starrels, another former KMPC staffer, charged that Richards demanded multiple news figures, including Bugsy Siegel, have their Jewish backgrounds heavily emphasized, and ordered the fabrication of a story regarding Edwin W. Pauley pursuing a Truman cabinet post.

Multiple members of Congress, the American Jewish Congress (AJC), the Americans for Democratic Action (ADA) and the Radio News Club of Hollywood (RNC), along with James Roosevelt, all called on the FCC to investigate. The AJC's petition stated that Richards "fomented hate among minorities" by blatantly flouting the Mayflower doctrine. The RNC's petition, based on the Billboard evidence, was taken up by the FCC, which ordered an initial examination of all three stations on March 25, 1948. The commission then ordered a public investigation for the stations on November 16, amid questions over Richards's qualifications as a license holder.

This investigation was delayed throughout 1949 as Richards proposed transferring all three stations to three trustees, and advised for a personal appearance before the FCC given his health condition; his physicians insisted any hearing could potentially kill Richards given his heart condition. The proposal was criticized by the National Community Relations Advisory Council (NCRAC) as neither of the three trustees were residents of Cleveland, Detroit or Los Angeles, while two of the trustees were known to espouse deeply conservative viewpoints.

Hearings commenced in Los Angeles on March 13, 1950, with FCC chief counsel Frederick W. Ford's opening statement accusing Richards of "slanting" and distorting news on his stations to "substantiate his personal dislikes". Clete Roberts testified Richards asked him to minimize coverage of President Harry S. Truman's speeches and present Republicans editorials during newscasts without labeling them as editorials, and link prominent Democrats to Communism. Roberts stated Richards insisted at a KMPC news staff meeting that there was "a plot afoot, a Jewish plot" involving CBS's William S. Paley, NBC's David Sarnoff and ABC's Robert E. Kintner, with Richards firing him after his news story about Gen. MacArthur denoted graying hair and a quivering hand.

A third former KMPC newscaster claimed Richards insisted "the CIO, Negroes, Jews, the Roosevelt family, and the New Deal never be presented in a favorable light". Another announcer testified Richards ordered the removal of be-bop recordings, viewing them as having "communistic influence". Jack Paar later corroborated a ban on "swing music" by Richards existed in his memoir, detailing a directive for WGAR to temporarily drop out of CBS programming whenever they played any selections. Sen. Styles Bridges demanded on the Senate floor for the FCC to be investigated over their FCC's investigation into Richards, considering it a punishment exerted by the agency for his political views.

Representatives Anthony F. Tauriello and Harry J. Davenport denounced Roberts on the House floor based on prior comments made by Roberts about southern Italians, while Rep. Stephen M. Young considered the hearings an overreach of the commission's authority. Richards' attorney Hugh Fulton accused the FCC of attempting to censor Richards because he did not support the Truman administration.

Presiding examiner J. Frederick Johnson Jr. died after recessing the hearings, which were restarted by James D. Cunningham on June 15. The FCC requested 7,000 news scripts from KMPC, and indicated the same request would be made for WJR and WGAR. A subpoena for Richards was issued at the insistence of Benedict Cottone but his health again became an issue when he did not obey the order. KMPC manager Robert O. Reynolds—who was on the witness stand for over a month—stated Richards' prior thrombosis left him physically unable to walk or climb steps, which was countered by an x-ray specialist who saw little evidence existed of an abnormal enlargement on his heart.

The FCC completed their prosecution at the end of August 1950, which saw 34 witnesses give 2,000,000 words on 8,000 pages of transcript during the course of 13 weeks. Richards' defense included Los Angeles mayor Fletcher Bowron praising Richards for KMPC's wartime public service record while his legal counsel cited coverage in People's World and The Nation as evidence that the hearings were inspired by the Communist Party.

The National Association of Broadcasters (NAB) condemned the investigation as an invasion of Richards' free speech right and privacy, prompting NCRAC to issue a reply criticizing the NAB's "misunderstanding of the necessary and natural functions" of the FCC. The hearings ended in mid-December 1950 with Richards' legal team withdrawing the trusteeship proposal and propose advisory councils for all three stations; Examiner Cunningham deemed the hearings for WGAR as unnecessary.

== Death and dispersals ==
On May 15, 1951, FCC chief counsel Benedict Cottone recommended the agency shut down Richards' stations as they had been put to partisan use, repeatedly violated FCC policy and failed to serve the public interest. Cottone also assailed the "contempt" Richards held for the agency. 13 days after the ruling, and before en banc oral arguments could take place, Richards died of an abdominal aortic aneurysm at age 62.

Fr. Coughlin was among the attendees at his funeral. Rev. James W. Fifield Jr.—who delivered the eulogy—condemned the FCC investigation, saying Richards had been "murdered ... by those who sought to destroy freedom". All proceedings were dismissed as moot on June 14, 1951; the legal fight ultimately cost Richards $2 million.

Widow Frances S. Richards was bequeathed all three stations and assured the FCC that they would adhere to a code eschewing bias in news reporting. The FCC renewed all three licenses and approved the ownership transfers to her name on November 28, 1951.

Early in 1952, Goodwill filed applications for multiple TV stations, including UHF signals in Cleveland and Detroit and VHF signals in Toledo, Ohio, Bay City, Michigan, and Flint, in hopes of establishing a regional television network. The June 30, 1952, issue of Broadcasting, however, reported NBC had been "negotiating intermittently" with Richards and his estate "for years" on a purchase of KMPC, with NBC recently selling off their Denver radio station to make it possible.

KMPC was sold that November, to a group headed by Gene Autry for $800,000 (equivalent to $9.7 million in 2025). WGAR and WGAR-FM were purchased by Peoples Broadcasting Corp. (a subsidiary of Farm Bureau Mutual, forerunner to Nationwide Insurance) on December 4, 1953, for $1.75 million (equivalent to $21.1 million in 2025), the largest purchase price for a radio station at that time.

WJR continued to operate under the Richards estate and "Goodwill" name, signing on Flint station WJRT-TV in 1958 and purchasing WSAZ-AM-TV in 1961. The Goodwill Stations were sold to Capital Cities Broadcasting in 1964 in a $21 million group deal. Richards's son-in-law, F. Sibley Moore, became a WJR executive in the early 1950s and became vice president of Capital Cities, a role he held until his death in June 1967.
