= Norm N. Nite =

Norm N. Nite (born Norman Durma, January 25, 1941), is the author of the Rock On: The Illustrated Encyclopedia of Rock N' Roll book series. Nite began his career as a disk jockey at WGAR (AM) in Cleveland and later at WMJI there. He went on to host shows at WCBS-FM and WNBC in New York City. Nite's historical interest in Rock & Roll led him to compile, as the first volume of "Rock On" describes it, "an exhaustive array of data on more than 1,000 of the most popular artists of the fifties and early sixties. Any singer who had a top 100 single during the golden days of rock n' roll can be found in (the) book." Subsequently, due to the popularity of this volume, first released in 1974, he authored a second volume in 1978, covering, as described on the dust jacket, "The Modern Years: 1964-Present" with an introduction by Wolfman Jack. In 1985 Rock On Volume 3 was released and billed "Rock On Volume 3 – The Video Revolution: 1978 – Present". During 1988 he narrated the radio program Solid Gold Scrapbook. From 1988-1990, Nite hosted a nationally syndicated oldies radio program on the Unistar Radio Network called U.S. Hall of Fame.

In July 2005, Nite began broadcasting live from the Rock and Roll Hall of Fame in Cleveland on Sirius Satellite Radio Channel 5 (Sirius Gold, now known as Sirius XM 50s on 5), which is also available on channel 9905 on the Dish Network. His show had originally aired Wednesdays through Sundays, but in August 2006, he cut back his on-air schedule to Fridays through Sundays from 3-6 p.m. US Eastern time (12-3 p.m. Pacific time).

From 2005 to 2014, Nite broadcast on Saturday and Sunday afternoons, presenting "Remember Then", an hour dedicated exclusively to the music that was on the charts on the corresponding date during a designated year, mainly between 1956 and 1963. The "Remember Then" hour aired between 4-5 p.m. Eastern (1-2 p.m. Pacific). Nite was an enthusiastic cheerleader of the music and its artists, and also did much to promote the 50s on 5 channel and its other on-air talent. In February 2014, SiriusXM made a sudden management move to drop live deejays from virtually all of its 50s on 5 programming, ending Nite's broadcasts without the chance to have a farewell broadcast. (Some deejays from the 50s on 5 New York studio were reassigned to weekday shifts on SiriusXM's more-favored 60s on 6 channel, including Pat St. John.)

Although Nite once split his time between New York City, New York and Cleveland, Ohio, he now lives in Cleveland full-time.
