= Jack G. Thayer =

American broadcasting executive and disc jockey

Jack G. Thayer (November 22, 1922 – January 1, 1995) was an American broadcasting executive and disc jockey. Born in Chicago, he began his career in radio as a disc jockey in Minneapolis, Cleveland, and Sacramento, California. He was president of the NBC Radio Network from 1974 through 1980, and then was head of WNEW-AM (now WBBR) in New York City. After this he served as the C.E.O. and executive vice president of Gear Broadcasting International, a subsidiary of Gear Telecommunications, from the mid 1980s until his death on New Year's Day 1995 at St. Joseph's Hospital in Providence, Rhode Island.
