= WONE =

WONE may refer to:

- WONE (AM), an AM radio station located in Dayton, Ohio
- WONE-FM, an FM radio station located in Akron, Ohio
