= WNWV =

Radio station in Elyria, Ohio, serving Cleveland

- Elyria, Ohio; United States
- Broadcast area: Greater Cleveland; Northeast Ohio
- Frequency: 107.3 MHz (HD Radio)
- Branding: 107.3 Alternative Cleveland

Programming
- Language: English
- Format: Alternative rock
- Subchannels: HD2: Christian pop

Ownership
- Owner: Rubber City Radio Group, Inc.
- Sister stations: WAKR; WONE-FM; WQMX

History
- First air date: October 17, 1948
- Former call signs: WEOL-FM (1948–1965); WBEA (1965–1987); WCZR (1987)
- Call sign meaning: Former "Wave" brand

Technical information
- Licensing authority: FCC
- Facility ID: 19462
- Class: B
- ERP: 20,000 watts
- HAAT: 238 meters (781 ft)
- Transmitter coordinates: 41°16′10.00″N 82°00′16.00″W

Links
- Public license information: Public file; LMS
- Webcast: Listen live
- Website: 1073cleveland.com

WNWV (107.3 FM, "107.3 Alternative Cleveland") is a commercial radio station licensed to Elyria, Ohio, United States, carrying an alternative rock format. Owned by Rubber City Radio Group, Inc., the station serves Greater Cleveland and much of surrounding Northeast Ohio. WNWV's studios are located in Akron, while the station transmitter resides off of South Island Road in Grafton. In addition to a standard analog transmission, WNWV broadcasts over two HD Radio subchannels and is available online; the second digital subchannel offers a Christian pop format as "FCB Faith".

This station originated as WEOL-FM, the FM adjunct to WEOL, and signed on the same day as its AM counterpart on October 17, 1948. Originally owned by the Elyria-Lorain Broadcasting Co., WEOL AM and FM spent over 15 years in litigation with The Lorain Journal over anticompetitive business practices with advertisers in Lorain, Ohio, that resulted in a Supreme Court decision, Lorain Journal Co. v. United States, a treble damages lawsuit, and two challenges to the licenses for both stations by the Journal. Debuting a nightly six-hour block of classical and high fidelity music in 1960, WEOL-FM became WBEA in February 1966, featuring an automated easy listening format aimed towards Lorain County. By 1982, WBEA switched to contemporary hits, then became WCZR on January 1, 1987, with a heavy metal format as a Z Rock affiliate aimed at Greater Cleveland. WCZR failed to generate revenue despite a cult following and switched again after 11 months to new age and smooth jazz as WNWV, "The Wave".

Originally satellite-delivered via a national feed of format progenitor KTWV, by 1990, WNWV's presentation became entirely local. Along with consistently high ratings, WNWV was also one of the few remaining locally-owned commercial radio stations in Northeast Ohio at the turn of the century. Declining ratings and demographic issues with the smooth jazz format precipitated a switch in 2010 to adult album alternative, first as "Boom! 107.3", then "107.3 Cleveland" and finally to "V107.3". Elyria-Lorain sold WNWV to Rubber City Radio Group at the end of 2011, where the prior "Wave" branding was revived but with a smooth AC focus. WNWV's format changed again to modern adult contemporary in January 2020 as "jenY 107.3" after a cryptic billboard campaign went viral. "jenY" gradually evolved into a straightforward alternative format before taking on the current branding in 2022.

== WEOL-FM (1948–1965) ==
Organized on December 10, 1945, in Elyria, Ohio, the Elyria-Lorain Broadcasting Co. filed paperwork with the Federal Communications Commission (FCC) on April 24, 1946, to construct an AM station, one month after filing for an FM station permit. In addition to multiple area businessmen that included Bendix president David O. Thomas as chairman, the leading stockholder in Elyria-Lorain was Roy W. Ammel, vice-president of the Elyria Telephone Company since 1941; Ammel previous achieved fame as the first pilot to fly nonstop from New York City to the Panama Canal in 1930. The FM application, one of 11 filed in the Cleveland, Akron and Elyria area, was reviewed by the FCC beginning in April 1946, where Elyria-Lorain argued that Cleveland stations did not adequately cover Lorain County. The FM permit to broadcast at 107.3 MHz was granted on June 30, 1947, alongside the ten other applicants, and the AM permit to broadcast at 930 kHz was granted on September 11, 1947.

By April 1948, both stations adopted the WEOL and WEOL-FM call signs, standing for Wellington, Elyria, Oberlin and Lorain. Bert Koeblitz, associated with WHK for over 17 years, was hired as general manager. In addition to studios at the Elyria Savings and Trust Building in downtown Elyria and transmitter in Grafton Township, auxiliary studios were constructed at Oberlin College and the Antlers Hotel in Lorain, a combined investment of $250,000. Both WEOL and WEOL-FM took to the air at 7:30 a.m. on October 17, 1948, with minimal fanfare; the first program consisted of organ music, staff were introduced on-air at 2 p.m. that afternoon. Among the initial air staff was cooking program host Alice Schowalter, who joined WEWS-TV several months later under the stage name Alice Weston.

Four area churches, including two affiliated with the Assemblies of God, filed complaints with the FCC of religious discrimination after WEOL declined to carry an interdenominational program days before the stations signed on. Ammel countered that the Assemblies of God were not a recognized religious body. On May 10, 1949, twelve off- and on-air staffers went on strike in a labor dispute, taking both stations off-air. Broadcasts were resumed one day later with replacement personnel and the transmitter towers were monitored by the Lorain County Sherriff. WEOL successfully sued Lorain's mayor, chief of police, and chief of public safety in July 1949 when they denied the station access to reports and information. By April 1950, Maurice Condon, former sidekick to Jack Paar and brother of Plain Dealer television editor George E. Condon, was named general manager. Condon was the sixth person in the role in two years; the instability was attributed to disagreements between management and Ammel. Ron Penfound was news and sports director in the early 1950s before becoming "Captain Penny" at WEWS, and longtime WJW-TV reporter Neil Zurcher was news director in the mid-1960s.

When WEOL AM/FM were established, The Lorain Journal, which held a monopoly on advertising revenue and news coverage in Lorain, instituted policies to intimidate and dissuade Journal advertisers from associating likewise with WEOL. In late 1949, the U.S. Justice Department sued the newspaper for violating the Sherman Antitrust Act; the subsequent trial in U.S. Northern Ohio district court found the Journal guilty of these charges and ordered them to cease said policies. The Journal appealed to the U.S. Supreme Court, which upheld the verdict in the 1951 ruling, Lorain Journal Co. v. United States. Elyria-Lorain then filed a treble damages lawsuit against the Journal in 1951 for revenue lost due to the Journal's policies, and the Journal unsuccessfully challenged the license renewals for WEOL and WMAN in Mansfield, Ohio, who also sued the publishers for damages. The lawsuit was retried twice, once after the paper was acquitted of the charges, and again after the judgement was seen as too low, before being settled by 1967.

On April 1, 1958, the Lorain County Printing and Publishing Company (LCP&P), publishers of the Elyria Chronicle-Telegram, purchased all Elyria-Lorain stock held by Roy Ammel for $214,200. LCP&P president Otto Schoepfle called the transaction an opportunity for the Chronicle to extend itself into broadcasting; Schoepfle was named president of Elyria-Lorain when the deal closed and Paul Nakel, formerly of WJMO, was hired as general manager. LCP&P filed to acquire all stock in Elyria-Lorain owned by the Loren M. Berry foundation in September 1964, which the FCC initially approved but was set aside after the Journal filed an objection. The Journal's protest ran concurrently with Elyria-Lorain objecting to the Journal's full acquisition of Lorain station WWIZ, filed after the paper purchased a stake in that station in exchange for voting and nonvoting preferred stock. The Journal withdrew from the case as the evidentiary hearing began, and the stock transfer and license renewals were granted on October 6, 1966.

== WBEA (1965–1987) ==
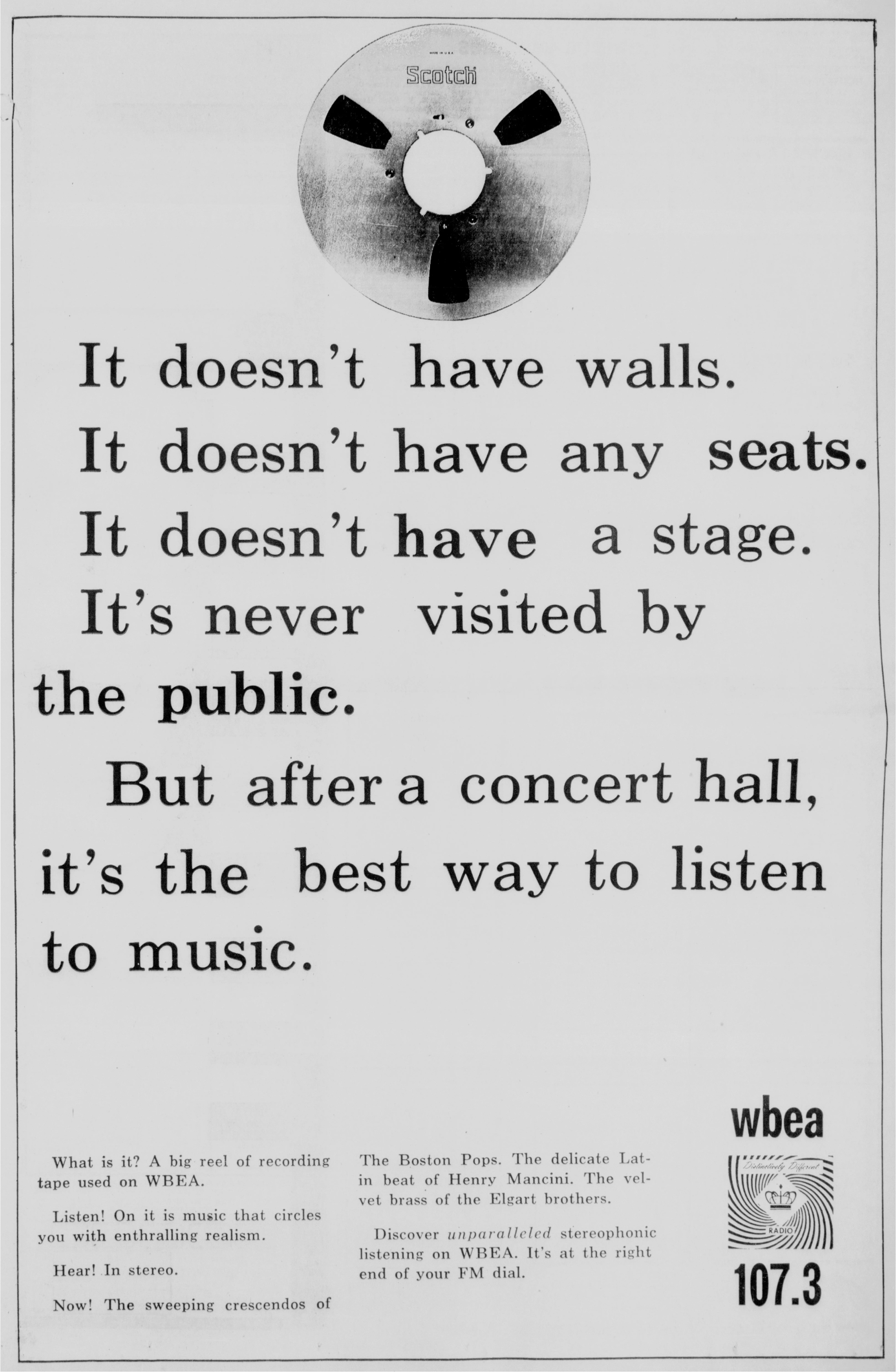
1969 newspaper ad promoting WBEA's automated beautiful music format

In a May 1958 column for the Chronicle-Telegram, WEOL announcers Dick Conrad and Jeff Baxter teased the possibility of WEOL-FM airing separate programming largely centered around classical music and high fidelity recordings. On March 11, 1960, WEOL-FM debuted "Formula 107", a nightly six-hour program block of classical, opera and Broadway musicals. "Formula 107" was developed after positive reception of a Sunday night stereophonic program over WEOL, sponsored by the Chronicle.

WEOL-FM was renamed WBEA on December 7, 1965, the call sign stood for Bea Nakel, Paul Nakel's wife. WBEA debuted an easy listening format on February 24, 1966, with the activation of a new transmitter tower built at the Grafton site. Nicknamed the "Velvet Sound", WBEA boasted 100,000 watts of power (50,000 watts with both horizontal and vertical polarization) and a coverage area of 500 square miles (1,300 km^{2}). The separation followed the FCC's enacting of the FM Non-Duplication Rule, which mandated FM stations no longer could fully duplicate the programming of their AM adjuncts. The station was heavily automated, with one computer operating two tape decks for music and one tape deck for commercials in state-of-the-art facilities; by 1971, WBEA aired eight newscasts daily and one commercial every 15 minutes. In 1981, WBEA picked up the Drake-Chenault "Beautiful Music Plus" format. WBEA and WEOL moved to new studios at 538 Broad Street in July 1982, again in Elyria's downtown.

WBEA changed to contemporary hits—a hybrid of Top 40, soft rock, album rock and oldies—on January 31, 1983, re-branded as "B-107". Developed by Burkhart/Abrams, the new format consisted of taped music along with local news updates, features and in-studio announcers. Paul Nakel retired in 1984 and was succeeded as general manager by Gary Kneisley; under Kneisley, Drew Bentley was hired as program director, tasked with infusing personality and making WBEA "a foreground station". During a publicity stunt in July 1985, morning host Mike Patrick attempted to sit in all 79,201 bleacher seats at Cleveland Municipal Stadium in a fund-raiser for the Lorain County American Red Cross. The stunt lasted around the clock for five days before Patrick gave up. In the spring of 1986, Arbitron combined Lorain County into the Greater Cleveland radio market, making WBEA a Cleveland-market station.

== WCZR (1987) ==
On December 21, 1986, Elyria-Lorain announced WBEA would switch to heavy metal under the WCZR call sign, effective January 1, 1987. The station would affiliate with Z Rock, a 24/7 syndicated format operated by Satellite Music Network (SRN). WBEA's airstaff was dismissed, but program director Drew Bentley was retained. General manager Gary Kneisley was approached by SRN representatives in Chicago where he listened to the format for a two-hour span, and justified the switch by telling The Plain Dealer, "... there are eight other stations in greater Cleveland playing the same music". WCZR was the third affiliate for Z Rock, following WZRC in Chicago and WCXT in Grand Rapids, Michigan. Z Rock's status as a wholly-syndicated format was criticized by Bob Dyer of the Akron Beacon Journal, who noted, "[p]utting a syndicated service on the air is cheaper than hiring an experienced, competent disc jockey. And the presentation is much better than it would be if a station hired a raw rookie for minimal pay."

By March, retail sales of metal albums reported significant increases in greater Cleveland, largely attributed to Z Rock. The station and network positioned themselves as catering to younger demographics largely ignored by commercial radio. WCZR was scrutinized after a Chester Township teenager committed suicide on August 30, and "Z Rock" stickers were found throughout his room, leading his parents to suggest a correlation with heavy metal music. A statement by Bentley to The Plain Dealer expressed condolences and said, "[o]ur music is intended to entertain our audience and is subject to the interpretation of the listener as are all types of artistic expression".

== WNWV (1987–present) ==
=== Smooth jazz "Wave" era ===
Despite WCZR's cult following and some increased ratings (the Akron Birch Survey reported WCZR's audience share doubled between the spring and fall books) by the end of October, Elyria-Lorain confirmed the station would switch again to new-age, soft rock and smooth jazz as "The Wave" on November 15, 1987, with new WNWV calls. The Wave Network was also syndicated by SRN and followed an identical format switch by WZRC weeks earlier. Kneisley said, "[w]e feel bad for our heavy metal audience, but we just can't wait two or three years to see the kind of growth we'd anticipated". SRN's Wave Network was initially a syndicated version of KTWV in Los Angeles and like KTWV, featured no air talent but locally, WNWV utilized announcer Chris Daniels for mornings. Among protests, marches and letter-writing campaigns, Z Rock listeners began graffiti tagging "Z Rock Lives", including on a billboard promoting WNWV, prompting Cleveland City Council to pass an ordinance holding Elyria-Lorain liable for cleanup. A petition calling for the return of Z Rock gathered 5,000 signatures, 90 percent of them between the ages of 18 to 40.

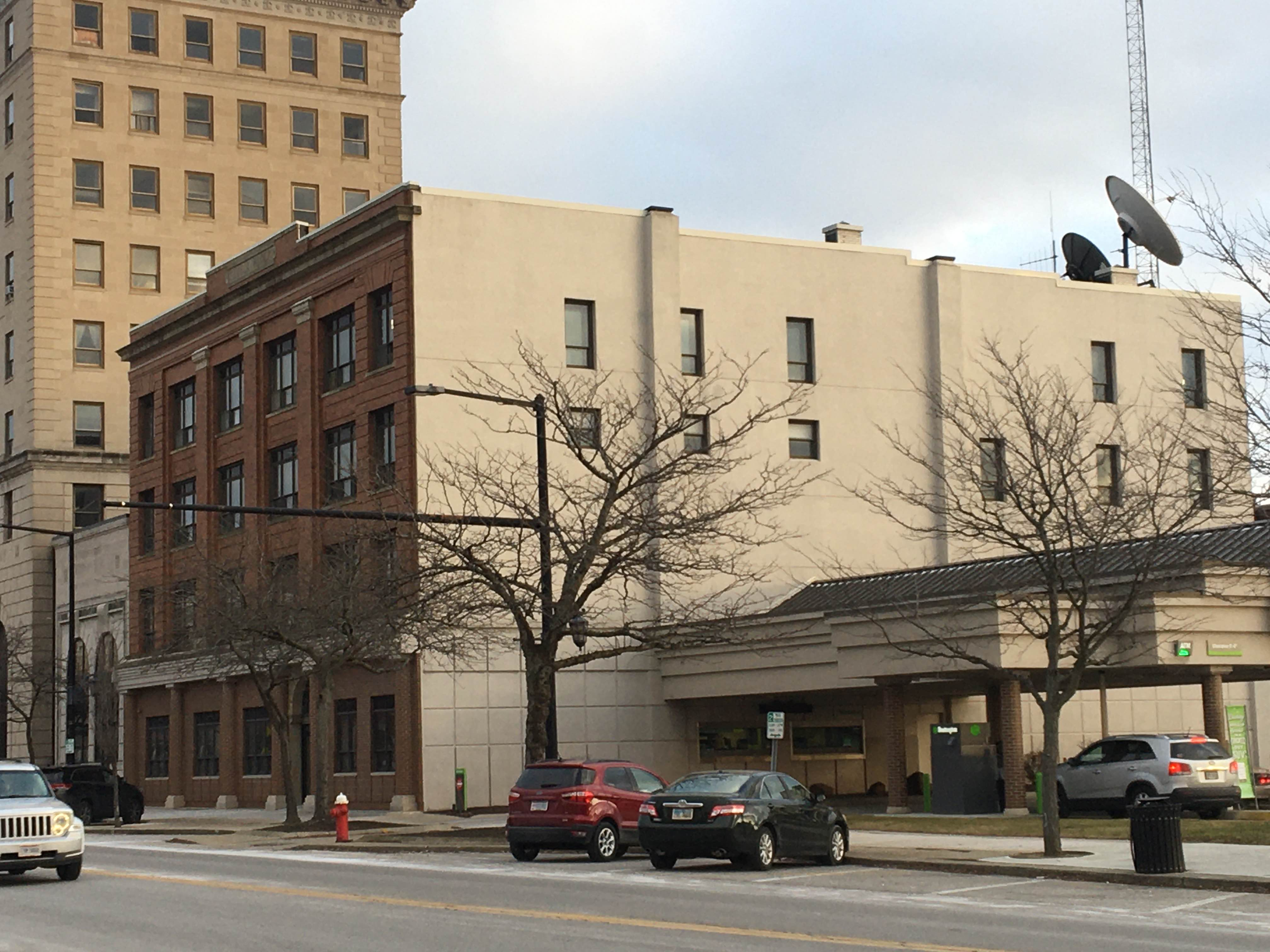
WBEA/WCZR/WNWV was located at the 538 Block building in downtown Elyria from 1982 to 2011.

Magazine ads taken out by WNWV promoted the lack of personalities, while the station featured a telephone hotline that told callers what song was currently playing. Coupled with a television ad campaign featuring saxophonist David Sanborn, WNWV saw ratings success, jumping to a 3.5 share in the Spring 1988 Arbitron ratings, and a 4.5 in the Spring 1988 Birch Survey. By September 1988, the Wave Network began adding personalities, this followed SRN's iteration becoming independent from KTWV and ran concurrently with KTWV adding air talent. Consultant Lee Abrams was hired by SRN in February 1990 to oversee the Wave Network and de-emphasized the amount of instrumentals played in favor of songs from traditional AOR artists; Abrams told the Plain Dealer, "[w]e want music that's mellow but never wimpy. And we want to get away from that whole California kind of thing—that audio valium." These changes proved unpopular and led WNWV to end their SRN contract two months in advance, on September 18, 1990. Bernie Kimble, formerly of WHK and WNCX, was hired as program director and midday host and was tasked with assembling a local airstaff and music library in three weeks when the station had neither. Kneisley said, "we had horn-withdrawal, so our first day [with local hosts] was devoted to all-saxophone music".

Under Kimble, "The Wave" placed an emphasis on announcing every song played. WNWV aired WEOL-produced news in morning drive and Dow Jones Money Reports throughout the day; by 1992, WNWV hired a newscaster of their own, owing to listener demand and increased workload on WEOL staff. Kimble left WNWV in March 1993 to program WJJZ in Philadelphia and was succeeded by Steve Hibbard; after Hibbard left in May 1995, Kimble returned. By 1996, the station began featuring their on-air hosts broadcasting remotely to locations around the region. Through the late 1990s and the 2000s, WNWV's airstaff consisted of Tom Murphy in mornings, Mark Ribbins in middays and Richard Greer in afternoons. The station's overall stability and minimum talk by the air talent, led WNWV to finish among the top ten most listened-to stations in Cleveland by 1999, and repeatedly pulled the highest shares among all smooth jazz stations nationwide. WNWV was nominated for the National Association of Broadcasters Marconi Award for "Jazz Station of the Year" in 1995, 1997, 2000 and 2001, winning in 1995 and 2001.

Bernie Kimble left WNWV in June 2008 and was succeeded as program director by Angie Handa. After Richard Greer's departure that September, Mark Ribbins replaced Greer in afternoon drive, and Handa became midday host. Tom Murphy left in June 2009, with Mike Kessler taking over in morning drive.

=== Adult album alternative: from "Boom!" to "V107.3" ===
WNWV began offering a second HD digital subchannel in the fall of 2008, programmed by Ric "Rocco" Bennett, formerly with WMMS and WENZ. This channel gradually evolved into "Boom! 107.3", an adult album alternative (AAA) format with general manager Lonnie Gronek's encouragement, Gronek likening it to "programming a radio station in a garage". Gronek and Bennett worked together at WMMS in the late 1980s. The development of "Boom! 107.3" came as Arbitron's adoption of the Portable People Meter (PPM) in multiple large markets revealed the core demographics for smooth jazz were older than initially thought, despite WNWV's perennially strong ratings. Veteran programmer John Gorman, who had been drafting up an AAA format of his own later realized as oWOW Radio, offered his consultancy services after learning about Bennett and Gronek's project.

On December 21, 2009, Elyria-Lorain announced "Boom! 107.3" would move to WNWV's analog channel and the smooth jazz format would move to WNWV-HD2. Gronek touted the AAA format as being able to provide listeners an alternative from repetitious playlists and touted WNWV's locally-owned status, claiming such a format was not possible among other stations in the market owned by Clear Channel Broadcasting, CBS Radio and Salem Communications. Bennett equally considered himself and the station as "taking on The Man". The switch occurred on December 28 after stunting with the sound of a clock ticking for 12 hours. Mike Gallagher—the former "Mike Kessler"—hosted mornings, Ravenna Miceli (Gorman's wife and formerly with WMJI) hosted middays, and Bennett hosted afternoons.

Three weeks after the switch, "Boom! 107.3", intended as a tribute to Len "Boom" Goldberg, who Bennett worked with at WMMS, was abruptly re-branded "107.3 Cleveland" and again as "V107.3" by March. The renaming came after CBS Radio filed a cease and desist order as they held a trademark to the "Boom" brand; the trademark is currently owned by Urban One. Gronek later revealed staff held some misgivings about the "Boom!" brand in the days leading up to launch.

=== Return of the "Wave" and smooth AC ===
They were snakebit from the start. Everything that could go wrong for them did, starting with the financial crash. It's pretty easy for me to look back and think: "What were they thinking?" But at the time, who knew?

— Thom Mandel, Rubber City Radio Group owner/general manager, on the failure of WNWV's AAA format

Elyria-Lorain sold WNWV to the Rubber City Radio Group (RCRG), owner of three radio stations in Akron, Ohio, on October 13, 2011, for $6.5 million. As part of the deal, WNWV was required to move as Elyria-Lorain retained the existing Elyria studio facility for WEOL. LCP&P chairman Paul Martin noted that WNWV's status as a Cleveland metro station contrasted with Elyria-Lorain being "really a community organization", making the sale a logical move. While RCRG was initially opaque about the AAA format's future, by December 7, RadioInsight reported the domain name "1073thewave.net" had been registered. The following day, Cleveland Scene confirmed the staff for "V107.3" was to be dismissed and WNWV would switch back to "The Wave" on December 16, the same day RCRG's purchase was consummated. RCRG owner/general manager Thom Mandel later told The Plain Dealer "V107.3" was "snakebit from the start" and "[t]hey were having a horrible time selling advertising because advertisers couldn't figure out who or what they were. The ratings sucked. ... I'm pretty sure any station I would create for my own enjoyment would be a disaster."

Contrary to the Scene report that the new iteration of "The Wave" would be smooth jazz, RCRG billed the new format as smooth AC largely centered around jazz-influenced vocals; RadioInsight publisher Lance Venta theorized this was to distinguish it from smooth jazz and to prevent a potential audience backlash which Mandel later confirmed, saying "[w]e think of Cleveland as a sort of gritty urban-city-streets kinda of a place, and the 'new' Wave reflects that". Akron Beacon Journal columnist Malcolm X Abram praised the switch, writing, "Rubber City Radio Group is essentially flouting a couple of years worth of national trends in the terrestrial radio industry to serve YOU, so here's your chance to make your voices and listening preferences heard (smoothly, of course)". The smooth AC switch took place at 8:30 p.m. on January 3, 2012, following a stunting period of Christmas music. Mark Ribbins returned to the station as midday host and program director after being personally approached by Mandel; Ribbins was joined by Dan Deely in mornings, Bobby Thomas in afternoons and Lynn Kelly (voice-tracked from RCRG's WQMX) in evenings. By 2013, Grace Roberts joined Deely as co-host and station community affairs director.

=== Switch to modern AC "jenY" and alternative ===
Mark David Ribbins
(@JazzPreacher)
tweeted:

I really hope that I don't know #whoisjeny, but I think I really do.

December 9, 2019

WNWV switched to Christmas music on November 15, 2019, as "Christmas on The Wave". Initially thought to be a format break for the holiday season, Cleveland Scene reported on December 3 that WNWV was planning on a flip away from smooth AC at or before Christmas. RadioInsight and the Plain Dealer confirmed the airstaff would be dismissed at the end of the week and WNWV, regarded as "the last big market smooth jazz station", was considering either soft AC or simulcasting RCRG's WQMX's country format. While promoting a concert in the Akron area earlier in the year, Boney James noted WNWV was "one of the very last terrestrial stations playing this kind of music, whatever it is we're calling it. I like to call it 'Boney James music' and not get into those other labels."

On November 27, 2019, Reddit posters commented on a series of billboards appearing in Greater Cleveland simply bearing the hashtag "#WhoIsJeny", which was followed by cryptic social media accounts on Twitter and Instagram set up for the campaign. While speculation over "#WhoIsJeny" centered around a possible publicity stunt tied to WMMS morning show Rover's Morning Glory, RadioInsight reported on December 9 the domain name "jeny1073.com" had been registered anonymously on October 30 and theorized the billboards were actually viral marketing for a new format on WNWV. Mark Ribbins confirmed his departure from WNWV on Twitter the same day and implied it was connected to "#WhoIsJeny". By December 23, RCRG registered a trademark for "107.3 JENY".

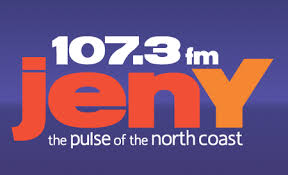
"jenY 107-3" logo unveiled following the "#WhoIsJeny" billboard campaign

WNWV dropped the Christmas music format and "Wave" brand on December 30, switching to a temporary simulcast of WQMX. This simulcast ended on January 3, 2020, at 9:30 a.m.; after a 30-minute stunting sequence, the station relaunched with a modern adult contemporary format branded "jenY 107-3". Area media coverage interpreted the launch as "(#WhoIsJeny) isn't about a person, but a generation"; phonetically pronounced as "Jenny", the visual rendering of "jenY" is a word play on "Generation Y", an alternate term for the millennial demographic.

WNWV's format shifted to alternative rock in the fall of 2020, but initially eschewed gold titles from the 1990s, retaining the "jenY" branding. By November 12, 2021, WNWV switched to a jockless presentation, with existing air talent moved to other Rubber City stations. The "jenY" brand was dropped on January 17, 2022, in favor of "107.3 Alternative Cleveland". Brady Marks joined the station in 2021, moved to mornings at the start of 2024 and was promoted to program director in January 2025. By May 2025, Marks co-hosted mornings with Aaron Lux; and by September 2026, Marks began hosting mornings solo, and Lux moved to middays. Tony McGinty, formerly with iHearMedia Akron-Canton, joined WNWV for afternoon drive in July 2026.

In July 2024, WNWV's HD2 digital subchannel carried a Spanish-language contemporary hits format as "Rumba 107.3 HD2", programmed by Omega Media Broadcasting. This subchannel switched to Christian pop in April 2026 under an agreement with First Class Broadcasting, bringing their digital platform "FCB Faith" to terrestrial radio for the first time.

== Current programming ==
WNWV's local personalities include Brady Marks in mornings, Aaron Lux in middays and Tony McGinty in afternoons, along with Matt Rybar and Steffany Nicole.
