= WZIP =

Radio station in Akron, Ohio

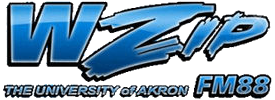
- Akron, Ohio; United States
- Broadcast area: Akron metro area
- Frequency: 88.1 MHz
- Branding: Z88

Programming
- Format: Rhythmic CHR

Ownership
- Owner: University of Akron

History
- First air date: December 10, 1962
- Former call signs: WAUP (1962–89); WZIP-FM (1989)
- Call sign meaning: "Akron Zips"

Technical information
- Licensing authority: FCC
- Facility ID: 66613
- Class: B
- ERP: 7,500 watts
- HAAT: 250 m (820 ft)
- Transmitter coordinates: 41°04′58″N 81°38′02″W

Links
- Public license information: Public file; LMS
- Webcast: Listen live
- Website: wzip.uakron.edu

WZIP (88.1 FM) is a non-commercial educational radio station licensed to Akron, Ohio, carrying a college radio–programmed rhythmic CHR format known as "Z88". Owned by the University of Akron, the station serves the Akron metro area. WZIP's studios are located in Kolbe Hall on the University of Akron campus, while the station transmitter resides in Copley Township. In addition to a standard analog transmission, WZIP is available online.

The station was established by the university as WAUP in 1962 and has served as a training ground for students in the university's School of Communication throughout its history. After broadcasting primarily educational programming and fine arts fare in its early years, it aired a jazz format from the mid-1970s until the mid-1980s, when it adopted its present hit radio orientation.

== History ==
Even prior to the launch of a dedicated broadcast station, the University of Akron already had decades of involvement with radio programming. In 1927, the Radio Workshop began over station WADC, and university programs aired on various AM and FM stations in the Akron area, as well as WJW in Cleveland. In December 1952, a carrier current station, "WUOA", had opened and was audible on the campus.

On December 8, 1961, the university applied to the Federal Communications Commission (FCC) for a construction permit to build an FM station to broadcast with an effective radiated power of 2,931 watts. The original application specified 91.5 MHz, but it was amended to specify 88.1 MHz (to be vacated by WKSU at Kent State University), and the FCC approved on March 19, 1962. The antenna was erected in late September, and WAUP ("Akron University Programs") made its debut on December 10, 1962, from studios in Kolbe Hall. It originally broadcast for four hours a day with a variety of campus news, taped educational discussions, and fine arts programming. Broadcast time expanded to 50 hours a week by 1969, and by the mid-1970s, the station was airing jazz 13 hours a day during the week.

After the 1970 Kent State shootings, university officials feared the potential takeover of WAUP by "radicals" who might use it to disseminate their messages. As a result, they installed a secret power switch somewhere in Kolbe Hall that could be used to disconnect power to the station's studios in the building were something to happen. A 1996 renovation of the building turned up the switch in a wall panel on the building's second floor.

In 1981, the station was approved by the university to lease space on a new tower in Copley Township that was being built by WEAO television, in which the University of Akron is a member; to compensate for increased height, the power was dropped to 330 watts (with the provision for more if stations in Berea and Bainbridge could be relocated to other frequencies). The improved facility would increase the station's coverage area from an estimated 500,000 to 2 million people and improve the station's reliability by providing a more consistent electrical supply. The reduced power would also reduce cable interference on the campus and save on electricity. In 1984, the university applied for use of a directional antenna at higher power; the station also switched from jazz to a contemporary hit radio format.

In 1989, the university reached an agreement with WZIP, a radio station in Jupiter, Florida, to share the call sign (until that station changed later in the year) and adopt WZIP for itself, in reference to the Zips, the athletics mascot. The move coincided with the activation of the higher-power facility, increasing its coverage area. Bigger changes were also announced in the wake of the new designation: the university ended its decades-long arrangement with commercial station WAKR to air its athletics events, believing that WAKR had higher priorities than its football and basketball contests; in addition, the studios in Guzzetta Hall were expanded.

The university then proceeded to cancel all 22 hours of specialty ethnic programs it had aired on weekends, citing an increased interest by students in the AU communications program. This decision led to some outcry from the programs' producers and listeners; a 242-word letter from Cleveland mayor George Voinovich, expressing that he was "totally amazed and disappointed"; and a complaint from a university faculty member asking for action in connection with WZIP's license renewal. The programs resurfaced at the start of 1990 on WAPS, the station of Akron Public Schools. In their stead, the station aired several public affairs programs, one or two hours of international music, and a Sunday "Ziprock Hot 100 Countdown" with university guests. Most Zips athletics events moved back to commercial radio in 1992 when the university joined the Mid-American Conference.

In 1998, WZIP increased its power to 7,500 watts after a multi-year effort, adding Mansfield, Cleveland, and Youngstown to its fringe coverage area; several stations in the region had changed their antenna patterns or frequencies, which allowed for the power increase. It returned to Kolbe Hall as part of a $7.4 million renovation of the building. The station occupied most of the remodeled facility's third floor, with new studios.

A subcarrier of WZIP also provides the region's radio reading service, Seeing Eye Radio, which is owned by the local affiliate of Goodwill Industries. Goodwill acquired the service in 2009 after it became financially insolvent; the university forgave half of a $19,000 debt it was owed for broadcasting the service.
