= OWOW Radio =

Internet radio station in Cleveland (2015–2021)

Coordinates: 41°29′2.70″N 81°44′21.20″W

oWOW Radio
- Cleveland, Ohio; United States
- Broadcast area: Greater Cleveland; Northeast Ohio; Worldwide
- Frequency: Online only
- Branding: oWOW! Cleveland

Programming
- Language: English
- Format: Adult album alternative

Ownership
- Owner: Wow Media, LLC

History
- First air date: February 20, 2015
- Last air date: January 17, 2021

oWOW Radio, stylized and marketed as oWOW! Radio or oWOW! Cleveland, was a commercial internet radio station based in Cleveland, Ohio, United States, that primarily served Greater Cleveland and surrounding Northeast Ohio. Independently owned by Wow Media, LLC, the station streamed an adult album alternative (AAA) format promoted as "timeless rock" and was co-founded and programmed by veteran radio executive/consultant John Gorman.

Launched first as a website in 2014, oWOW Radio made its streaming debut on February 20, 2015, with studios and offices at the 78th Street Studios complex in Cleveland's Detroit–Shoreway neighborhood. Due to expenses exceeding revenue for years, and then the economic effects of the COVID-19 pandemic both regionally and nationally, oWOW Radio announced its shutdown in September 2020, dropped all on-air staff on October 2, 2020, and ceased operations entirely on January 17, 2021.

== History ==
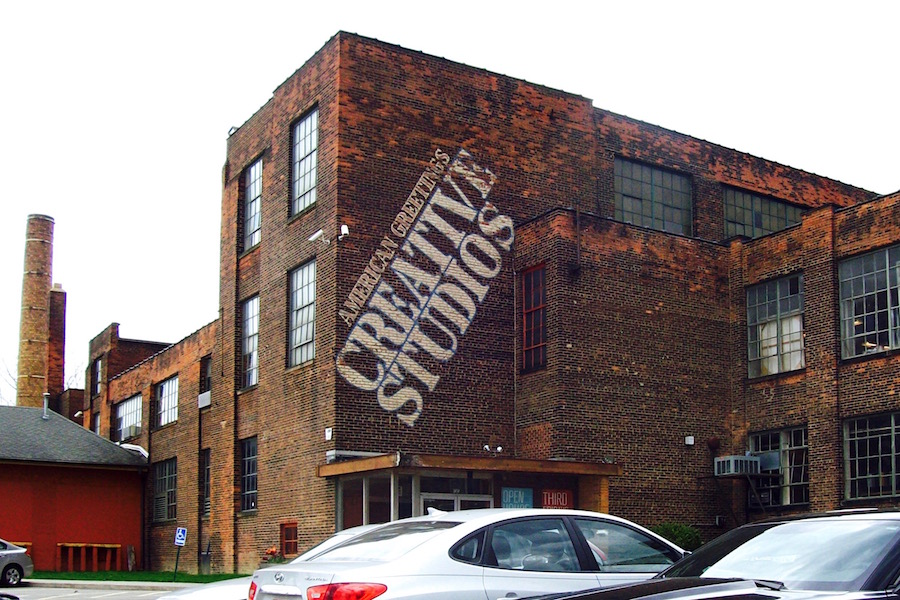
78th Street Studios complex

Radio programmer John Gorman, known for stints at longtime Cleveland rock station WMMS and oldies station WMJI, stated he first saw potential for Internet radio in the mid-1990s. Gorman recalled growing frustrated with the radio industry at that time, citing among other things a general lack of creativity, including for online streaming. He believed the success of Pandora and Spotify many years later helped establish Internet radio as a more viable alternative for radio listeners. On February 20, 2015, oWOW Radio launched in a small, temporary studio while construction continued on what became its 1,600-square foot facility located at the 78th Street Studios complex in the Gordon Square Arts District, part of the Detroit–Shoreway neighborhood on Cleveland's west side.

Funding for oWOW Radio was acquired through private investors, including Bass Energy, traditional bank loans, and a small business grant from the city of Cleveland. Serving as chief content officer, Gorman recruited former WMMS director of marketing Jim Marchyshyn to manage sales; the two functioned as oWOW's "principal partners" until Marchyshyn's death. John Chaffee, former president of Malrite Communications, was announced as a consultant in late April 2015. Veteran local radio personalities were hired for regular on-air shifts, and illustrator David Helton, best known for designing WMMS's Buzzard mascot, designed oWOW Radio's logo.

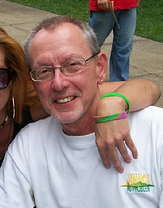
John Gorman

A frequent critic of traditional radio, Gorman compared terrestrial AM and FM stations to fax machines, "a dated appliance in the digital age" unable to win back former consumers now opting to use streaming platforms. He also believed services like Pandora and Spotify had a limited ability to serve local markets, and despite their successes, were used for specific wants of listeners and could not present an "element of surprise". oWOW actively targeted Northeast Ohio listeners, a local approach emphasized during an "uphill battle" to find advertising clients. RadioInsight.com speculated that oWOW Radio might find a "niche local audience" while Radio Ink described their playlist as "macro-local". Daryl Rowland of The Huffington Post suggested broadcasters and entrepreneurs could take notice if oWOW Radio were to be successful, saying "something could be in the air -- or in the fiber-optic cables and cell signals". Industry analyst Sean Ross retrospectively noted that oWOW Radio "... was trying to be a local Cleveland station that just happened not to have an FM antenna". Emphasizing this localism, the station participated in a monthly "third Friday" at the 78th Street Studios, allowing visitors to tour the station and meet the air talent.

What used to get people interested in radio was that it was exciting... You looked in. You saw the DJ and you thought: this is cool. We are in show business. That's been forgotten.

— Jim Marchyshyn, oWOW sales and marketing director

On-air talent included former Ravenna Miceli (formerly of WMJI and WNWV), Steve Pappas (a former WQAL morning show producer), Chuck Matthews (formerly of WMJI and WMMS, and other stations around the country). Matthews, a national voiceover talent, also served as Production/Imaging Director, creating the audio branding for oWOW. Several weekly programs were introduced: Friday Night Live featured recordings of live rock concerts, Alan Greene hosted a weekly blues-themed program titled Blues Time, and WKYC reporter Monica Robins hosted a weekly acoustic music program titled Naked Brunch. oWOW Radio was also an early promoter for local rock band Welshly Arms, with Gorman calling an oWOW rebroadcast of the band's November 2015 concert at The Beachland Ballroom "... that next step in their career (successful artists encounter) by experiencing that singular magical moment. One that will forever be referenced. For Welshly Arms it was this show." The station was awarded "Best Single Streaming Webcaster" by an independent panel at the 2015 RAIN Internet Radio Awards in Atlanta, Georgia.

Due expenses exceeding revenue for years, and then the onset of the COVID-19 pandemic in the United States in March 2020, the majority of advertising on oWOW Radio—locally based restaurants, retailers and concert venues—cancelled their accounts with the station, while oWOW was forced to cancel all upcoming events; due to this, the station announced its pending shutdown in mid-September 2021, effective October 2, 2020. In making the announcement, Gorman stressed that while oWOW Radio enjoyed a significant increase in listenership when the pandemic hit, the loss of advertising made it "a moot point". In a "final listen" to the station for his RadioInsight.com column, Sean Ross mused, "On one hand, the airstaff was part of what made oWow unique. On the other hand, oWow's music is pretty good—I wrote two years ago that Gorman usually made me buy a song if I listened to one of his stations long enough—and... there are certainly FM stations that aren't much more than playlists themselves."

Prior to the announced shutdown date, Gorman announced oWOW Radio's stream would remain operational "... during the month of October or as long as the station can financially and contractually endure" but all local programming would still be dropped. The extension came following feedback from listeners on social media, along with a modest increase in advertising and revenue from an oWOW compilation album that featured locally sourced bands and musical talent. oWOW Radio ended all operations on January 17, 2021, after these funds were exhausted; Gorman noted to The Plain Dealer that he was already in the process of planning out future broadcasting projects with Pappas.
