= WARF =

Sports radio station in Akron, Ohio

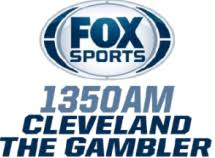
- Akron, Ohio; United States
- Broadcast area: Greater Cleveland; Northeast Ohio
- Frequency: 1350 kHz (HD Radio)
- Branding: Fox Sports 1350 The Gambler

Programming
- Language: English
- Format: Sports radio
- Affiliations: Fox Sports Radio; VSiN; Cleveland Guardians (Spanish); Cleveland State Vikings; Columbus Blue Jackets; Kent State Golden Flashes

Ownership
- Owner: iHeartMedia; (iHM Licenses, LLC)
- Sister stations: WAKS; WGAR-FM; WHLK; WMJI; WMMS; WTAM

History
- Founded: February 22, 1925
- First air date: April 8, 1925
- Former call signs: WADC (1925–1965); WSLR (1965–1994); WTOU (1994–2005)
- Former frequencies: 1160 kHz (1925–1927); 1010 kHz (1927); 1260 kHz (1927–1928); 1320 kHz (1928–1941)
- Call sign meaning: "Akron Radio Free" (former progressive talk branding)

Technical information
- Licensing authority: FCC
- Facility ID: 49951
- Class: B
- Power: 5,000 watts (unlimited)
- Transmitter coordinates: 41°10′5.00″N 81°30′45.00″W

Links
- Public license information: Public file; LMS
- Webcast: Listen live (via iHeartRadio)
- Website: 1350thegambler.iheart.com

WARF (1350 AM) is a commercial radio station licensed to Akron, Ohio, United States, known as "Fox Sports 1350 The Gambler" and carrying a sports format. Owned by iHeartMedia, WARF serves the Greater Cleveland and Akron metro areas as an affiliate of Fox Sports Radio and VSiN. The station also carries play-by-play of Cleveland State Vikings men's basketball, Spanish broadcasts of Cleveland Guardians home games, Kent State Golden Flashes football, men's basketball, and women's basketball, and Columbus Blue Jackets hockey.

Originally WADC, the station is the oldest surviving radio station in Akron, founded and owned by Allen T. Simmons. A charter affiliate of the CBS Radio Network, WADC was a key station in the network up to the early 1960s. Becoming WSLR in 1965, the station became one of the earliest country music stations in the region, and remained as such until switching to urban contemporary as WTOU in 1994. WTOU retained that call sign after becoming an ESPN Radio affiliate in 1999 and a Fox Sports Radio affiliate in 2001, but changed to the current WARF calls in 2005 during a two-year stretch as progressive talk. Having returned to a sports format in 2007, and resuming its Fox Sports affiliation in 2009, WARF was reoriented to the Cleveland media market in 2020 with the addition of VSiN sports betting-related programming.

WARF's studios are located in the Six Six Eight Building in Downtown Cleveland's Gateway District, while the station transmitter resides in Cuyahoga Falls. In addition to a standard analog transmission, WARF broadcasts a digital signal through the HD Radio in-band on-channel standard, and streams online via iHeartRadio.

== Programming ==
=== Regular schedule ===
VSiN programming airs in morning drive (with a show featuring former Cleveland Indians pitcher Jensen Lewis) and during the evening, with programming from Fox Sports Radio airing middays (including Dan Patrick, Colin Cowherd, and Jon "Stugotz" Weiner) as well as overnights/early mornings.

=== Play by play ===
WARF serves as the flagship station for Cleveland State Vikings men's basketball.

== History ==
=== Beginnings ===
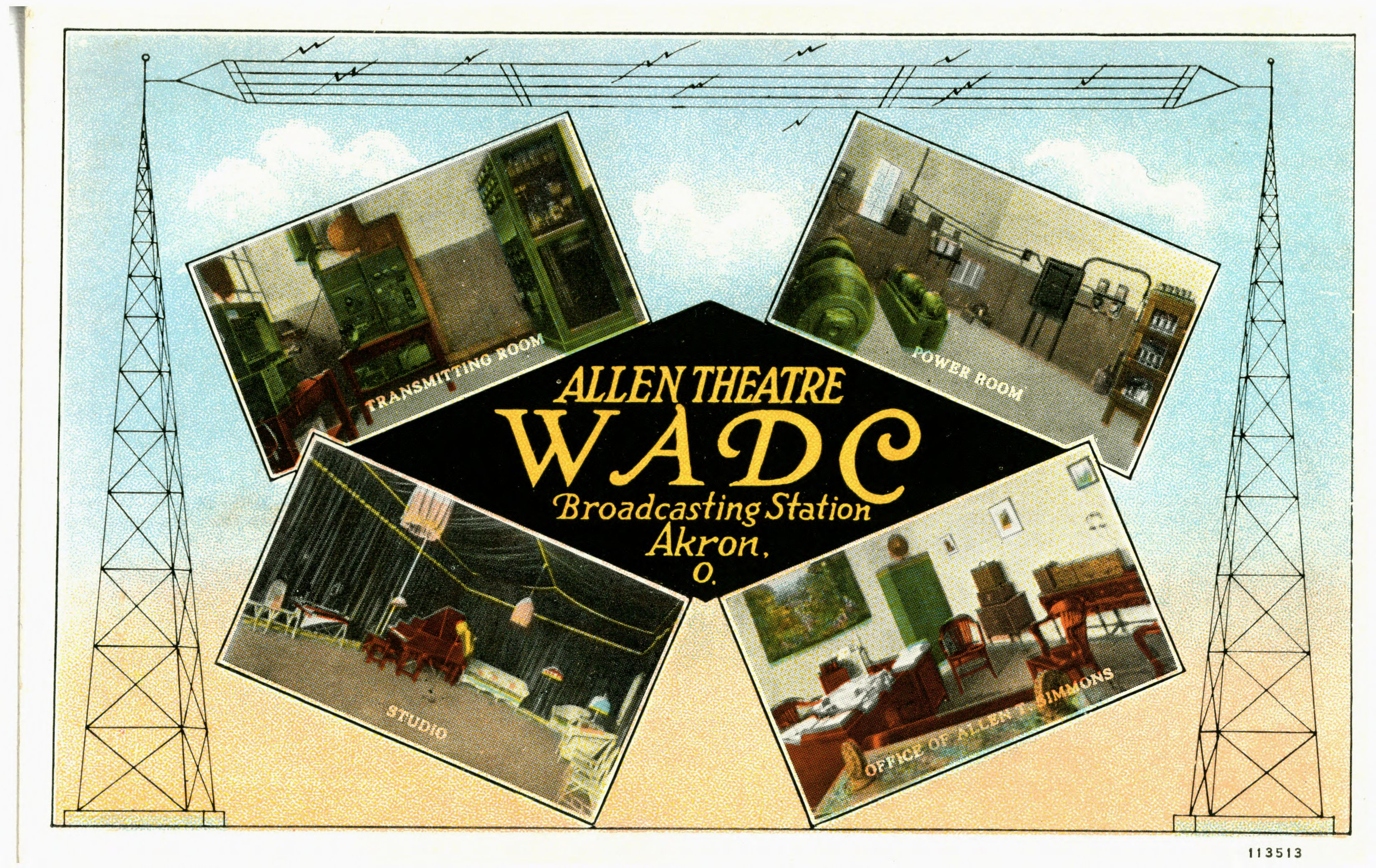
Allen Theatre, Broadcasting Station WADC, Akron, Ohio

The Akron Automobile Association established a temporary station named WADC for a February 1925 auto show at the Central Garage, with a transmitter built by the Willard Storage Battery Co. of Cleveland. W. F. Jones, head of the show's sponsor, the Automobile Dealers' Company, insisted for the station's establishment to help broadcast the show's events to a larger audience. After the show ended, Jones tried to get a permanent station launched; failing to find enough investor support, Allen T. Simmons—owner of the Allen Theater—obtained a permanent license which was granted on March 23, 1925. W. F. Jones would eventually purchase Cleveland station WDBK in July 1927 and moved it to Akron as WFJC, only to have it moved back to Cleveland in 1930 as WGAR (AM) via a two-station consolidation.

A slogan — "Watch Akron Develop Commerce" — matching the call letters was adopted, which was soon slightly modified to "Watch Akron Develop Commercially". (Allen's 1965 obituary stated that the station's slogan was "Watch Akron Deliver Cars", although an Akron Beacon columnist later noted that "Several readers... reported that it actually meant 'Watch Akron Develop Commercially'".) WADC was the second radio station in Akron (after WOE which went on the air on April 27, 1922, but was off the air in July 1923). Regular broadcasts began on April 8, 1925, from studios in the Portage Hotel. The station originally broadcast over 1160 kHz with 100 watts, but its signal increased to 500 watts by 1926.

WADC was a charter member of the CBS Radio Network, being one of the 16 stations that aired the first CBS network program on September 18, 1927. The station soon opened new studios in Tallmadge and increased its power to 5,000 watts. Its frequency jumped around from 1160 to 1010 to 1260, and to 1320 after the FRC's General Order 40 went into effect on November 11, 1928. On March 29, 1941, it moved to 1350 kHz as part of the NARBA frequency shifts.

As the CBS affiliate during the 1930s and 1940s, WADC was the leading Akron radio station, rivaled later only by WAKR after it took to the air in 1940. Akron had no NBC Red affiliate, since WTAM's signal from Cleveland covered the area. WADC's success was symbolized by the two-story art-deco WADC Building, which was completed on May 6, 1949, and became a local landmark on the southeast corner of Main and Mill Streets in downtown Akron. The entire second floor of the building was occupied by the station's studios and offices.

=== "Whistler" 1350 ===
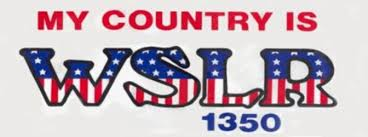
Logo used during the "Whistler 1350" era

WADC was sold in late 1964 to Welcome Radio, Inc. headed by Cleveland lawyer Harrison Fuerst. In January 1965, the station became WSLR, known as "Whistler 1350". It brought a country music format to the area, with morning host Jaybird Drennan. Jaybird died on December 10, 2006. On August 22, 1984, Welcome Radio sold WSLR to OBC Broadcasting, Inc., headed by Richard A. Nicoletti. Faced with competition from WQMX in Akron, along with WGAR-FM in Cleveland and WQXK in Youngstown, WSLR dropped its country format.

=== Post "Whistler" ===
On September 1, 1994, the station adopted an urban contemporary format delivered by ABC Radio called "The Touch", and it switched callsigns to WTOU on September 29.

In October 1999, the station switched to a sports talk format. It first carried programming from ESPN Radio and kept the WTOU calls but dropped "The Touch" nickname and instead went by "1350AM ESPN - Akron's Sports Network". WTOU and sister station WKDD (96.5 FM) were sold by OBC Broadcasting to Clear Channel Communications (now iHeartMedia) on August 15, 2000. On September 18, 2001, months after the sale to Clear Channel, WTOU then flipped to Fox Sports Radio, branded as "Fox Sports 1350". The networks' offerings at the time also included Tony Bruno and "Kiley & Booms", co-hosted by Cleveland Heights native Chuck Booms (who broadcast on his end from Clear Channel's Cleveland facilities in Independence, Ohio). WTOU also became the Akron-Canton affiliate for The Jim Rome Show, and became the home station for the Akron Aeros for the 2002 season.

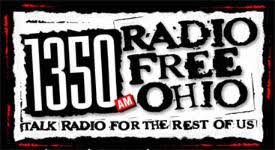
WARF logo from 2005 to 2007, used during its time as a progressive talk station. The former "Radio Free" slogan is the origin of the station's call letters.

The sports talk format was dropped on June 2, 2005, and the station switched to a liberal talk radio format (albeit with no Air America programming at first), changing its call letters to WARF. Branded as "Radio Free Ohio", WARF carried Al Franken and Randi Rhodes from Air America Radio, and Ed Schultz and Stephanie Miller from Jones Radio. WARF also held the distinction of being the only station in the country to carry Bill Press's radio show when it debuted on June 27, 2005, until KRXA picked up the show on August 22. On February 13, 2006, veteran radio personality Joe Finan (long heard on rival talk station WNIR) began a locally produced talk show 11:00 a.m. to 1:00 p.m. weekdays. Finan was released from WARF that October 27, and died that December 20.

WARF changed back to a sports format on March 30, 2007; branded "Sports Radio 1350", becoming an affiliate for Sporting News Radio. Its logo used a blue-and-gold color scheme, a nod to the University of Akron. In June 2009, WARF reverted back to Fox Sports Radio programming.

=== Shifting focus to Cleveland ===
On January 27, 2020, WARF rebranded as "Fox Sports 1350 The Gambler", as it added programming from the Vegas Stats & Information Network (VSiN) related to sports betting. The accompanying press release also formally repositioned WARF as a Cleveland market station, billing itself as Cleveland's Fox Sports 1350, though the station's city of license assignment to Akron and transmitter site in Cuyahoga Falls remained unchanged.

On March 21, 2021, WARF announced plans to move to a new combined studio/office facility at the Six Six Eight Building in Downtown Cleveland, utilizing cloud storage technology. The relocation process completed in July 2022.

On December 1, 2025, WARF began to carry more VSiN programming during the day, with Fox Sports programming airing middays and overnights/early mornings. The entirety of the Fox Sports lineup now airs sister station WMMS-HD2 100.7/W256BT FM 99.1, broadcasting under the "Sports Radio 99.1" banner.

Though primarily an English language station, WARF serves as the Spanish flagship station for the Cleveland Guardians, airing broadcasts of home games, complimenting the coverage on sister stations/Guardians flagships WTAM and WMMS 100.7 FM.

In 2025, WARF became the flagship for Kent State Golden Flashes football, men's basketball, and women's basketball.

Also in 2025, WARF became the Cleveland affiliate for Columbus Blue Jackets hockey.
