= WAKR =

Radio station in Akron, Ohio

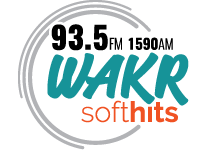
- Akron, Ohio; United States
- Broadcast area: Akron metro area
- Frequency: 1590 kHz
- Branding: 93.5 1590 WAKR

Programming
- Language: English
- Format: Full-service radio; Classic hits
- Affiliations: ABC News Radio

Ownership
- Owner: Rubber City Radio Group, Inc.
- Sister stations: WNWV; WONE-FM; WQMX

History
- First air date: October 16, 1940
- Former frequencies: 1530 kHz (1940–1941)
- Call sign meaning: "Akron"

Technical information
- Licensing authority: FCC
- Facility ID: 43871
- Class: B
- Power: 5,000 watts
- Transmitter coordinates: 41°1′14″N 81°30′20″W
- Translator: 93.5 W228EL (Akron)

Links
- Public license information: Public file; LMS
- Webcast: Listen live; Listen live (via TuneIn)
- Website: wakr.net

WAKR (1590 AM, "Soft Hits 93.5 FM") is a commercial radio station licensed to Akron, Ohio, United States, serving the Akron metropolitan area including Summit and Portage County. Owned by Rubber City Radio Group, Inc., the station features a full-service and classic hits format. WAKR's studios are located in Akron's Wallhaven neighborhood, while the transmitter is sited in the city's southeast side. In addition to a standard analog transmission, WAKR is relayed over low-power Akron translator W228EL (93.5 FM) and available online.

Neither the first or oldest surviving radio station in Akron, (Note: Those distinctions belong to WOE and WADC, the latter now known as WARF, respectively.) WAKR has had the most measured historical impact of any broadcast outlet in the city, especially during its first 50 years. WAKR was signed on by electronics dealer, lawyer, and inventor S. Bernard Berk on October 16, 1940, after a three-year application process and protests from two competing radio stations. An affiliate of Blue Network/ABC Radio with substantial local programming, WAKR's ratings dominated the market in the 1940s and 1950s, frequently outperforming Blue/ABC affiliates across the country. Regarded as a "talent school", WAKR employed multiple announcers who found greater success elsewhere, with Alan Freed, Scott Muni and Art Fleming the most famous of alumni. Freed's 1950 departure and attempted move to crosstown WADC, which Berk successfully blocked in court, was the first successful usage of the non-compete clause in the broadcast industry. Berk applied for a television license before a regulatory freeze placed what became WAKR-TV on the UHF band, with WAKR's profits frequently sustaining the TV station. The Knight Newspapers chain, publishers of the Akron Beacon Journal, held a minority stake in Berk's Summit Radio (d/b/a Group One Broadcasting) for nearly 30 years.

The station, and FM adjunct WONE-FM, remained in the hands of the Berk family until 1986, when it was sold to DKM Broadcasting; DKM merged into cable system operator Summit Communications Group the following year. By 1990, U.S. Radio, a Black-operated company headed by Ragan Henry, purchased WAKR and WONE-FM. Despite the continued popularity of top-rated morning show hosts Adam Jones and Bob Allen, WAKR's dominance gradually eroded throughout the 1980s due to stiffer competition from FM stations and staffing cutbacks, and resulted in a format switch to talk radio by May 1991. Rubber City Radio Group, organized by WQMX owner Thom Mandel, acquired both stations in 1993 and has owned all three into the present day.

WAKR's format has changed multiple times under Rubber City ownership, beginning with a switch to adult standards in 1994, a second iteration of talk radio in 1997, and a return to standards in 1999 but largely sourced from Westwood One's "AM Only" satellite service. The station segued to oldies in 2006, again to talk radio in 2014, and to classic hits in 2020. In addition to carrying local news reports and top-of-the-hour newscasts from ABC News Radio, WAKR is the Akron affiliate for the Cleveland Browns and Cleveland Guardians radio networks, as well as the Ohio State Sports Network.

== History ==
=== A third voice for Akron ===
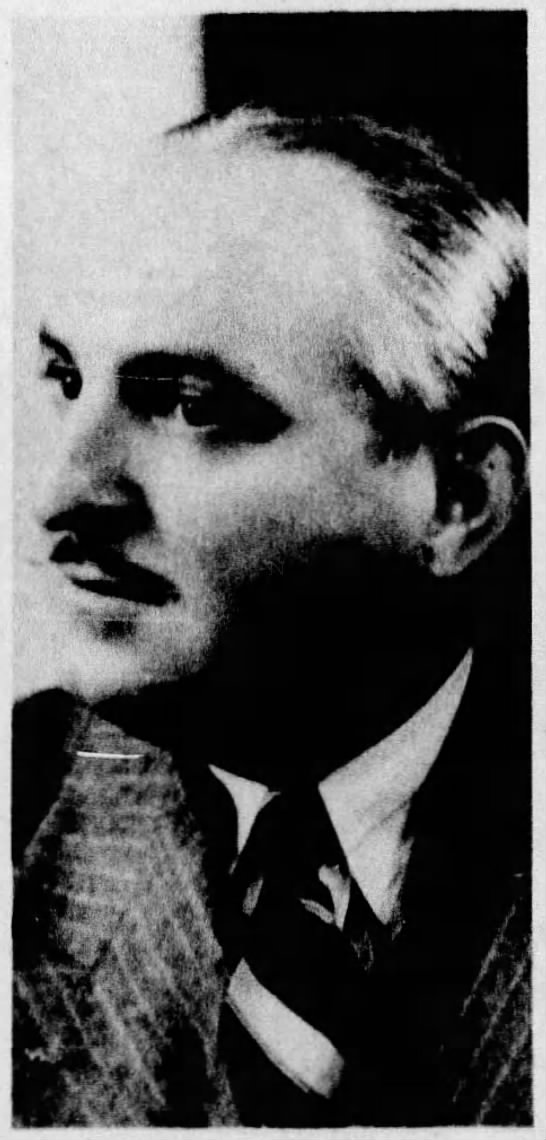
S. Bernard Berk

S. Bernard Berk, a practicing attorney and electrical appliance store operator in Akron, first filed paperwork with the Federal Communications Commission (FCC) on January 6, 1937, to establish a third radio station for the city, after WADC and WJW (1210 AM); WTAM in Cleveland also serviced Akron with its transmitter site in Brecksville, 20 miles (32 km) north of the city. In addition to his law practice and business, Berk also had experience as an inventor. He held a patent for an early photoelectric cell that automatically dimmed automobile headlights for oncoming traffic at night, and also designed a five-speaker public address system for Western Electric.

Akron Beacon Journal publisher John S. Knight publicly showed skepticism in his column that the commission would even grant the permit, and could not justify the need for a third station. Both WJW and WADC objected to the establishment of another radio station in Akron, as did KXBY in Kansas City, Missouri; despite those objections, John T. Brambill, an FCC examiner, recommended that the permit be granted. The FCC, however, reversed that examiner's ruling on May 11, 1938, citing that there was "no lack of radio broadcast facilities and service in Akron, Ohio" and that Berk's party did not propose "a program of research and experimentation" to the development of high-fidelity broadcasting. Berk appealed the decision, claiming that the commission ignored testimony from Akron officials and leaders desiring a third station, and after securing statements of support from 34 different civic, religious and community organizations in the city, the FCC reversed itself on August 8, 1939, granting the permit.

Washington insiders don't give interested Akronites much chance of being granted a license for a third radio station in the rubber city ... I can't say we need it ...

— John S. Knight, in his Editor's Notebook column for the Akron Beacon Journal, July 22, 1937

WJW and WADC filed protests against the ruling and requested a rehearing, along with two other stations that operated on the proposed 1530 kHz frequency: KITE (the former KXBY) and WBRY in Waterbury, Connecticut. (Note: Both KITE and WBRY were originally two of four experimental high-fidelity AM stations that launched in 1934, along with W2XR in New York City and W6XAI in Bakersfield, California.) KITE and WBRY objected on engineering grounds and would later withdraw their protests, while WJW and WADC objected on economic grounds. At a final review set forth by the commission on October 25, 1939, WJW's counsel stated that the station either made profits of less than $900 a year or had been operating at a loss since 1936, having paid out most of their income on employee salaries. (Note: After WAKR's launch and a subsequent sale of the station, WJW moved out of Akron and into the Cleveland market in November 1943.) After the proceedings, sources close to the FCC told the Beacon Journal that the commission had been changing its focus to awarding permits unless there was an engineering issue and was no longer taking economic arguments into account.

Following this final review, Berk was awarded federal authorization to construct WAKR on January 10, 1940, under his family-owned business Summit Radio Corp. Studios were set up on the ground floor of the First Central Tower in downtown Akron—now known as the Huntington Tower—and WAKR signed up to be an affiliate of NBC's Blue Network and Thesaurus radio transcription service upon launch. Due to WAKR's frequency having been recently included for use for broadcast purposes, Berk's radio appliance store offered free of charge to change the tuning devices on any radios that did not go up to 1530 kHz. After being formally granted the license on October 16, 1940, WAKR took to the air that evening with a grand opening ceremony emceed by Milton Cross, host of the NBC Blue game show Information Please, along with NBC Blue's Metropolitan Opera radio broadcasts.

Initially on 1530 kHz with 1,000 watts, WAKR was moved to 1590 kHz on March 28, 1941, as a result of the North American Regional Broadcasting Agreement, and had power output raised to 5,000 watts the following December. S. Bernard Berk's son, Roger G. Berk, had his first job in the medium digging post holes at WAKR's transmitter site in the city's southeast side; the site remains in active use today.

=== Market dominance ===
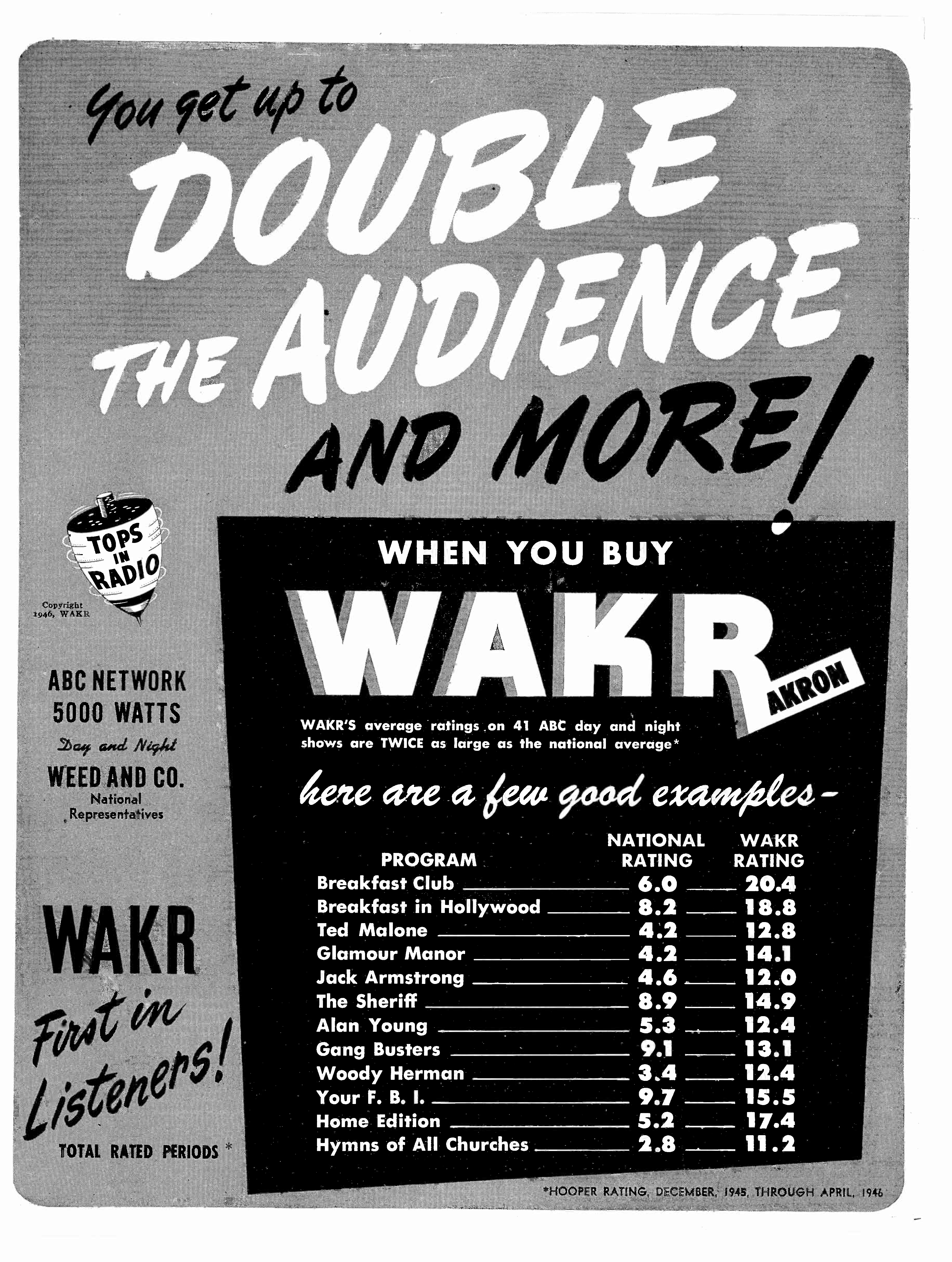
One of several industry trade magazine advertisements taken out by WAKR in the mid-1940s promoting their ratings dominance, this listed WAKR's ratings for ABC Radio programs compared to other affiliates

We had to send an engineer out with a reporter... they radioed it in (using cumbersome two-way radios strapped to their backs) and we would record it on discs. We didn't have tapes or wires; we actually put it on wax.

— Roger G. Berk, on WAKR's methods for filing news reports in the 1940s

While WADC had an advantage of being a CBS Radio Network affiliate, WAKR built its reputation primarily through local programming alongside NBC Blue (renamed the Blue Network in 1943, then again as ABC Radio in 1945) offerings. WAKR has been often regarded as being one of the first radio stations in the United States to have established an active news department when it signed on, augmenting coverage from United Press and the Associated Press. During WAKR's peak in the mid-1940s, C. E. Hooper ratings showed the station with as much as 55 percent of the Akron audience in mornings and 30 percent of the audience in afternoons; even local ratings for Don McNeill's Breakfast Club outperformed comparable ABC Radio affiliates by significant margins. WAKR took out multiple full-page advertisements in Broadcasting throughout 1945 and 1946 boasting of their ratings dominance, calling themselves "Tops in Akron" (also a play on the 1590 kHz frequency being at the "top" of the medium wave band).

Along with the highly rated weekday programming, WAKR also offered multiple specialty programs. One of the longer running programs was the children-oriented Tip Top Tales, hosted by librarian Harriet Leaf, which aired from 1940 to 1957. A local version of the Blue/ABC program America's Town Meeting of the Air ran on WAKR that was aimed at the teenage and young adult audience, championed by S. Bernard Berk's wife, Viola Berk. Starting on January 13, 1945, WAKR broadcast weekly productions from Kent State University's Radio Workshop on Saturday mornings; this continued until 1950 when the university established WKSU-FM.

=== The "WAKR Talent School" ===
Throughout the 1940s and 1950s, WAKR became famous in the industry as being a "stepping stone" for up-and-coming announcers, actors, and television presenters, in what would be informally known as the "WAKR Talent School" under S. Bernard Berk's guidance. Future Peter Gunn co-star Lola Albright joined WAKR after graduating from high school as a receptionist before finding additional work at WTAM in Cleveland. Peter Hackes worked as a newsman at WAKR in the late 1940s before going to CBS News and NBC News, later making notable cameos in the films Broadcast News and True Colors.

He plans to do free lance TV work in the big city and don't be surprised if you see his face on some network video programs.

— Art Cullison, on Art Fazzin leaving WAKR in 1952

Shortly after signing on, the station hired a young announcer named Stephen Richards, who did announcing, acting, and engineering work, and broke the news of the Attack on Pearl Harbor on-air. After leaving WAKR for a brief stint at WJW, Richards starred in the Weathervane Playhouse stage production Yes and No before moving to Los Angeles, a chance meeting with two Hollywood press agents prompted him to go to the Warner Bros. Burbank studios. A 1944 promotional booklet issued by the studio promoting new talent signings said of Richards, "Walked into Warner Brothers studio. Asked for a job. Got it." Assuming the stage name Mark Stevens, his first theatrical appearance was a bit role in Passage to Marseille, and went to appear in over eighty feature films and forty different television programs.

Art Fazzin was hired as Top O' the Morning host in January 1949, having worked previously at radio stations in North Carolina. In addition to mornings, Fazzin provided color commentary for Akron Zips football games, announced Soap Box Derby finals for the station, and hosted various other daytime programs. Fazzin left the station on January 11, 1952, to pursue freelance work in New York City, leading Beacon Journal writer Art Cullison to predict, "don't be surprised if you see his face on some network video programs." Using his middle name for the stage name Art Fleming, Fazzin became best known as the first host of the television game show Jeopardy!

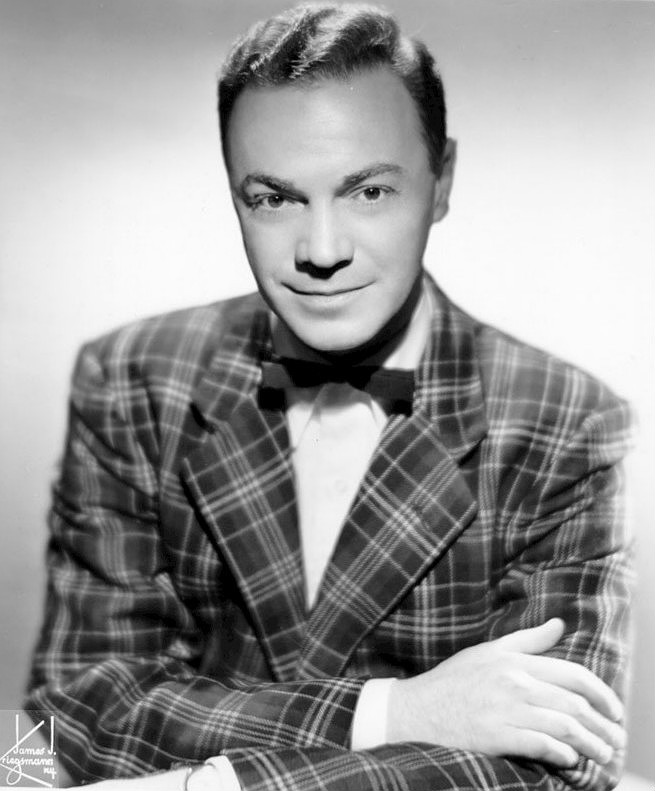
Alan Freed

Perhaps WAKR's most famous personality in this era was Alan Freed, who joined WAKR in June 1945 at the age of 23 after previous work in Youngstown and New Castle, Pennsylvania. Known on-air as "The Old Knuclehead", Freed quickly became a local favorite at the station, hosting a nightly popular music program, Request Review, and an afternoon program, Jukebox Serenade. Freed also hosted a daytime program aimed at the bobby soxer audience early on at WAKR; when that was dropped from the lineup, the station added an evening show hosted by Freed titled Wax Works. The station also launched a phone participation contest program hosted by Freed in 1948, entitled Hello, Cinderella. After an ABC Radio program hosted by Paul Whiteman was cancelled, WAKR declined to pick up a replacement program offered by ABC and Freed's daytime show was reinstated, giving him over five hours of airtime every day. Even with his popularity, Freed was reportedly fired temporarily in 1948 for violating studio rules, (Note: An Akron Beacon Journal column on February 8, 1948, responding to reader inquiries about his status confirms this temporary firing with the terse reply: "He doesn't work here (at WAKR) anymore.") later accounts suggested it was due to his failure to show up for several days in a row.

Many a Hollywood star would envy (Alan Freed's) fan mail... which averages about 500 letters and postcards a day... plus telegrams and special delivery epistles... A well-meaning mother was having trouble getting her baby to sleep... so she called WAKR to have Alan sing a lullaby... Result! Freed did... but the baby didn't.

— Bee Offineer

When Freed left the station on February 12, 1950, he attempted to resurface at WADC several days later on a program sponsored by an area record store. After one show, Berk sued Freed to enforce a non-compete clause preventing him from working at any station within a radius of 75 miles (121 km) from Akron for a full year. This clause was included in a contract Freed signed in 1948, at the height of his popularity at WAKR, and has been used as a model for broadcasters ever since. After exhausting his legal appeals and on the brink of financial ruin, Freed surfaced for a brief time at WXEL (channel 9), then joined WJW (850 AM) in Cleveland after the non-compete finally ended; it is at WJW where he made history coining the phrase "Rock and Roll" for rhythm and blues recordings played on his program, and where he presided over the Moondog Coronation Ball, a landmark popular music event.

WAKR hired Scott Muni from WSMB—New Orleans in early November 1956 as the station's overnight host; he would be promoted to host Request Review, the evening program that Freed once dominated, on July 8, 1957. Along with his on-air work, Muni served as the station's music director, despite no formal training in the profession, he used music trends in trade publications and sought feedback from teenage sock hops he would emcee. Just before leaving the station for WMCA in New York City in May 1958, Muni was honored by the Akron Junior Chamber of Commerce as "Man of the Month" for hosting a sock hop that benefited a local children's home. In late 1959, Muni would find himself the subject of unwanted attention when he was questioned by a congressional investigation into payola, the same investigation that enveloped Freed's career and resulted in his shows at WNEW-TV and WABC (770 AM) being cancelled. Muni, however, is perhaps best known for his long run as a pioneering progressive rock air personality at WNEW-FM.

From mid-1956 to 1960, Charlie Greer—nicknamed "The Skinny Boy"—hosted WAKR's Top O' the Morning program, later re-titled Happy Music. Greer also famously emceed a "Miss Downtown Akron" beauty pageant on a day in 1959 when multiple buildings in downtown Akron were demolished. Greer left the station in November 1960 to join WABC upon that station's conversion to a Top 40 format, teaming up with former WAKR colleague Scott Muni in the process as part of WABC's "Swingin' Seven at 77". When reporting about Greer's departure from the station and noting the alumni that already had preceded him, Akron Beacon Journal writer Dick Shippy commented, "...whoever does the picking at WAKR must have the right formula." Jack Ryan also made his debut at WAKR in June 1956 as the late-morning host; unlike Muni and Greer, Ryan remained at the station in that time slot until retiring at the end of 1986.

=== Enter Knight, FM and TV ===
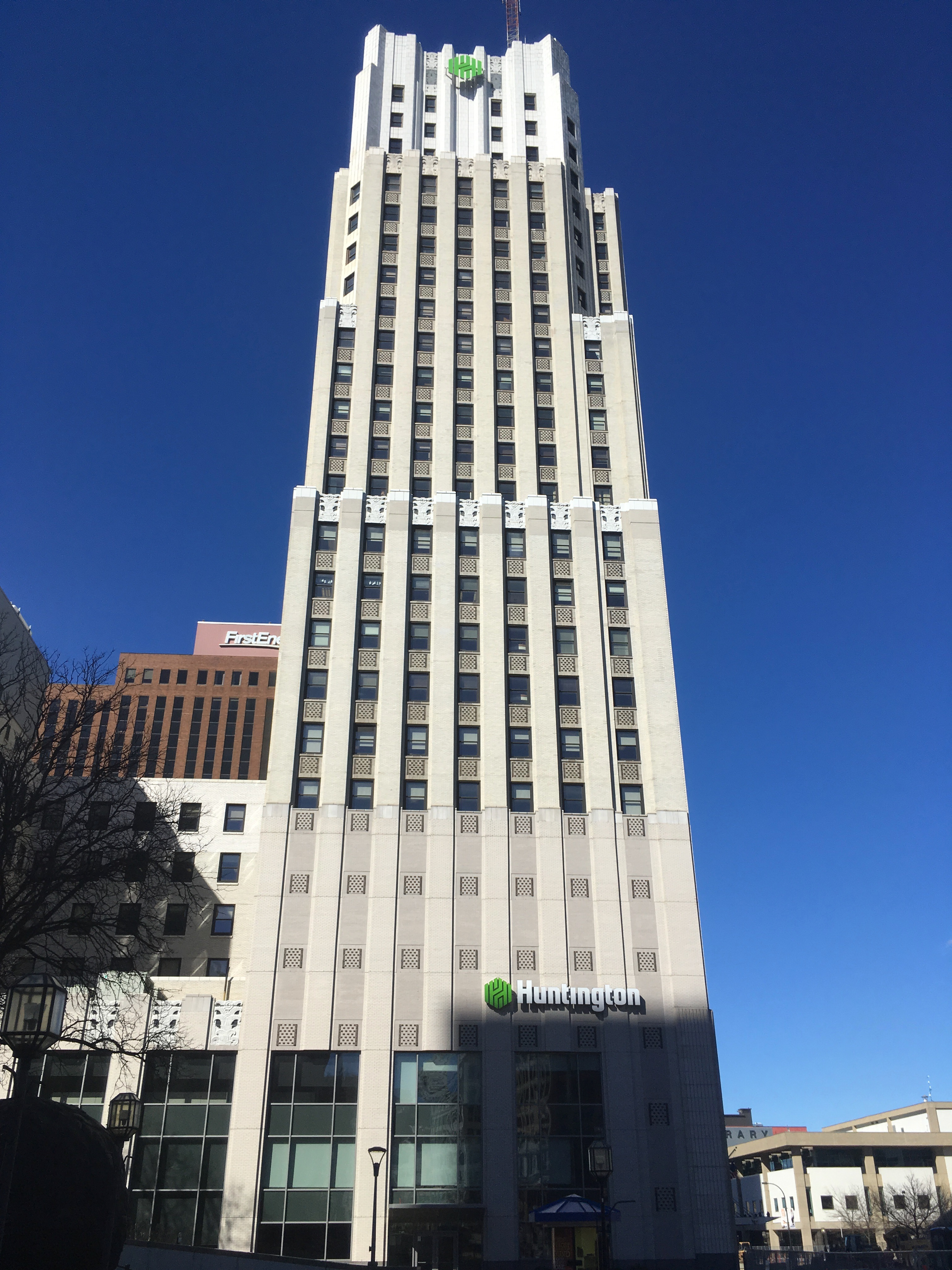
The First Central Tower, now the Huntington Tower, was WAKR's first studio home; a 120 foot (37 m) tall transmitter mast once used by WAKR-FM and WAKR-TV remained on top of the building until July 9, 2019.

In April 1946, Akron Beacon Journal publisher John S. Knight, who had been previously critical of the efforts to establish WAKR, purchased a 45 percent interest of Summit Radio Corp. for an undisclosed amount; no changes in management or operations came with this transaction. Knight's stock acquisition came after purchasing ownership stakes in both Miami's WQAM and Chicago's WIND, as his fledgling newspaper chain owned both the Miami Herald and Chicago Daily News, respectively. Despite remaining separate entities, WAKR and the Beacon Journal would often share news resources and cross-promote each other for the next 30 years. An FM adjunct, WAKR-FM (97.5), commenced regular operations on October 12, 1947; with its transmitter located on top of the First Central Tower, it was the first FM station licensed to the city of Akron. J.N. Bailey, executive director of the FM Association, a non-profit trade organization of FM broadcasters and enthusiasts, notably predicted at a WAKR-FM sponsored function of radio store owners that a network composed solely of FM stations having complete coverage throughout the contiguous United States could be established as early as 1948.

As WAKR-FM was being established, Summit Radio Corp. and WADC filed competing applications for the lone television channel assigned to Akron, originally intended as a VHF license on channel 11. The applications were filed at the same time WEWS-TV commenced operations as the first television station in Ohio. Both applications remained under review and went before a commission hearing on July 15, 1948, and WAKR had gone so far as to make a purchase order for VHF transmitting equipment from RCA, before the FCC implemented a freeze on any additional television licenses that September 30, while it studied the possibility of adding additional channels via the UHF band. When the freeze was lifted, the FCC's Sixth Report and Order reassigned the proposed Akron license as one of two potential UHF signals for the market. Summit Radio won the license for WAKR-TV on channel 49 by September 4, 1952; a coin flip determined the winning bid between Summit and WADC, as the other frequency available, channel 65, was not considered operable at the time. While initially based at the First Central Tower, and with a UHF mast affixed to the top of the building, WAKR, WAKR-FM and WAKR-TV moved the following year to new studios at the former Copley Theatre, which only had existed as a theater between March 1947 and October 1952.

Even though the job of a TV journalist has many repetitive actions, the substance of the job, the news, almost never repeats itself. This is something I discovered during my first serious job when I worked at WAKR TV and Radio in Akron. I spent three years there and loved the fact that the sense of discovery with my job changed every day as the news would change.

— Ted Henry

From the start, WAKR personalities also appeared on WAKR-TV; including Jack Fitzgibbons, Bill Murphy and Bob Wylie. Scott Muni hosted a nightly weather segment on the TV station at 6:55 pm, directly leading in to his nightly Top 40 program on WAKR, and also hosted The Hop, a local music and dance program. Charlie Greer also hosted a limited-run dance program devoted to big band music over WAKR-TV in 1958. Muni and Greer's former colleague Jack Ryan would later serve as the lead weatherman for WAKR-TV's evening newscasts throughout the 1960s, 1970s and early 1980s. Ted Henry began his career as a reporter for WAKR and WAKR-TV in 1965. Sports coverage on WAKR would also find itself shown on WAKR-TV; this included Akron Zips football and basketball broadcasts, Wylie in particular soon became known as the "Voice of the Zips". WAKR-TV also touted itself as having broken news of the armistice agreement which formally suspended the Korean War well before any of the Cleveland market stations reported the news.

Despite the touting of UHF signals as not being any different from VHF signals in a technical sense, along with optimistic words from S. Bernard Berk at launch that "about 99-44/100% of the Akron area will receive (WAKR-TV) without difficulty", the station immediately ran into issues with poor reception, transmission issues relating to inclement weather conditions, and a lack of adequate UHF channel tuners. Even with passage of the All-Channel Receiver Act, these problems which would not be totally resolved until Summit Radio successfully petitioned the FCC to amend channel allocations between Canton and Akron, allowing WAKR-TV to move to a reassigned channel 23 allocation at higher power, the change took place on December 1, 1967. WAKR-TV amassed a "seven figure" operating deficit from 1953 until the move to channel 23 and lost significant amounts of money for the majority of its existence; Summit Radio relied on profits from WAKR to keep the TV station solvent.

WAKR-TV became an ABC-TV affiliate when they signed on, owing to WAKR's existing ABC affiliation; Berk attributed the recent merger with United Paramount Theaters to create American Broadcasting-Paramount Theatres as a determining factor for the affiliation. This competitive advantage would soon end, however, after WEWS became the ABC-TV affiliate for the Cleveland market. While WEWS had the larger audience by a commanding margin, both stations would fight for each other's viewership for the next four decades.

=== Grouped as ONE ===
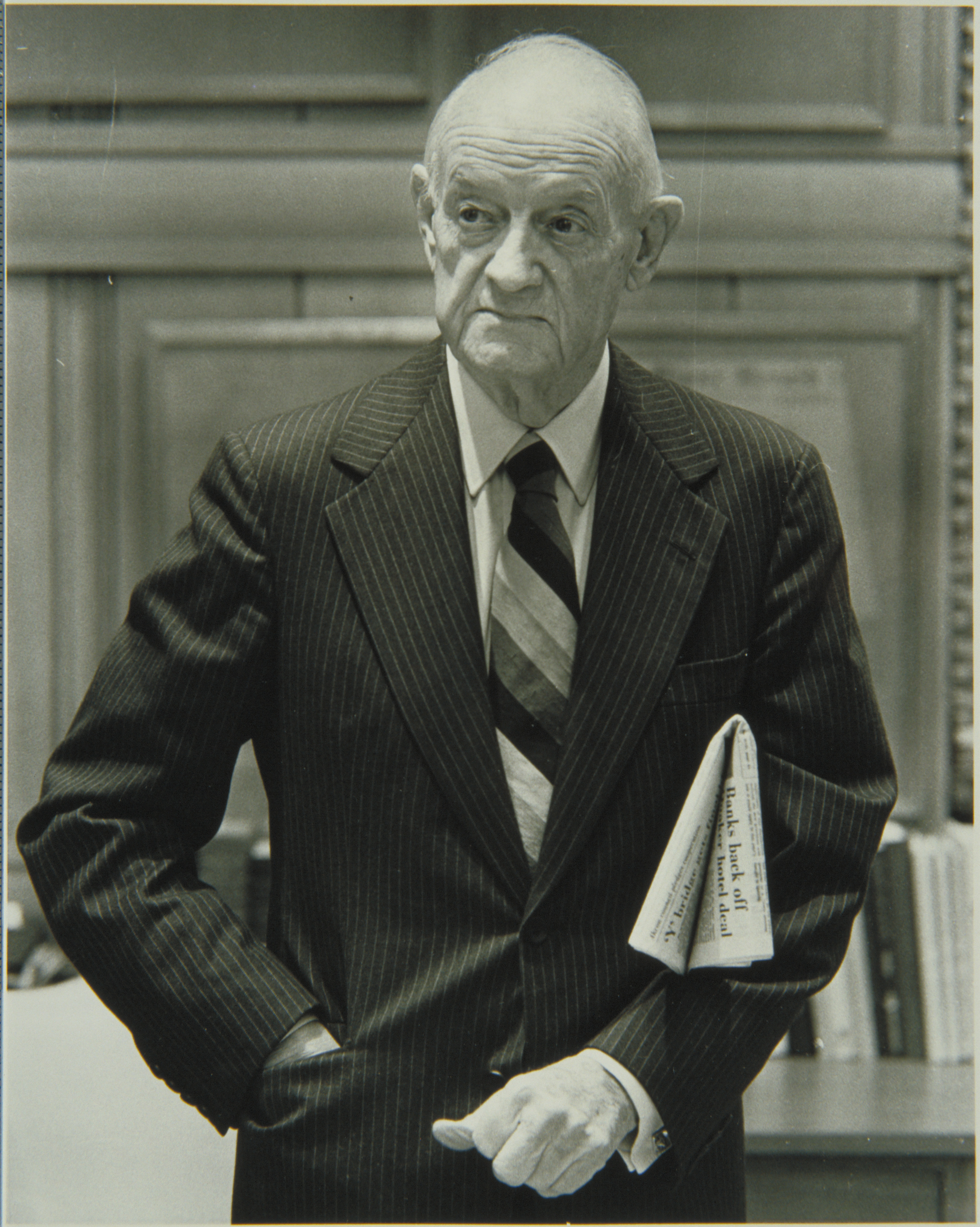
John S. Knight

The Berk family's broadcasting interests expanded when they purchased WONE (980 AM) and WONE-FM (104.7) in Dayton from Brush-Moore Newspapers for $1.5 million in 1964. Both WONE and WONE-FM were assigned under a new subsidiary, Group One Broadcasting, when the deal closed. While WAKR, WAKR-FM and WAKR-TV officially remained under Summit Radio control, Summit owned all of Group One's stock, and all three stations would formally be promoted as "Group ONE" stations in advertisements and were regarded as being a part of the chain in station profiles. Under the Group One name, the Berk family purchased KBOX and KBOX-FM in Dallas for over $1.2 million in 1967. Following founder S. Bernard Berk's death at age 69 on July 11, 1966, his widow Viola Berk took over Summit/Group One operations, ultimately handing them over in 1970 to WAKR's vice president and general manager Roger G. Berk, who also had been heavily involved with WAKR-FM and WAKR-TV's establishments. The surviving members of the Berk family also established a memorial college scholarship in S. Bernard Berk's name.

John S. Knight and Roger G. Berk began talks of merging Summit/Group One and Knight Newspapers in late 1967, at a potential value of $6.6 million. To further enable the transaction, Knight Newspapers divested themselves of any associations in Scripps Howard properties, this included Knight re-purchasing Scripps Howard's 25 percent minority stake in the Akron Beacon Journal. By April 1968, the merger talks evolved into Knight buying out the remaining 55 percent of Summit/Group One stock held by the Berk family, with Roger G. Berk being retained as manager for the group's stations in Dallas and Dayton, while Berk continued to lobby extensively to have a larger role within Knight Newspapers.

(Roger G.) Berk wants to be Vice President-Broadcasting. The reason? Status! This is terribly important to him and you must know the man to understand his attitude. As I read it, Berk fears being 'shunted aside.' He craves recognition, doesn't want to be known forever as 'the man from WAKR.' More on this later.

— John S. Knight, from a confidential memo during negotiations over a proposed Knight Newspapers-Summit Radio merger

The merger talks ultimately reached an impasse and collapsed by December 1968; less than a year later, Knight Newspapers purchased The Philadelphia Inquirer and Daily News from Triangle Publications; notably excluded from the purchase were WFIL, WFIL-FM and WFIL-TV. In 1977, three years after Knight merged his newspaper holdings into Ridder Publications, Inc. to form Knight Ridder, the company divested itself of the minority stake in Summit/Group One, valued at $3.3 million; Berk later said of Knight's divestment, "nobody wanted to own a minority share of a family company." Despite the failure to merge with Knight Newspapers, Summit/Group One would make one additional purchase: KLZ and KLZ-FM in Denver from Time-Life Broadcasting for $2.75 million on February 12, 1972.

Locally, WAKR-FM had entered into separate programming with an easy listening format in the late 1960s; a power upgrade and placement on WAKR-TV's new tower in November 1967 was concurrent with adding coverage of Kent State Golden Flashes basketball games. The FM station also began broadcasting in quadraphonic stereo in 1972. Even with all of those changes, the call sign was changed to WAEZ on July 9, 1973, to establish a distinct identity for it, compared to WAKR and WAKR-TV. Summit/Group One vice president Alfred G. Grosby expressed regret that it did not occur sooner, as the FM station was already boasting a strong audience and advertiser base, WAEZ was chosen by the staff after analyzing a computer query of all available call signs.

=== Consistency at 1590 ===
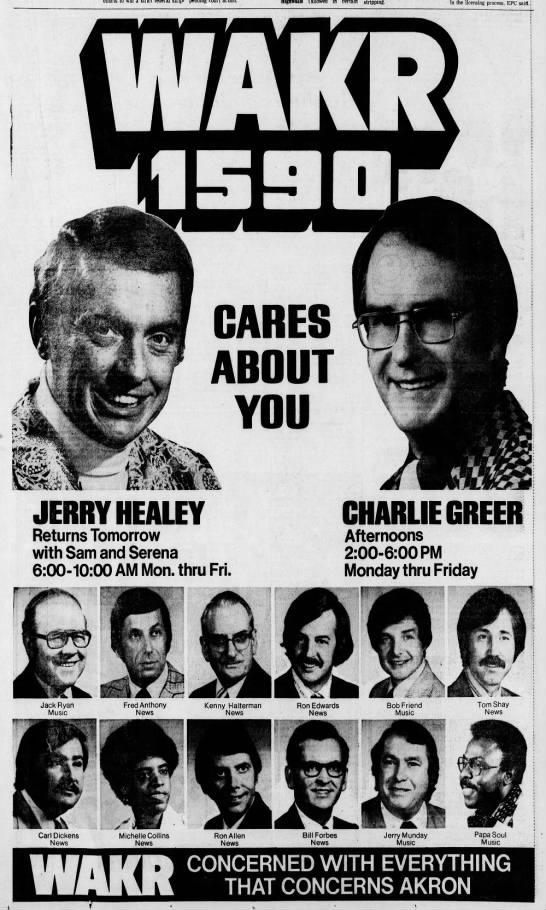
Newspaper ad promoting Jerry Healey's March 1976 return to WAKR; also featuring much of the station's news personnel and air staff.

WAKR's music focus evolved throughout the 1960s, 1970s and 1980s, becoming full-service adult contemporary centered around local personality and extensive sports coverage. News reporter Kenny Halterman worked at WAKR from 1961 until his retirement in 1982, Halterman also moonlit as an instructor at Kent State University and filed reports for WAKR-TV. Halterman was part of a news department for a radio station that, at its peak in the 1970s, employed 12 full-time reporters.

Jerry Healey joined the station in August 1967 calling games for the Akron Vulcans during their lone season in the Continental Football League; then became morning host and sports director that September, delivering sports updates on his show with Bickersons-style alter egos "Sam and Serena", and was the lead play-by-play voice for Akron Zips football and basketball. Healey became the first president of the Akron Press Club upon its 1971 formation and hosted a daily half-hour variety show over WAKR-TV. He left WAKR in November 1973 to focus on broadcast productions and sports commentary, notably developing and holding a patent for "Quickie Golf", but returned in March 1976. Healey was reputedly one of the first people in radio to use the "TGIF" initialism for the phrase "Thank God It's Friday", which was also used as a title for a WAKR-TV program, TGIF Party, in 1974. Healey left the station again on March 24, 1977, the result of a contract dispute.

Meanwhile, after having left for New York City in 1960, Charlie Greer returned to WAKR on July 2, 1973, as afternoon drive host, he then took over as morning show host after Healey's first departure. Greer resumed work in afternoons when Healey returned, remaining in that timeslot until leaving in September 1980. Charlie Greer's replacement in afternoon drive, Bill Hart, was also named as program director.

Many times we would get off the air and be exhausted from laughing so much. I remember saying, "You know, Bob (Allen), these are the good old days." And they were.

— Adam Jones

The station hired the duo of Adam Jones (Robert Ocepek) and Bob Allen (Gorden Van Waes) for morning drive on August 21, 1978, after previous work at WQUA in Moline, Illinois and WPTF in Raleigh, North Carolina. As part of a viral marketing campaign, Jones and Allen went around the city wearing t-shirts emblazoned "Adam and Bob", handing out two-dollar bills and pairs of concert tickets to the general public. The Adam and Bob Show soon became listener favorites, ranked at or near the top of the ratings in the Akron market throughout their entire tenure, and were even ranked among the top 25 morning shows nationwide by Radio & Records in the fall of 1983. Jones and Allen became best known for their many comedic segments and laid-back presentation, with an on-air chemistry so prevalent that they often concluded their shows in fits of laughter.

Bob Friend was another mainstay who joined the station in 1967 doing production work, then moving into on-air duties hosting afternoon drive the following year. Friend, however, is perhaps best known for hosting the late-evening shift on WAKR, an hour-long portion of which was named The Dream Machine, devoted to dream analysis provided by Friend from people calling in to the station. The Dream Machine feature became so popular that Bob Friend continued to host speaking engagements with different community groups relating to dream interpretations for many years after it was cancelled in 1991.

Accentuating the station's prolific sports coverage, Mike Snyder was named sports director for WAKR in September 1982, announcing games for the Kent State Golden Flashes, the Akron Zips, and the Cleveland Force. Currently the sports director for WTAM and in-studio host for the Cleveland Cavaliers Radio Network, Snyder left the station on October 20, 1984, after competitor WSLR picked up the local rights to Force radio broadcasts. Jeff Phelps began his broadcast career in 1981 as a color commentator for Kent State Golden Flashes football broadcasts on WAKR, and co-hosted a weekly program with Kent State football coach Ed Chlebek on WAKR-TV; Phelps left the station in October 1982 for a position at KJAC-TV in Port Arthur, Texas. Denny Schreiner also served as WAKR and WAKR-TV's sports director prior to joining ESPN as lead play-by-play voice for their PBA Tour coverage.

=== Sales and transitions ===
Reportedly under pressure from the FCC, WAKR, WONE-FM and the other Summit/Group One radio stations were sold to DKM Broadcasting, a unit of Dyson-Kissner-Moran, on July 15, 1986, for approximately $60–65 million. Employees found out about the sale when they were presented their paychecks; the notes also mentioned that negotiations had been underway between the two parties for six months. While expressing sadness at selling the radio group, Roger G. Berk asserted that Group One would enter a new direction in television production with their Creative Technologies, Inc. firm, along with computerized programming and consulting; the deal was later attributed as one made at the height of the junk bond frenzy of the mid-late 1980s. WAKR-TV was retained by the Berk family under the Group One name; a columnist for the Akron Beacon Journal jokingly mused, "does that mean that Channel 23 is now a group of one?"

Summit/Group One had previously filed a trademark for the WAKR call sign on August 6, 1985, this trademark has since been cancelled. As the trademark rights were transferred to DKM, WAKR-TV was changed to WAKC when the deal closed on October 31; the Berk family invested the profits from the sale into the TV station. Due to the sale, WAKR and WONE-FM moved operations into a separate facility on the city's western side but otherwise maintained the same on-air presentation—so much so that WAKR made headlines when they began using a new sounder for their local newscasts the following October, retiring a teletype-based musical introduction that had been in use for over 30 years.

Less than three weeks after DKM Broadcasting announced that the company would undergo an initial public offering, the company announced a merger with cable television system operator Summit Communications Group on September 15, 1987, for $200 million, the deal closed the following January. Unrelated to former owner Summit Radio, Summit Communications Group was controlled by the family of C. Boyden Gray; Gray publicly severed his ties to the company and other related business interests following media scrutiny after his appointment as White House Counsel to President George H. W. Bush. As a consequence of a restructured contract with the Cleveland Cavaliers Radio Network that gave the NBA franchise priority over all other teams, WAKR declined to renew their contract for the Akron Zips at the start of the 1989 football season, resulting in game coverage being moved to WZIP; this ended a relationship that had been in place since the 1950s. The Cavaliers would remain with WAKR through the 2025–26 season.

I think I did some good work here. I have four statewide awards to show for it. I can walk out of here with my head up and a lot of friends... I don't feel anything but good about the people I have worked with and the job I have done here.

— Don Ursetti

At the start of 1989, Summit purchased two stations from the FCC-ordered breakup of Fairlawn-based GenCorp's RKO General: WFYR (103.5 FM) in Chicago on January 4 for a combined $21 million, (Note: Due to the way that the FCC ordered the divestiture of RKO General's broadcast properties, Summit Communications Group paid RKO General a total of $13.5 million, and four parties that had previously challenged the broadcast license to WFYR were paid $7.3 million.) and WRKS (98.7 FM) in New York City on May 10 for a combined $50 million. (Note: As was the case with WFYR's sale, Summit Communications Group paid RKO General $32.5 million, and paid a total of $17.5 million to competing applicants for WRKS-FM's license.) Following published reports that Summit would soon divest WAKR and WONE-FM as a result of the RKO General station purchases, Summit reached a deal to sell both stations to Ragan A. Henry's U.S. Radio for $13 million on June 5, 1989. An African-American, Henry purchased both stations under one of multiple partnerships and groups he had controlling interest in, FCC regulations set up to encourage minority ownership permitted him to own up to 14 am and 14 FM stations. Despite having received approval by the FCC and after having announced multiple subsequent purchase agreements, the sale of WAKR and WONE-FM did not close until the following January, due to issues securing financing for the actual payment.

While WAKR celebrated their 50th anniversary in October 1990 with fanfare, the station was also starting to deal with declining ratings outside of morning drive and significant budget cuts under U.S. Radio. Sports director Don Ursetti was dismissed on March 30, 1990; the next day, the station announced it had declined to renew its affiliation with the Cleveland Indians Radio Network. WAKR returned to the Indians Radio Network for the following season. (Note: WAKR has been affiliated with what is now the Cleveland Guardians Radio Network from 1951 to 1966, from 1968 to 1978, from 1979 to 1989, and from 1991 to the present day.)

=== The "Friday Massacre" ===
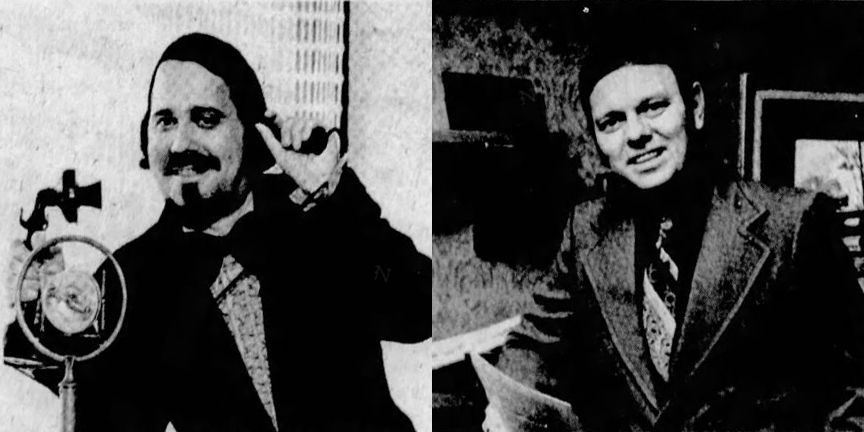
Adam Jones (left) and Bob Allen (right)

On May 31, 1991, a date later referred to as "The Friday Massacre" by personality Bob Friend, WAKR abruptly dropped all music programming in favor of talk radio. such a format change had been discussed before by station management, but research did not justify it at the time. Among the personalities dismissed were Friend, WAKR program director Bill Hart, and Adam Jones, while Jones' co-host Bob Allen was retained to host the morning-drive news program. The Spring 1991 Birch Survey—completed after the format change—showed The Adam and Bob Show tied with Stan Piatt at WNIR for the number one ranking in morning drive. Despite this, the station's overall ratings had been on a substantial decline from the mid-1980s onward due to increased competition from FM stations. General manager Fred Anthony noted that WAKR benefited from listeners tuning in whenever major news events took place, and the music selections had become incidental. Friend regarded the firings as beneficial to WAKR's bottom line, especially after having become part of the U.S. Radio chain, a claim Anthony refuted.

Along with an extended newscast block in afternoon drive, and an hour-long newscast at noon, WAKR picked up The Rush Limbaugh Show on a one-hour tape delay (it had been added to the lineup several weeks before the format switch) and a local talk show hosted by Bill Hall. Announcer Dave Milo was assigned to host a nightly sports program, and Anthony promised to restore the station's coverage of high school sporting events. The Larry King Show, which WAKR had carried in overnights since 1978, (Note: WHLO carried The Larry King Show from January to August 1981.) was retained; after King moved his talk show to late afternoons in February 1993, WAKR took both Rush and King's programs live, cancelling the noon and afternoon news blocks and dismissing four staffers. Hall left the station on April 29, 1993, after undisclosed "philosophical differences" with station management, his replacement in the late-morning timeslot was Dan Gaffney.

WAKR and WONE-FM were once again sold on August 4, 1993, to WQMX owner Gordon-Thomas Communications, Inc., headed by Thom Mandel; Gordon-Thomas also announced a pending name change to the Rubber City Radio Group. Like the Berk family before him, Mandel's family had industrial roots; Thom's father Morton Mandel founded what would become Premier Industrial Corporation in 1946, now a part of Premier Farnell. With an estimated value of $9.3 million, including a five-year non-compete preventing U.S. Radio and Ragan Henry from purchasing any other stations in the Akron market, the deal closed that December 6, with Mandel directly taking over station operations that day.

=== Full-service restoration ===
I love radio. I learned the hard way that the older you get, the more difficult it is to find a job... you can be terrible, but if you're around for 23 years, people will love you.

— Bob Friend

Following extensive research and studies commissioned by Thom Mandel, WAKR reverted to their previous full-service format on February 25, 1994. Dan Gaffney's show, Rush Limbaugh and Larry King were all dropped from the lineup and replaced with a restored extended noon newscast and music blocks hosted by Bob Allen and Bob Friend in late mornings and afternoons; Dave Milo's sports program was retained. Mandel said of the changes, "I saw a boo-boo and I tried to fix it... people were still bemoaning the loss of their radio station. I'm in business to give them what they want", and described the music selections as "the good stuff" from the 1950s through the 1970s. Along with Milo's program, national talk shows from Bruce Williams and Jim Bohannon aired in the evening and overnight hours.

Due to increasing difficulties with landing advertisers and sponsors for the music blocks, the station went back to a talk radio format on August 4, 1997, resulting in Friend departing for a second time, while Christy Maxx, who joined the station the year before, was reassigned within the Rubber City cluster. Unlike the station's first time with the format, WAKR's lineup was almost entirely syndicated, including America in The Morning hosted by Jim Bohannon, ESPN Radio's The Fabulous Sports Babe, and Cincinnati-based humorist Gary Burbank; the locally based newscast blocks in morning drive and noon were retained. Burbank's show was eventually replaced with ESPN's The Tony Kornheiser Show and an afternoon program hosted by former WAKC sports anchor Phil Ferguson.

Former station logo used throughout the 1990s until 2020

WAKR dropped the majority of talk programming from the lineup on September 7, 1999, and switched to a satellite-fed adult standards format using Westwood One's AM Only service; Phil Ferguson was moved to morning drive, while Bob Allen was moved to the noon news block. Coincidentally, "AM Only" program director Chick Watkins worked at WCUE and WCUE-FM (96.5) as program director from 1956 to 1970, and had like duties for Cleveland's WGAR (1220 AM) from 1970 to 1982; his reappearance led some listeners to believe that he was doing his on-air work in Akron, while in reality he was at the Westwood One studios in Los Angeles. The network "AM Only" programming also resulted in Jerry Healey unofficially returning to the station, as Healey was the format's weekend late evening host dating back to when it launched under the Transtar Radio Networks name.

=== From oldies to talk to soft AC ===
Keeping the flame of 1590 WAKR, a vital and historic radio station burning brightly is not a job, it's a privilege. Add to that I get to compile and manage a library of songs we all grew up with, well, just try to drag me out of here.

— Chuck Collins, WAKR website bio

The station formally dropped all satellite programming on August 30, 2006, in favor of an all-local lineup, centered around Chuck Collins in late mornings, Bob Allen in middays, and Tim Daugherty in afternoons, respectively; Ray Horner—host of the morning news program since December 2000—was retained. A market veteran who previously worked as production director for WWWM (105.7 FM) in Cleveland and as program director for WKDD (96.5 FM) in Akron, Collins was hired as WAKR's program director in 2006, then promoted to operations manager for the three-station group in October 2007. WAKR also evolved its playlist to an oldies format at this time, while Bob Allen moved from afternoons to weekends before retiring on February 23, 2010. WAKR commemorated their 70th anniversary in 2010 by reviving many of their classic jingles from the 1960s and 1970s, while also airing montages and airchecks from past personalities.

I always thought Chuck's strength was being positive, making people feel good about where they're working and what they're doing, and then he came back and tried to add onto that positive image... positive energy but yet continue to help you do better at your job, and feeling better as a person.

— Ray Horner, on Chuck Collins

Chuck Collins took an extended medical leave from the station in July 2013 after the discovery of a brain tumor. Collins had suffered symptoms for several months before the diagnosis, including a brief moment of partial paralysis in-studio, which was previously mistaken for hypertension. A mystery writer on the side who published The Radio Murderers: The Collectors in 2011, intended to have been the first book in a series, he chronicled his surgery and subsequent treatments in an e-book memoir, RoBBing Mind: How Attitude and Intention Helped Prevent a Fate Worse Than Death. Collins ultimately never recovered and died less than two years later.

Due to his departure from the station, WAKR slowly moved back to a talk radio format for a third time. On February 24, 2014, the station added a local midday program hosted by news anchor/reporter Jasen Sokol, The Dave Ramsey Show, and a nightly sports program hosted by Brad Russell. Former WHBC host Sam Bourquin joined WAKR that November, replacing Dave Ramsey, and later teamed up with Russell to co-host the Sam & Brad Show. Ray Horner was eventually promoted to program director for WAKR as Collins' successor in June 2016.

The station reverted to a full-service/soft adult contemporary music mix branded as "Soft Hits 93.5 FM" on January 24, 2020; coinciding with the switch, midday host Jasen Sokol left the station to join WJCU in a management capacity, while Sam Bourquin, Brad Russell, Ben Thomas, and Aaron Coleman were all dismissed.

== Programming ==
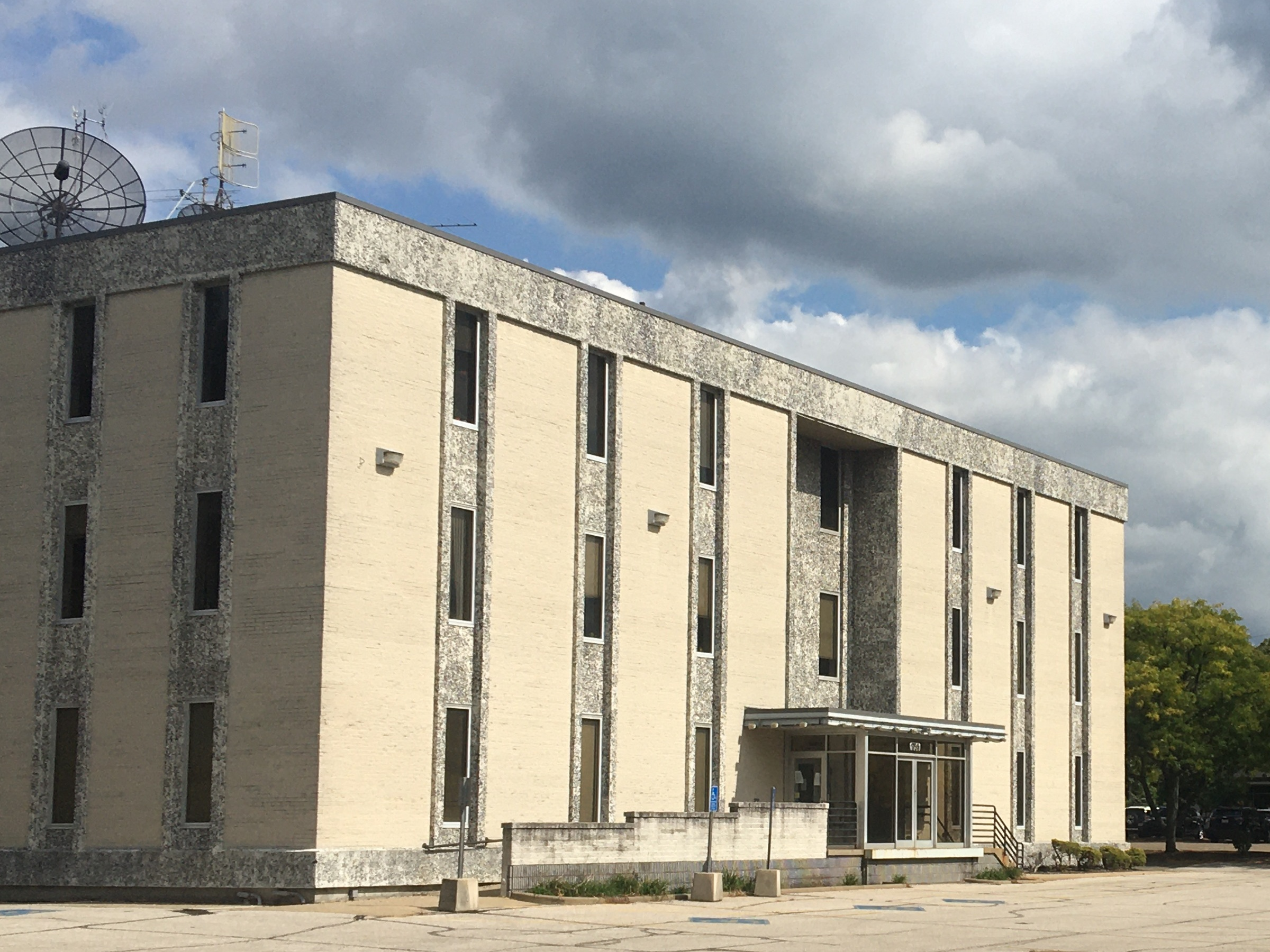
WAKR's studios, the Akron Radio Center, located in Akron's Wallhaven neighborhood.

Local personalities on WAKR include Sandy Bennett, Tim Daugherty and Nick Anthony on weekdays, and Sue Wilson, Rick Allen, and Jeanne Destro on weekends. Ray Horner hosts the morning-drive news program. WAKR is the Akron affiliate for the Cleveland Browns (shared with WONE-FM), the Cleveland Guardians and Ohio State Buckeyes radio networks. Horner previously served as the lead play-by-play voice for WAKR's high school sports broadcast coverage.

Public affairs programming on Sunday mornings includes the audio portion of Forum 360, produced with the Jewish Community Center of Akron and WNEO/WEAO. Originally titled Civic Forum of the Air, Forum 360 has aired weekly on WAKR since June 4, 1961, and has been simulcast on television throughout its entire run.

== FM translator ==
On June 5, 2019, WAKR began broadcasting on a low-power FM translator, W228EL (93.5 FM). This translator was one of up to 873 applications initially filed by AM stations nationwide in 2018 as part of the FCC's "AM Revitalization" program. The transmitter for W228EL is located in Akron's West Akron neighborhood on a tower used by WONE-FM and several other stations.

Broadcast translator for WAKR
Call sign	Frequency	City of license	FID	ERP (W)	HAAT	Class	Transmitter coordinates	FCC info
W228EL	93.5 FM	Akron, Ohio	202752	225	176 m (577 ft)	D	41°03′53.00″N 81°34′59.00″W	LMS

Signal contours for WAKR and associated translator.; Daytime groundwave 2 mV/m signal for WAKR; Grade A 60 dBu signal for W228EL

== Bibliography ==
- Freed, Judith Fisher (November 4, 2010). "Archives: Radio Broadcast (1943–1949)". AlanFreed.com. Archived from the original on January 27, 2020.
- Price, Mark J. (2015). Lost Akron. Charleston, SC: The History Press. pp. 165–168. ISBN 9781625851079. Archived from the original on January 21, 2022.
- Ritchey, David; Miles, Thomas (October 1993). "WAKR Radio: A History" (PDF). School of Communications. The University of Akron. Archived (PDF) from the original on March 4, 2017 – via Education Resources Information Center.
- United States, Federal Communications Commission (1967). Federal Communications Commission Reports: Decisions and Reports of the Federal Communications Commission of the United States: Volume 4, Second Series, July 1, 1966 to September 30, 1966. Washington, D.C.: U.S. Government Printing Office. pp. 533–535. Archived from the original on January 21, 2022.

== Documentaries ==
- Russo, Cheri (April 1, 2008). Akron, Ohio: The City Where Commercial Television News Went to Black (Television production). Athens, Ohio: WOUB-TV. Archived from the original on October 15, 2008.
