= WQMX =

Radio station in Medina–Akron, Ohio

- Medina, Ohio; United States
- Broadcast area: Akron metro area Greater Cleveland; Metro Canton
- Frequency: 94.9 MHz
- RDS: 1. WQMX; 2. Your Country
- Branding: FM 94.9 WQMX

Programming
- Format: Country music

Ownership
- Owner: Rubber City Radio Group, Inc.
- Sister stations: WAKR; WONE-FM; WNWV

History
- First air date: October 17, 1960
- Former call signs: WDBN (1960–1988)
- Call sign meaning: former "Mix" branding

Technical information
- Licensing authority: FCC
- Facility ID: 43872
- Class: B
- ERP: 16,000 watts
- HAAT: 268 meters (879 ft)
- Transmitter coordinates: 41°4′58″N 81°38′0″W

Links
- Public license information: Public file; LMS
- Webcast: Listen live
- Website: wqmx.com

WQMX (94.9 FM) is a commercial radio station licensed to Medina, Ohio, carrying a country format known as "FM 94.9 WQMX". Owned by Rubber City Radio Group, Inc., the station primarily serves the Akron metro area, but also can be heard in Greater Cleveland and Canton. WQMX's studios are located in Akron, while the station transmitter resides in the neighboring suburb of Copley Township. In addition to a standard analog transmission, WQMX's programming is available online.

== History ==
WQMX began as WDBN on October 17, 1960, originally under license to Barberton, Ohio. The station had a quiet sign-on, with no stories or coverage in area newspapers until a mention within an appliance store advertisement in the Orrville Courier Crescent that December 15.

WDBN was one of the early adopters of the beautiful music format that minimized announcements and included no vocal music. Jim Schulke, one of the early beautiful music format programmers, developed much of his programming philosophies at the station. WDBN was also an early adopter of FM stereo, broadcasting in FM stereo by November 1961. The station also became one of the first FM stations in the Cleveland market to fully automate programming, having installed the equipment in 1964 for purposes of format control. Consequently, WDBN attained a significant ratings presence by 1966, drawing more listeners than WKYC (1100 AM) during the midday time period; Ted Niarhos boasted that the station was now able to compete for advertisers with the Cleveland market's AM stations. A WDBN advertisement in the Cleveland Plain Dealer promoted itself as the "Miracle of Medina".

When the FCC limited class B FM signals (the highest classification for FM stations in the area) to a maximum ERP of 50 kW, WDBN was "grandfathered" and allowed to maintain its 188 kW signal. As a result, the station blanketed the Cleveland market and could be heard throughout Northeast Ohio and was frequently heard as far away as Flint, Michigan, although its signal in Cleveland proper was spotty due to the terrain between Cleveland and Medina, due to the tower residing in the unincorporated village of River Styx on an unnamed county road eventually renamed "Tower Road". By May 19, 1965, the station had changed its city of license to Medina, Ohio. A windstorm in Medina County in February 1967 destroyed WDBN's tower; as insurance refused to cover a replacement tower, station advertisers and listeners covered the costs instead.

Ted Niarhos sold WDBN to Robert Miller and associated investors in 1968 for $1 million, the highest price ever paid for an FM station at a time. Miller's father Ray T. Miller founded WERE (1300 AM) and WERE-FM (98.5) in Cleveland, and thus had an ownership stake in parent Cleveland Broadcasting Incorporated, which also owned WLEC and WLEC-FM in Sandusky and KFAC and KFAC-FM in Los Angeles; Miller concurrently divested that stake into an irrevocable trust. Robert Miller's wife Pamela Miller also started to work for the station, eventually becoming WDBN's program director.

WDBN adopted the brand "The Quiet Island (in radio's sea of noise)" on August 15, 1970, eventually having the phrase registered as a trademark by 1981; the trademark expired in 2002. The station's format presentation was notably very tightly focused, focusing on orchestral music and instrumentals with no improvisational moments, strict tempo settings for specific dayparts, and selections of songs with familiarity and appeal to the 25-49 demographic. WDBN was headlined in the early 1970s by veteran television newscaster Tom Field in afternoons, along with vice president Jeff Baxter, program director Gary Short, news director Walt Henrich, and announcers Cameron Douglas and Brooks Morton. Veteran announcer David Mark joined WDBN as a morning announcer in 1980, replacing Jim Field. The station was one of many in the region to carry a beautiful music format during the late 1970s and early 1980s; area competitors included Cleveland market stations WQAL, WDOK and WKSW (99.5 FM); Akron market station WAEZ (97.5 FM); and Elyria-licensed WBEA (107.3 FM).

The station was sold to Gordon-Thomas Communications, Inc.—headed by Gordon Steinbeck and Thom Mandel—for $4.6 million in March 1988, the deal closed that June 2nd. Steinbeck and Mandel were local broadcasting veterans; Steinbeck previously served as general manager for WLTF (106.5 FM) and WRMR (850 AM), and Mandel was formerly a part time DJ at WGAR-FM. After taking over WDBN on August 15, 1988, the call letters were changed to WQMX and the format was changed to adult contemporary as "Mix 94.9"; radio personality Bill Miller was heard during this time. It switched to a country format on April 5, 1993.

Gordon-Thomas Communications changed its name to Rubber City Radio Group on December 6, 1993, the same day that it purchased WAKR and WONE-FM. Under Rubber City's direction, the station has targeted the Akron broadcast market as "Akron's Own Country", though it is still heard in much of the Cleveland area.

On December 30, 2019, Cleveland market sister station WNWV began simulcasting WQMX, although the simulcast lasted only until January 3, 2020.

== Current programming ==
All programming on WQMX is local in origin, featuring a full 24 hour airstaff on weekends, including Northeast Ohio radio veterans Sandy Bennett, Glenn Anderson, Mac, and Rick Allen. Weekday personalities include Scott Wynn and Sarah Kay mornings, Cherise on middays, Ben McKee on afternoon drive, Carly Quinn on evenings and Eric Matthews on overnights. On January 24, 2019, Kay was announced as the new WQMX assistant program director, while also remaining as co-host of the station's morning show. In December 2021, Kay was named the station’s Program Director. In April 2022, Cherise added Music Director duties, and in March 2023 she was named Assistant Program Director as well.
