= John Gorman (radio executive) =

American radio executive (born 1950)

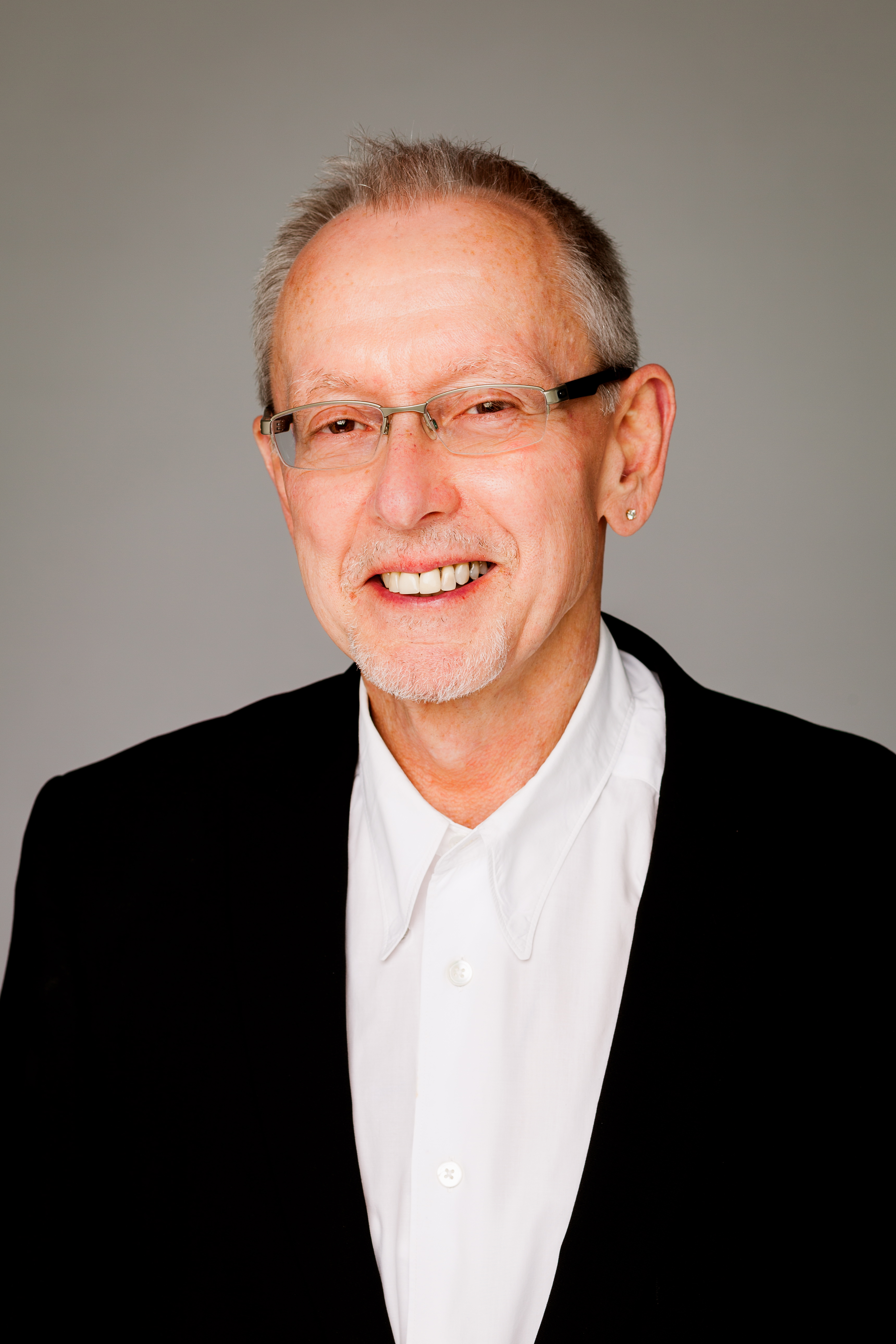
- Born: May 7, 1950 (age 76); Malden, Massachusetts, United States
- Education: Boston College
- Occupations: Radio executive, author, media consultant, Chief Content Officer

John Gorman (born 1950) is a radio personality, executive, and author from Cleveland, Ohio. On September 21, 2007, he published his memoir, The Buzzard: Inside The Glory Days of WMMS and Cleveland Rock Radio.

== Early life ==
John Gorman was born in Malden, Massachusetts. At the age of 12, he first began operating a private radio station from his family home. As a teenager, he worked in the commercial radio industry as a programming assistant, music director, and talk show producer, where he remained until his move to Cleveland in 1973.

== Career and achievements ==
He graduated from Boston College.

Gorman began he broadcasting career in Boston, Massachusetts before moving to Cleveland, Ohio to pursue a radio career. He began working at WMMS, a small free-form radio station that was recently under new ownership.

John Gorman worked at WMMS for 13 years in Cleveland, where he adjusted the format of WMMS based upon a broad interpretation of the category of rock and roll music.

In 2000, Gorman was inducted into the Broadcaster's Hall of Fame. Gorman was inducted into the Cleveland Association of Broadcasters' Hall of Fame in April 2008.

In 2015, Gorman was the chief content officer of oWOW Radio, an Internet radio station based in Cleveland. oWOW Radio was taken off the air in January 2021.

Gorman helped to start station 98.5 WNCX.

== Bibliography ==
- Gorman, John (2007). The Buzzard: Inside the Glory Days of WMMS and Cleveland Rock Radio—A Memoir. Cleveland, OH: Gray & Company, Publishers. ISBN 978-1-59851-051-5
