= WONE-FM =

Classic rock radio station in Akron, Ohio

- Akron, Ohio; United States
- Broadcast area: Akron metro area
- Frequency: 97.5 MHz (HD Radio)
- Branding: 97.5 WONE

Programming
- Format: Classic rock
- Affiliations: Cleveland Browns Radio Network

Ownership
- Owner: Rubber City Radio Group, Inc.
- Sister stations: WAKR; WNWV; WQMX

History
- First air date: October 12, 1947
- Former call signs: WAKR-FM (1947–1974); WAEZ (1974–1985)
- Call sign meaning: "Group One Broadcasting"

Technical information
- Licensing authority: FCC
- Facility ID: 43873
- Class: B
- ERP: 12,000 watts
- HAAT: 271 meters (889 ft)
- Transmitter coordinates: 41°03′51.00″N 81°34′59.00″W

Links
- Public license information: Public file; LMS
- Webcast: Listen live
- Website: wone.net

WONE-FM (97.5 FM) is a commercial radio station licensed to Akron, Ohio, featuring an AOR-leaning classic rock format known as "97.5 WONE". Owned by Rubber City Radio Group, Inc., the station primarily serves the Akron metro area. In addition to a standard analog transmission, WONE-FM broadcasts over one HD Radio channel (as of April 2020) and is available online. Both the studios and transmitter for WONE-FM are located in Akron.

== History ==
The station signed on the air in October 1947 as WAKR-FM. It was co-owned with WAKR. In 1974, the station adopted the callsign WAEZ, playing easy listening and beautiful music. The station adopted its current rock format as WONE-FM on January 1, 1985, when then owner Group One Broadcasting obtained permission to share the WONE base callsign of its sister station WONE in Dayton.

Prior to the transition from WAEZ "Easy 97" to WONE, general manager Fred Anthony hired the first group of on-air personalities with the assistance of national PD Art Wonderlich (Art Wonder). This would included Deeya McKay, Mike Michelli, Tim Daugherty, Jim Chenot, and Dan Slentz. Their program director would be Ward Holmes. For weeks leading up to the transition, the new on-air staff would go through real-time shifts that were only "skimmed" on air checks (announcing portion) and reviewed by Holmes with the staff. Slentz finished his last "fake" broadcast shift as overnight person on January 1, 1985, at 5a.m. Engineers would cut over from the WAEZ reel-to-reel automation system at 5:30a.m., and GM Fred Anthony made the announcement of the format change. A few minutes after that, McKay would open the mic and play WONE's first rock song, "Old Time Rock and Roll" by Bob Seger and the Silver Bullet Band.

== Current programming ==
In addition to its music format, the station is the full-power FM Akron affiliate of the Cleveland Browns Radio Network. On February 1, 2013, WONE-FM announced that local radio veteran Jeff Kinzbach, best known from his years at WMMS in Cleveland, would take over the station's morning shift. Jeff retired from WONE on September 30, 2020. Current personalities include Sandra Miller and Dave Spano (mornings), Tim Daugherty (middays), and Kathy Vogel (afternoons) with Alice's Attic With Alice Cooper, Mac, and Amy Malone on weekends.
