= Timeline of Cleveland =

This article is a timeline of the history of the city of Cleveland, Ohio, USA.

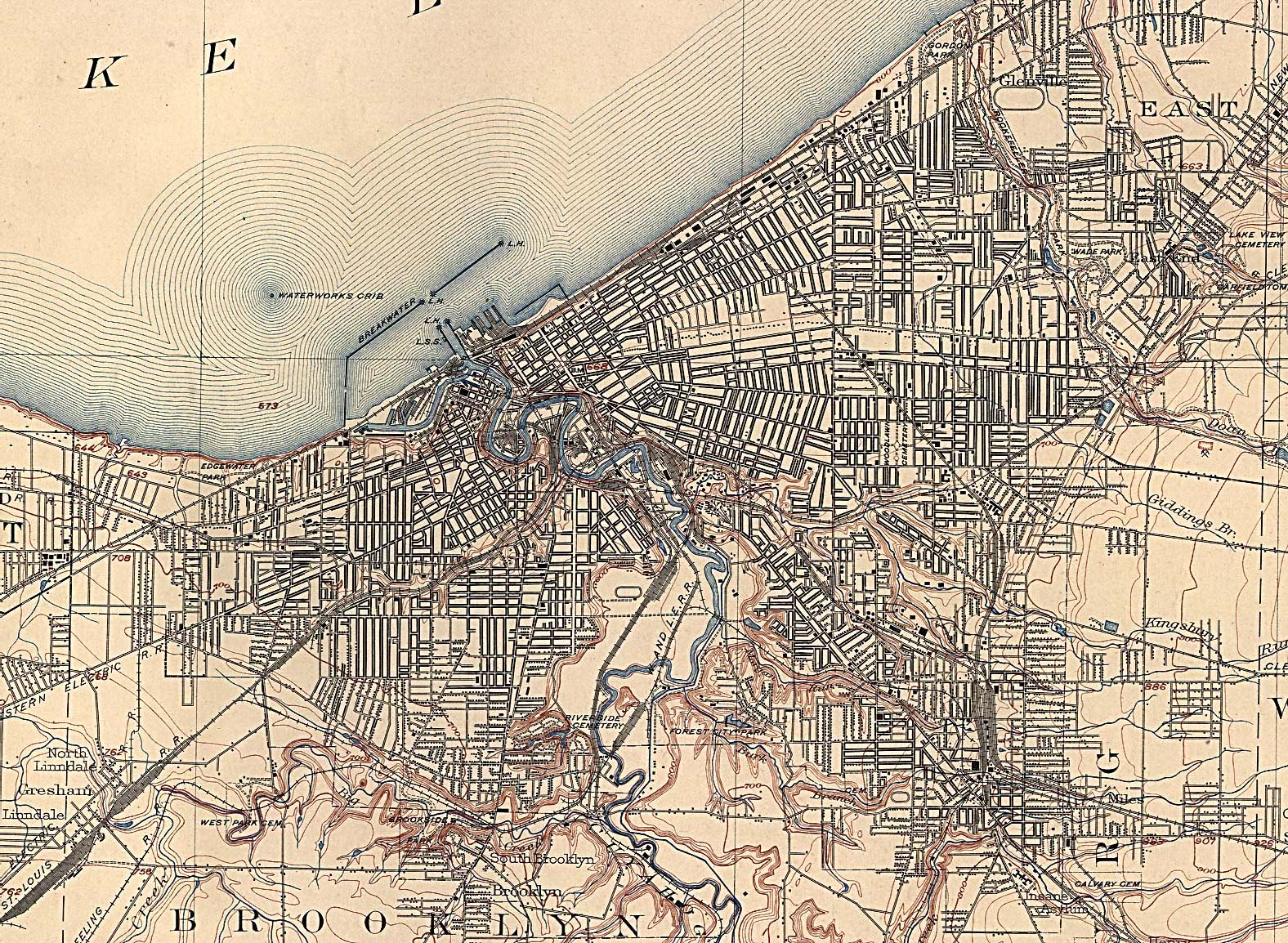
1904 map of Cleveland

== 18th century ==
- 1796 – Moses Cleaveland and survey party arrive at the location that would later become Cleveland.
- 1797 – Lorenzo Carter, a prominent early settler, arrives.

== 19th century ==
- 1800 – Trumbull County created, encompassing Cleveland.
- 1803 – Ohio becomes the 17th State admitted to the Union.
- 1805 – Geauga County created, encompassing Cleveland.
- 1808 – Lorenzo Carter builds the Zephyr, the first ship to be launched in Cleveland.
- 1810 – Cuyahoga County organized; Cleveland selected as county seat.
- 1813 – Oliver Hazard Perry wins the Battle of Lake Erie at Put-in-Bay in the War of 1812.
- 1814
  - Cleveland receives its charter as a village.
  - Newburgh Township created.
- 1815
  - Alfred Kelley is elected the first president of the village of Cleveland.
  - Euclid Avenue commissioned, subsequently known as Millionaires' Row.
- 1818 – The Cleveland Gazette and Commercial Register, Cleveland's first newspaper is published.
- 1822 – a free bridge is opened across the Cuyahoga River.
- 1827 – opening of the Ohio canal as far as Akron.
- 1830 – population: 1,076.
- 1831
  - The Cleveland Advertiser alters the spelling of the community's name to Cleveland.
  - James A. Garfield, 20th United States President, born in Orange Township.
- 1832 – Ohio and Erie Canal completed to the Ohio River.
- 1836
  - Cleveland and Ohio City are incorporated as cities.
  - John W. Willey is elected the first mayor of Cleveland.
  - Bridge War between Cleveland and Ohio City takes place.
- 1837 – Cleveland City Council votes to create City Hospital, now MetroHealth.
- 1840 – population: 6,071.
- 1842 – The Plain Dealer begins publication.
- 1844 – Samuel Starkweather elected mayor.
- 1845 – City Bank of Cleveland (forerunner of National City Corp.) founded.
- 1847
  - The Weddell House opens.
  - The first telegraph line (from Cleveland to Pittsburgh) is completed.
- 1848 – Colored National Convention held in city.
- 1850
  - William Case elected mayor.
  - Population: 17,034.
- 1851 – Cleveland, Columbus and Cincinnati Railroad completed.
- 1852 – The Aliened American newspaper begins publication.
- 1853
  - National Hall (later known as the Cleveland Theater and Academy of Music) opens
  - National Women's Rights Convention held.
  - Woodland Cemetery established.
- 1854
  - Ohio City annexed to Cleveland.
  - William B. Castle elected mayor.
  - The Cleveland Leader begins publication.
- 1860
  - Perry Monument on Public Square dedicated.
  - Population: 43,417.
- 1861
  - Abraham Lincoln visits Cleveland.
  - The American Civil War begins.
- 1865
  - The American Civil War ends.
  - Thousands of Clevelanders mourn the death of Lincoln.
- 1866 – Cleveland Police Department established.
- 1869
  - Cleveland Public Library established.
  - Lake View Cemetery opens.
- 1870
  - Standard Oil Company in business.
  - Population: 92,829.
- 1873
  - Cleveland Bar Association established.
  - Newburgh annexed to Cleveland.
- 1874 – First Woman's National Temperance Convention held in Cleveland, establishing the Woman's Christian Temperance Union.
- 1875 – Euclid Avenue Opera House opens.
- 1876
  - Charles F. Brush patents an electric generator.
  - Riverside Cemetery Chapel & Riverside Cemetery Gatehouse built.
- 1878 – Penny Press, predecessor to the Cleveland Press, begins publication.
- 1880
  - James A. Garfield, from Cleveland, elected 20th President of the United States.
  - Case School of Applied Science established.
  - Population: 160,146.
- 1881
  - Garfield lies in state on Public Square after being assassinated, July 2.
  - Adelbert Hall built.
- 1882
  - Western Reserve College moves to Cleveland.
  - Cleveland School of Art established.
- 1883 – John H. Farley elected mayor.
- 1884
  - First electric streetcar run in the city; the first such installation in the country.
  - Cleveland Electric Light Co. formed.
- 1887 – Michelson–Morley experiment conducted at Western Reserve University.
- 1890
  - The Arcade opens.
  - Garfield Monument dedicated in Lake View Cemetery.
  - Population: 261,353.
- 1894
  - May Day Riots of 1894
  - Soldiers and Sailors Monument dedicated.
- 1895 – Robert E. McKisson elected mayor.
- 1896 – Cleveland celebrates its centennial.

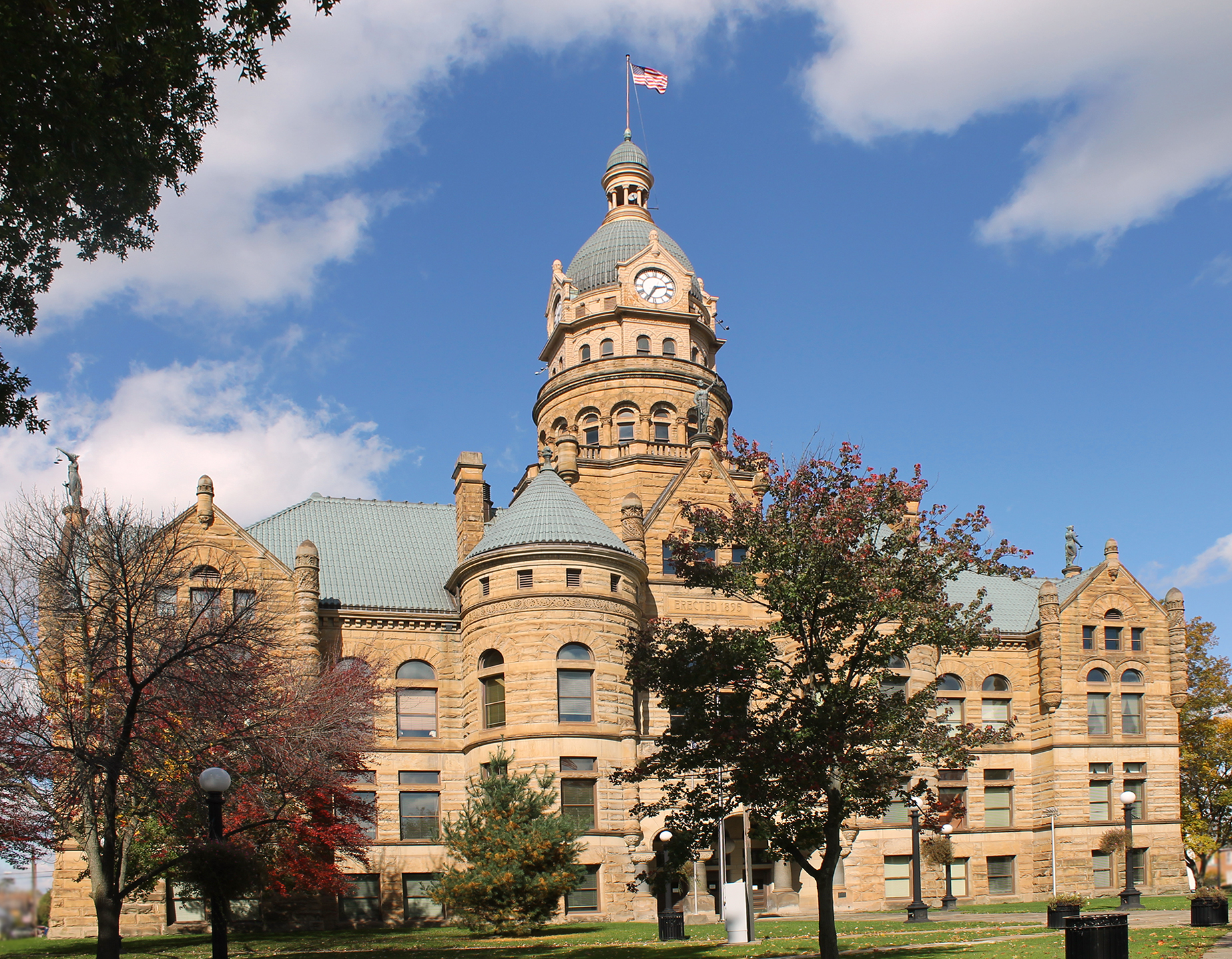
Trumbull County Courthouse. The first Trumbull County Courthouse was built in 1815. It was replaced by a second, larger courthouse in 1854. A third courthouse, and the one still standing today, was completed in 1897 after the previous one was destroyed by a fire in 1895.

- 1897 – Bohemian National Hall built.
- 1899
  - Cleveland streetcar strike.
  - John H. Farley re-elected mayor.
- 1900 – population: 381,768.

== 20th century ==
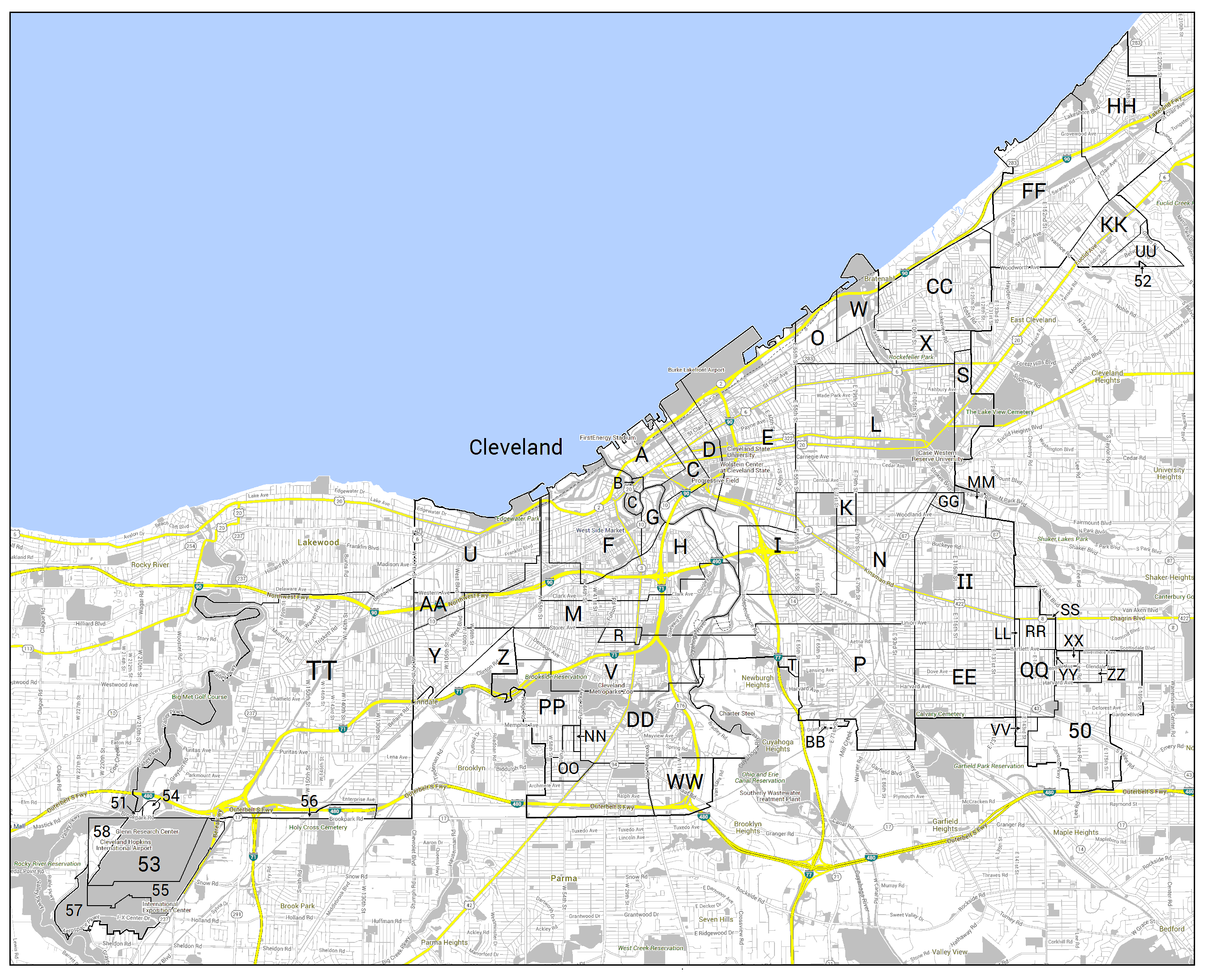
Map of Territorial Changes to the City of Cleveland

=== 1900s–1940s ===
- 1901
  - Tom L. Johnson elected mayor.
  - The Cleveland Blues (predecessor to the Cleveland Guardians) are established as one of the first teams in the new American League.
  - Cleveland worker and avowed anarchist, Leon Czolgosz assassinates U.S. President William McKinley in Buffalo, New York.
- 1905
  - The Cleveland News begins publication
  - Glenville and South Brooklyn annexed to Cleveland.
- 1908
  - Collinwood School Fire
  - More Streetcar strikes but less violent and unsuccessful.
- 1909
  - Tom L. Johnson loses mayoral race to Herman C. Baehr.
  - Corlett Village annexed to Cleveland.
- 1910
  - Collinwood annexed to Cleveland.
  - Cleveland Railway Company operated from 1910 to 1942.
  - Population: 560,663.
- 1911
  - Tom L. Johnson dies.
  - Church of the Covenant established.
- 1912 – Village of Nottingham annexed to Cleveland.
- 1913
  - The Great Lakes Storm of 1913 hits Cleveland.
  - Home Rule City Charter approved by Cleveland voters.
  - Cleveland Museum of Art established.
  - Metropolitan Theatre opened.
  - The first Community Chest, "Community Fund", founded in Cleveland.
- 1914
  - Cleveland chosen as the Fourth District headquarters of the Federal Reserve Bank.
  - Cleveland Municipal Light Plant goes into operation.
- 1915 – Cleveland Play House and Western Reserve University's School of Applied Social Science established.
- 1916
  - Cleveland Museum of Art opens.
  - Cleveland City Hall dedicated.
- 1917 – Cleveland Metroparks organized.
- 1918
  - Federal Court trial of Eugene V. Debs held in Cleveland.
  - Detroit–Superior Bridge construction completed.
  - The first Cleveland Cripple Survey was published; one of the first accurate disability censuses, that measured the social and economic conditions of individuals considered.
- 1919
  - May Day Riots of 1919
  - State Prohibition is enacted in Cleveland
  - Voters approve placement of a new railroad terminal on Public Square.
- 1920
  - Cleveland Institute of Music founded.
  - Cleveland becomes the fifth-largest city in the nation.
  - The Volstead Act and the Eighteenth Amendment become law.
  - Cleveland Indians win the World Series.
  - Cleveland Museum of Natural History established.
  - Population: 796,841.
- 1921
  - Cleveland Clinic and Playhouse Square established.
  - KeyBank State Theatre built.
  - Mimi Ohio Theatre opened.
  - Hanna Theatre opened.
- 1922 – demolition for the Terminal Tower site begins
- 1923
  - Federal Reserve bank building completed.
  - Alcazar Hotel completed.
- 1924
  - Republican National Convention held in Cleveland.
  - Mayor/Council form of government replaced by City Manager plan.
- 1925
  - New Public Library building opens.
  - Cleveland Airport (now Hopkins International) opens.
  - University Hospitals incorporated.
- 1929
  - Cleveland Clinic disaster occurs.
  - National Air Race first held in Cleveland.
  - The Stock Market crashes
- 1930 – The Tower City Center is dedicated.
- 1931
  - Severance Hall dedicated.
  - City Manager system reverts to the Mayor/Council form of government.
  - Ray T. Miller elected mayor.
- 1932 – Hope Memorial Bridge construction completed.
- 1933
  - Harry L. Davis returns as mayor.
  - Depression-era unemployment peaks in Cleveland: nearly one-third of the city's citizens are out of work.
  - Prohibition is repealed on December 23 – nearly eight months longer than the Eighteenth Amendment.
- 1935
  - Harold Hitz Burton elected mayor.
  - Eliot Ness becomes Safety Director of Cleveland.
- 1936 – Republican National Convention held in Cleveland.
- 1937
  - Cleveland Barons hockey team established.
  - Cleveland Arena opens.
  - Cleveland Rams begin to play professional football.
  - John D. Rockefeller dies.
- 1938
  - Cleveland Memorial Shoreway opens between East 9th Street and Gordon Park.
  - Clevelander Jesse Owens wins four gold medals at Berlin Olympic Games.
  - Great Lakes Exposition opens.
  - Cleveland Torso Murderer with up to 20 victims.
- 1939 – Main Avenue Bridge opened.
- 1940 – NACA, forerunner of NASA, established at the Cleveland airport.
- 1941
  - Frank Lausche elected mayor.
  - Western Reserve Red Cats win the Sun Bowl, the city's first college football bowl game.
- 1942 – Cleveland Bomber Plant (now the I-X Center) opens at Municipal Airport.
- 1944 – Cleveland East Ohio Gas Explosion claims 130 lives.
- 1945
  - Thomas A. Burke elected mayor.
  - Cleveland Rams win NFL football title then move to Los Angeles.
- 1946
  - Cleveland Browns are founded and begin play in All-America Football Conference.
  - Cleveland Browns win the All-America Football Conference championship.
- 1947
  - Operations begin at the lakefront airport.
  - First telecast by WEWS, Ohio's first television station.
  - Eliot Ness runs for mayor of Cleveland but is defeated by incumbent Thomas A. Burke.
  - Cleveland Browns win the All-America Football Conference championship.
- 1948
  - Cleveland Indians win World Series.
  - Cleveland Browns win the All-America Football Conference championship.
- 1949
  - Cleveland named an All-America City for first time.
  - Cleveland Browns win the All-America Football Conference championship.

=== 1950s-1990s ===
- 1950
  - Cleveland Browns begin play in National Football League.
  - Cleveland Browns win the National Football League championship.
- 1953 – Anthony J. Celebrezze elected mayor.
- 1954
  - Last streetcars run.
  - Cleveland Browns win the National Football League championship.
- 1955
  - Rapid Transit begins operation.
  - Cleveland Browns win the National Football League championship.
- 1959 – Boddie Recording Company in business.
- 1960
  - Erieview urban renewal plan unveiled.
  - Final issue of the Cleveland News published.
- 1961 - Mapp v. Ohio
- 1962
  - Ralph S. Locher elected mayor.
  - Innerbelt Freeway opens for its full length.
- 1964
  - Erieview Tower completed.
  - Cleveland State University established.
  - Cleveland Browns win the National Football League championship.
- 1965 – WVIZ, an educational television station, begins broadcasting.
- 1966
  - Hough Riots
  - Cuyahoga Community College opens its Metro Campus.
- 1967
  - Carl B. Stokes elected the first African American mayor of a major American city.
  - Case Western Reserve University established.
- 1968
  - Glenville Shootout
  - Terry v. Ohio
- 1969
  - A burning oil slick on the Cuyahoga River attracts national attention regarding pollution.
  - Euclid Beach Park closes.
- 1970 – Cleveland Cavaliers basketball team organized.
- 1972 – Cleveland Magazine begins publication.
- 1973 – Cleveland Barons play their last hockey game.
- 1974 – Greater Cleveland Regional Transit Authority established.
- 1976 – desegregation of the Cleveland Public Schools ordered by U.S. District Judge Frank J. Battisti.
- 1977 – Dennis Kucinich elected mayor.
- 1978
  - Cleveland is hit by the Great Blizzard of 1978
  - 1978 recall election
  - December 15, Cleveland becomes the first American city to go into default since the Depression.
- 1979
  - George Voinovich elected mayor.
  - Cleveland Foodbank established.
- 1980 – presidential debate between candidates Jimmy Carter and Ronald Reagan held in Cleveland.
- 1981
  - Cleveland Public Theatre opened.
  - City Council reduced from 33 to 21 members.
  - Term of office for mayor and council members increased from two to four years.
- 1982
  - Ground broken for the Sohio (BP) Building on Public Square.
  - The Cleveland Press ceases publication.
  - Cleveland named an All-America City for second time.
- 1984 – Cleveland named an All-America City for third time.
- 1986
  - Cleveland named an All-America City for fourth time.
  - Cleveland selected as site for Rock and Roll Hall of Fame.
- 1987 – Cleveland emerges from default.
- 1988 – Cleveland Neighborhood Progress and Case Western Reserve University's Center on Urban Poverty and Social Change established.
- 1989 – Michael R. White elected mayor.
- 1991 – Key Tower "topped off" at 947 ft (289 m).
- 1993 – Cleveland named an All-America City for fifth time.
- 1995
  - Rock and Roll Hall of Fame and Museum opens.
  - Indians win American League championship.
  - Bishop Anthony Pilla is elected to the presidency of USCCB
- 1996
  - Cleveland celebrates its bicentennial.
  - Cleveland rap group Bone Thugs-n-Harmony win a Grammy for "Tha Crossroads"
- 1997 – Cleveland Indians win the American League pennant and return to the World Series.
- 1999 – the new Cleveland Browns Stadium opens with the return of the Cleveland Browns.

== 21st century ==
- 2001 – Cleveland Barons are revived.
- 2002 – Cleveland citizens elect Jane L. Campbell as the first female mayor of Cleveland.
- 2003 – 2003 North America blackout
- 2004 – vice-presidential candidates Dick Cheney and John Edwards debate at Case Western Reserve University.
- 2005 – Frank G. Jackson is the first sitting city councillor to be elected mayor since Stephen Buhrer in 1867.
- 2006
  - Barons leave Cleveland for the second time.
  - Cleveland, Columbus, and other Ohio cities argue against a bill passed by the Ohio House legislature that will eliminate residency rules.
- 2007
  - Cleveland is hit with a major winter storm in February, leaving 15 inches of snow.
  - October 20, Cleveland became the first television market in the United States to have all of its local television stations to broadcast in high definition.
- 2008 – Cuyahoga County federal corruption investigation.
- 2009
  - The Ohio Supreme Court upholds the 2006 law prohibiting residency requirements.
  - Frank Jackson wins a second term as Mayor of Cleveland.
  - November, Ohio Voters open Ohio to casino gambling and Cleveland will have a casino by 2013.
  - Cleveland is selected by the International Gay Games committee to host the 2014 Gay Games. Cleveland beat out Boston, Washington DC, and Hamburg Germany.
- 2010 – population: 396,815.
- 2011 – construction begins on the Medical Mart and new convention center, scheduled to open late 2013.
- 2013 – Frank Jackson wins a third term as Mayor of Cleveland against Kenneth Lanci.
- 2014
  - Shooting of Tamir Rice
  - Hosts the international 2014 Gay Games, also known as Gay Games 9
- 2015 – Chief U.S. District Judge Solomon Oliver Jr. signs consent decree for the Cleveland Division of Police.
- 2016
  - Cleveland Cavaliers win the NBA Championship.
  - Lake Erie Monsters win the Calder Cup and then are renamed Cleveland Monsters.
  - Republican National Convention held in Cleveland.
  - The Cleveland Indians face the Chicago Cubs in the 2016 World Series.
- 2017 – Frank Jackson wins a fourth term as Mayor of Cleveland, becoming the city's longest-serving mayor.
- 2018 – Cleveland's population begins to flatten as Downtown population increases.
- 2019
  - The Beacon completed in Downtown Cleveland.
  - Cuyahoga River named "River of the Year" by the American Rivers conservation association.
- 2020
  - Population: 372,624.
  - The COVID-19 pandemic in Ohio begins when Ohio Governor Mike DeWine reports the earliest cases of the virus to be in Cuyahoga County.
  - George Floyd protests take place in Cleveland and most major U.S. cities.
  - The Lumen tower completed in Downtown Cleveland.
  - Case Western Reserve University and the Cleveland Clinic host the first 2020 U.S. presidential debate at the Health Education Campus (HEC).
- 2021
  - 2021 NFL draft held in Cleveland at FirstEnergy Stadium.
  - Frank Jackson announces that he will not pursue a fifth term as mayor.
  - The Cleveland Indians assume the name the Cleveland Guardians.
  - Justin Bibb elected mayor.

== See also ==
- History of Cleveland
- Bibliography of Cleveland

Other cities in Ohio

- Timeline of Cincinnati
- Timeline of Columbus, Ohio
- Timeline of Toledo, Ohio
