= Mass media in Cleveland =

The following is a list of media outlets—including print, radio, television and the internet—located in Cleveland, Ohio, United States.

== Print ==
=== Daily ===
- The Plain Dealer

=== Weekly ===
- Call and Post
- Cleveland Jewish News
- Cleveland Scene
- Crain's Cleveland Business
- Sun Newspapers

=== Monthly ===
- Alternative Press
- Cleveland Magazine
- Design World
- EHS Today
- IndustryWeek

=== Defunct ===
- Al-Sahafa
- Bérmunkás
- The Big Us
- Cleveland Free Times
- The Cleveland Gazette
- The Cleveland Leader
- Cleveland News
- Cleveland Press
- The Daily Cleveland Herald
- Homeless Grapevine
- Magazine of Western History
- The Ohio Farmer
- Solidarity
- Union Gospel News

== Radio ==
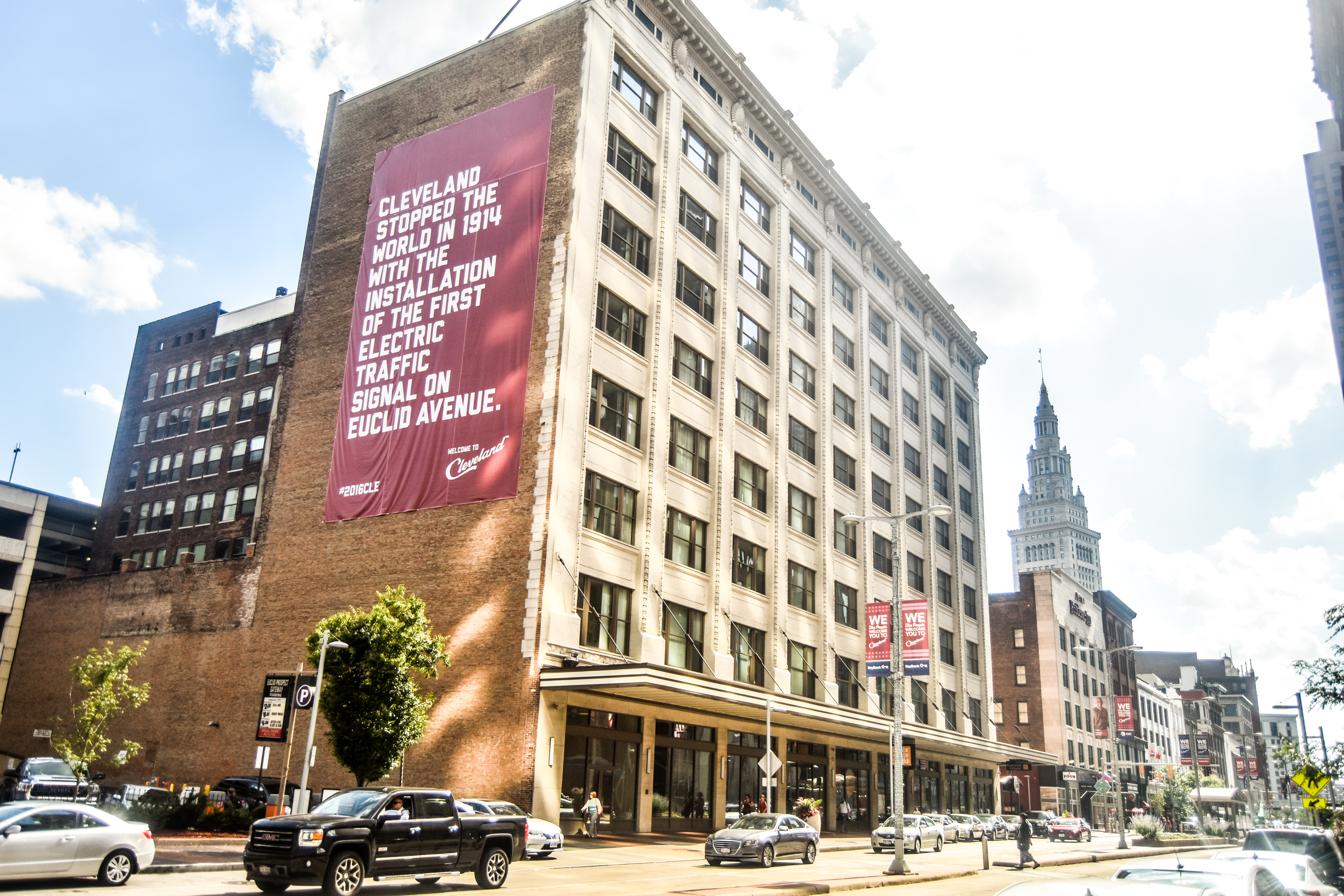
The Six Six Eight Building in Downtown Cleveland, home to all Cleveland market radio stations owned by iHeartMedia

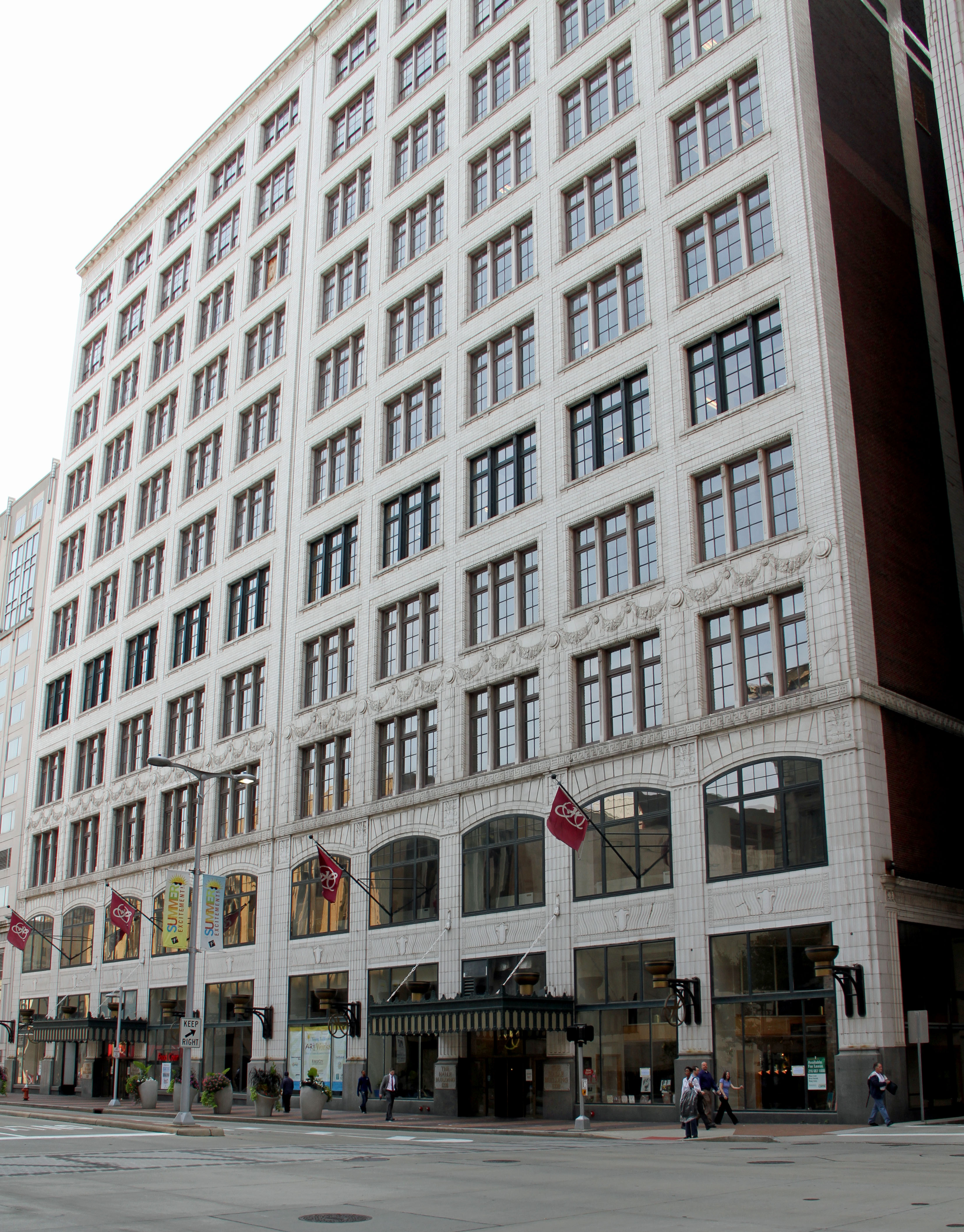
The Halle Building in Downtown Cleveland, home to all Cleveland market radio stations owned by Audacy, Inc.

Greater Cleveland is currently the 35th largest radio market in the United States, as ranked by Nielsen Media Research. While most stations originate in Cleveland proper, this list includes stations licensed within the counties of Cuyahoga, Lorain, Medina, Lake and Geauga that define the market. Stations licensed to Akron but which are specifically marketed to the Cleveland region are also included (Nielsen recognizes Akron and Canton as separate markets).

Currently, radio stations that primarily serve Greater Cleveland include:

=== AM ===
- 850 WKNR Cleveland (Sports - ESPN)
- 930 WNCR Elyria (Catholic - EWTN; WCCR simulcast)**
- 1000 WABQ Parma (Urban gospel) (Note: Daytime-only station)
- 1100 WTAM Cleveland (Talk/sports) (Note: Clear-channel station)
- 1220 WHKW Cleveland (Christian)
- 1260 WCCR Cleveland (Catholic - EWTN)**
- 1300 WJMO Cleveland (Spanish/Tropical)
- 1320 WOBL Oberlin (Classic country)
- 1330 WINT Willoughby (Conservative talk)
- 1350 WARF Akron (Sports - Fox/VSiN)
- 1380 WDLW Lorain (Oldies/Classic rock)
- 1420 WHK Cleveland (Conservative talk)
- 1460 WCCD Painesville (Urban gospel; WABQ simulcast)
- 1490 WERE Cleveland Heights (Talk/brokered)

=== FM ===
- 88.3 WBWC Berea (College/alternative; Baldwin Wallace University) (Note: Signal covers Cleveland and western suburbs)**
- 88.3 WHWN Painesville (Spanish/variety) (Note: Signal covers Lake County and eastern suburbs)**
- 88.7 WJCU University Heights (College/variety; John Carroll University)**
- 89.3 WCSB Cleveland (Jazz)**
- 89.7 WKSU Kent (NPR)**
- 90.3 WCLV Cleveland (Classical)**
- 91.1 WRUW-FM Cleveland (College/variety; Case Western Reserve University**
- 91.5 WKHR Bainbridge (Adult standards/MOR; Kenston High School) (Note: Signal covers Geauga County primarily)**
- 91.5 WOBC-FM Oberlin (College/variety; Oberlin College) (Note: Signal covers Lorain County primarily)**
- 92.3 WKRK-FM Cleveland Heights (Sports - Westwood One)
- 93.1 WZAK Cleveland (Urban adult contemporary)
- 95.5 WKLV-FM Cleveland (Christian contemporary - K-Love)**
- 96.5 WAKS Akron (Contemporary hits)
- 98.5 WNCX Cleveland (Classic rock)
- 99.5 WGAR-FM Cleveland (Country)
- 100.7 WMMS Cleveland (Active rock/hot talk)
- 102.1 WDOK Cleveland (Adult contemporary)
- 103.3 WCRF-FM Cleveland (Christian - Moody Radio)**
- 104.1 WQAL Cleveland (Hot adult contemporary)
- 104.9 WCPN Lorain (NPR; WKSU simulcast)**
- 105.7 WMJI Cleveland (Classic hits)
- 106.5 WHLK Cleveland (Adult hits)
- 107.3 WNWV Elyria (Alternative rock)
- 107.9 WENZ Cleveland (Mainstream urban)

=== LPFM ===
- 93.7 WSAV-LP Lorain (Community radio)**
- 95.9 WOVU-LP Cleveland (Community radio)**

(**) - indicates a non-commercial station.

=== Defunct ===
- KDPM—Cleveland (1921–1927)
- WATJ—Chardon (1969–2004)
- WBOE—Cleveland (1938–1978; license deleted in 1982)
- WDBK—Cleveland (1924–1927; moved to Akron as WFJC, consolidated to form WGAR in 1930)
- WJTB—North Ridgeville (1984–2017)
- WLAL—Lakewood (1948–1949)
- WWGK—Cleveland (1947–2021)
- WWIZ—Lorain (1958–1967)

=== Programming ===
- Wings Over Jordan (1937–1947; 1949)
- Rover's Morning Glory (2003–05; 2006–present)
- The Maxwell Show (2004–2009; 2010–2011)
- The Alan Cox Show (2010–present)
- Weekend Radio (1982–present)
- Cleveland Browns Radio Network (1946–1996; 1999–present)
- Cavaliers AudioVerse (1970–present)
- Cleveland Guardians Radio Network (1948–present)

== TV ==
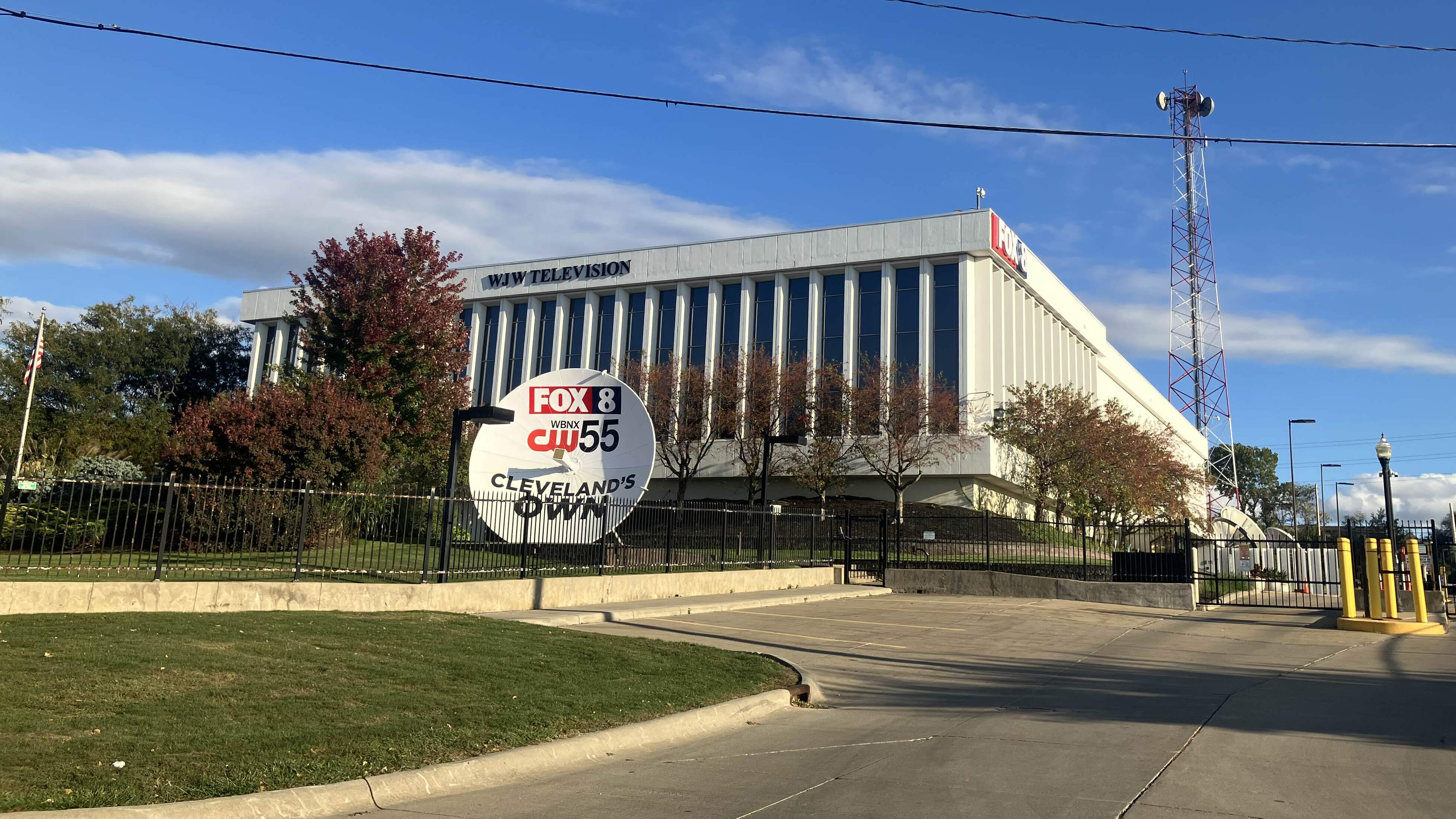
Studios for WJW and WBNX on Dick Goddard Way, northeast of downtown Cleveland

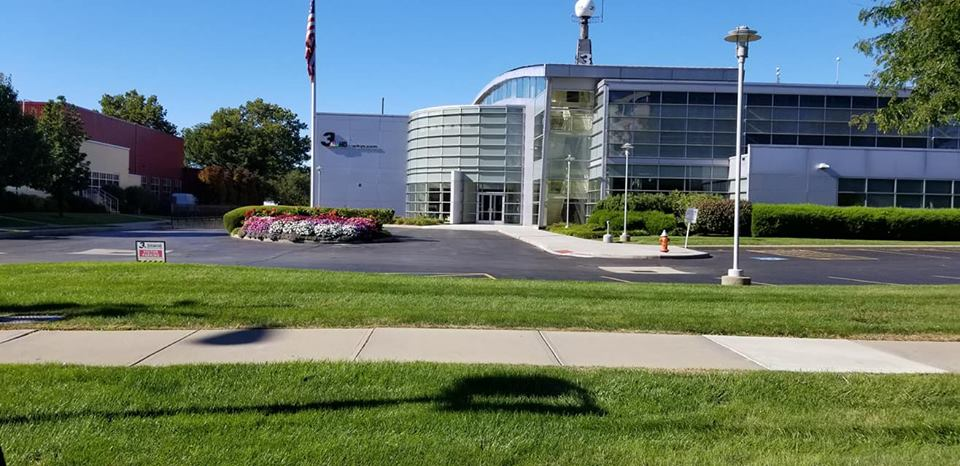
WKYC's studios in downtown Cleveland

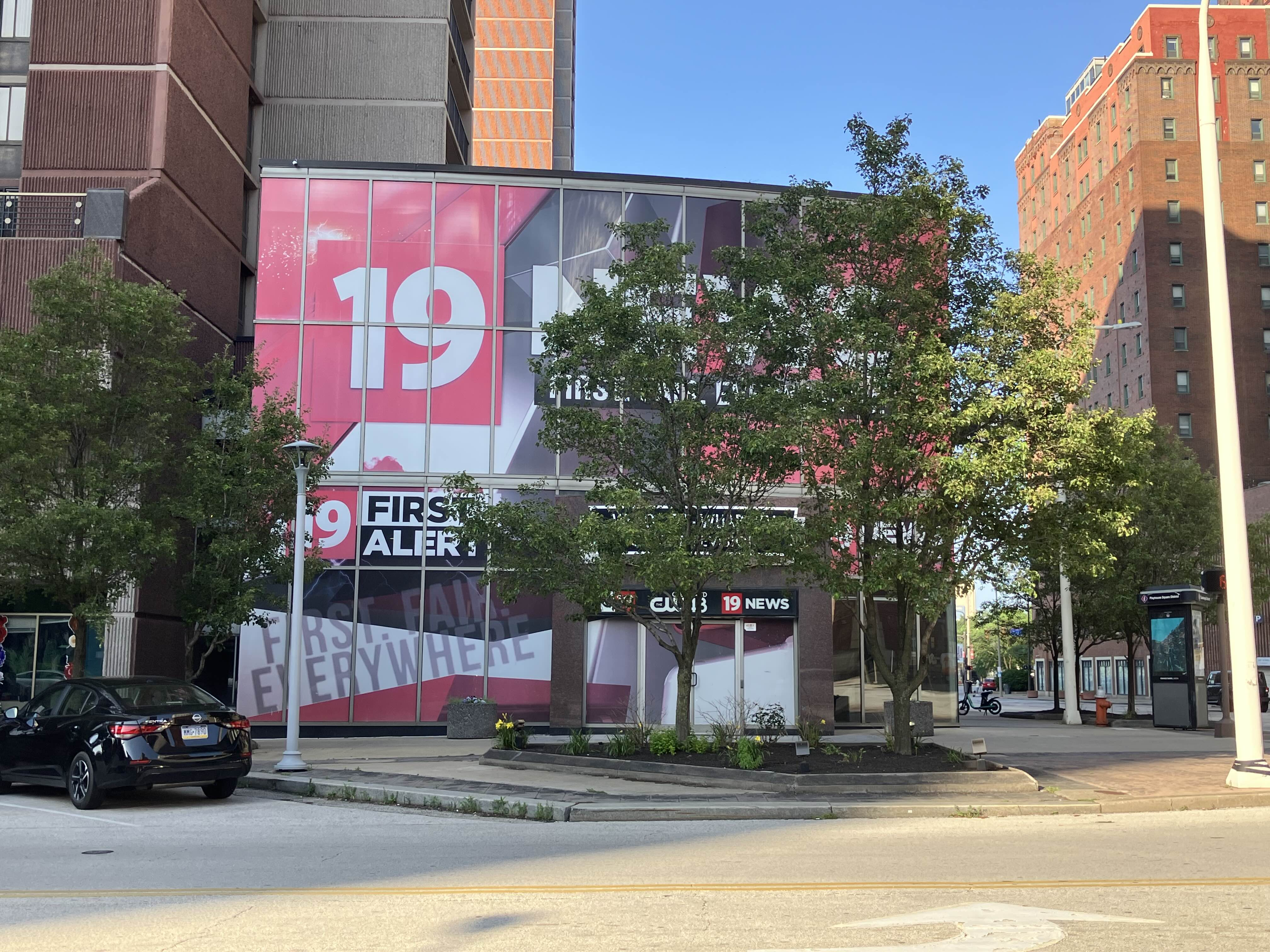
Studios for WOIO, WUAB, WTCL-LD and Rock Entertainment Sports Network, at Reserve Square in downtown Cleveland

Unlike radio, Cleveland, Akron, and Canton are grouped as a single television market, which is currently ranked by Nielsen Media Research as the 19th-largest television market in the United States. Cleveland was the first city in the U.S. to have all commercial television newscasts produced in high-definition; WJW was the first station to do in December 2004, followed by WKYC on May 22, 2006, WEWS on January 7, 2007, and WOIO/WUAB on October 20, 2007.

=== Full power ===
- 3 WKYC Cleveland (NBC)
- 5 WEWS-TV Cleveland (ABC)
- 8 WJW Cleveland (Fox)
- 17 WDLI-TV Canton (Bounce TV)
- 19 WOIO Shaker Heights (CBS)
- 23 WVPX-TV Akron (Ion Television)
- 25 WVIZ Cleveland (PBS)
- 43 WUAB Lorain (MyNetworkTV)
- 47 WRLM Canton (TCT)*
- 49 WEAO Akron (PBS)
- 55 WBNX-TV Akron (The CW)*
- 61 WQHS-DT Cleveland (Univision)*

=== Low-power ===
- 6 WTCL-LD Cleveland (Telemundo)
- 13 WIVX-LD Cleveland
- 16 WRAP-LD Cleveland
- 20 WQDI-LD Canton
- 22 WOHZ-CD Canton (Rock Entertainment Sports Network)*
- 26 WUEK-LD Canton
- 28 KONV-LD Canton
- 35 WOCV-CD Cleveland (Catchy Comedy)*
- 41 WEKA-LD Canton
- 53 WCDN-LD Cleveland (Daystar)*

(*) - indicates channel is a network owned-and-operated station.

=== Cable ===
- Guardians TV
- Spectrum News 1 (Ohio)

=== Defunct ===
- WAKN-LP—Akron (1990–2000)
- WAOH-LP—Akron (1990–2017)
- WICA-TV—Ashtabula (1953–1956; 1966–1967)
- WKBF-TV—Cleveland (1968–1975)
- FanDuel Sports Great Lakes (2006–2025)
- FanDuel Sports Ohio (1989–2026)
- Spectrum Sports (2006–2009)

=== Programming ===
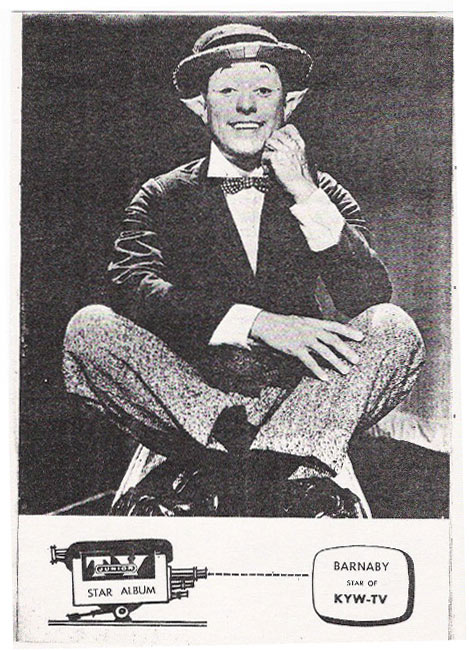
Barnaby, portrayed by Linn Sheldon

- The 90 & 9 Club (1985–2019)
- Barnaby (1957–1967, 1969–1990)
- Hickory Hideout (1981–1991)
- Hoolihan and Big Chuck/Big Chuck and Lil' John (1966–2007: new production, 2011–present: "Best of")
- Matches 'n Mates (1967–1968)
- Montage (1965–1978)
- Popeye Theater with Mister Mac (1968–1971)
- Shock Theater with Ghoulardi (1963–1966)
- The Ghoul (1971–1975, 1982–1984, 1998–2004)
- Supe's On/Mad Theater (Superhost) (1969–1989)
- The Captain Penny Show (1955–1971)
- The Mike Douglas Show (1961–1965)
- The Morning Exchange (1972–1999)
- Upbeat (1964–1971)
- Woodrow the Woodsman (1961–1972, 1997–2000)

== Internet ==
=== Publishing ===
- Belt Magazine
- Cleveland.com

=== Defunct ===
- oWOW Radio
