= WJTB =

WJTB may refer to:

- WJTB-FM, a radio station (95.3 FM) licensed to serve South Congaree, South Carolina, United States
- WJTB (AM), a defunct radio station (1040 AM) formerly licensed to serve North Ridgeville, Ohio, United States
