= Bibliography of Columbus, Ohio =

The following is a bibliography of Columbus, Ohio in the United States. It includes selected publications specifically about the city of Columbus, Franklin County, and the Columbus metropolitan area.

== History ==
List of works, arranged chronologically:

=== Published in the 19th century ===
==== 1800–1849 ====
- Jenkins, Warren (1841). "Columbus". The Ohio Gazetteer, and Traveller's Guide. Isaac N. Whiting. OCLC 191227275.
- The Columbus Business Directory. John R. Armstrong. 1843. OCLC 14115716.
- Directory of the City of Columbus. John Seibert. 1848. OCLC 28364384.

==== 1850–1899 ====
- Directory of the City of Columbus For The Years 1850–'51. E. Glover and Wm. Henderson. 1850. OCLC 42606807.
- Studer, Jacob Henry (1873). Columbus, Ohio: Its History, Resources, and Progress. J. H. Studer. OCLC 193331.
- Lee, Alfred Emory (1892). History of the City of Columbus, Capital of Ohio. Munsell & Company. OCLC 1029853937.
- Art Work of Columbus: Published in Nine Parts. The W. H. Parish Publishing Co. 1897. OCLC 2459420.

=== Published in the 20th century ===
==== 1900–1949 ====
- Columbus, Ohio, 1900. Columbus Railway Company. 1900. OCLC 4747615. OL 6988717M.
- A Centennial Biographical History of The City of Columbus and Franklin County, Ohio. The Lewis Pub. Co. 1901. OCLC 6613992.
- Franklin County at The Beginning of The Twentieth Century. Historical Publishing Company. 1901.
- Taylor, William Alexander (1909). Centennial History of Columbus and Franklin County, Ohio. The S. J. Clarke Publishing Co. ISBN 9780832828300.
- "Columbus (Ohio)" . Encyclopædia Britannica. Vol. 6 (11th ed.). 1910. pp. 746–747.
- Columbus "The Capital City" Newspaper Reference Book. Pen and Pencil Club. 1915.
- Hooper, Osman Castle (1920). History of the City of Columbus, Ohio: From the Founding of Franklinton in 1797, Through the World War Period, to the Year 1920. The Memorial Publishing Company. OCLC 1014386002.
- Roderick Duncan McKenzie (1921–1922). "The Neighborhood: A Study of Local Life in the City of Columbus, Ohio". American Journal of Sociology. 27 (2): 145–168. doi:10.1086/213301. S2CID 144681917. part 2, part 3
- Moore, Opha (1930). History of Franklin County, Ohio. Historical Publishing Company.
- Federal Writers' Project employees (1940). "Columbus". The Ohio Guide. American Guide Series (3rd ed.). Oxford University Press. p. 246. ISBN 9781603540346.
- J. S. Himes, Jr. (1942). "Forty Years of Negro Life in Columbus, Ohio". Journal of Negro History. 27 (2): 133–154. doi:10.2307/2714730. JSTOR 2714730. S2CID 149546155.

==== 1950–1999 ====
- James E. Wert (1956). "Small Business Promoters--A Case Study of Columbus, Ohio". Journal of Industrial Economics. 5 (1): 44–50. doi:10.2307/2097513. JSTOR 2097513.
- Henry L. Hunker, Industrial Evolution of Columbus, Ohio (Columbus: Bureau of Business Research, College of Commerce and Administration, Ohio State University, 1958)
- Jon A. Peterson (1965). "From Social Settlement to Social Agency: Settlement Work in Columbus, Ohio, 1898–1958". Social Service Review. 39 (2): 191–208. doi:10.1086/641739. JSTOR 30017591. S2CID 143963893.
- Arter, Bill, Columbus Vignettes, Columbus: Nida-Eckstein Printing, Inc., Vol. 1(1966), Vol. 2 (1967); Vol.3 (1969); Vol. 4 (1971).
- Samuelson, Robert E.; et al. (Pasquale C. Grado, Judith L. Kitchen, Jeffrey T. Darbee) (1976). Architecture: Columbus. The Foundation of The Columbus Chapter of The American Institute of Architects. OCLC 2697928.
- Garrett, Betty; Lentz, Edward R. (1980). Columbus, America's Crossroads. Continental Heritage Press. ISBN 0932986102.
- Ory Mazar Nergal, ed. (1980). "Columbus, OH". Encyclopedia of American Cities. New York: E.P. Dutton. OL 4120668M.
- Craig Rimmerman (1985). "Citizen Participation and Policy Implementation in the Columbus, Ohio CDBG Program". Public Administration Quarterly. 9 (3): 328–341. JSTOR 40861102.
- Franken, Harry (1991). Columbus: The Discovery City. Windsor Publications. p. 22. ISBN 0-89781-397-9.
- George Thomas Kurian (1994). "Columbus, Ohio". World Encyclopedia of Cities. Vol. 1: North America. Santa Barbara, Calif.: ABC-CLIO. OL 1431653M – via Open Library.

=== Published in the 21st century ===
==== 2000–2009 ====
- Hunker, Henry L. (2000). Columbus, Ohio: A Personal Geography. Ohio State University Press. ISBN 9780814208571.
- Cole, Charles Chester (2001). A Fragile Capital: Identity and the Early Years of Columbus, Ohio. Ohio State University Press. ISBN 9780814208533.
- Darbee, Jeffrey (2003). Taking the Cars: A History of Columbus Union Station. Columbus: The Ohio Historical Society. ISBN 0-9742573-0-3.
- Lentz, Ed (2003). Columbus: The Story of a City. The Making of America Series. Arcadia Publishing. ISBN 9780738524290. OCLC 52740866.
- Yvette M. Alex-Assensoh (2004). "Taking the Sanctuary to the Streets: Religion, Race, and Community Development in Columbus, Ohio". Annals of the American Academy of Political and Social Science. 594: 79–91. doi:10.1177/0002716204264781. JSTOR 4127695. S2CID 145330315.
- Barrett, Richard E. (April 26, 2006). Columbus 1860-1910. ISBN 9780738539621.
- Darbee, Jeffrey T.; Recchie, Nancy A. (2008). The AIA Guide to Columbus. Ohio University Press. ISBN 9780821416846.
- Strobel, Christoph (2008). The Testing Grounds of Modern Empire: The Making of Colonial Racial Order in the American Ohio Country and the South African Eastern Cape, 1770s–1850s. Peter Lang. ISBN 978-1-4331-0123-6.
- Winter, Chester C. (2009). A Concise History of Columbus, Ohio and Franklin County. Xlibris. ISBN 9781436333818. OCLC 312463573.

==== 2010–present ====
- Dunham, Tom (2010). Columbus's Industrial Communities: Olentangy, Milo-Grogan, Steelton. AuthorHouse. ISBN 9781452059709. OCLC 665197718.
- Lentz, Ed (2011). Historic Columbus: A Bicentennial History. Historical Publishing Network.
- Hunter, Bob (2012). A Historical Guidebook to Old Columbus: Finding the Past in the Present in Ohio's Capital City. Athens, Ohio: Ohio University Press. ISBN 978-0821420126. OCLC 886535510.
- Fallows, James; Fallows, Deborah (eds.). "[Multiple titles]". The Atlantic. City Makers: American Futures. Archived from the original on March 9, 2016.
- Columbus Landmarks Foundation, African American Settlements and Communities in Columbus, Ohio: A Report, Columbus: 2014.
- Blackford, Mansel. G., Columbus, Ohio: Two Centuries of Business and Environmental Change. Columbus: Trillium, Ohio State University Press, 2016.
- Cox, Kevin R. (2021). Boomtown Columbus: Ohio's Sunbelt City and How Developers Got Their Way. Ohio State University Press.

== Other topics ==
- Tootle, James R. (2003). Baseball in Columbus. Arcadia Publishing. OCLC 51851584.
- Darbee, Jeffrey T.; Recchie, Nancy A. (2005). German Columbus. Arcadia Publishing. OCLC 60492513.
- Henderson, Andrew (2003). Forgotten Columbus. Arcadia Publishing. OCLC 1333018394.
- Lehosit, Sean V. (2015). West Columbus. Arcadia Publishing. OCLC 967393510.
- Barrett, Richard E. (2012). Aviation in Columbus. Arcadia Publishing. OCLC 885207618.
- Dominianni, Andy; Dominianni, Erin (2011). Columbus Italians. Arcadia Publishing. OCLC 706018753.
- Adams, Michael H. (2016). Columbus Radio. Arcadia Publishing. OCLC 965127225.
- Schneck, Ken; McClelland, Shane (2019). LGBTQ Columbus. Arcadia Publishing. OCLC 1111406632.
- Meyers, David (2008). Columbus: The Musical Crossroads. Arcadia Publishing. OCLC 225874802.
- Barrett, Richard E. (2005). Columbus: 1860–1910. Arcadia Publishing. OCLC 68710941.
- Barrett, Richard E. (2006). Columbus: 1910–1970. Arcadia Publishing. OCLC 71586666.
- Kampmann, Nellie (2011). A Haunted History of Columbus, Ohio. Arcadia Publishing. OCLC 713834656.
- Betti, Tom; Uhas Sauer, Doreen (2013). On This Day in Columbus, Ohio History. Arcadia Publishing. OCLC 893903845.
- Betti, Tom; Uhas Sauer, Doreen. Historic Hotels of Columbus, Ohio. Arcadia Publishing. OCLC 913768379.
- Meyers, David; Walker, Elise Meyers (2015). Wicked Columbus, Ohio. Arcadia Publishing. OCLC 913768381.
- Tebben, Alex (2017). Prohibition in Columbus, Ohio. Arcadia Publishing. OCLC 1132365901.
- Motz, Doug; Hayes, Christine (2015). Lost Restaurants of Columbus, Ohio. Arcadia Publishing. OCLC 922456027.
- Cook, Renee Casteel (2016). The Columbus Food Truck Cookbook. Arcadia Publishing. OCLC 1132401169.
- Garrepy, Mike (2019). Columbus Motor Speedway. Arcadia Publishing. OCLC 1048945212.
- Ellison, Jim (2020). Columbus Pizza: A Slice of History. Arcadia Publishing. OCLC 1204138254.
- Betti, Tom; Uhas Sauer, Doreen (2021). Forgotten Landmarks of Columbus. The History Press. ISBN 9781467143677.
- Kampmann, Nellie (2021). Murder & Mayhem in Columbus, Ohio. Arcadia Publishing. OCLC 1276860432.
- Hayes, Christine; Motz, Doug (2017). Lost Restaurants of Central Ohio & Columbus. Arcadia Publishing. OCLC 1132349188.
- Barrett, Richard E. (2002). Columbus, Ohio 1898–1950 in Vintage Postcards. Arcadia Publishing. OCLC 416252678.
- Meyers, David; Walker, Elise Meyers (2010). Historic Columbus Crimes. Arcadia Publishing. OCLC 667874455.
- Graichen, Jody (2010). Remembering German Village: Columbus, Ohio's Historic Treasure. Arcadia Publishing. OCLC 613507981.
- Meyers, David; Walker, Elise Meyers; Chenault, Jeff; Motz, Doug (2014). Kahiki Supper Club. Arcadia Publishing. OCLC 1202476847.
- Hinds, Conrade C. (2012). The Great Columbus Experiment of 1908: Waterworks That Changed The World. Arcadia Publishing. OCLC 808244980.
- Scheiber, Curtis (2017). Columbus Beer: Recent Brewing & Deep Roots. Arcadia Publishing. OCLC 1011114436.
- Meyers, David; Walker, Elise Meyers; Vollmer, Nyla (2017). Carrying Coal to Columbus: Mining in the Hocking Valley. Arcadia Publishing. ISBN 9781625858122.
- Uhas Sauer, Doreen; Koblentz, Stuart J. (2009). The Ohio State University Neighborhoods. Arcadia Publishing. OCLC 317925946.
- Mount Calvary Cemetery. Arcadia Publishing.
- Upper Arlington. Arcadia Publishing.
- Around Worthington. Arcadia Publishing.
- Railroad Depots of Central Ohio. Arcadia Publishing.
- Clintonville and Beechwold. Arcadia Publishing.
- Clark, John M. (2015). German Village Stories Behind the Bricks. The History Press. ISBN 9781467117760. OCLC 907885358.
- Golf in Columbus at Wyandot Country Club. Arcadia Publishing.
- The Ohio State University District. Arcadia Publishing.
- The Professor & the Coed. Arcadia Publishing.
- Meyers, David; Meyers, Beverly; Walker, Elise Meyers (2011). Look to Lazarus: The Big Store. Arcadia Publishing. OCLC 745980001.
- Betti, Tom; Uhas Sauer, Doreen; Lentz, Ed (2013). Columbus Neighborhoods. Arcadia Publishing. OCLC 944953950.
- Betti, Tom; Uhas Sauer, Doreen (2012). Historic Columbus Taverns. Arcadia Publishing. OCLC 788250808.
- Columbus and the Great Flood of 1913. Arcadia Publishing.
- Inside the Ohio Penitentiary. Arcadia Publishing.
- Bexley. Arcadia Publishing.
- Whitehall. Arcadia Publishing.
- James Garfield and the Civil War. Arcadia Publishing.
- Columbus and the State of Ohio. Arcadia Publishing.
- Central Ohio Legends & Lore. Arcadia Publishing.
- The Valley Dale Ballroom. Arcadia Publishing.
- Ohio State University Student Life in the 1960s. Arcadia Publishing.
- Short North Neighborhood. Arcadia Publishing.
- Meyers, David; Walker, Elise Meyers; Chenault, Jeff; Motz, Doug (2023). The Kahiki Scrapbook: Relics of Ohio's Lost Tiki Palace. The History Press. OCLC 1347019392.

== See also ==
- History of Columbus, Ohio
- Mass media in Columbus, Ohio
- Timeline of Columbus, Ohio
