= Al-Sahafa =

Al-Sahafa may refer to:

- Al-Sahafa (United States)
- Al-Sahafa (Sudan)
