= WPSE =

Radio station in Erie, Pennsylvania

Coordinates: 42°08′11″N 80°02′25″W

Joe Martin
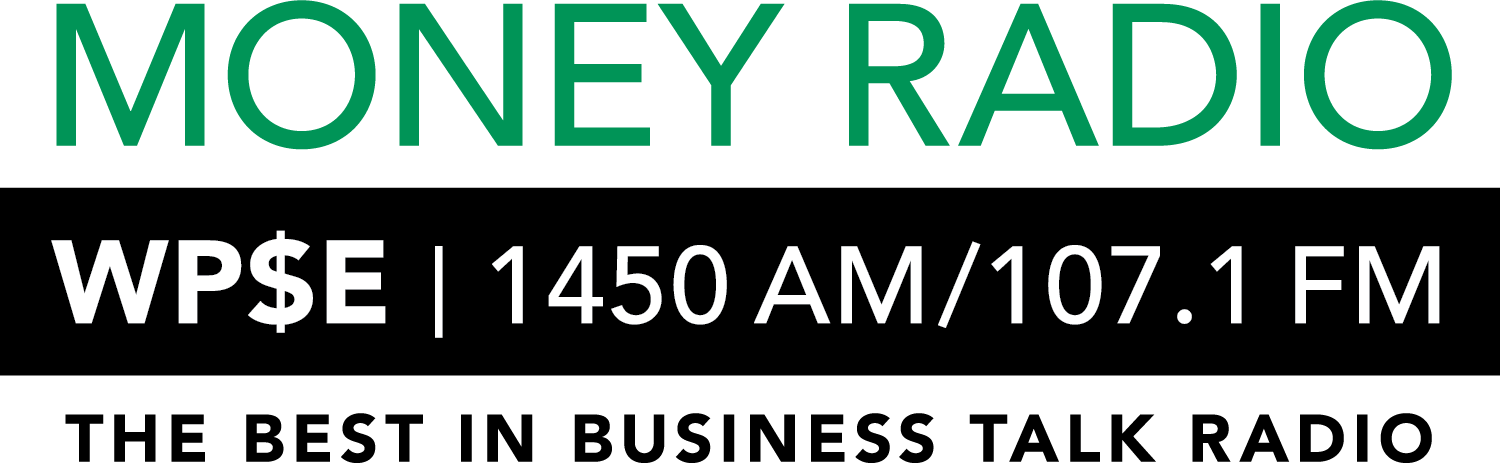
- Erie, Pennsylvania; United States
- Frequency: 1450 kHz
- Branding: Money Radio, WPSE

Programming
- Format: Business news/talk
- Affiliations: Bloomberg Radio; FOX News Radio; Worldwide News Network; Westwood One; Penn State football; Pittsburgh Steelers

Ownership
- Owner: Penn State Behrend; (The Board of Trustees of the Pennsylvania State University)

History
- Call sign meaning: "Penn State Erie"

Technical information
- Licensing authority: FCC
- Facility ID: 65467
- Class: C
- Power: 1,000 watts day; 770 watts night
- ERP: FM: 250 watts
- Translator: 107.1 W296BW (Erie)

Links
- Public license information: Martin Public file; LMS
- Webcast: Listen live
- Website: wpse.psu.edu

WPSE (stylized as WP$E) (AM 1450/FM 107.1) is a commercial radio station serving the Erie, Pennsylvania area with a programming emphasis on Business/News/Talk. It is owned by the Board of Trustees at Penn State University and its studio is located on the campus of Penn State Behrend in Erie.
