= Timeline of Columbus, Ohio =

City history timeline

The following is a timeline of the history of the city of Columbus, Ohio, United States.

== 18th century ==
- 1797: Lucas Sullivant founds Franklinton, Central Ohio's first permanent white settlement and the oldest Columbus neighborhood.

== 19th century ==
- 1803
  - Ohio becomes the first state formed from the Northwest Territory.
  - Franklin County is formed from Ross County.
- 1805: Postal service is established in Franklinton, and the settlement acquires its first preacher.
- 1806: The first schoolhouse is built, a 16-foot-square log building.
- 1811: The first church is constructed, by the present-day Old Franklinton Cemetery.
- 1812
  - Columbus is founded.
  - Population: 300.
  - Foundations for High Street laid out.
- 1813: Columbus's first post office is established.
- 1814
  - William Ludlow is named "director of the town of Columbus" to supervise its construction.
  - The first market house, later known as Central Market, is constructed.
  - The first newspaper is established, The Western Intelligencer, after it moves from Worthington.
- 1816
  - Columbus becomes the capitol of Ohio and the legislature meets in Columbus's first statehouse.
  - The Village of Columbus is organized, with Jarvis W. Pike elected as the first mayor.
- 1817
  - James Monroe visits Columbus, the first U.S. President to do so.
  - The Ohio State Library is headquartered in Columbus.
- 1824: The seat of Franklin County moves from Franklinton to Columbus.
- 1826: The first public schools are opened in Columbus and Franklinton.
- 1831: Columbus is connected to the Ohio and Erie Canal through the Columbus Feeder Canal.
- 1832: The Ohio School for the Deaf is established.
- 1833
  - National Road in operation.
  - A cholera epidemic kills 100 residents and causes 1,000 to move away.
- 1834
  - Columbus chartered as a city, population: 3,500.
  - John Brooks becomes mayor.
  - Ohio Penitentiary begins operating.
- 1837: Ohio State School for the Blind established.
- 1840: Population: 6,048.
- 1845: Columbus Public Schools established.
- 1849
  - State Convention of the Colored Citizen held in city.
  - Green Lawn Cemetery established.
- 1850
  - The Columbus and Xenia Railroad begins operating, and the first passenger train arrives in the city.
  - Development of Franklin Park began.
  - Population: 17,882.
- 1851
  - Cleveland, Columbus and Cincinnati Railroad begins operating.
  - Union Station operates from 1851 to 1977.
- 1853
  - Saint Patrick Church founded.
  - Columbus Athenaeum founded.
- 1857: The Ohio Statehouse opens to the public and begins use.
- 1861
  - Ohio Statehouse fully completed.
  - Camp Chase is established (1861).
- 1862: Fort Hayes is established.
- 1865: Abraham Lincoln's funeral procession stops in Columbus.
- 1868
  - St. Mary's of the Springs school opens.
  - Cleveland, Columbus, Cincinnati and Indianapolis Railway in operation.
- 1870
  - Columbus annexes 4,052 acres (1,640 ha), including Franklinton.
  - The Ohio State University is founded, as the Ohio Agricultural and Mechanical College.
  - Columbus Circulating Library organized.
- 1871
  - The Daily Dispatch newspaper begins publication.
  - Public water system first set-up.
  - Population: 32,000.
- 1872: Public Library & Reading Room established at Columbus City Hall.
- 1873: The Ohio Agricultural and Mechanical College opens.
- 1874: The Ohio State Fair is permanently established in Columbus, after being held in cities throughout the state each year.
- 1875: Union Station rebuilt.
- 1878
  - St. Joseph Cathedral building completed.
  - Columbus Gallery of Fine Arts and Ohio State University Marching Band established.
- 1879: Columbus Art School and Camp Chase Confederate Cemetery established.
- 1880: Population: 51,647.
- 1887: Franklin County Courthouse built.
- 1890: Population: 88,150.
- 1894: "Ugly law" approved.
- 1895: Franklin Park Conservatory opens.
- 1898: First Neighborhood Guild organized.
- 1899
  - Columbus Citizen newspaper begins publication.
  - Masonic Temple built.
  - Hocking Valley Railway operates from 1899 to 1930.
- 1900
  - Godman Guild House built.
  - Population: 125,560.

== 20th century ==
- 1903: Columbus, Delaware and Marion Railway operated 1903 to 1933.
- 1904: Governor's Mansion and Franklin County Memorial Hall built.
- 1905: Indianola Park (amusement park) in business.
- 1906: Columbus Public Library building constructed.
- 1910
  - Streetcar strike.
  - Population: 181,511.
- 1912: Woman Suffrage parade takes place.
- 1913: The Great Flood of 1913
- 1914: The Columbus City Charter is adopted.
- 1917: Women are granted the right to vote in municipal elections.
- 1919: The Spring Street YMCA opens.
- 1920
  - Planning begins for buildings in the Columbus Civic Center.
  - Population: 237,031.
- 1922: Ohio State University's Ohio Stadium built.
- 1924: Central High School is completed, the first building completed in the new Columbus Civic Center.
- 1927: The American Insurance Union Citadel is completed, becoming the fifth-tallest building in the world at the time.
- 1928
  - Columbus City Hall is completed, replacing the Old City Hall destroyed by fire in 1921.
  - Ohio Theatre opens.
- 1929
  - The present-day John Glenn Columbus International Airport is established.
  - Battelle Memorial Institute founded.
- 1933: Ohio State Office Building constructed.
- 1934: U.S. Post Office and Courthouse built.
- 1936: White Castle restaurant chain headquartered in city.
- 1937: Spanish–American War Memorial dedicated.
- 1940: Population: 306,087.
- 1947: National Auto Theatre (drive-in cinema) in business.
- 1952: Ohio State University's Mershon Center for International Security Studies established.
- 1954: Black Baptist Pastors' Conference organized (approximate date).
- 1954-1958: Columbus annexes numerous parcels, growing from 40 sq mi (100 km^{2}) to 84.9 sq mi (220 km^{2}).
- 1955
  - Franklin Heights High School founded.
  - Columbus begins planning its interstate highways along with state and federal agencies.
  - Sister city relationship established with Genoa, Italy.
- 1959: The Columbus Citizen-Journal newspaper in publication.
- 1960: Population: 471,316.
- 1964
  - Northland Mall in business.
  - Bank One Tower built.
- 1969: First Wendy's founded by Dave Thomas.
- 1970
  - Columbus Free Press begins publication.
  - Columbus surpasses Cincinnati in population.
- 1974: Rhodes State Office Tower built.
- 1975: Columbus Monthly magazine begins publication.
- 1976
  - Fort Hayes Metropolitan Education Center established.
  - Union Station demolished.
- 1977
  - QUBE television begins broadcasting.
  - One Nationwide Plaza built.
  - Clippers begin playing in Columbus.
- 1978: Community Development Task Force formed.
- 1980: Sister city relationship established with Tainan City, Taiwan.
- 1982: Columbus surpasses Cleveland to become the largest city by population in Ohio.
- 1984
  - Huntington Center built.
  - Ohio Penitentiary closes.
- 1985: Contemporary American Theatre Company founded.
- 1987
  - King Arts Complex active.
  - Union Station mural painted.
- 1988
  - Vern Riffe State Office Tower and Three Nationwide Plaza built.
  - Sister city relationships established with Hefei, China; Odense, Denmark; and Seville, Spain.
- 1989: Columbus City Center (shopping mall) in business.
- 1990
  - The Other Paper begins publication.
  - William Green Building constructed.
  - Population: 632,910.
- 1991
  - City government computer network begins operating.
  - Carriage Place Movies 12 (cinema) in business.
- 1992: Sister city relationship established with Dresden, Germany.
- 1996
  - Columbus Crew begins play with the newly established Major League Soccer.
  - Sister city relationship established with Herzliya, Israel.
  - Chamber of Commerce city portal online.
- 1998: City government website online (approximate date).
- 1999
  - The Columbus Crew moves to newly-built Columbus Crew Stadium.
  - Easton Town Center opens.
  - Columbus Ohio Temple built.
- 2000
  - Michael B. Coleman begins his first term as mayor of Columbus.
  - Nationwide Arena opens, hosting the newly founded Columbus Blue Jackets.
  - Population: 711,470.

== 21st century ==
- 2001
  - Columbus Underground begins publication.
  - Miranova Condominiums built.
  - Arena Grand cinema and Polaris Fashion Place (shopping mall) in business.
- 2004: The Northland Mall on Morse Road, which closed in 2002, is demolished to make way for a new commercial development, ultimately to be called Northland Village.
- 2008: Sister city relationship established with Ahmedabad, India.
- 2009: Huntington Park opens in the Arena District, replacing Cooper Stadium as the home of Columbus Clippers baseball.
- 2010
  - Population: 787,033.
  - Columbus City Center demolished.
- 2011
  - Columbus Commons opens.
  - Steve Stivers becomes U.S. representative for Ohio's 15th congressional district.
- 2013
  - Population: 822,553.
  - Joyce Beatty becomes U.S. representative for Ohio's 3rd congressional district.
- 2014: Sister city relationship established with Curitiba, Brazil.
- 2016
  - Columbus surpasses Indianapolis to become the second largest city in the Midwest.
  - Andrew Ginther begins his first term as mayor.
- 2018: Columbus surpasses San Francisco to become the 14th-largest city in America.
- 2020
  - The COVID-19 pandemic is introduced to Columbus.
  - George Floyd protests take place in Columbus and most major U.S. cities.
  - Population 905,748.
- 2021: Lower.com Field, the new Columbus Crew stadium, opens.
- 2023:Columbus Crew wins its third MLS Cup, its second in four years.

== See also ==
- Bibliography of Columbus, Ohio
- History of Columbus, Ohio
- List of mayors of Columbus, Ohio

Other cities in Ohio

- Timeline of Cincinnati
- Timeline of Cleveland
- Timeline of Toledo, Ohio
