= WNZN =

- Lorain, Ohio; United States
- Broadcast area: Lorain County; Erie County; Huron County
- Frequency: 89.1 MHz
- Branding: Power 89.1 WNZN

Programming
- Language: English
- Format: Urban gospel
- Affiliations: Cleveland Browns Radio Network; Cavaliers AudioVerse

Ownership
- Owner: Pace Foundation

History
- First air date: March 21, 1990

Technical information
- Licensing authority: FCC
- Facility ID: 66384
- Class: A
- ERP: 2,200 watts
- HAAT: 114 meters (374 ft)
- Transmitter coordinates: 41°18′34.00″N 82°26′31.00″W

Links
- Public license information: Public file; LMS
- Webcast: Listen live
- Website: www.wnzn.org

WNZN (89.1 FM) – branded Power 89.1 WNZN – is a non-commercial urban gospel radio station licensed to Lorain, Ohio, serving Lorain County, Erie County and Huron County. The WNZN studios are located off of Kansas Avenue in the city's eastern side, while the station's transmitter site currently sits in Berlin Heights.

Prior to October 2014, WNZN broadcast during limited hours on weekdays, and featured a Spanish/variety format. The station was in the process of being sold to the Pace Foundation and on November 1, 2014, WNZN changed to an Urban Gospel format branded as Power 89.1. The sale to Pace Foundation, at a price of $280,000, was consummated on November 26, 2014.

== Play by Play ==
WNZN is the Spanish language outlet for the Cleveland Browns of the National Football League (NFL), and the Cleveland Cavaliers of the National Basketball Association (NBA).
