= Bibliography of Cleveland =

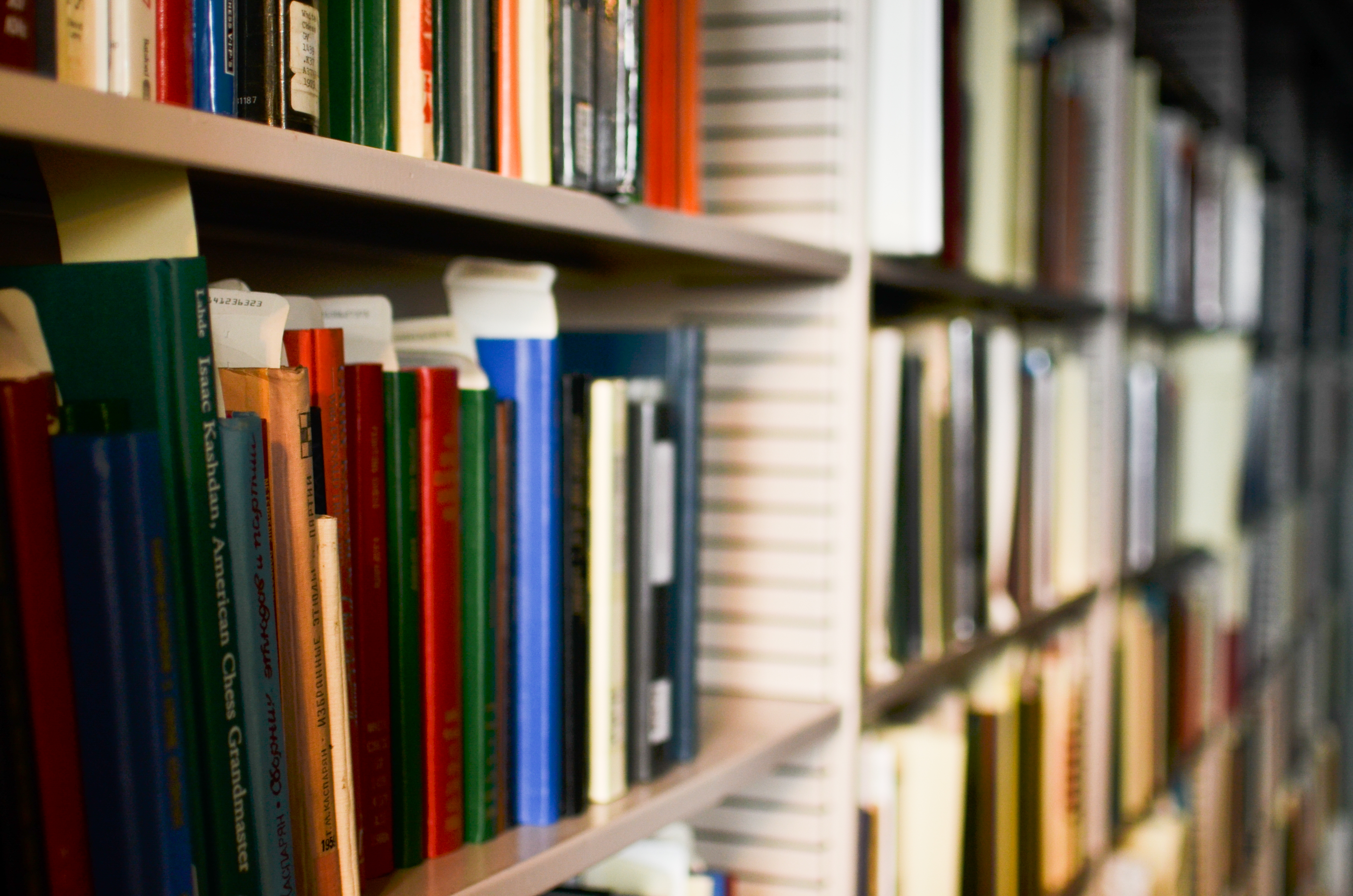
Bookshelf at the Cleveland Public Library's John G. White Special Collection

The following is a bibliography of Cleveland, Ohio. It includes selected publications specifically about the city, Cuyahoga County, and the Greater Cleveland Metropolitan Area.

== Nonfiction ==
=== History ===
==== List of works, arranged chronologically ====
===== Published in the 19th century =====
- Directory Cleveland and Ohio City for the years 1837-38, Cleveland: Sanford & Lott, 1837, OCLC 889007, OL 24143535M
- Whittlesey, Charles (1867). Early History of Cleveland, Ohio. Cleveland: Fairbanks, Benedict & Co.
- J.J. Clark (1872), Cleveland city guide, Cleveland: Clark & Lawler, OL 23288908M
- "Cleveland", Appleton's Illustrated Hand-Book of American Cities, New York: D. Appleton and Company, 1876
- Kennedy, James Harrison (1896). History of the City of Cleveland. Cleveland: Imperial Press.
- Urann, Clara A. (1896). Centennial history of Cleveland. Cleveland: J.B. Savage.

===== Published in the 20th century =====
- Street directory and electric railway guide of Cleveland and suburbs, Cleveland: Whitworth Bros. Co., 1904, OL 22894570M
- Orth, Samuel Peter. A History of Cleveland, Ohio: Biographical. Vol. 2 (SJ Clarke Publishing Company, 1910). online
- Edward Hungerford (1913), "Sixth City", The Personality of American Cities, New York: McBride, Nast & Company
- Elroy McKendree Avery (1918). A History of Cleveland and Its Environs: the Heart of New Connecticut. 3 volumes. Chicago, IL: Lewis Publishing Company.
- Cleveland. Vol. 1 (Special limited ed.). Chicago: The Lewis Publishing Company. 1918.
- Cleveland. Vol. 2 (Special limited ed.). Chicago: The Lewis Publishing Company. 1918.
- James Wallen (1920). Cleveland's golden story, a chronicle of hearts that hoped, minds that planned and hands that toiled, to make a city "great and glorious". William Taylor Son & Co.
- Auburn, William H., and Miriam R. Auburn. 1933. This Cleveland of Ours. Cleveland: S.J. Clarke Publishing Co.
- Federal Writers’ Project (1940). "Cleveland". Ohio Guide. American Guide Series. New York: Oxford University Press. p. 216+. OL 537761W.
- Condon, George E. (1967). Cleveland: The Best Kept Secret. New York: Doubleday.
- Condon, George E. (1976). Yesterday's Cleveland. Miami: E.A. Seemann. ISBN 0-912458-73-9.
- Condon, George E. (1979). Cleveland: Prodigy of the Western Reserve. Tulsa: Continental Heritage Press. ISBN 9780932986061. online
- Ory Mazar Nergal, ed. (1980), "Cleveland", Encyclopedia of American Cities, New York: E.P. Dutton, OL 4120668M
- Jedick, Peter (1980). Cleveland: Where the East Coast Meets the Midwest. Cleveland: Cleveland Magazine.
- Chapman, Edmund H. (1981). Cleveland: Village to Metropolis. Cleveland: Western Reserve Historical Society. ISBN 9780911704297.
- Van Tassel, David; Grabowski, John J. (1986). Cleveland: A Tradition of Reform. Kent, OH: Kent State University Press.
- Campbell, Thomas F.; Miggins, Edward M. (1988). The Birth of Modern Cleveland, 1865-1930. Cleveland: Western Reserve Historical Society. ISBN 9780911704365.
- Whelan, Ned (1989). Cleveland: Shaping the Vision, a Contemporary Portrait. Chatsworth, CA: Windsor Publications. ISBN 9780897813204.
- Rose, William Ganson (1990). Cleveland: The Making of a City (2nd ed.). Kent, OH: Kent State University Press. ISBN 9780873384285.
- Whatever Happened to the "Paper Rex" Man? and Other Stories of Cleveland's Near West Side. Cleveland: The May Dugan Center and Gray & Company. 1993. ISBN 9780963076014.
- Keating, W. Dennis; Krumholz, Norman; Perry, David C. (1995). Cleveland: A Metropolitan Reader. Kent, OH: Kent State University Press. ISBN 9780873384926.
- Morton, Marion (1995). Women In Cleveland: An Illustrated History. Bloomington, Indiana: Indiana University Press. doi:10.2979/WomeninCleveland – via Big Ten Open Books.
- Van Tassel, David, and John Grabowski, eds. Encyclopedia of Cleveland History (1996).
- Miller, Carol Poh; Wheeler, Robert A. (1997). Cleveland: A Concise History, 1796–1996 (2nd ed.). Bloomington: Indiana University Press. ISBN 9780253211477.

===== Published in the 21st century =====
- Grabowski, John J.; Grabowski, Diane Ewart (2000). Cleveland: A History in Motion. Carlsbad, CA: Heritage Media. ISBN 1-886483-38-8.
- Jenkins, William D. "Before Downtown Cleveland, Ohio, and Urban Renewal, 1949-1958." Journal of Urban History 27.4 (2001): 471–496.
- Tuennerman-Kaplan, Laura. Helping others, helping ourselves: Power, giving, and community identity in Cleveland, Ohio, 1880-1930 (Kent State University Press, 2001).
- Morton, Marian J. (2002). Cleveland Heights: The Making of An Urban Suburb. Charleston: Arcadia Publishing. ISBN 0738523844.
- Gallo Becker, Thea (2003). Lakewood. Charleston: Arcadia Publishing. ISBN 073852333X.
- Gallo Becker, Thea (2004). Cleveland, 1796–1929. Charleston: Arcadia Publishing. ISBN 0738532673.
- Gallo Becker, Thea (2005). Cleveland, 1930–2000. Charleston: Arcadia Publishing. ISBN 0738533769.
- Lamoreaux, Naomi R., Margaret Levenstein, and Kenneth L. Sokoloff. "Financing invention during the second industrial revolution: Cleveland, Ohio, 1870-1920." (No. w10923. National Bureau of Economic Research, 2004). online
- Pfingsten, Ralph A. (2004). From Rockport to West Park. Cleveland: John Marshall High School Alumni Association. ISBN 0-9759618-0-2.
- Spangler, James R.; Toman, James A. (2005). Cleveland and Its Streetcars. Charleston: Arcadia Publishing. ISBN 978-0738539676.
- Keating, Dennis, Norman Krumholz, and Ann Marie Wieland. "Cleveland's Lakefront: Its Development and Planning." Journal of Planning History 4#2 (2005): 129–154.
- Condon, George E. (2006). West of the Cuyahoga. Kent, OH: Kent State University Press. ISBN 0-87338-854-2.
- Gregor, Sharon E. (2010). Rockefeller's Cleveland. Charleston: Arcadia Publishing.
- Cetina, Judith G. (2011). Cuyahoga County: The First 200 Years. Charleston: Arcadia Publishing. ISBN 978-0738583464.
- Ruminski, Dan; Dutka, Alan F. (2012). Cleveland in the Gilded Age: A Stroll Down Millionaires' Row. Charleston: The History Press. ISBN 978-1609498788.
- Albrecht, Brian; Banks, James (2015). Cleveland in World War II. Charleston: The History Press. ISBN 978-1626198821.
- Grabowski, John J. (2019). Cleveland A to Z: An Essential Compendium for Visitors and Residents Alike. Kent, OH: Kent State University Press. ISBN 978-1606353905.
- Crissman, Dan; Tachovsky, Evan; Wilson, David (2019). Cleveland in 50 Maps. Cleveland: Belt Publishing. ISBN 978-1948742559.

=== Landmarks ===
- Campen, Richard N. (1971). Architecture of the Western Reserve, 1800–1900. Cleveland and London: The Press of Case Western Reserve University. ISBN 978-0829501964.
- Cigliano, Jan (1991). Showplace of America: Cleveland's Euclid Avenue, 1850–1910. Kent, OH: Kent State University Press. ISBN 0-87338-445-8.
- Deegan, Gregory G.; Toman, James A. (1999). The Heart of Cleveland: Public Square in the 20th Century. Cleveland: Cleveland Landmarks Press. ISBN 978-0936760124.
- DeMarco, Laura (2017). Lost Cleveland. London: Pavilion. ISBN 9781911595151.
- DeNobel Love, Jeannine (2020). Cleveland Architecture 1890–1930: Building the City Beautiful. East Lansing, Michigan: Michigan State University Press. ISBN 978-1611863499.
- Ellis, Lloyd R. (2012). A Guide to Greater Cleveland's Sacred Landmarks. Kent, OH: Kent State University Press. ISBN 978-1606351215.
- Harwood, Jr., Herbert H. (2003). Invisible Giants: The Empires of Cleveland's Van Sweringen Brothers. Bloomington and Indianapolis: Indiana University Press. ISBN 0-253-34163-9.
- Herrick, Claydate (1987). Cleveland Landmarks. Cleveland: Cleveland Restoration Society. ISBN 9789996188725.
- Johannesen, Eric (1979). Cleveland Architecture, 1876-1976. Cleveland: Western Reserve Historical. ISBN 9780911704211.
- Johannesen, Eric (1999). A Cleveland Legacy: The Architecture of Walker and Weeks. Kent, OH: Kent State University Press. ISBN 0-87338-589-6.
- Karberg, Richard E.; Toman, James A. (2002). Euclid Avenue: Cleveland's Sophisticated Lady. Cleveland: Cleveland Landmarks Press. ISBN 0936760192.
- Lawrence, Michael (1980). Make No Little Plans. Cleveland: Western Reserve Historical Society. ISBN 0-911704-24-8.
- Pacini, Lauren R. (2019). Honoring Their Memory: Levi T. Scofield, Cleveland's Monumental Architect and Sculptor. Cleveland: Artography Press. ISBN 978-0-578-48036-7.
- Rarick, Holly M. (1986). Progressive Vision: The Planning of Downtown Cleveland 1903-1930. Cleveland and Bloomington: The Cleveland Museum of Art and Indiana University Press. ISBN 9780910386869.
- Toman, Jim; Cook, Dan (1981). Cleveland Landmarks Series, Vol. I: The Terminal Tower Complex, 1930-1980. Cleveland: Cleveland Landmarks Press. ISBN 0-936760-01-X.
- Toman, Jim; Cook, Dan (1981). Cleveland Landmarks Series, Vol. II: Cleveland Municipal Stadium. Cleveland: Cleveland Landmarks Press. ISBN 0-936760-02-8.
- Toman, Jim; Cook, Dan (1984). Cleveland Landmarks Series, Vol. III: Cleveland's Changing Skyline. Cleveland: Cleveland Landmarks Press. ISBN 0-936760-03-6.
- Toman, James A.; Cook, Daniel J. (2005). Cleveland's Towering Treasure: A Landmark Turns 75. Cleveland: Cleveland Landmarks Press. ISBN 0-936760-20-6.

=== Culture ===
- The Blue book of Cleveland and vicinity : a social directory and ladies' visiting and shopping guide, including the prominent families in all the principal towns of northern Ohio (1922)
- Adams, Deanna R. (2010). Cleveland's Rock and Roll Roots. Charleston: Arcadia Publishing. ISBN 978-1531651497.
- Adams, Henry; Waldman, Lawrence (2011). Out of the Kokoon. Cleveland: Cleveland Public Library and Cleveland Artists Foundation. ISBN 9780615534008.
- Cramer, C. H. (1972). Open Shelves and Open Minds: A History of the Cleveland Public Library. Cleveland: The Press of Case Western Reserve University. ISBN 978-082950219-0 – via Internet Archive.
- Dutka, Alan F. (2020). Christmas in Cleveland. Charleston: The History Press. ISBN 978-1540245397.
- Dutka, Alan F. (2012). Cleveland's Short Vincent: The Theatrical Grill and its Notorious Neighbors. Cleveland: Cleveland Landmarks Press. ISBN 9780936760322.
- Dutka, Alan F. (2011). East Fourth Street: The Rise, Decline, and Rebirth of an Urban Cleveland Street. Cleveland: Cleveland Landmarks Press. ISBN 9780936760308.
- Dutka, Alan F. (2016). Historic Movie Theaters of Downtown Cleveland. Charleston: History Press Library. ISBN 9781540203540.
- Faircloth, Christopher (2009). Cleveland's Department Stores. Charleston: Arcadia Publishing.
- Gorman, John; Feran, Tom (2008). The Buzzard: Inside the Glory Days of WMMS and Cleveland Rock Radio--A Memoir. Cleveland: Gray & Company. ISBN 978-1598510515.
- Kehoe, Wayne (2007). Cleveland's University Circle. Charleston: Arcadia Publishing.
- Mosbrook, Joe (2013). Cleveland Jazz History (2nd ed.). Cleveland: Cleveland State University. ISBN 9781936323418.
- Mote, Patricia M. (2006). Cleveland's Playhouse Square. Charleston: Arcadia Publishing. ISBN 978-1531624057.
- Rosenberg, Donald (2000). Second to None: The Cleveland Orchestra Story. Cleveland: Gray & Company. ISBN 978-188622824-5.
- Turner, Evan H. (1991). Object Lessons: Cleveland Creates an Art Museum. Cleveland: Cleveland Museum of Art. ISBN 0-940717-08-5.
- Leedy, Jr., Walter C. (1991). Cleveland Builds an Art Museum. Cleveland: Cleveland Museum of Art. ISBN 0-940717-09-3.
- Wittke, Carl (1966). The First Fifty Years: The Cleveland Museum of Art, 1916–1966. Cleveland: John Huntington Art and Polytechnic Trust and the Cleveland Museum of Art.

=== Ethnicity ===
- Peoples of Cleveland. Cleveland: Western Reserve Historical Society. 2001. ISBN 9780911704532.
- Barton, Josef J. (1975). Peasants and Strangers: Italians, Rumanians, and Slovaks in an American City, 1890-1950. Harvard Studies in Urban History. Harvard University Press. ISBN 0674659309.
- Dutka, Alan F. (2014). AsiaTown Cleveland: From Tong Wars to Dim Sum. Charleston: The History Press.
- Dutka, Alan F. (2017). Slovenians in Cleveland: A History. Charleston: The History Press.
- Gartner, Lloyd P. (1987). History of the Jews of Cleveland (2nd ed.). Cleveland: Western Reserve Historical Society. ISBN 0911704396.
- Hammack, David C.; Grabowski, Diane L.; Grabowski, John J. (2002). Identity, Conflict, & Cooperation: Central Europeans in Cleveland, 1850–1930. Cleveland: Western Reserve Historical Society. ISBN 978-0911704556.
- Kukral, Michael A. "Czech Settlements in 19th Century Cleveland, Ohio." East European Quarterly 38.4 (2004): 473.
- Kusmer, Kenneth L. (1978). A Ghetto Takes Shape: Black Cleveland, 1870-1930. Urbana and Chicago: University of Illinois Press. ISBN 978-0252006906.
- Lederer, Clara (1954). Their Paths are Peace: The Story of Cleveland's Cultural Gardens. Cleveland: Cleveland Cultural Garden Federation.
- Lewis, Joanne M.; Szilagyi, John (1981). From Market to Market, An Old Fashioned Family Story: The West Side Market. Cleveland Heights, OH: Elandon Books. ISBN 0-937424-12-9.
- Michney, Todd M. (2017). Surrogate Suburbs: Black Upward Mobility and Neighborhood Change in Cleveland, 1900–1980. Chapel Hill: University of North Carolina Press. ISBN 978-1469631943.
- Myers, John; Cetina, Judith G. (2015). Irish Cleveland. Charleston: Arcadia Publishing.
- Papp, Susan M. Hungarian Americans and Their Communities in Cleveland (1981) Complete text online
- Sabol, John T.; Alzo, Lisa A. (2009). Cleveland Czechs. Charleston: Arcadia Publishing.
- Sabol, John T.; Alzo, Lisa A. (2009). Cleveland Slovaks. Charleston: Arcadia Publishing.
- Veronesi, Gene P. Italian-Americans & Their Communities of Cleveland (1977) Complete text online

=== Politics ===
- Seven Making History: A Mayoral Retrospective. Cleveland: The League of Women Voters of Cleveland and the Western Reserve Historical Society. 1990.
- Cunningham, Randy. Democratizing Cleveland : the rise and fall of community organizing in Cleveland, Ohio, 1975-1985 (2007) online
- Gleisser, Marcus (1965). The World of Cyrus Eaton. New York and London: A.S. Barnes and Co., Inc. and Thomas Yoseloff Ltd.
- Holli, Melvin G., and Jones, Peter d'A., eds. Biographical Dictionary of American Mayors, 1820-1980 (Greenwood Press, 1981) short scholarly biographies each of the city's mayors 1820 to 1980. online; see index at p. 408 for list.
- Horner, William T. (2010). Ohio's Kingmaker: Mark Hanna, Man and Myth. Athens, OH: Ohio University Press. ISBN 978-0-8214-1894-9.
- Kucinich, Dennis (2021). The Division of Light and Power. Cleveland: Finney Avenue Books. ISBN 978-1638772347.
- Moore, Leonard N. (2003). Carl B. Stokes and the Rise of Black Political Power. Urbana and Chicago: University of Illinois Press. ISBN 978-0252071638.
- Odenkirk, James E. (2005). Frank J. Lausche: Ohio's Great Political Maverick. Wilmington, OH: Orange Frazer Press.
- Miggins, Edward M. "A City of Uplifting Influences: From Sweet Charity to Modern Social Welfare and Philanthropy." In The Birth of Modern Cleveland, 1865-1930, edited by Thomas F. Campbell and Edward M. Miggins, (Western Reserve Historical Society, 1988) pp 141–71.
- Robenalt, James (2018). Ballots and Bullets: Black Power Politics and Urban Guerrilla Warfare in 1968 Cleveland. Chicago: Lawrence Hill Books. ISBN 978-1641603119.
- Stokes, Carl B. (1973). Promises of Power: A Political Autobiography. New York: Simon and Schuster. ISBN 978-067121602-3 – via Internet Archive.
- Stradling, David; Stradling, Richard (2015). Where the River Burned: Carl Stokes and the Struggle to Save Cleveland. Ithaca, NY: Cornell University Press. ISBN 9780801453618.
- Swanstrom, Todd (1985). The Crisis of Growth Politics: Cleveland, Kucinich, and the Challenge of Urban Populism. Philadelphia: Temple University Press. ISBN 9780877223665.

==== Mayor Tom Johnson ====
- Bremner, Robert H. "The Civic Revival in Ohio: Reformed Businessman: Tom L. Johnson." American Journal of Economics and Sociology 8.3 (1949): 299-309.
- DeMatteo, Arthur E. "The Downfall of a Progressive: Mayor Tom L. Johnson and the Cleveland Streetcar Strike of 1908." Ohio History 104 (1995): 24-41.
- Johnson, Tom L.. My Story. B. W. Huebsch, 1911; reprint Kent State University Press 1993. Text also online at the Cleveland Memory Project.
- Lough, Alexandra W. "Tom L. Johnson and Cleveland Traction Wars, 1901–1909." American Journal of Economics and Sociology 75.1 (2016): 149-192.
- Megery, Michael. "Ideological Origins of a Radical Democrat: The Early Political Thought of Tom L. Johnson, 1888–1895." Middle West Review 6.1 (2019): 37-61.
- Murdock, Eugene C. Tom Johnson of Cleveland (Wright State University Press, 1994), a standard scholarly biography.
- Suit, William Wilson. "Tom Loftin Johnson, businessman reformer' (PhD dissertation, Kent State University ProQuest Dissertations Publishing, 1988. 8827177).
- Warner, Hoyt Landon. Progressivism in Ohio, 1897-1917 (Ohio State University Press, 1964).
- Whitehair, Andrew L., "Tom L. Johnson’s Tax School: the Fight For Democracy And Control of Cleveland’s Tax Machinery" (2020). (ETD Archive. 1190. online

== See also ==
- List of mass media in Cleveland
