= Bob Hunter (Ohio sportswriter) =

Robert E. (Bob) Hunter is a sports columnist for The Columbus Dispatch. He became a sportswriter for the Ohio newspaper in 1975, after working at The Journal-News of Hamilton, Ohio from 1972-75. He became a columnist at the Dispatch in 1993.

He is the author of Thurberville, a 2017 book about writer James Thurber and his hometown of Columbus, Ohio; Saint Woody, The History and Fanatcism of Ohio State Football (2012), A Historical Guidebook to Old Columbus, Finding the Past in the Present in Ohio's Capital City (2012), Chic (2008) and Buckeye Basketball (1981) and is listed as co-author with Wilbur Snypp in an updated edition of The Buckeyes, A Story of Ohio State Football (1982). He has also authored three children's titles: The Signal-Callers, Great Pro Running Backs, and Baseball's Best Sluggers (all 1979). He joined the Baseball Writers' Association of America in 1983 and served as secretary of the Cincinnati chapter of the BBWAA from 1993 to 2016. He has also been a member of the Board of Trustees of the Columbus Historical Society since 2011. He is a native of Hamilton, Ohio, and is a graduate of Ohio University. In a Columbus Dispatch article on November 13, 2000 he criticized the "curious system" that somehow landed Bill Belichick another head coaching position during his first season with the Patriots.
