= Design World =

- Editorial Director: Paul Heney
- Staff writers: Leslie Langnau, Miles Budimir, Mike Santora, Lisa Eitel, Mary Gannon, Lee Teschler
- Categories: Design, engineering
- Frequency: Monthly
- Circulation: 40,000 BPA Audited
- Publisher: Mike Emich, Scott Mccaffery
- First issue: October 2006
- Company: WTWH Media LLC
- Country: United States
- Based in: Cleveland, Ohio
- Language: English
- Website: designworldonline.com
- ISSN: 1941-7217

Design World is a U.S. trade magazine headquartered in Cleveland, Ohio with print and online issues covering topics in the field of OEM design engineering. Design World also publishes special issues and handbooks on related topics such as motion control, bearings, sensors, packaging, semiconductors, machine tools, energy, fluid power and robotics.

Design World publishes twelve print editions annually that are sent to a BPA-audited circulation of 40,000 OEM design engineers. The digital version of the magazine is sent monthly to 100,000 subscribers.

== History ==
Design World is owned and managed by a publishing company, WTWH Media, originally headquartered in Middleburg Heights, Ohio. The initial editorial team was established on September 1, 2006, with the first issue being published in October 2006.

In 2007, Design World created an issue named Leadership in Engineering, that is published annually in January. This issue nominates inventors, specific departments, and companies exemplifying leadership in the engineering field.

== Awards and honors ==
In 2008 and 2009, Design World was selected as a winner in the APEX Awards for Publication Excellence for best new design and layout.

In 2009, Design World won an ASBPF Regional Design Award for business circulations under 80,000.
