= Greater Cleveland Food Bank =

Food bank in Cleveland, Ohio

- Formation: 1979; 47 years ago
- Merger of: Food Rescue of Northeast Ohio (2001)
- Type: Nonprofit food bank
- Tax ID no.: 34-1292848
- Registration no.: 501(c)(3)
- Purpose: Hunger relief
- Region served: Cuyahoga, Ashtabula, Geauga, Lake, Ashland, and Richland counties
- President & CEO: Kristin Warzocha
- Board of directors: Joseph DiRocco (Chair)
- Affiliations: Feeding America
- Website: greaterclevelandfoodbank.org

The Greater Cleveland Food Bank is the largest hunger relief organization in Northeast Ohio, US.

== History ==
The Cleveland Foodbank started in 1979.

In 2001, the Foodbank merged with Food Rescue of Northeast Ohio.

In 2006, America's Second Harvest named Cleveland Foodbank as its Member of the Year out of 220 affiliate food banks.

The Food Bank opened a 200,000-square-foot partner distribution hub in 2022.

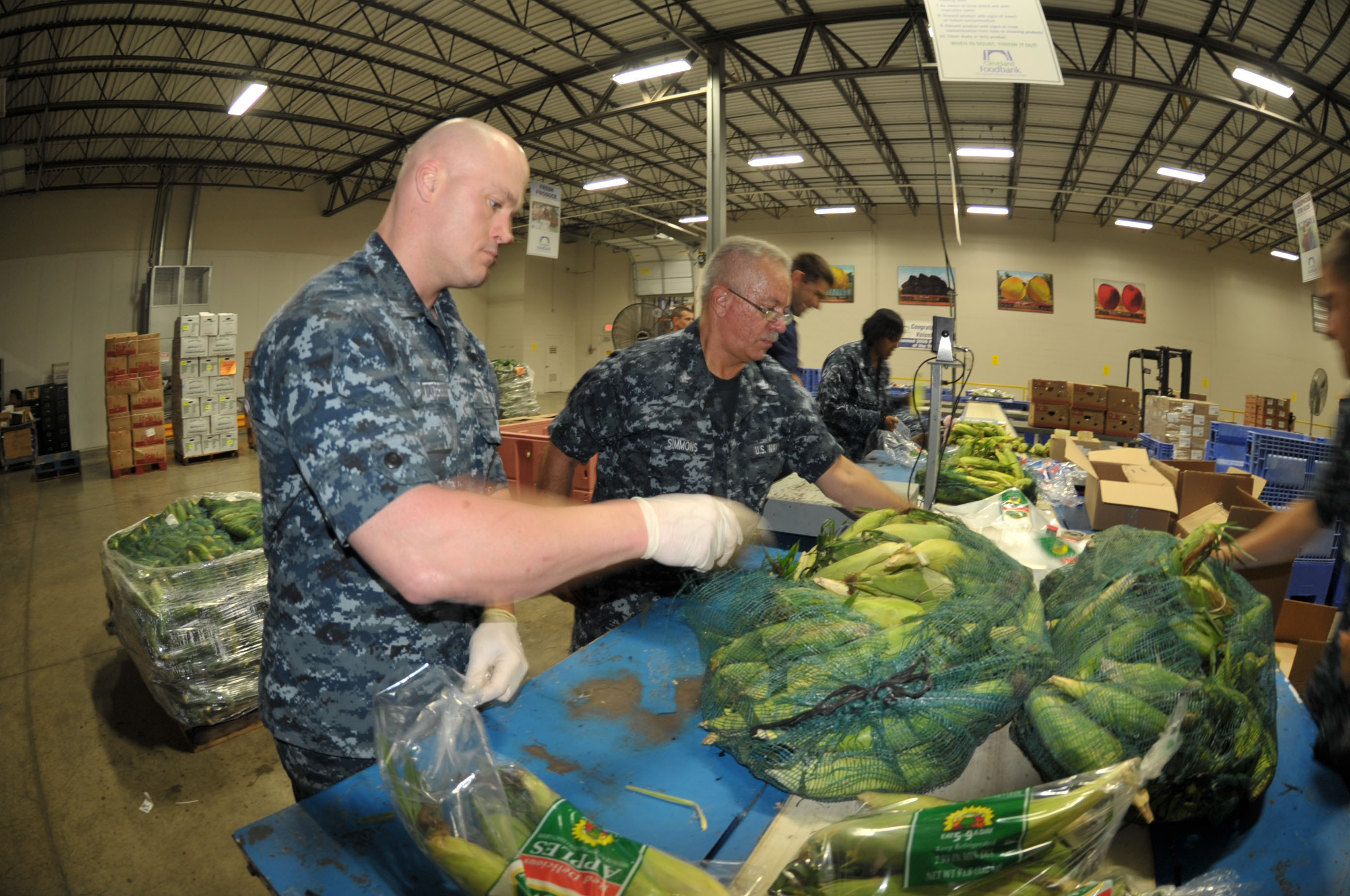
Sailors volunteer packing produce at Cleveland Food Bank during the Navy's commemoration of the Bicentennial of the War of 1812 in Cleveland.

In 2023, 424,000 people were served by the Food Bank in Cuyahoga, Ashtabula, Geauga, Lake, Ashland, and Richland counties.

== Programs ==
Greater Cleveland Food Bank has a network of more than 1,000 food pantries.

Greater Cleveland Food Bank teaches cooking classes to people running hot meal programs.

The annual Harvest for Hunger campaign helps support food distribution throughout the year.
