= WLAL =

Radio station in Lakewood, Ohio (1948–1949)

- Lakewood, Ohio; United States
- Frequency: 104.9 MHz

Ownership
- Owner: United Garage and Service Corp.; (Arthur B. McBride)

History
- First air date: May 14, 1948
- Last air date: December 1, 1949

Technical information
- ERP: 1,000 watts
- HAAT: 108.2 meters (355 ft)
- Transmitter coordinates: 41°28′36.765″N 81°47′54.535″W

WLAL was a radio station licensed to Lakewood, Ohio, United States, that was one of the earliest FM stations in Cleveland, operating at 104.9 FM. Controlled by businessman and Cleveland Browns founding owner Arthur B. McBride, the station broadcast from May 1948 to December 1949, folding due to the early commercial struggles of the FM band. WLAL's studios and transmitter were located in Lakewood.

== History ==
The station was established by McBride under his taxicab business United Garage and Service Corp., which had a monopoly in Cleveland, Akron and Canton; McBride also had ownership interests in a wire news service for horse racing and sizable real estate holdings in both Cleveland and Florida. Through United Garage, McBride filed for a construction permit for an FM station licensed to Lakewood; by January 1947, United Garage also purchased WINK radio in Fort Myers, Florida, with McBride associate Daniel Sherby holding a minority stake. United Garage sought the FM permit alongside Radio Lakewood, Inc. until both combined their bids, with McBride having 81 percent ownership. The Federal Communications Commission (FCC) issued the permit to United Garage on November 1, 1947, which followed twelve permits for FM stations being jointly granted by the FCC months earlier.

Taking the WLAL call sign, United Garage sought to operate it as a Lakewood station, with studios and transmitter on Madison Avenue in Lakewood on property McBride already owned. The transmitter required approval from the Civil Aeronautics Administration and the Civilian Production Administration due to Lakewood being within a six-mile (9.7 km) radius of Cleveland Airport. The station planned a May 1948 sign-on by that March, with Lloyd Chatterton, former director of the Cleveland Police's radio system, as station manager; Chatterton promised to carry youth-oriented programming, cover local events and have a potential alliance with the Lakewood Schools. WLAL successfully took to the air on May 14, 1948, with an opening ceremony and address by Lakewood mayor Amos Kauffman.

Cleveland Press radio critic Stan Anderson reported that during testing phases, the station was receivable throughout much of Cleveland including the East Side. WLAL had a full-service radio format of community programs and recorded music, with an on- and off-air staff of 13 people, broadcasting from 8 a.m. to midnight every day. This programming was characteristic of early independent FM stations that had no network affiliation. Owing to McBride's ownership of the Cleveland Browns, WLAL simulcast WGAR's Browns radio coverage with Bob Neal and Bill Mayer beginning with the 1948 season and continuing through the 1949 season. Its 355-foot (108 m) tower had beacons visible to boaters off the Lake Erie shoreline.

United Garage announced WLAL would suspend operations on December 1, 1949, pending FCC approval. Chatterton cited financial reasons for the closure, telling the Press, "we have been forced reluctantly Into the conclusion that such an operation is economically unsound". The shutdown portended difficulties for standalone FM stations; by March 1950, Scripps-Howard folded WEWS-FM and National Association of Broadcasters president Justin Miller predicted other FM stations, particularly in smaller markets, were likely to cease operation. WBOE and WCUO-FM remained as standalone FM stations, calling into question the viability of FM in the radio industry. Plain Dealer critic George E. Condon surmised that FM simply came into existence at the wrong time and was overtaken with the arrival of television. WEWS-FM's demise itself was largely attributed to the success of WEWS-TV, which came on the air at the same time.

The former studio building was put up for sale and purchased in December 1950 by the Society for Crippled Children as a treatment facility. The 104.9 FM frequency would not be reused in the Cleveland market until 1975, when WZLE in Lorain, Ohio, signed on.
