= Cleveland Cripple Survey =

The Cleveland Cripple Survey or Survey of Cripples in Cleveland was a survey done in Cleveland, Ohio first published in 1918 report by the Welfare Federation of Cleveland entitled: "Education and Occupations of cripples Juvenile and Adults: A Survey of All Cripples of Cleveland, Ohio, 1916". The two reporters/authors for this Survey and report were Lucy Wright and Amy M. Hamburger. This survey is often credited as being one of the first accurate disability censuses, that measured the social and economic conditions of individuals considered.

== Purpose and context ==
Many reports regarding this survey state that the purpose of the survey was to reveal the needs, constraints, and general conditions of the disability community within Cleveland. It was also revealed that the basis of the survey, which began its works in 1915, was formulated around various questions, one of which was: "What, then does the cripple want?". From this question the two authors undertook this project with aspiration to not only discover the true nature and size of the problems disabled individuals within the community faced but also to create feasible community based plan that would: "promote the welfare of cripples".

Within the survey, a "cripple" is defined "as a person whose muscular movements are so far restricted by congenital defect, results of disease or accidents as to affect his capacity for self-support.". Individuals classified as blind or with cardiac problem were excluded from this definition.

The Cleveland area was chosen as the sample for this survey due to the fact that it provided a booming industrial community that was majorly affected by two historical events. The first event was the early implementations of Workmen's Compensation and Employer's Liability Act. Disabled workers during this time period often faced discrimination by employers that often feared that hiring disabled laborers would increase their insurance rates and increase their own liability for providing workers compensation benefits. The next historical event was the early spread of Poliomyelitis or the Polio Virus, which in densely populated cities such as Cleveland was rapidly infecting numerous laborers children, thus creating adding to the number of disabled individuals. Wounded Veterans returning from World War I also added to these newly classified disabled individuals. Because of this rapid increase of disabled individuals the survey uncovered over 60 percent of individuals they deemed disabled by their definition were in fact not documented as so by their local ordinances.

== Research methods ==
Common to the Progressive Era, Social Survey was used as the method to collect information. Work for the survey began on October 17, 1915, and was completed August 19, 1916 . Data for this survey was obtained by canvassing eight districts of the city with house-to house-visits, scheduled questions, and survey cards. The initial process began for the survey was done by amateur volunteer workers, students, and some experienced social workers that canvassed the eight districts with "lists of cripples" provided to them by hospitals, dispensaries and social agencies (24). A total of 150,000 families from all economic backgrounds were canvassed within the survey. Out of that number 4,186 were given survey cards that were compiled within a 12-month span. The estimated total cost for the survey was reported at $12,500.

== Results ==
The survey uncovered a variety of findings from the series of questions that families were asked to answer on a survey card. These suggested that disabled individuals had discovered ways to stay economically successful despite societal constraints and lack of government assistance. In addition, the survey established a greater need for disabled child assistance programs and institutions. More dependent disabled children as well

The population and age demographics revealed that nearly half of the individuals that were classified as "crippled", became disabled before the age of 15. 43 percent became classified during active working years (ages 15–60) while only 6 percent became classified after age 60. Out of the 936 cases that identified as becoming disabled at childhood, 382 were attributed to the Polio Virus (Infantile Paralysis). These results confirmed the severity of virus's epidemic and suggested that preventive measure should be taken to limit the illness from spreading further.

Overall the survey suggested that within Cleveland in 1916 out of every 100 individuals, six of them were classified as "crippled" according to their definition. Out of these individuals 65 percent were completely unaware that they could potentially utilize free public food dispensaries or social agencies.

== Recommendations ==
The Welfare Federation of Cleveland recommendations based on this survey included the implantation of long-term rehabilitation and vocational programs, promotion of economic employment inclusion, and preventive efforts to reduce the number of individuals becoming disabled from accidents and diseases. They also recommended special federal institution be made for the severely disabled that "cannot place themselves". While though whom they classified as capable of work be provided more employment opportunities based on their skill sets. Additional the committee also encouraged the census to change qualification for all physically disabled individuals regardless of their defined economic class.

== Influence on policy ==
The survey results may have influenced many types of disability social policies throughout the 1920s and 1930s. A news article from the Washington Post, dated September 3, 1930, reported that the study had been presented in a White House Conference on Child Health and Project. The same year as the "Education and Occupations of Cripples Juvenile and Adults: A Survey of All Cripples of Cleveland, Ohio, 1916," the Smith Sears Veterans Rehabilitation Act became law, helping integrate disabled veterans back into the work force. This act was the first piece of legislation that promoted any kind of disability rehabilitation and closely coincides with the recommendations from the survey's committee. The survey may also have contributed to discrimination within immigration procedures, reporting that districts with high percentages of immigrants typically had more disabled individuals present. The committee added in their recommendation that "preventive measures" should be taken to prevent "American" people from becoming classified as disabled.

== Criticism ==
The Ugly Laws: Disability Politics by Susan M. Schweiks (2009) heavily criticizes many aspects of "The Cleveland survey" including its rhetoric, rehabilitation approach, as well as the publications discourse that arguable speaks for its subjects. Schweiks suggests that in the report's section "successful individuals", subjects are not only spoken for by the surveyors but also given identities such as "beggar", "street operator", or even just a survey number.

Halle Lewis also heavily criticized the survey's contents in her dissertation Cripples are not the Dependent One is Led to think. According to her, the survey itself "made disabled Clevelanders a separate class of people", and subsequently creating a new disabled identity. Although she does in fact credit the survey for the advancement of some disabled individuals during that time period that were provided with better educational, medical, and vocational programs because of the survey's result, she also suggests that becoming identified as "crippled" gave them an identity associated with inferiority and therefore robbed them of an individual identity
