= Al-Sahafa (United States) =

Newspaper in Cleveland, Ohio

Al-Sahafa Newspaper
- Type: Monthly newspaper
- Format: Broadsheet
- Owner: Fatina Salaheddine
- Editor: Fatina Salaheddine
- Founded: 2000
- Headquarters: Cleveland, Ohio
- Circulation: 15,000 Monthly (Nationally & Internationally)
- Website: www.Al-Sahafa.us

Al-Sahafa was Ohio's only statewide Arab-American newspaper. It operated with the goal of unraveling the misconceptions around Arabs and dispelling prejudice. Its aim of "exposing issues that are seldom, if ever, discussed on American network and cable outlets" makes it the first paper in Ohio to portray issues of interest to Arab Americans. Written in a neutral tone, it strives to avoid taking political sides and instead focuses on providing context for Arab politics as well as cultural tradition. Al-Sahafa which means "the media" or "the reporter" in Arabic.

== History and ownership ==
Fatina Salaheddine, an American of Lebanese descent, is the owner and publisher of Al-Sahafa.

Al-Sahafa is a tabloid size newspaper. It is published on the first Tuesday of every month, and is also available online. In addition to editing, Salaheddine is the founder and CEO. Al-Sahafa is the first of its kind, providing readers with a scope of Arab-American events, news, cultural highlights, featured editorials and an Arab perspective on politics. It is published in the English language.

In the beginning, Al-Sahafa's target audience was Arab Americans, but September 11 brought the curiosity of all communities that wanted to know more about Arabs and the Middle East.

Since the launch of Al-Sahafa, it has grown to a statewide distribution.

Each month 150,000 copies of the Al-Sahafa Newspaper are strategically placed all over the state of Ohio in downtown city hall and government buildings, grade and high schools, colleges, libraries, news stations, hospitals, law firms, bakeries, hotels, airports, restaurants and coffee shops. There is also a large subscription base of close to 15,000 that are mailed outside the state of Ohio each month as well, to all embassies, politically important locations in Washington D.C., nationally recognized colleges, Arab American organizations and companies doing business with the Middle East.

== Community involvement ==
Al-Sahafa partnered with a number of universities including Ohio's Case Western Reserve University to connect college students to the Arab community and provide them with an opportunity to work for a newspaper. Additionally, they work with WVIZ/PBS and WCPN/NPR to support their fundraising efforts. Salaheddine is a member of the Friendship Caravan Advisory Board as well as a number of Arab-American social groups including:

- Arab-American Community Center for Economic and Social Services
- Arab Americans of Central Ohio
- The American-Arab Anti-Discrimination Committee
- The Cleveland American Middle East Organization
- The Lebanese-American Chamber of Commerce
- The Lebanese-Syrian Junior Women's League.

== Recognition ==
Since its coverage of the 2004 presidential election, Al-Sahafa has been made the only Ohio correspondent for English Al Jazeera. Additionally, Al-Sahafa has received praise from a number of sources including Le Figaro in France, Forbes Middle Eastern edition and the Italian newspaper La Stampa. Salaheddine was also recognized by the Women's Community Foundation as an extraordinary woman of Cleveland in 2004.

== Criticism and controversy ==
Although the paper's initial goals were to focus on people, not politics, the recent world turmoil has caused the paper to address the War in Iraq and the Palestinian-Israeli crisis. Its March 2003 article, "Why is Bush so eager to go to war?", sparked substantial controversy in the Ohio community. Many residents wrote in criticizing the paper for questioning Bush's reasoning for war. The paper defended its actions, arguing that free speech is the cornerstone of America's democracy. Its further coverage of the Iraq War continued to spark controversy and was accused of portraying a liberal bias.

The paper's goal is to not be politically focused and not to present "radical viewpoints". Its mission statement is printed on the third page of every issue and reads "This publication DOES NOT & WILL NOT TOLERATE any form of Religious Contempt or Discrimination of country of origin in the Middle East. We are all God's children." Nevertheless, the editorial page has been accused of containing radical viewpoints and, although no violence is called for, there are often pro-Palestinian, anti-Israeli comments found within its pages. Even so, the paper does make clear that the opinions on the editorial page do not reflect those of the paper.

After the assassination of Lebanese Prime Minister Rafik Hariri on February 14, 2005, and the Cedar Revolution which followed, Salaheddine challenged the Lebanese to end the infighting and unite around a democratic Lebanon. She also challenged the Lebanese President and accused him of failing to take action to address the grievous wrongs done in the earlier assassinations.

The advice column, Cuz'n Kadin, (Kadin means "old soul") provides an outlet for confused Arab youth trying to cope with the conflicting American and Middle Eastern values. The column often stretches Arab cultural boundaries, but would still be considered conservative by some Americans. It offers advice for dealing with culture clash and is often criticized by older Arab-Americans as being too liberal.
