= WJTB (AM) =

Radio station in North Ridgeville, Ohio (1984–2017)

- North Ridgeville, Ohio; United States
- Broadcast area: Greater Cleveland
- Frequency: 1040 kHz

Ownership
- Owner: Taylor Broadcasting Co.

History
- First air date: September 16, 1984
- Last air date: May 17, 2017
- Call sign meaning: "James Taylor Broadcasting"

Technical information
- Facility ID: 64644
- Class: D
- Power: 5,000 watts (days only); 2,500 watts (critical hours)
- Transmitter coordinates: 41°22′37.00″N 82°00′27.00″W

WJTB was a commercial daytime-only radio station that was licensed to North Ridgeville, Ohio, at 1040 AM, and broadcast from 1984 to 2017.

Owned by Taylor Broadcasting Co., the station had broadcast a combination of gospel music and religious programming, serving the Greater Cleveland area. For a period of time, WJTB also served as the Cleveland affiliate for the Sheridan Gospel Network. WJTB's studios (since demolished) were located in Elyria, while the station's transmitter resided on Root Road in North Ridgeville.

== History ==
WJTB first went on the air on September 16, 1984. In February 2012, the Federal Communications Commission (FCC) fined WJTB $10,000 for failing to maintain a management and staff presence at its main studio. On June 2, 2017, the station's license was canceled for not paying debts it owed to the FCC.
