= Blee =

Blee may refer to:

== Chromatics ==
- Color
- Colorfulness
- Hue
- Complexion

== Form ==
- Visual Appearance
- Shape
- Configuration (geometry)

== A surname ==
- Francis J. Blee (a.k.a. Francis J. "Frank" Blee) (born 1958), an American Republican Party politician
- Kathleen M. Blee (born 1953), a professor of sociology at the University of Pittsburgh
- Robert Blee (1839–1898), the mayor of Cleveland, Ohio from 1893 to 1894
- Owen Blee, Dispensing Optician, Ireland

== Place ==
- Blee, a former village, now part of Monheim am Rhein
