= John H. Farley =

American politician

27th and 34th Mayor of Cleveland
- In office 1883–1884
- Preceded by: Rensselaer R. Herrick
- Succeeded by: George W. Gardner
- In office 1899–1900
- Preceded by: Robert E. McKisson
- Succeeded by: Tom L. Johnson

Personal details
- Born: John Harrington Farley; February 5, 1846; Cleveland, Ohio, U.S.
- Died: February 9, 1922 (aged 76); Cleveland, Ohio, U.S.
- Political party: Democratic
- Spouse: Margaret Kenney (m. 1884; died 1901)

John Harrington Farley (February 5, 1846 – February 9, 1922), also known as "Honest John" Farley, was an American politician of the Democratic Party who served as the 27th and 34th mayor of Cleveland, Ohio, from 1883 to 1884 and from 1899 to 1900.

== Early life and career ==
John Farley was born on February 5, 1846, in Cleveland, Ohio, to Patrick and Ann (née Schwartz) Farley. His father had been born in Ireland, and emigrated to the United States, settling in Cleveland in 1833. He won the city commission for all mail and express freight arriving in Cleveland, which made him a wealthy man. His mother had been born in the Kingdom of Bavaria, and emigrated to the United States with her farmer father, John. The Farley family was a large one.

Farley was educated in Cleveland's public schools. He left school before the age of 16 to take over the wholesale grocery and liquor business owned by his elder brother, Andrew, who had died. After winding up the business, he partnered with James Farnan to found a brass foundry. Farley later took a business school course, and for a time worked as an accountant and bookkeeper. After his father's death in June 1883, Farley became a wealthy man.

Farley began his political career in 1871 when he was elected to Cleveland City Council as a Democrat and served three terms—one of them as council president. After twice running unsuccessfully, Farley was elected mayor of Cleveland in 1883. After serving one term in office, he was appointed collector of internal revenue by President Grover Cleveland. He served four years. Farley was made Cleveland's director of public works by Mayor Robert Blee in the spring of 1893.

Farley ran for mayor again in 1899, defeating the incumbent Republican, Robert E. McKisson. In his tenure as mayor, Farley had to request the state militia to support Cleveland police in maintaining order during the streetcar strike in 1899. Farley retired from the mayor's office in 1901. His successor was progressive Democrat, Tom L. Johnson, regarded by many as Cleveland's greatest mayor.

After his mayorship, Farley made a career in business and played a part in the founding of the Central National Bank. He was elected president of the Mutual Building & Investment Co., and a director of the Guardian Savings and Trust Co.

== Personal life and death ==
Farley married Margaret Kenney of Cleveland on November 23, 1884. She died of pneumonia on February 17, 1901, after a long battle with influenza.

Farley suffered a stroke in Public Square in downtown Cleveland while riding in a streetcar on the evening of February 9, 1922. He died in an ambulance en route to the Huron Road Hospital. He was buried at Woodland Cemetery in Cleveland.

Political offices
Preceded by Rensselaer R. Herrick	Mayor of Cleveland; 1883–1884	Succeeded by George W. Gardner
Preceded by Robert E. McKisson	Mayor of Cleveland; 1899–1900	Succeeded by Tom L. Johnson
