= Robert E. McKisson =

American politician

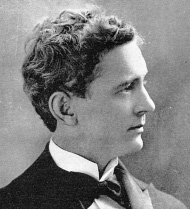

33rd Mayor of Cleveland
- In office 1895–1898
- Preceded by: Robert Blee
- Succeeded by: John H. Farley

Personal details
- Born: Robert Erastus McKisson; January 30, 1863
- Died: October 14, 1915 (aged 52)
- Party: Republican
- Profession: Lawyer

Robert Erastus McKisson (January 30, 1863 – October 14, 1915) was an American politician of the Republican party. He served as the 33rd mayor of Cleveland, Ohio, from 1895 to 1898.

McKisson first arrived in Cleveland with his family in the early 1870s, and moved to LaGrange, Ohio, in 1879. In 1887, he began studying law in Cleveland, passed the Ohio bar exam in 1889, and began practicing law with John Webster and Elgin Angell in 1891.

McKisson, who was interested in politics, was elected to Cleveland City Council in 1894 and became an outspoken critic of the mayoral administration of Robert Blee, a Democrat. His rhetoric paid off when he beat Blee in the 1895 mayoral race. In his two-term tenure as mayor, McKisson began construction on a new city water and sewer system. He also widened and straightened the Cuyahoga River to facilitate steamer traffic, and built five new bridges across the river. He created a powerful political machine loyal to him that challenged Mark Hanna for control of the local Republican party. In 1898, he ran against Hanna for a seat in the Senate, but lost in a very close election. In the 1899 election, McKisson was defeated by John H. Farley, a former mayor of Cleveland. He retired from politics and returned to private practice.

Political offices
Preceded by Robert Blee	Mayor of Cleveland; 1895–1898	Succeeded by John H. Farley
