= Rensselaer R. Herrick =

American politician

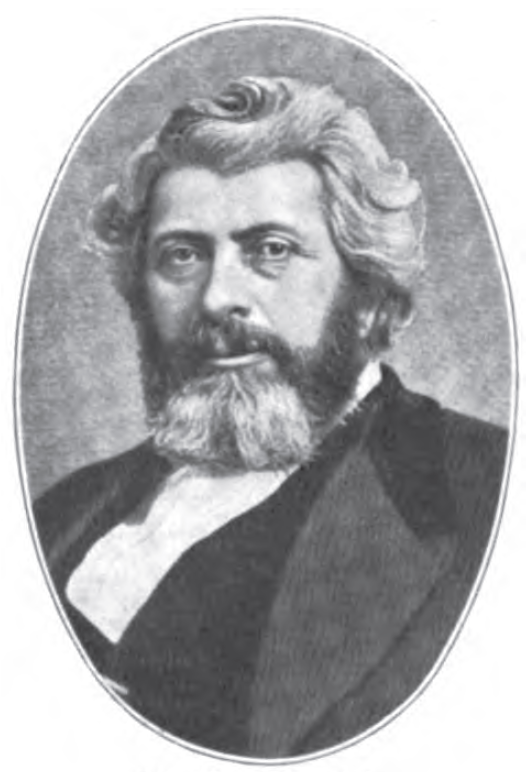

26th Mayor of Cleveland
- In office 1879–1882
- Preceded by: William G. Rose
- Succeeded by: John H. Farley

Personal details
- Born: Rensselaer Russell Herrick; January 29, 1826; Utica, New York, U.S.
- Died: January 30, 1899 (aged 73); Cleveland, Ohio, U.S.
- Political party: Republican
- Spouse(s): Adelaide Cushman (m. 1846, divorced) Laura White Hunt (m. 1888)

Rensselaer Russell Herrick (January 29, 1826 – January 30, 1899) was an American politician of the Republican Party who served as the 26th Mayor of Cleveland, Ohio, from 1879 to 1882, and earlier as a Cleveland City Councilman.

== Biography ==
Rensselaer R. Herrick was born in Utica, New York on January 29, 1826.

He died at his home in Cleveland on January 30, 1899. He is buried at Cleveland's Lake View Cemetery.

Political offices
Preceded by William G. Rose	Mayor of Cleveland; 1879–1882	Succeeded by John H. Farley
