= Sara Lucy Bagby =

Last person in the U.S. forced to return to slavery

- Born: c. 1843
- Died: July 14, 1906 (aged 62–63); Cleveland, Ohio
- Burial place: Woodland Cemetery
- Spouse: F. George Johnson

Sara Lucy Bagby (c. 1843 – July 14, 1906) was the last person in the United States forced to return to slavery in the South under the Fugitive Slave Act.

Born in the early 1840s in Virginia, she was of African American heritage. In 1860 she escaped slavery via the Underground Railroad and made her way to Cleveland, Ohio, in a free state. In January 1861, she was pursued by her enslavers, William Goshorn and his son, and arrested by a U.S. Marshal.

Despite the attempts of both the Ohio state government and citizens of Cleveland to intervene—including a purported dramatic armed standoff in a courtroom, as well as defense from well-known abolitionist lawyer Rufus P. Spalding —she was transported back to Goshorn's property in Wheeling, then still part of Virginia. Regarding her capture, local Republican newspaper The Cleveland Leader, despite having abolitionist views, encouraged its readers to "obey the law for the sake of unity". This episode forms the subject of a poem by Frances Ellen Watkins Harper, titled "To the Cleveland Union-Savers" (1861):

Men of Cleveland, had a vulture

Sought a timid dove for prey

Would you not, with human pity,

Drive the gory bird away?

Had you seen a feeble lambkin,

Shrinking from a wolf so bold,

Would ye not to shield the trembler,

In your arms have made its fold?

But when she, a hunted sister,

Stretched her hands that ye might save,

Colder far than Zembla's regions,

Was the answer that ye gave.

On the Union's bloody altar,

Was your hapless victim laid;

Mercy, truth, and justice shuddered,

But your hands would give no aid.

And ye sent her back to the torture,

Robbed of freedom and of fright.

Thrust the wretched, captive stranger.

Back to slavery's gloomy night.

Back where brutal men may trample,

On her honor and her fame;

And unto her lips so dusky,

Press the cup of woe and shame.

There is blood upon our city,

Dark and dismal is the stain;

And your hands would fail to cleanse it,

Though Lake Erie ye should drain.

There's a curse upon your Union,

Fearful sounds are in the air;

As if thunderbolts were framing,

Answers to the bondsman's prayer.

Ye may offer human victims,

Like the heathen priests of old;

And may barter manly honor

For the Union and for gold.

But ye can not stay the whirlwind,

When the storm begins to break;

And our God doth rise in judgment,

For the poor and needy's sake.

And, your sin-cursed, guilty Union,

Shall be shaken to its base,

Till ye learn that simple justice,

Is the right of every race.

Following her capture, Bagby was sent to Fayetteville, Tennessee by Goshorn — who was planning to sell her to Cuba— and was subsequently freed by union forces led by Captain Vance.

After the Emancipation Proclamation, Bagby moved to Athens, Ohio and then to Pittsburgh. In Pittsburgh, she married the Union soldier F. George Johnson. She and her husband resettled in Cleveland in the 1880s, where she received both honors and a standing ovation at a meeting of the Early Settlers Association held at Grays Armory in 1904. She remained in touch with the Goshorn family, and, in 1891, when William Goshorn was on his deathbed, she visited him and his sisters in Wheeling.

Bagby died in 1906 after contracting sepsis from injuries she sustained from falling down a flight of stairs at her place of work. She was buried at the Woodland Cemetery with a headstone reading "Unfettered and Free".
