= Robert Blee =

American politician

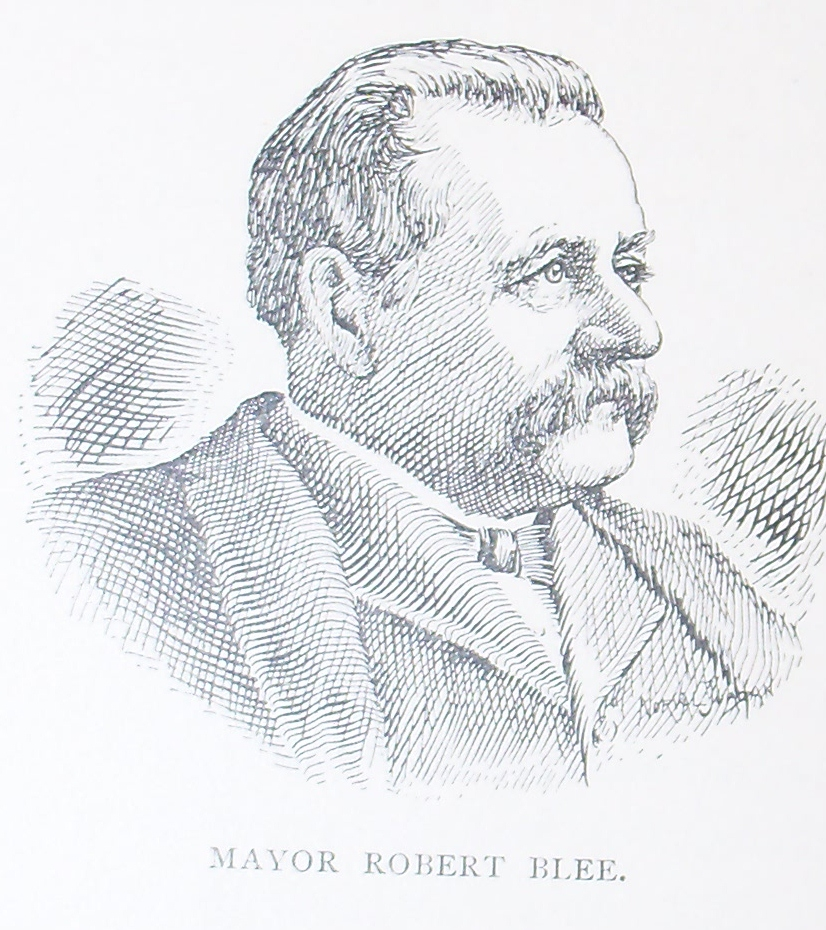

32nd Mayor of Cleveland
- In office 1893–1894
- Preceded by: William G. Rose
- Succeeded by: Robert E. McKisson

Personal details
- Born: January 31, 1839
- Died: February 26, 1898 (aged 59)
- Party: Democratic
- Profession: Railroad superintendent

Robert Blee (January 31, 1839 – February 26, 1898) was the mayor of Cleveland, Ohio, from 1893 to 1894.

For Robert Blee, all of the following information is from "Annals of the Early Settlers Association of Cuyahoga County" Volume IV, published by order of the Executive Committee in 1899. This association was open to all settlers who came to the Western Reserve by 1859 and resided in Cuyahoga County.

== Biography ==
Blee was born in the eastern part of what is now Cleveland, in 1839, and was the son of Hugh Blee, one of the early settlers of this county. Mr. Blee was prepared for Shaw Academy, a Collinwood educational institution, at a district school, which was located near the Lake Shore railway tracks in Glenville. The Blee family was moderately large.

When he was a student at the preparatory school, he watched the construction of the railroad, and his intense interest in railroads had an important influence in molding his career. "Some way or other I got my lessons," said the ex-mayor to a reporter several weeks prior to his death, "but I was looking out the window four-fifths of the time. Very often, the teacher would come down and strike me across the hands with a heavy ruler. At recess and noon, I would rush down to where the men were working on the railroad and remain there until I was forced to leave. "When we graduated, one of the school officials took the railroad as a subject of his address. One of his statements made a forcible impression at the time. The speaker referred to the building of the new means of transporting goods and passengers, and said that if the boys were smart, some of them would be brakemen; if they were particularly bright, some of them would become conductors and engineers; some of them might even become managers. Continuing, he said that one of us might some day be elected mayor of the big city then growing up on the west of us. "Well, I became a brakeman, a conductor and a manager, and served one term as mayor of Cleveland. But I guess that the presidency, which it was said that one of us might reach, is far beyond me."

== Career ==
When he was about 17 years of age, Mr. Blee came to Cleveland to look for work, and he succeeded in finding a position. For a year, he served as a brakeman on the Cleveland, Columbus & Cincinnati Railroad. He served under John Miller, now superintendent of the Pan Handle road, a part of the western lines of the Pennsylvania system. When civil war broke out, he was filling the position of passenger conductor. He enlisted and was assigned to look after the transportation of troops between Cleveland, Camp Chase and Camp Denison. Following the close of the war, he was appointed assistant superintendent of the railroad for which he formerly worked. Three years later, Mr. Blee was advanced to general superintendent of the road, then known as the Bee Line. He continued in that position until 1888, when a second consolidation produced the Big Four system, as at present constituted. Mr. Blee's authority was extended over the entire system. After thirty-six years of railroading, Mr. Blee resigned in 1891.

Mr. Blee organized the "Bee Line Insurance Company," and served as president for twenty-two years. During his incumbency, the distributions footed up several hundred thousand dollars. In 1875, Mr. Blee, who had always been a democrat, was made a police commissioner. In 1893, he was a successful candidate for the mayoralty, and served one term, being succeeded by Mayor McKisson.

The former mayor's business interests were many. "Every penny I possess, I earned honestly," he said in discussing his success. "I took advantage of opportunities, and I was a successful speculator. If any person can show that I ever defrauded him out of a dollar, I will return the money with good interest." Mr. Blee was a president of the Ohio National Building and Loan Company, a director in the State National Bank, the Grafton Stone Company (note: in 2009 the former grounds of the Grafton Stone Company are located within The Indian Hollow Reservation of The Lorain County Metro Parks in Grafton, Ohio. The quarries are still there and the property can be hiked), and several other companies. In the railroad world, he was known as "Honest Bob Blee." Mr. Blee never married. He lived at No. 2084 on Euclid Avenue with a maiden sister.

== Death ==
Robert E. Blee, the ex-mayor of Cleveland, died February 26, 1898, at his home, No. 2084 on Euclid Avenue, the immediate cause of his death being pneumonia. Mr. Blee had an interesting career. He was buried at Woodland Cemetery in Cleveland.

Political offices
Preceded by William G. Rose	Mayor of Cleveland; 1893–1894	Succeeded by Robert E. McKisson
