= Senter =

Senter is a surname, and may refer to:

- Anthony Senter (born 1955), American mobster
- Boyd Senter (1899-1982), American jazz musician
- Darren Senter (born 1972), Australian professional rugby league footballer
- Dewitt Clinton Senter (1830-1898), American politician
- George B. Senter (1827-1870), American politician
- Henry M. Senter (1873-1934), American football player
- Josh Senter (born 1979), American screenwriter
- Leon B. Senter (1889-1965), American architect
- Lyonel Thomas Senter Jr. (1933–2011), American judge
- William Tandy Senter (1801-1848), American politician
