= Cleveland, Columbus and Cincinnati Railroad =

Railroad in Ohio, United States

- Lines of the Cleveland, Columbus and Cincinnati Railroad

Overview
- Headquarters: Cleveland, Ohio, U.S.
- Locale: Ohio, United States
- Dates of operation: April 16, 1851–May 16, 1868
- Successor: Cleveland, Columbus, Cincinnati and Indianapolis Railway

Technical
- Track gauge: 4 ft 10 in (1,473 mm)
- Length: 137.8 miles (221.8 km) (1851); 187.8 miles (302.2 km) (1862)

The Cleveland, Columbus and Cincinnati Railroad (CC&C) was a railroad that ran from Cleveland to Columbus in the U.S. state of Ohio in the United States. Chartered in 1836, it was moribund for the first 10 years of its existence. Its charter was revived and amended in 1845, and construction on the line began in November 1847. Construction was completed and the line opened for regular business in February 1851. The CC&C absorbed a small bankrupt railroad in 1861, and in May 1868 merged with the Bellefontaine Railway to form the Cleveland, Columbus, Cincinnati and Indianapolis Railway.

== First charter and failure to build ==
=== Early proposals ===
The first railroad from Lake Erie to Columbus was proposed in 1831. Intended to run from Sandusky on the lake south to Dayton, with a branch to Columbus, no action was taken on this project. On February 8, 1832, the Ohio General Assembly granted a charter to the Columbus, Marion, and Sandusky Railroad. This line was authorized to have its terminus in Columbus and run through the towns of Delaware, Marion, and Upper Sandusky before connecting with the Mad River and Lake Erie Railroad. No construction ever began on this railroad, either.

=== First charter of the Cleveland, Columbus and Cincinnati Railroad ===
The Cleveland, Columbus and Cincinnati Railroad (CC&C) was chartered by the state of Ohio on March 14, 1836, and authorized to construct a railroad from Cleveland to Cincinnati, passing through the cities of Columbus and Wilmington. The charter required that construction begin within three years, and that the road be completed no later than 10 years after the start of construction. The incorporators of the new CC&C included John A. Bryan and others from Franklin County, as well as investors from Clark, Clinton, Cuyahoga, Delaware, Greene, Hamilton, Holmes, Knox, Lorain, Madison, Medina, Richland, and Wayne counties, met to plan the railroad. Fundraising failed, no construction occurred, and the charter lapsed.

== Revived charter and fund-raising ==
=== Revival of the charter ===
In 1844, John W. Allen, Philo Scoville, and five other Cleveland business and civic leaders sought to revive the CC&C charter. They succeeded in persuading the Ohio General Assembly to do so on March 12, 1845. The new charter specified that the railroad must construct a line between Cleveland and Columbus, and was permitted (but not required) to build a line from Columbus to Cincinnati. The railroad also had the right to connect to any other railroad in the state. (Note: On February 8, 1847, the state further amended the road's charter to permit the construction of branch lines.)

A group of railroad investors met in Columbus on May 1, 1845, to discuss the organization of the railroad. This group included William Dennison Jr., Lincoln Goodale, and Joseph Ridgway of Franklin County, and Irad Kelley, brother of Alfred Kelley, from Cuyahoga County. A temporary board of directors was elected, which included William Dennison Jr., Truman P. Handy, and Samuel Medary. The board agreed to open the corporate books and begin selling stock on June 3. Shares worth more than $25,000 ($900,000 in 2025 dollars) were sold, allowing the company to be organized under the terms of its charter.

The board determined that, with the Columbus and Xenia Railroad soon to begin construction from Columbus to Cincinnati, the CC&C should not attempt to build a line from Cleveland to Cincinnati. Constructing the line from Cleveland only to Columbus was considered more feasible. An early estimate pegged the cost of construction at $1.5 million ($51,800,000 in 2025 dollars).

The first permanent board of directors of the CC&C was elected on October 11, 1845. The board consisted of Samuel Medary, Robert E. Neil, William Neil, and William Starling Sullivant of Columbus and John W. Allen, Richard Hilliard, Henry B. Payne, Peter M. Waddell, and John M. Woolsey of Cleveland. Allen was elected president by the board, and William Neil the treasurer. Albert G. Lawrence, a non-board member, was elected secretary. Clevelanders predominated on the board because it was assumed that construction would begin in that city. The remainder of the board was from Columbus. By not picking board members from points between the two cities, the board hoped to avoid any appearance of a conflict of interest in choosing the route.

=== Survey and failure to raise funds ===
A survey party began examining possible routes for the railroad at the end of October 1845, and by November 15 a second survey group was in the field as well. The board of directors settled on a route in August 1846, although it admitted that there were no funds to begin construction. President Allen then claimed in November 1846 that the company not only had enough money to begin construction on the first 40 miles (64 km) of track but that work would also begin on December 1, 1846.

The CC&C attempted to sell stock to raise the necessary funds to begin construction. Shares worth $50,000 ($1,727,678.57143 in 2025 dollars) were sold by January 1847, far below expectations. The officers of the railroad told the board on April 3 that they could not raise funds anywhere in the state. The company resurveyed and restudied the proposed route with an eye toward cutting costs. The CC&C had so little funds on hand that by April 15 it was $3,913 ($135,208 in 2025 dollars) in debt. The railroad and its backers publicly admitted the project was likely dead. The city of Cleveland donated $200,000 ($6,900,000 in 2025 dollars) worth of city bonds to the railroad in April 1847 to help save it, but the company found that market conditions were so poor the bonds could not be sold. The board put any further expenditures on indefinite hold in May.

=== Appointment of Alfred Kelley ===
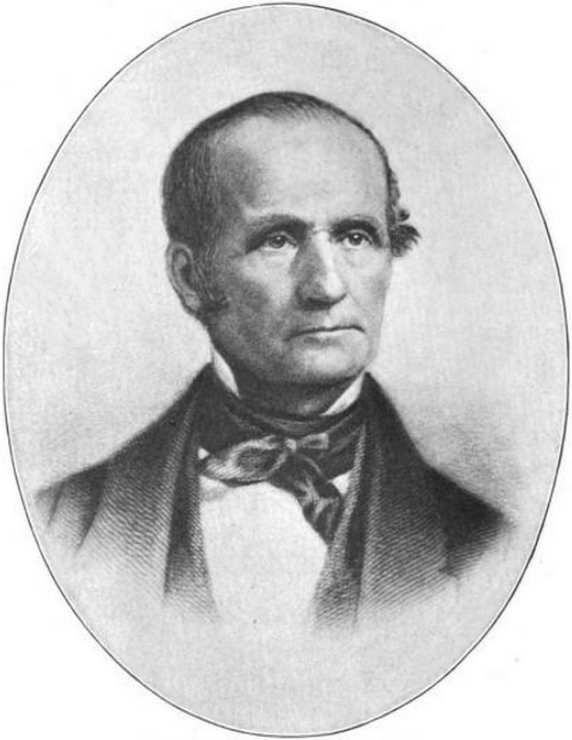
Alfred Kelley

Financier Edmund Dwight, representing the wealthy Dwight family of Massachusetts and New York, visited the city in August 1847. The Dwights and Kelleys had invested in a bank in Cleveland, and the Dwights were strongly interested in Ohio railroads. Edmund Dwight told the board that improved investor confidence was needed to raise funds, and this required that the board seek a new leader who could ensure the efficient and timely construction of a well-built railroad. Allen resigned the presidency, and the board elected Alfred Kelley and Leonard Case Jr. to the board of directors. Kelley was appointed president on August 13. Kelly was well known throughout the state as the "father of the Ohio and Erie Canal", and was one of the most dominant commercial, financial, and political people in Ohio in the first half of the 1800s. He was also one of the ablest bankers and financiers in the state. (Note: Kelley had also previously worked closely with three members of the board. William Dennison Jr. and Samuel Medary were both incorporators of the Columbus and Xenia Railroad, and had elected Kelley president of that railroad as well. Truman P. Handy and Kelley were both directors of the Commercial Bank of Lake Erie.)

Kelley immediately began speaking with his colleagues in the banking and finance fields, and by early September 1847 indicated to the board that a favorable response had been found among investors in New York City. Kelley ordered 10 miles (16 km) of the line, beginning at Cleveland, to begin construction as a test of new construction methods and railroad technology. To ensure that the new charter did not lapse, on September 30, 1847, Kelley and other members of the board of directors went to Cleveland's Scranton Flats and ceremoniously filled a wheelbarrow with earth to symbolize the start of construction. The company hired an old man to work five days a week, continuously digging this trench, in order to prove to the state that construction was "ongoing". The railroad announced in late November 1847 that 12 miles (19 km) of line from Cleveland to Berea would be built. This contract was let to J.A. Ackley and Leander Ransom on December 1, although it is unclear how much (if any) of this track was constructed.

Kelley also began to raise substantial funds. He began his tenure as president by urging the board of directors (composed of wealthy Ohioans) to show faith in the business by purchasing company bonds. By September 15, 1847, the board had invested $100,000 ($3,500,000 in 2025 dollars) in the CC&C. Board member Leonard Case later invested an additional $500,000 ($17,300,000 in 2025 dollars). Kelley was a former resident of Cleveland, and promoted the railroad heavily in that city. By April 15, 1848, investors in Cleveland had purchased $100,000 ($3,700,000 in 2025 dollars) in company bonds, with pledges to purchase another $100,000 when the company asked. Kelley delivered a rousing one-hour speech in Cleveland in early August 1848, after which another $73,000 ($2,700,000 in 2025 dollars) in stock was sold.

== Construction of the line ==
=== Resurvey and construction report ===
Kelley, who had extensive experience with route surveying and knew the topography of the state extremely well, ordered the routes resurveyed again, a process which began in October 1847 and ended about the end of January 1848. Engineers Frederick Harbach and John Childe issued a new report to the board of directors on August 19, 1848. They confirmed that the two most-favored routes in 1846 were still the best, although several changes were identified which greatly improved them both. The engineers' preferred route (known as the Western Route), began in Cleveland (Note: The surveyors looked at starting the line in Elyria, Ohio, but determined that this terminus had serious cost and other disadvantages.) and was 135 miles (217 km) long, with a ruling gradient of just 0.28 percent. (Note: Grade is defined as feet per mile. Thus, a rise of 53 feet (16 m) per 1 mile (1.6 km) is a grade of 1 percent. A 1 percent grade is generally considered the maximum for the heaviest and longest trains. Main line grades of 2.1 percent may be permitted in very mountainous areas, but will require shorter trains, the use of several additional locomotives, and perhaps the uncoupling of some cars. Branch lines, feeder lines, and industrial lines may have grades as high as 4 percent, although only for short stretches of road.) The proposed temporary southern terminus of the line would be in Columbus, where the CC&C would connect with the Columbus & Xenia Railroad.

The estimated cost of construction and equipment was $2.567 million ($91,400,000 in 2025 dollars). (Note: The cost of construction alone, without locomotives and rolling stock, was $1.201 ($44,700,000 in 2025 dollars).) These costs included the construction of 13 fuel-and-water way stations, the construction of a passenger and freight depot in Cleveland, the construction of a roundhouse with locomotive and rolling stock repair shops in Cleveland, the construction of a roundhouse in Columbus, and enough equipment to run two passenger trains and one to three freight trains a day between Cleveland and Columbus. The track gauge was set to 4 ft 9 1/2 in (1,461 mm). (Note: In 1848, the state of Ohio required all railroads within the state to adopt a gauge of 4 ft 10 in (1,473 mm). The 0.5 inches (13 mm) difference between the state-mandated gauge and the gauge adopted by the railroad was somewhat unimportant, as rolling stock could accommodate up to 0.75 inches (19 mm) in difference between gauges without an increase in derailment, although other problems remained. A standard gauge car running on a narrower-gauge track created more friction, raising fuel costs. A narrower-gauge car running on a standard gauge track lacked traction, requiring more locomotive power to be added to the train. In both cases, the difference in gauge increased damage to rails and frogs, raising maintenance costs. In 1852, Ohio repealed the 1848 act, allowing railroads to adopt any gauge they chose so long as the gauge was uniform along the entire length of their road. The railroad changed its gauge to the standard 4 ft 8 1/2 in (1,435 mm) between July 1, 1876, and June 30, 1877.)

=== Beginning of construction ===
On September 29, 1848, the railroad announced that it would build the line as a single project. This was different from the approach most railroads took at the time. It was more common for a company to raise only enough funds to construct one segment of the road, and then open operations on that segment before beginning the fundraising needed to work on the next segment. Sometimes years could pass between the construction of segments. The CC&C, however, decided to grade, construct the track bed, and lay rail over the entire length of the line in one intense burst of activity. The contract for construction was awarded to the firm of Stone, Harbach, and Witt on November 1. Harbach was one of the two engineers who had resurveyed the line in late 1847 and early 1848. Amasa Stone had worked with Harbach and another railroad engineer, Stillman Witt, while building railroad bridges in New England. Kelley knew Stone well from his visits selling bonds back east. Kelley reached out to Stone, Harbach, and Witt, and asked them to build the railroad. Stone, Harbach, and Witt formed a company in late 1848 to do so, and agreed to take a portion of their pay in the form of railroad stock. (Note: When the line was completed, the stock soared in value, and all three men became extremely wealthy.)

Kelley personally traveled to the United Kingdom in 1848 where he contracted with Sir John Guest & Co. of Wales for T rails (Note: All of the railroad's rails came from the United Kingdom.) weighing 65 pounds per yard (32 kg/m). The 7,000 short tons (6,400 t) of rail purchased was sufficient to lay half the road. By the end of March 1849, the company had also signed contracts to purchase locomotives and rolling stock.

By the middle of May 1849, more than 1,000 men were at work grading the CC&C line and rail for the track had arrived in Quebec from the United Kingdom, awaiting shipment across Lake Erie to Cleveland. The city of Cleveland purchased $200,000 in railroad stock on May 27, 1849. Work was progressing so swiftly that railroad officials told the press in early June that as much as 37 miles (60 km) of the line might be operation by January 1, 1850. The rails did not arrive in Cleveland until July 1849, however, and this significantly delayed completion of the first portion of track.

As expected, construction began in Cleveland and moved south. Bath Street was regraded and lowered about 12 feet (3.7 m) in order to reduce the grade between Lake Street and the Lake Erie shore. By May 1849, the track bed had been constructed across Scranton Flats and two-thirds of the rail laid. The company was ready to begin grading of the line on the east side of the river as well as erection of the roundhouse. The company was also at work constructing three bridges in the city. The first of these was an iron bridge carrying the main line over the Ohio & Erie Canal. The second was a wooden bridge carrying the main line over the Cuyahoga River. This bridge connected the Scranton Flats with the east bank of the river at Canal and Vineyard Streets (now Canal Street and Lockwood Drive). (Note: This structure is the first of what is also called the Carter Road Railroad Bridge. It is unclear how many times the Cuyahoga River main line bridge was replaced between 1849 and 1900. It is well-documented, however, that the railroad replaced the bridge in 1874 with a double-track swing bridge 210 feet (64 m) long. Built by the local bridge firm of McNairy, Claflen & Co. for $5,000 ($100,000 in 2025 dollars), it was only the second double-track swing bridge in the nation. In 1890, the U.S. Army Corps of Engineers called this bridge one of the 26 most important bridges in the greater Cleveland area. The bridge was later given the name "Big Four Bridge No. 9" as an identifier. At the urging of the city, the railroad rebuilt the superstructure of this bridge in 1898. The swing bridge was removed in late February 1898 and a temporary wooden bridge, with a draw span over the western part of the river, was erected. The Spanish–American War delayed the delivery of iron, and the bridge was not completed until 1900. The railroad demolished the two-year-old swing bridge in 1902, replacing it with a much faster rolling lift bridge designed by the Scherzer Rolling Lift Bridge Co. The new bridge, completed on October 15, 1901, by the King Bridge Co. (superstructure, machinery, and erection) and I.D. Tuttle (substructure), was 218 feet (66 m) long, which included a 120-foot (37 m) leaf and a 70-foot (21 m) approach span over the eastern channel.) The third was a wooden bridge carrying a spur of the main line over the Cuyahoga River. This bridge connected the Scranton Flats with the Columbus Peninsula at Columbus Road and Leonard Street. (Note: It is unclear how many times the Cuyahoga River spur/freight bridge was replaced between 1849 and 1900. Although documentation is not precise, this bridge was probably rebuilt about 1857. In 1890, the U.S. Army Corps of Engineers called this bridge one of the 26 most important bridges in the greater Cleveland area. The bridge was later given the name "Big Four Bridge No. 8" as an identifier. At the urging of the city, the railroad agreed to replace this bridge in 1898. Construction of the new structure did not begin until 1899. The new structure was a double-track rolling lift bridge designed and built by the Scherzer Rolling Lift Bridge Co. The bridge had a length of 125 feet (38 m) from abutment to abutment that created a 110-foot (34 m) wide shipping channel in the river. Its total length was 150 feet (46 m). Built at a cost of about $40,000 ($1,500,000 in 2025 dollars), it opened in early August 1900. The center pier of the old bridge, which obstructed ship traffic on the river, was removed.) During June 1849, work also began on a large engine house on the south end of the Columbus Peninsula, near the Columbus Road Bridge. This facility was constructed by the Cuyahoga Steam Furnace Company, which had entered into an agreement with the CC&C to build and operate a locomotive repair shop for the railroad. The railroad also erected a temporary depot adjacent to the New England Hotel at corner of Superior and Merwin Streets. It purchased the Bethel Church building adjacent to the hotel (on the square bordered by Superior, Vineyard, and James Streets) for use as an engine house.

Some 3,000 to 4,000 men were at work on the line at the end of July, completing the grading, constructing the track bed, and beginning to lay rail. With the cost of the main line appearing to hold steady at $2.5 million ($96,800,000 in 2025 dollars), Kelley personally went to New York City and sold another $400,000 ($15,500,000 in 2025 dollars) in bonds to keep the work going. He sold another $100,000 ($15,500,000 in 2025 dollars) in bonds to Ohio investors the same month.

=== Opening of the first track ===
The first 35 miles (56 km) of CC&C track, between Cleveland and Wellington, Ohio, opened about September 1, 1849. The northern terminus of the road was at a depot on the shore of Lake Erie at E. River and Bath Streets. Between St. Clair and Vineyard Streets, the road ran along the east side of Spring Street, which was widened by 30 feet (9.1 m) to accommodate the tracks. It crossed the Ohio & Erie Canal and the Cuyahoga River to reach the Scranton Flats. The locomotive repair shops were located at the south end of Columbus Road on the Columbus Peninsula. The line traveled south through the flats, and ascended the heights by following the valley of Walworth Run.

On September 13, 1849, the railroad leased from the city of Cleveland land on the shore of Lake Erie. This land was bordered by Bath Street (now Front Street) on the south, W. 9th Street in the east, and the Cuyahoga River in the west, and extended north to the lake. The railroad intended to use the area as the terminus of the main line, and to put a coal yard, dock, freight depot, passenger station, and warehouse there.

On November 1, Clevelanders welcomed the first locomotive ever to visit the city. Built by the Cuyahoga Steam Furnace Company of Cleveland, the 20-short-ton (18 t), $7,000 ($300,000 in 2025 dollars) locomotive pulled a work train of several flatcars for use in building the line. The roundhouse in Cleveland at the foot of Water Street (now W. 9th Street). and another 6 miles (9.7 km) of track opened in November 1849. Passenger cars began arriving in December from the Springfield Car and Engine Co. of Springfield, Massachusetts. By the end of the year, the railroad had received 3,000 short tons (2,700 t) of rails.

== Completing the line ==
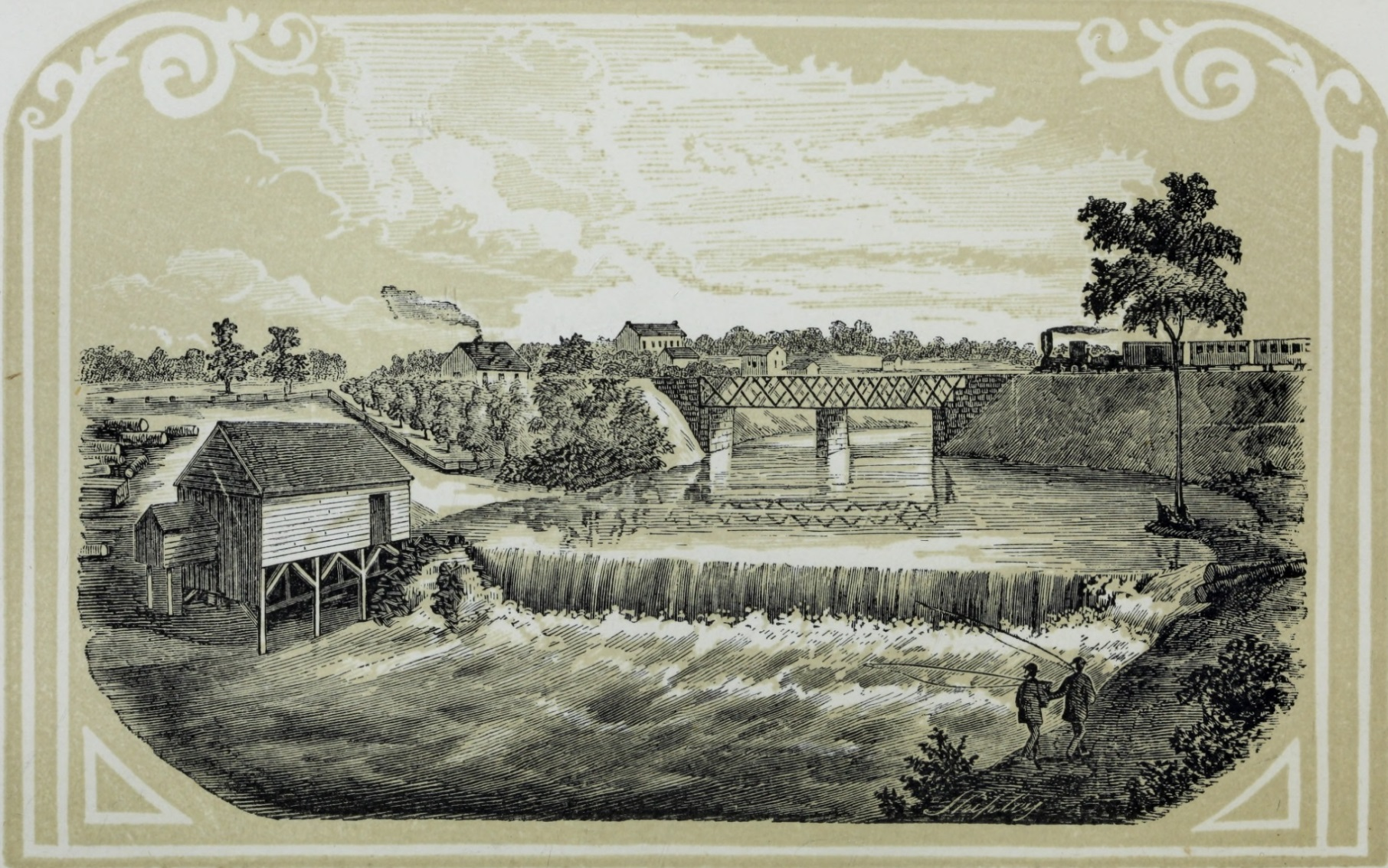
The 1850 CC&C bridge over the Black River near Grafton, Ohio

Alfred Kelley was reelected president of the Cleveland, Columbus and Cincinnati Railroad in January 1850. By this time, the company had graded two-thirds of the line between Wellington and Columbus, and all grading was expected to be finished by December 1. The company anticipated laying track on the line beginning in the spring, after track bed construction was finished.

A train carrying Kelley and several board members toured the completed 15 miles (24 km) of track in mid-March 1850, and another 10 miles (16 km) of track were laid by the end of April. Another 615 short tons (558 t) of rail arrived in the first week of May.

The railroad began operations between Cleveland and Wellington on May 16, 1850. The first train carried three freight cars. Passenger service to Wellington opened on May 27.

With the company in need of more rail, Kelley traveled to New York City in late May, where he sold enough bonds to pay for the necessary iron. By the end of May, three-quarters of the line was graded and half the line's bridges erected. Track was laid on about 45 miles (72 km) of the road, pushing the line 3 miles (4.8 km) past Wellington. Kelley traveled to the United Kingdom, returning in mid-June having purchased another 5,000 short tons (4,500 t) of rail. By this time, a second locomotive (again built by the Cuyahoga Steam Furnace Co.) had gone into operation on the line between Cleveland and Wellington, and a third locomotive (built by the Lowell Machine Shop in Lowell, Massachusetts) was due for delivery. With the addition of the third engine, the company began running twice-daily passenger trains between Cleveland and Wellington on July 10, 1850. By late August, the railroad was 10 miles (16 km) south of Wellington.

The CC&C reached Shelby, Ohio, on November 12, 1850, about 10 days later than expected. Freight and passenger service began the following day. Shelby gave the CC&C connections to the Mansfield and Sandusky City Railroad (which opened in 1846) and the Mansfield and Newark Railroad. (Note: The Mansfield & Sandusky City Railroad not only connected Shelby to the Lake Erie port town of Sandusky, Ohio, some 53 miles (85 km) to the north but also Mansfield, Ohio, about 6 miles (9.7 km) to the southeast. The Mansfield & Newark Railroad was scheduled to open its line between Mansfield and Mount Vernon, Ohio, on November 1. The line between Mt. Vernon and Newark, Ohio, was already complete, but an inoperative locomotive delayed operation on the line until December 1. When Mansfield and Mt. Vernon were connect, that completed construction on the Mansfield & Newark.)

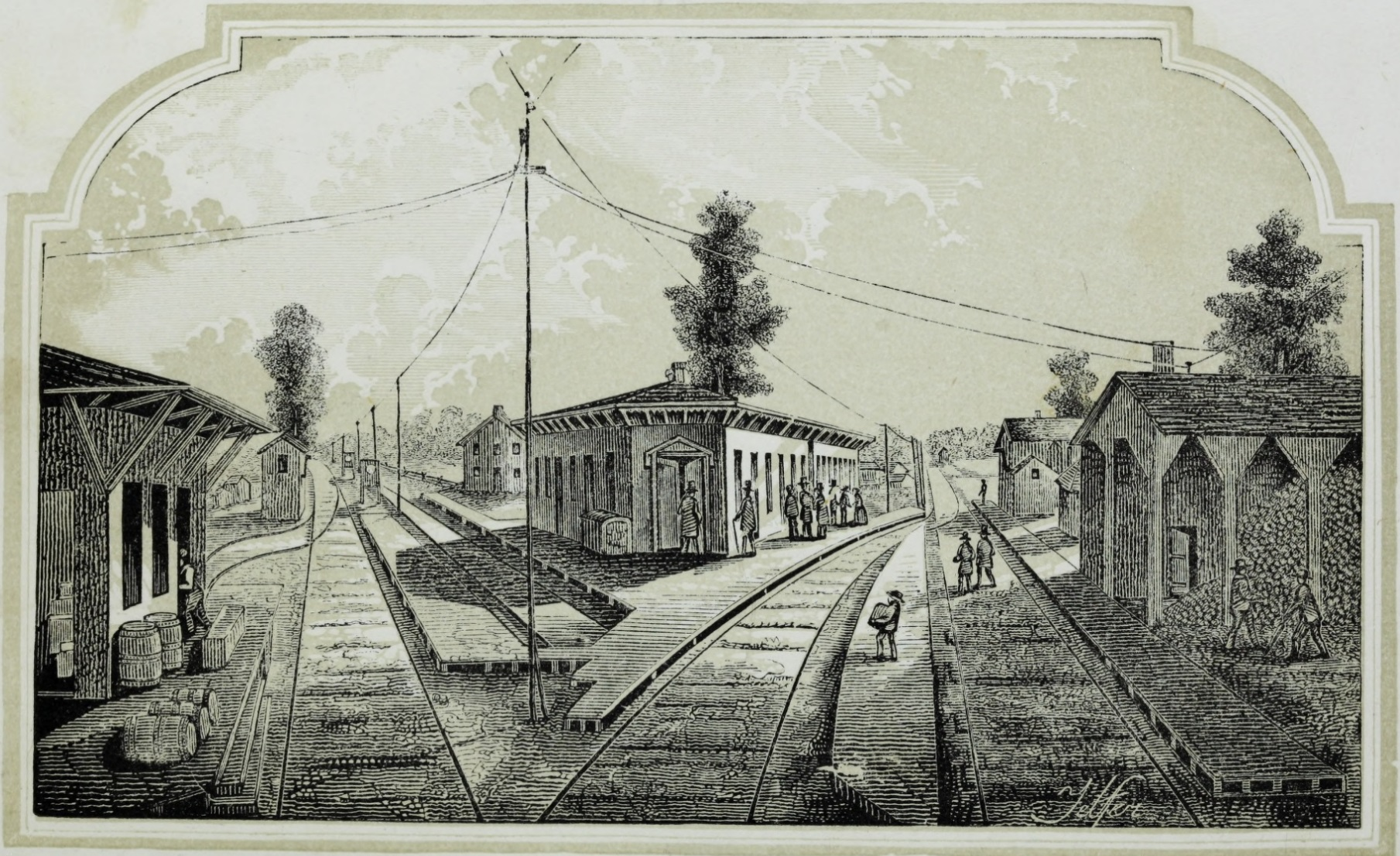
The CC&C freight and passenger station at Shelby, constructed in 1850

The CC&C received another 7,022 short tons (6,370 t) of rail by the close of 1850, with only 49 miles (79 km) of track left to lay as of early December. With less track to complete, layoffs left just 250 men at work on the line. Production of rolling stock was at its peak, with the railroad receiving two locomotives and 20 cars per month. Although winter weather was hindering work, the road had just 35 miles (56 km) of track left to lay by the end of the year, and work crews were laying 1 to 2 miles (1.6 to 3.2 km) of track each day.

The railroad received another 1,100 short tons (1,000 t) of rail in 1851. By mid-January of that year, only 15 miles (24 km) of track remained incomplete, and the Cuyahoga Steam Furnace works had delivered its sixth locomotive to the CC&C. Bad weather delayed additional work, and only 2 miles (3.2 km) of track were laid by January 31. An additional 1 mile (1.6 km) to 2.5 miles (4.0 km) of track were laid by February 12, with this track being laid from Columbus northward. With all bridges now complete, the incomplete track lay south of the town of Cardington to a point east of Delaware. Improved weather allowed work crews to lay track more quickly in early February, so that only 3 miles (4.8 km) of track were unfinished by February 16.

=== The final spike ===
The Cleveland, Columbus and Cincinnati Railroad was completed on February 18, 1851. At 7 A.M. on February 18, Alfred Kelley and a party consisting of the railroad's directors, Columbus mayor Lorenzo English, and a number of other business and civic leaders departed on a special northbound train from Columbus. Kelley and Mayor English each laid a final rail on the line. Kelley drove the last spike at noon. The party then reboarded the train and, after a salutary cannonade, proceeded to Cleveland. The train gave three whistles as it entered the city, which was returned by a three-cannon salute.

=== Celebratory excursion train ===
The CC&C began freight and passenger operations on February 21, 1851. To celebrate the event, Kelley invited Ohio Governor Reuben Wood, the entire Ohio General Assembly, the mayors and city councils of Cincinnati and Columbus, and numerous other local politicians and business leaders to travel at the railroad's expense on a four-day excursion trip from Columbus to Cleveland and back. The excursion train and its 425 passengers left Columbus on February 21 shortly after 8 A.M., its departure announced by a single cannon shot. The train stopped for lunch in Shelby, where officials of the Mad River and Lake Erie Railroad and the Mansfield and Sandusky City Railroad as well as elected leaders of towns and villages along these railroads boarded the train. The train reached Cleveland at dusk, welcomed by a cannon shot.

At 10 A.M. on February 22, three companies of Cleveland militia and the entire city fire department paraded in front of the excursionists, who were seated on a grandstand erected on Cleveland's Public Square. Governor Wood, Cleveland mayor William Case, Cincinnati politician George E. Pugh, Cleveland politician Samuel Starkweather, Ohio state senator Henry B. Payne, and Cleveland and Pittsburgh Railroad (C&P) president Cyrus Prentiss all spoke. Alfred Kelley was introduced, but did not speak. After the event, the excursionists boarded a C&P train and traveled to Hudson, Ohio, where they were served dinner. The C&P train left Hudson at 9 P.M., and Cleveland firefighters welcomed the travelers back to Cleveland with a torchlight parade.

The excursion train left Cleveland for Columbus at 8 A.M. on February 24, its departure saluted by another cannon shot. The train stopped in Shelby for lunch, after which the officials of Mad River and Lake Erie and the Mansfield and Sandusky City railroads, as well as elected leaders of towns and villages along these lines, left the train. The excursionists were treated to yet another dinner after the train reached Columbus.

The completion of the Cleveland, Columbus and Cincinnati Railroad created the first direct rail link between Cleveland and Cincinnati.

== Operational history of the line ==
=== Early operations ===
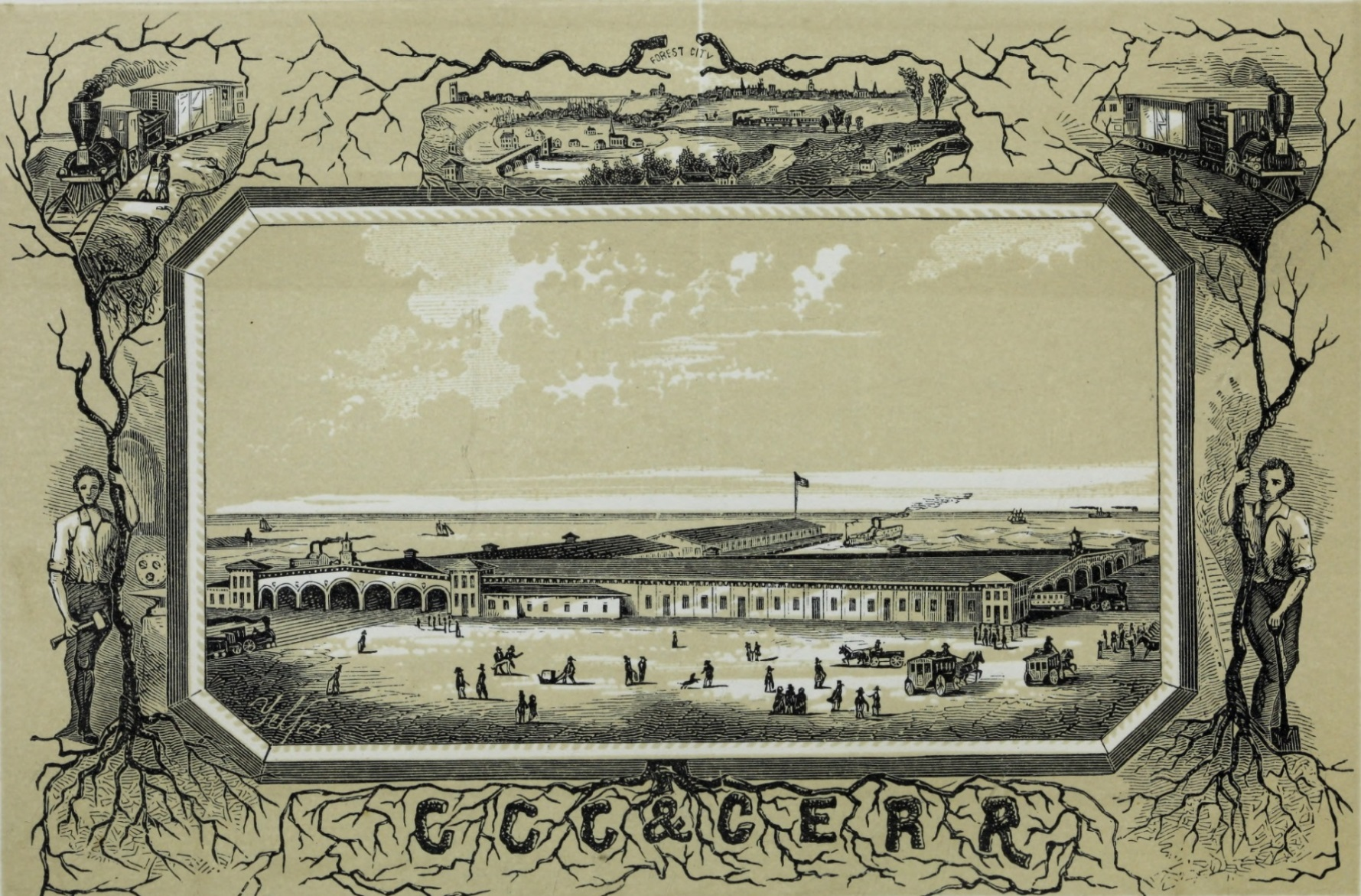
The permanent Cleveland station of the CC&C, built in 1851

At the beginning of 1851, the CC&C began to erect a permanent passenger depot at its terminus on Bath Street. The 200-by-80-foot (61 by 24 m) building was not large enough to serve all passengers, so through passengers used the Bath Street station and passengers terminating their travels in Cleveland continued to use the temporary depot next to the New England Hotel. The Bath Street depot opened on May 29, 1851. Although it was initially used only by the CC&C, the depot had been constructed as a cooperative effort by the CC&C, C&P, and the Cleveland, Painesville and Ashtabula Railroad (CP&A).

In March, the CC&C began work on a spur to serve the town of Delaware and connect the line with the Springfield, Mt. Vernon, and Pittsburg Railroad. This 5.77-mile (9.29 km) spur, known as the "Delaware Curves", was completed in 1853.

Amasa Stone was appointed superintendent of the road on April 7, 1851, and initiated thrice-daily express train passenger service on April 16.

In August 1851, the railroad began building a pier which extended into Lake Erie and a warehouse erected on the pier. By this time, the CC&C had 11 locomotives in freight and passenger operation on the line each day.

On December 1, 1852, the CC&C entered into a contract with the CP&A under which the CC&C would operate both railroads as a single line. This contract was superseded by a new agreement on April 1, 1855, which merely gave each railroad trackage rights on the other's line.

=== Expansion: 1853 to 1860 ===
Collaboration between the CC&C and CP&A extended to more than just a depot. The CP&A's line initially did not extend west of E. 33rd Street in Cleveland. That railroad relied on the CC&C for repair facilities for its locomotives and cars. In the summer of 1853, the CP&A extended its Cleveland tracks to the Bath Street station. That year the two railroads jointly erected and operated a car repair shop northwest of the intersection of Lake Street (now Lakeside Avenue) and Alba Street (later known as Depot Street, now E. 26th Street). The construction of passenger rolling stock began at these shops in late 1853. The two railroads also began sharing locomotives. The two roads jointly owned 89 locomotives in September 1853, with another nine on order from the Cuyahoga Steam Furnace Co. and the Taunton Locomotive Manufacturing Company. More than half the locomotives owned by the CC&C and CP&A were built by the Cuyahoga Steam Furnace Co. To accommodate the need for locomotive construction and maintenance, the firm rapidly expanded its works on Columbus Road beginning in August 1852. Business "boomed", with the company making two locomotives a month there.

The CC&C made other improvements and changes in 1853 as well. Business on the line was so good that the CC&C began to double-track its line. By the end of the year, it double-tracked the entire 25 miles (40 km) between Cleveland and Grafton. The railroad also began construction of several new piers into Lake Erie, and the erection of a new freight depot on Front Street (formerly Bath Street). Having extensively filled in some of the lake east of its facilities, the railroad began grading this area in October 1855 in order to begin construction of a new engine house and machine shop. On July 1, 1853, the CC&C signed an agreement with the C&X and Little Miami Railroad (which connected Cincinnati to Springfield), which gave the CC&C trackage rights on both lines as well as through service.

Double-tracking of the railroad continued in 1854 and 1855. The CC&C added 4 miles (6.4 km) of double-track between Galion and Crestline in 1854, and 11 miles (18 km) of second track completed between Crestline and Greenwich in 1855. About this time, the CC&C also invested heavily in the bonds of the Columbus, Piqua and Indiana Railroad, a line connecting Columbus and Union City, Ohio, via Urbana, Piqua, and Covington.

The CC&C entered into a working consolidation with the Indianapolis, Pittsburgh and Cleveland Railroad (IP&C) of Indiana on April 1, 1856. This railroad was chartered in 1848 and completed in 1851. It extended from Indianapolis, Indiana, northwest to Madison and Muncie before heading due east to the border of Ohio. Its terminus was in the border towns of Union City, Indiana/Union City, Ohio. A sister railroad, the Bellefontaine and Indiana Railroad (B&I), was chartered in 1848 and was completed in July 1853. (Note: Both lines were constructed by the firm of Stone, Harbach, and Witt.) This road ran northeast from Union City through Sidney, Bellefontaine, and Marion to Crestline, where it connected with the CC&C. The B&I had entered into a joint operating agreement IP&C on March 14, 1856, and the CC&C's working consolidation gave it access to the important industrial and agricultural heart of Indiana.

The CC&C entered into another trackage rights contract in July 1856. Under this agreement, the Cleveland and Toledo Railroad agreed to pay the CC&C $86,000 ($3,100,000 in 2025 dollars) annually for 20 years. In return the C&T gained trackage rights over the CC&C line between Grafton and Cleveland. The CC&C also leased its engine house at Superior and Vineyard to the C&T the following September.

The company made a number of other operating changes in 1856 as well. It repaired the ice-damaged freight bridge over the Cuyahoga River in February, and in early November the railroad agreed to change its fixed-span bridges into draw span bridges. Conversion of the CC&C freight bridge was complete by November 15, and work on the main line bridge commenced shortly thereafter.

=== Mergers: 1860 to 1868 ===
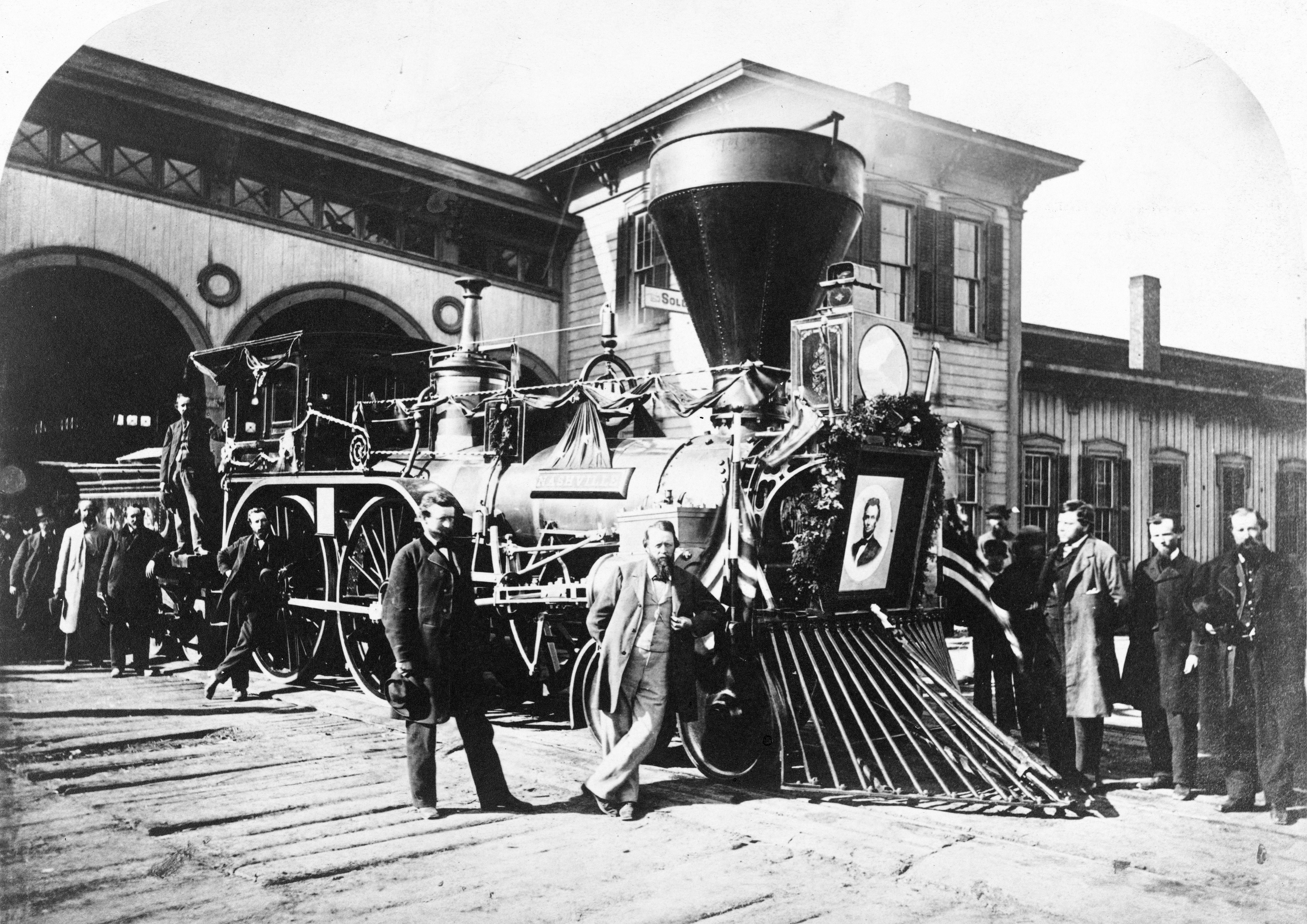
The Nashville in April 1865, the CC&C locomotive which pulled the Lincoln funeral train part of the way through Ohio. Note the portrait of Lincoln mounted on the front.

By 1861, the CC&C had added 80 miles (130 km) miles of double track to its main line, leaving just 55 miles (89 km) of single track. The railroad had also added 20 miles (32 km) of siding, and owned 22 locomotives, 74 flatcars, 297 freight cars, 93 livestock cars, and 31 passenger cars.

On January 1, 1862, the CC&C purchased a portion of the bankrupt Springfield, Mt. Vernon, and Pittsburgh Railroad from its creditors. This added another 50 miles (80 km) of track between the towns of Delaware and Springfield, Ohio.

The CC&C opened a new freight depot on Merwin Street in Cleveland in January 1863. Two months later, it opened a new engine house and machine shop on Merwin Street. These latter improvements cost $80,000 ($2,100,000 in 2025 dollars).

On April 29, 1865, the locomotive CC&C Nashville pulled Abraham Lincoln's funeral train from Cleveland to Columbus. The CC&C had also provided one of the nine cars that made up the train. The train had left Erie, Pennsylvania, pulled by the locomotive William Case, owned by the Cleveland, Painesville and Ashtabula Railroad. The CP&A locomotive Idaho traveled 10 minutes ahead, acting as a "pilot train" to ensure there were no problems on the track. The William Case arrived in Cleveland on April 28 at precisely 7 A.M. The CC&C's Nashville departed for Columbus just after midnight on April 29. The CC&C locomotive Louisville acted as the pilot train in front of the funeral cortege, also traveling 10 minutes ahead. The Nashville arrived in Columbus at 7:30 AM. The funeral train left Columbus at 8 P.M. on April 29, pulled by a locomotive from the Columbus and Indianapolis Central Railroad.

A merger in 1864 intertwined the CC&C with the Bellefontaine railroads. The CC&C had invested heavily in Bellefontaine and Indiana Railroad (B&I) bonds. Then, on September 27, 1864, the Ohio-based B&I and the Indiana-based IP&C merged to form the Bellefontaine Railway.

On May 16, 1868, the CC&C merged with the Bellefontaine Railway to form the Cleveland, Columbus, Cincinnati and Indianapolis Railway. The Bellefontaine Railway added 202.6 miles (326.1 km) miles of main track (118.4 miles (190.5 km) in Ohio) to the merged railroad. The merger brought 9.5 miles (15.3 km) of siding into the new railroad as well.

At the time of the merger, The CC&C was one of the few financially successful railroads in Ohio.

== U.S. and Ohio Supreme Court cases ==
From time to time between 1848 and 1900, the Cleveland, Columbus and Cincinnati Railroad and its successors deposited rubble and earth on the shore of Lake Erie. Over time, the railroad reclaimed 51 acres (210,000 m^{2}) of land between W. 9th Street and the Cuyahoga River. The railroad built coal docks, a rail yard, and warehouses on this reclaimed land. Other railroads with lakeshore properties did the same.

In 1893, the city of Cleveland sued the Cleveland & Pittsburgh Railroad, the CC&C, and other railways in state court, arguing that this reclaimed land belonged to city. It also sought to break the lease with the CC&C for the original Front Street property and seize the land for its own use. (Note: The city wanted to widen the mouth of the Cuyahoga River, which would have also required the reconstruction of the railroad bridges in the area. The city hoped to get the land for free, and force the railroads to pay for the bridge work.) The case was heard by the Circuit Court of Cuyahoga County, but was removed to the U.S. Circuit Court for the Northern District of Ohio. The federal court held in the city's favor. In July 1906, the United States Court of Appeals for the Sixth Circuit found that the case had been removed in error and remanded the case back to the state courts. The Circuit Court of Cuyahoga County heard the case again, and ruled against the city in 1909. The case, now known as Cleveland & Pittsburg Railway Company v. City of Cleveland, went to the Supreme Court of Ohio, which split 3-to-3 on October 22, 1912, and did not overturn the circuit court's ruling. The railroad appealed to the Supreme Court of the United States, which in Cleveland & Pittsburgh Railway Company et al. v. City of Cleveland, 235 U.S. 50 (U.S. 1914). found no grounds for federal jurisdiction.

The city of Cleveland, in possession of the land, now sought to prevent the CC&C and other railroads from continuing to reclaim land in Lake Erie. The state of Ohio successfully intervened, taking the lead in the case in order to protect its rights. The Circuit Court of Cuyahoga County found in the railroads' favor, however. The city appealed to the Court of Appeals for Cuyahoga County, which affirmed the judgment of the circuit court. The city appealed to the Supreme Court of Ohio. In February 1916, the high court held in State of Ohio v. Cleveland & Pittsburgh Railway Company, 113 N.E. 677 (Ohio 1916). that state law was silent on the matter of a leaseholder improving their riparian property by reclaiming land, and therefore upheld the judgment of the circuit court.

In response to the ruling in State of Ohio v. Cleveland & Pittsburgh Railway Company, the Ohio General Assembly enacted the Fleming Act in 1917. This legislation made the common law public trust doctrine part of Ohio statutory law. It also clarified that the state held title to reclaimed land under the public trust doctrine.

== Description of the line ==
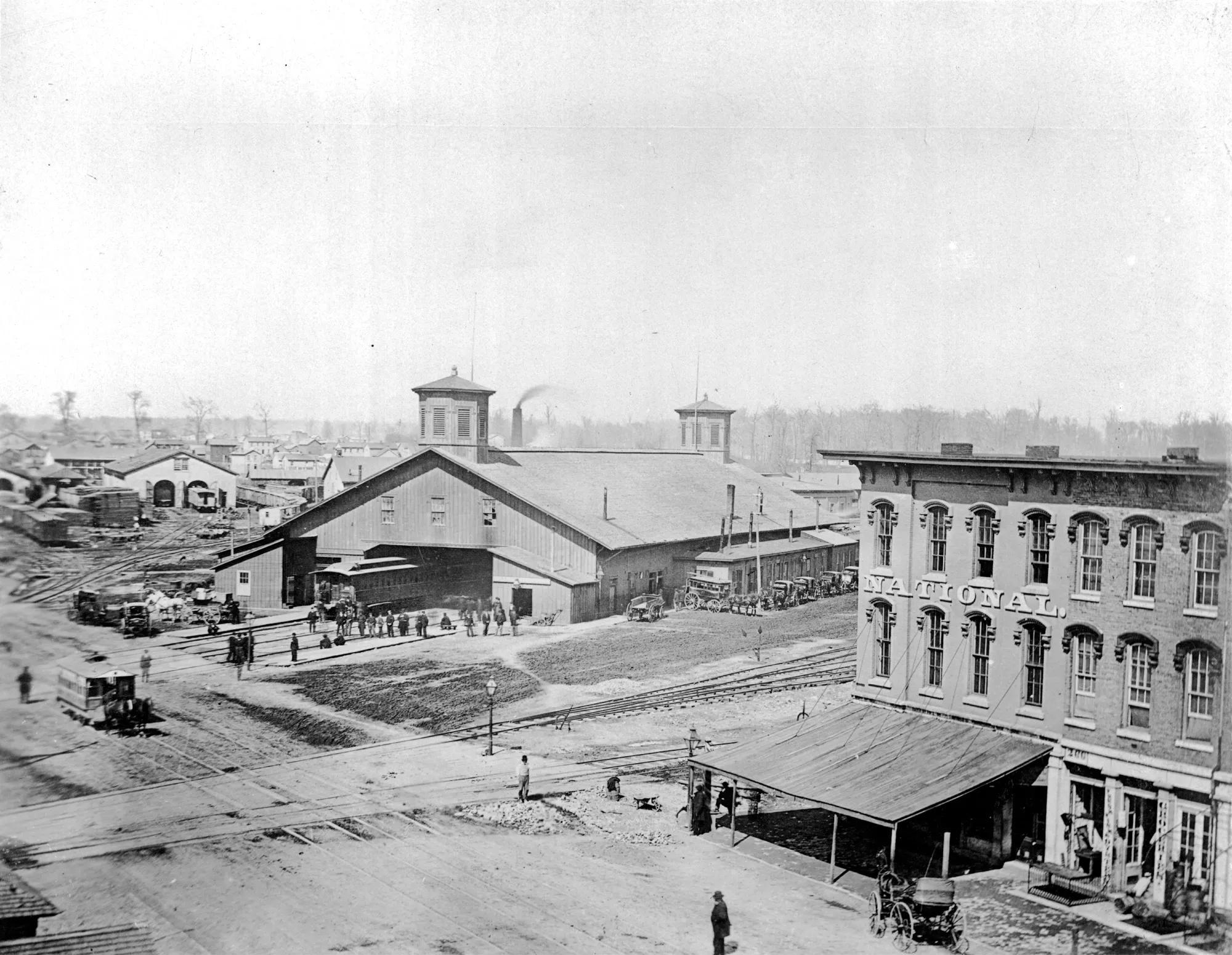
The jointly-owned CC&C and C&X "Union Station" in Columbus (with cupolas), completed in 1851

The headquarters of the CC&C were in Cleveland, Ohio.

As constructed, the Cleveland, Columbus and Cincinnati Railroad had 137.8 miles (221.8 km) of main track. The line had 20 stations, which included a main (freight and passenger) station in Cleveland. Beginning in Columbus, the 19 stations along the line included Worthington, Delaware, Ashley, Cardington, Gilead Station (near Edison), Galion, Crestline, Shelby, Mansfield, Salem (at Shiloh), Greenwich, New London, Rochester, Wellington Station (at what is now Wellington), La Grange Station (at what is now LaGrange), Grafton, Olmstead (now Olmsted Falls), Berea, Rockport (then in Rockport Township, the Bellaire–Puritas neighborhood of Cleveland). The station in Columbus was co-owned by the CC&C and the C&X. There were only nine bridges on the main line. Seven of these were originally constructed of wood, and the other two of iron.

The total cost of original construction of the main line was about $3 million ($116,400,000 in 2025 dollars).

The 1862 purchase of a portion of the Springfield, Mt. Vernon, and Pittsburgh Railroad added a 50 miles (80 km) single-track branch to the CC&C. This track ran southwest from the town of Delaware to Springfield, a town then located about 10 miles (16 km) northwest of Dayton.

== Bibliography ==
- Alburn, Wilfred Henry; Alburn, Miriam Russell (1933). This Cleveland of Ours. Chicago: S.J. Clarke Publishing Co.
- Avery, Elroy McKendree (1918). A History of Cleveland and Its Environs: The Heart of New Connecticut. Volume 1. Chicago: Lewis Publishing Co.
- Bates, James L. (1888). Alfred Kelley: His Life and Work. Columbus, Ohio: Press of R. Clarke & Co.
- Bryant, Keith L. Jr. (2007). "Development of North American Railroads". In Middleton, William D.; Smerk, George M.; Diehl, Roberta L. (eds.). Encyclopedia of North American Railroads. Bloomington, Ind.: Indiana University Press. ISBN 9780253349163.
- Camp, Mark J. (2007). Railroad Depots of Northeast Ohio. Charleston, S.C.: Arcadia Publishing. ISBN 9780738551159.
- Church, Samuel Harden (1899). Corporate History of the Pennsylvania Lines West of Pittsburgh. Series A, Volume 6. Baltimore: The Friedenwald Company.
- Church, Samuel Harden (1918). Corporate History of the Pennsylvania Lines West of Pittsburgh. Volume 14. Baltimore: The Friedenwald Company. hdl:2027/njp.32101045356092.
- The Cincinnati, Columbus, Cleveland and Erie Railroad Guide, Illustrated. Cincinnati, Columbus, Cleveland & Erie railroad guide. Columbus, Ohio: Ohio State Journal Company. 1854. hdl:2027/gri.ark:/13960/t6n03zk6k.
- Cole, Chester (2001). A Fragile Capital: Identity and the Early Years of Columbus, Ohio. Columbus, Ohio: Ohio State University Press. ISBN 9780814208533.
- Harbach, Frederick; Childe, John (1848). Report on the surveys, estimates and income of the Cleveland, Columbus and Cincinnati Railroad. Cleveland: Smead & Cowles. hdl:2027/njp.32101066800754.
- Hatcher, Harlan (1988). "Building the Railroads". In Lupold, Harry Forrest; Haddad, Gladys (eds.). Ohio's Western Reserve: A Regional Reader. Kent, Ohio: Kent State University Press. ISBN 9780873383639.
- Huntington, C.C. (1915). "A History of Banking and Currency in Ohio Before the Civil War". Ohio Archæological and Historical Publications. Cleveland: Fred J. Herr.
- Gregor, Sharon E. (2010). Rockefeller's Cleveland. Charleston, S.C.: Arcadia Publishing. ISBN 9780738577111.
- Haeger, John Dennis (1981). The Investment Frontier: New York Businessmen and the Economic Development of the Old North-West. Albany, N.Y.: State University of New York Press. ISBN 9780873955317.
- Harbach, Frederick (1850). Report on the Preliminary Surveys for the Cleveland, Painesville and Ashtabula Railroad Company. Cleveland: Sanford & Hayward.
- Hatch, Frederick (2011). Protecting President Lincoln: The Security Effort, the Thwarted Plots, and the Disaster at Ford's Theatre. Jefferson, N.C.: McFarland & Co. ISBN 9780786463626.
- Havighurst, Walter (1977). Ohio: A Bicentennial History. New York: Norton. ISBN 9780393056136.
- Hooper, Osman Castle (1920). History of the City of Columbus, Ohio, From the Founding of Franklinton in 1797, Through the World War Period to the Year 1920. Columbus, Ohio: Memorial Publishing Co.
- Johnson, Crisfield (1879). History of Cuyahoga County, Ohio: With Portraits and Biographical Sketches of Its Prominent Men and Pioneers. Philadelphia: D.W. Ensign. p. 384. "Amasa Stone 1818 Charlton."
- Kennedy, James Harrison (1896). A History of the City of Cleveland: Its Settlement, Rise and Progress, 1796-1896. Cleveland: Imperial Press.
- Lee, Alfred Emory (1892). History of the City of Columbus, Capital of Ohio. Volume 2. Chicago: Munsell & Co.
- McTighe, Michael J. (1994). A Measure of Success: Protestants and Public Culture in Antebellum Cleveland. Albany, N.Y.: State University of New York Press. ISBN 9780791418253.
- Myers, John; Cetina, Judith G. (2015). Irish Cleveland. Charleston, S.C.: Arcadia Publishing. ISBN 9781467113496.
- Ohio Commissioner of Railroads and Telegraphs (1868). Annual Report of the Commissioner of Railroads and Telegraphs, to the Governor of the State of Ohio, for the Year 1867. Columbus, Ohio: L.D. Myers & Bro., State Printers.
- Ohio Commissioner of Railroads and Telegraphs (1868). Annual Report of the Commissioner of Railroads and Telegraphs of the State of Ohio, With Tabulations and Deductions From Reports of the Railroad Corporations of the State, for the Year Ending June 30, 1868. Columbus, Ohio: Columbus Printing Company, State Printers. hdl:2027/uc1.b2896930.
- Ohio Commissioner of Railroads and Telegraphs (1870). Annual Report of the Commissioner of Railroads and Telegraphs of the State of Ohio, With Tabulations and Deductions From Reports of the Railroad Corporations of the State, for the Year Ending June 30, 1869. Columbus, Ohio: Columbus Printing Company, State Printers.
- Ohio Commissioner of Railroads and Telegraphs (1873). Sixth Annual Report of the Commissioner of Railroads and Telegraphs of Ohio for the Year Ending June 30, 1872. Columbus, Ohio: Nevins and Myers, State Printers. hdl:2027/uc1.b2896931.
- Ohio Commissioner of Railroads and Telegraphs (1874). Seventh Annual Report of the Commissioner of Railroads and Telegraphs of Ohio for the Year Ending June 30, 1873. Columbus, Ohio: Nevins and Myers, State Printers.
- Ohio Commissioner of Railroads and Telegraphs (1876). Ninth Annual Report of the Commissioner of Railroads and Telegraphs of Ohio for the Year Ending June 30, 1875. Columbus, Ohio: Nevins and Myers, State Printers.
- Ohio Commissioner of Railroads and Telegraphs (1878). Eleventh Annual Report of the Commissioner of Railroads and Telegraphs of Ohio for the Year Ending June 30, 1877. Columbus, Ohio: Nevins and Myers, State Printers.
- Ohio Commissioner of Railroads and Telegraphs (1901). The Thirty-Fourth Annual Report of the Commissioner of Railroads and Telegraphs, to the Governor of the State Ohio, for the Year 1901. Columbus, Ohio: F.J. Heer, State Printer.
- Poor, Henry V. (1888). Manual of the Railroads of the United States for 1888. New York: H.V. & H.W. Poor.
- Rose, William Ganson (1990). Cleveland: The Making of a City. Kent, Ohio: Kent State University Press. ISBN 9780873384285.
- Scheiber, Harry N. (Autumn 1978). "Alfred Kelley and the Ohio Business Elite, 1822-1859". Ohio History: 354–392.
- Scherzer Rolling Lift Bridges. Chicago: The Scherzer Rolling Lift Bridge Co. 1908.
- Stephenson, William (1848). Smead & Cowles' General Business Directory of the City of Cleveland for 1848-9. Cleveland: Smeade & Cowles.
- Thomas, William B. (Fall 1920). "Early History of the Old Bee Line R.R. and Its Completion By Hon. Alfred Kelley in 1851". Firelands Pioneer: 104–122.
- Vernon, Edward (1873). "American Railroad Manual for the United States and the Dominion". American Railroad Manual. Philadelphia: J.B. Lippincott & Co. hdl:2027/njp.32101066799089.
- Voight, Norman R. (2017). Transportation Depth Reference Manual for the Civil PE Exam. Belmont, Calif.: Professional Publications. ISBN 9781591264682.
- White, John H. Jr. (1968). "Cuyahoga Steam Furnace Company". Smithsonian Journal of History. 1 (3): 59–76.
- Wickham, Gertrude Van Rensselaer (1914). The Pioneer Families of Cleveland 1796–1840. Volume 1. Cleveland: Evangelical Publishing House.
