= Erie Street Cemetery =

Historic cemetery in Cleveland, Cuyahoga County, Ohio

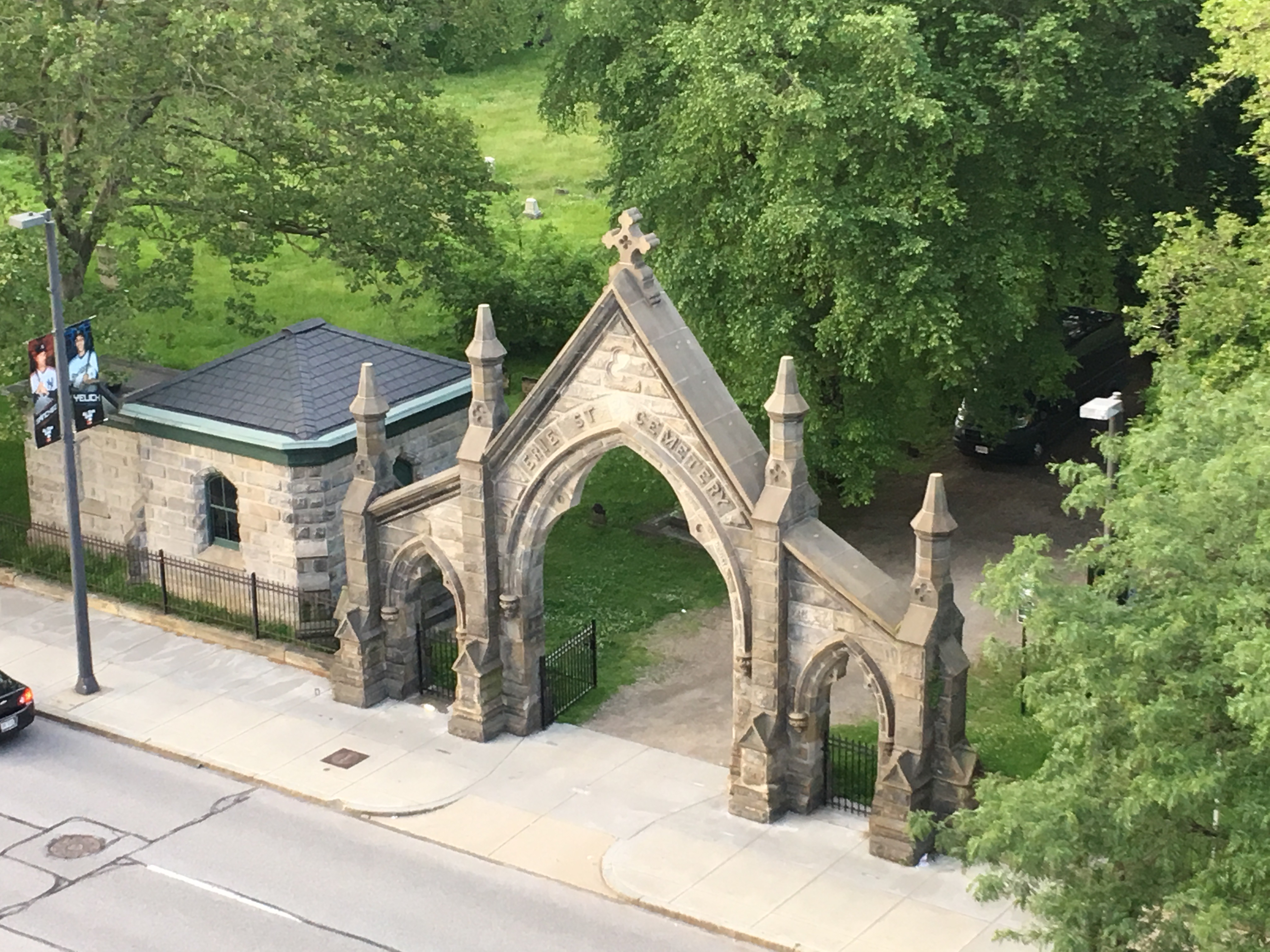
- Cemetery gate facing East 9th St.
- Interactive map of Erie Street Cemetery

Details
- Established: 1826
- Location: 2254 East 9th Street; Cleveland, Ohio
- Country: United States
- Coordinates: 41°29′52″N 81°40′54″W
- Type: Public
- Owned by: City of Cleveland
- Size: 8.9 acres (3.6 ha)
- No. of interments: 17,936
- The Political Graveyard: Erie Street Cemetery

Erie Street Cemetery is a historic cemetery in Downtown Cleveland, Ohio, United States. It is the city's oldest existing cemetery.

== History ==
The cemetery was established in 1826 at what was then the edge of the city, taking its name from East 9th Street's original name. It was the city's first permanent cemetery, replacing a community burial ground just south of Public Square. Many of Cleveland's earliest pioneers and leaders are buried there, including Lorenzo Carter, the city's first permanent white settler; and John W. Willey, the city's first mayor. The cemetery was open to members of all faiths.

During the administration of Mayor Tom L. Johnson in the early 20th century, bodies were moved from the cemetery to the municipally owned Highland Park Cemetery, and parts of the cemetery were vacated for city streets. The Pioneers' Memorial Association was formed in 1915 to advocate for the cemetery. In 1925, its future was secured when City Manager William R. Hopkins decided to build the Lorain-Carnegie Bridge around, rather than through, the cemetery.

Improvements and maintenance have been performed by groups including the Works Progress Administration and the Cleveland Grays. It was designated as an official Ohio historical site in October 2009, and it is a Cleveland City Landmark. Honors students at Cuyahoga Community College have conducted research about people buried in the cemetery. On September 16, 2024, the Erie Street Cemetery Historic District was listed on the National Register of Historic Places.

== Notable interments ==
Among the cemetery's more than 17,000 interments are veterans who participated in conflicts from the Revolutionary War through the Spanish–American War. Notable burials at Erie Street Cemetery include:

- John W. Allen (1802–1887), lawyer and politician, Mayor of Cleveland from 1841 to 1843
- Lorenzo Carter (1767–1814), Cleveland's first permanent white settler, community leader
- Leonard Case Jr. (1820–1880), philanthropist, namesake of the Case Institute of Technology (remains later removed to Lake View Cemetery, Cleveland, Ohio, but headstone remains at Erie Street Cemetery)
- David Eldridge, first person of European descent to die in the Western Reserve
- Jabez W. Fitch (1823–1884), politician, Lieutenant Governor of Ohio from 1878 to 1880.
- Josiah A. Harris (1808–1876), Mayor of Cleveland in 1847
- George Hoadley (1781–1857), Mayor of Cleveland in 1846 (remains later removed to Highland Park Cemetery, Highland Hills, Ohio)
- Joc-O-Sot (1810–1844), Meskwaki chief
- Lorenzo A. Kelsey (1803–1890), Mayor of Cleveland in 1848 (remains later removed to Lake View Cemetery, Cleveland, Ohio)
- Joshua Mills (1797–1843), physician and politician, Mayor of Cleveland from 1838 to 1839 and in 1842
- John W. Willey (1797–1841), politician, the first mayor of Cleveland, from 1836 to 1837 (remains later removed to Lake View Cemetery, Cleveland, Ohio, but headstone remains at Erie Street Cemetery)

== See also ==
- List of cemeteries in Ohio
