= Monroe Street Cemetery =

Historic cemetery in Cleveland, Ohio, U.S.

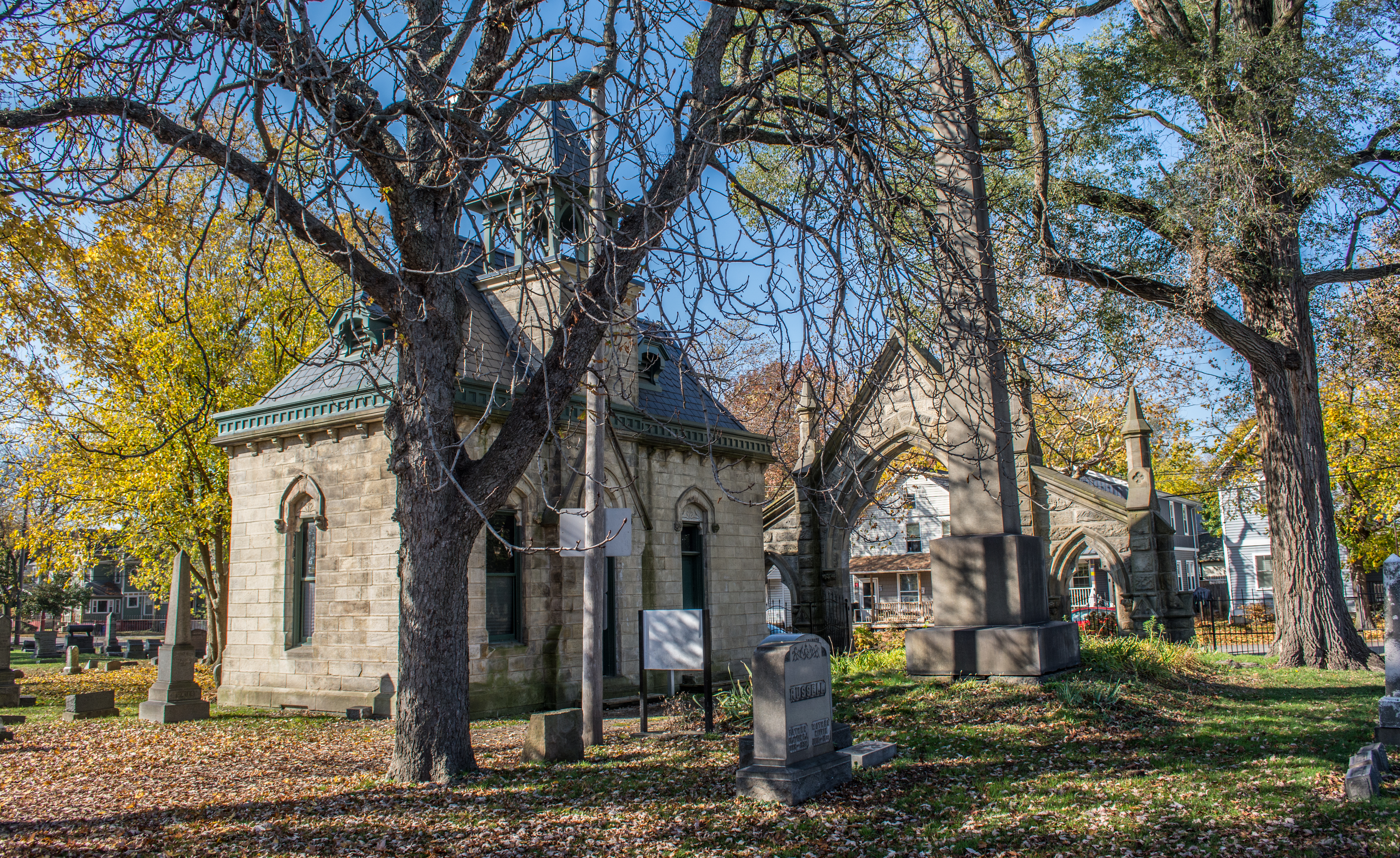
- Gatehouse (left) and arch at the Monroe Street Cemetery
- Interactive map of Monroe Street Cemetery

Details
- Established: January 1836
- Location: Cleveland, Ohio, U.S.
- Country: United States
- Coordinates: 41.4783°N 81.7053°W
- Type: Public
- Owned by: City of Cleveland
- Size: 13.63 acres (55,200 m^{2})
- No. of graves: 31,400 (2022)
- Website: Monroe Street Cemetery
- Find a Grave: Monroe Street Cemetery

The Monroe Street Cemetery is a historic cemetery located at 3207 Monroe Avenue in Cleveland, Ohio. It was designated a historic landmark by the City of Cleveland Landmarks Commission in 1973.

== History ==
Samuel P. Lord was one of the 57 investors in the Connecticut Land Company, a land speculation business formed in 1795 to take control of, survey, and encourage settlement in the Connecticut Western Reserve. Lord's investment entitled him to a portion of the Reserve, and he was allotted land along the west bank of the Cuyahoga River. His son, Richard Lord, emigrated to the area in 1818. With his brother-in-law, Josiah Barber, Richard Lord founded Brooklyn Township on June 1, 1818, on part of Samuel Lord's land.

Burials at the site of the cemetery began about 1818. In January 1836, Lord and Barber sold 6 acres (24,000 m^{2}) of land to the township for $160 (about ($4,700 in 2025 dollars) for use as a cemetery. Ohio City was incorporated from part of Brooklyn Township on March 3, 1836, and the cemetery became part of the new city. The burying ground was called Ohio City Cemetery. Ohio City professionalized the cemetery: The grounds were divided into plots, rules for administration and burials were enacted, a sexton was appointed, and a hearse purchased. Because title to the land was vested in the township, a dispute arose over who controlled the cemetery. This was resolved in 1841 when Ohio City adopted legislation formally taking title to the burial ground.

Ohio City was annexed by the city of Cleveland on June 5, 1854. Title to the cemetery now transferred to the city of Cleveland, which renamed it the West Side Cemetery. The city of Cleveland made several improvements to the cemetery. It was fenced to prevent local farm animals from roaming the premises, paved walks added, and the plantings improved. By 1879, the cemetery had expanded to 32.5 acres (132,000 m^{2}).

Monroe Street Cemetery was Cleveland's only graveyard on the west side until West Park Cemetery opened in 1900, after which the grounds became more commonly known as the Monroe Street Cemetery.

Monroe Street Cemetery was Cleveland's second-busiest cemetery in the first half of the 20th century. As the cemetery filled and other, modern cemeteries became available, burials fell off and the cemetery fell into some disrepair.

The gatehouse and arch at the entrance to the cemetery is a Gothic Revival structure designed by noted local architect Joseph Ireland. It was constructed in 1876 at a cost of $4,300 (about ($130,000 in 2025 dollars), and was identical to the gatehouse and arch constructed at Cleveland's Erie Street Cemetery. The gatehouse partially collapsed in 2010. As it was the only way into the cemetery, the cemetery closed to the public.

The city initially lacked the funds to save the gatehouse structure. Cemetery advocate Ken Silliman discovered the cemetery had a long-untapped endowment fund, and the city used these funds to rebuild the gatehouse in 2016.

== About the cemetery ==
The cemetery as of 2022 is 13.63 acres (55,200 m^{2}) in size, making it one of the 10 largest cemeteries in Northeast Ohio. At one time, the cemetery had a receiving vault and office, both made of stone, but these no longer exist. As of 2010, the cemetery was closed to new burials except for those who had already purchased and had room in plots.

Sources vary as to the number of burials. The Plain Dealer newspaper believed there to be 31,000 in 2010 and 32,000 in 2016, while author Alan Fodor estimated more than 31,400 in 2022.

There are more than 500 veterans of the United States armed forces buried there. Two American Revolutionary War veterans are buried there, as are about 400 individuals who fought in the American Civil War.

The cemetery contains a large number of impressive Victorian headstones, monuments, and memorials. Richard Lord's mausoleum appears relatively small, but has a substantial below-ground crypt. The most expensive mausoleum is that of H.L. Whitman.

== Notable burials ==
- Josiah Barber (1771—1842), mayor of Ohio City (Note: He was disinterred in 1882 by his son, Josiah Barber Jr., and moved to Riverside Cemetery in Cleveland. The younger Barber had co-founded Riverside.)
- John Beverlin (1813—1891), mayor of Ohio City
- William B. Castle (1814—1872), last mayor of Ohio city and the first mayor of Cleveland after the annexation of Ohio City (Note: He was disinterred at some later date, and re-interred at Cleveland's Lake View Cemetery beneath a funerary monument featuring St. John the Evangelist.)
- Alfred Greenbrier (1808—1888), mixed-race (African and European) farmer, abolitionist, and Underground Railroad "station master"
- David Griffith (1792—1877), mayor of Ohio City
- John Michael Kick (1840—1875), first Cleveland police officer killed in the line of duty
- Richard Lord (1780—1857), mayor of Ohio City
- Irvine U. Masters (1823—1865), ship-builder and mayor of Cleveland
- Needham Standart (1797—1874), mayor of Ohio City
- James A. Thome (1813—1873), pastor and abolitionist

== Bibliography ==
- Johnson, Crisfield (1879). History of Cuyahoga County, Ohio: With Portraits and Biographical Sketches of Its Prominent Men and Pioneers. Philadelphia: D.W. Ensign.
