= Irvine U. Masters =

American mayor

18th Mayor of Cleveland
- In office 1863–1864
- Preceded by: Edward S. Flint
- Succeeded by: George B. Senter

Personal details
- Born: February 4, 1823 New York, U.S.
- Died: November 13, 1865 (aged 42) (date of death approximate) Pine Island, Minnesota, U.S.
- Resting place: Monroe Street Cemetery
- Party: Republican
- Spouse(s): Naomi Bronson Masters (1847—1862; died); M. Augusta Prull Masters (1862—his death)
- Children: Four

Irvine Uberto Masters (February 4, 1823 – November 13, 1865(?)) was an Ohio ship builder who served as the mayor of Cleveland, Ohio, from 1863 to 1864.

== Early life ==
Masters was born in New York and moved to Cleveland with his first wife, Naomi, in 1851.

== Political career ==
Masters became a trustee of Ohio City. He later helped William B. Castle negotiate the merger between Cleveland and Ohio City. Masters was a member of the Cleveland City Council and was the president of the City Council three times and officially welcomed Abraham Lincoln when he visited Cleveland in 1861. Masters defeated his successor, Edward S. Flint, because of his Republican views during the Civil War.

Masters resigned from office on May 17, 1864, when he was diagnosed with tuberculosis. He subsequently sold his part of Peck & Masters shipbuilding company.

== Personal life ==
Masters married Naomi A. Bronson on October 1, 1847. The couple had four children: Willis U. (born 1853; died September 1898), Harriet (born 1855; died April 1872), Main S. (born 1857; died February 1883), and Julius H. (born October 1860; died March 1862). Naomi Masters died on February 9, 1862. Masters then married M. Augusta Prull on October 27, 1863.

After resigning from the Cleveland City Council in May 1864, Masters moved to New England and then Nova Scotia to regain his health. His illness worsening, he moved to Pine Island, Minnesota, where he died a few days before November 14, 1865.

Irvine U. Masters' funeral was held in his former home in Cleveland on November 17, 1865. He was buried at the Monroe Street Cemetery in Cleveland.

Political offices
Preceded by Edward S. Flint	Mayor of Cleveland; 1863–1864	Succeeded by George B. Senter
