= Jack Gardner (musician) =

American jazz pianist (1903–1957)

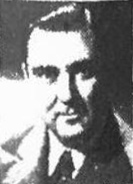
- Gardner in 1944

Background information
- Birth name: Francis Henry Gardner
- Born: August 14, 1903 Joliet, Illinois, U.S.
- Died: November 26, 1957 (aged 54) Dallas, Texas, U.S.
- Genres: Jazz
- Instruments: Piano

Francis Henry "Jumbo Jack" Gardner (August 14, 1903 – November 26, 1957) was an American jazz pianist.

== Career ==
Gardner played locally in Denver in the early-1920s, including with Doc Becker's Blue Devils and Boyd Senter's band. He moved to Chicago in 1923, where he led his own band in addition to playing with musicians like Wingy Manone, Jean Goldkette, and Gene Austin. He remained in Chicago through 1937, playing with Jimmy McPartland in 1936. Moving to New York City, he began associations with Sandy Williams's orchestra and Harry James, but returned to Chicago early in the 1940s, where he led his own group. In 1944, he recorded with Baby Dodds. He spent much of his later life playing in Dallas, Texas, where he died in 1957.

Gardner's compositions include the song "Bye, Bye, Pretty Baby," co-written with George Hamilton.
