= Leonard Case Jr. =

American philanthropist (1820–1880)

- Born: January 27, 1820; Cleveland, Ohio U.S.
- Died: January 6, 1880 (aged 59); Cleveland, Ohio U.S.
- Resting place: Lake View Cemetery, Cleveland, Ohio, U.S.
- Education: Yale (1842); Cincinnati Law School (1844)
- Known for: Endower of Case School of Applied Science; Founder of Yale's Scroll and Key
- Parent(s): Leonard Case Sr. Elizabeth Gaylord
- Relatives: William Case (brother)

Leonard Case Jr. (January 27, 1820 – January 6, 1880) was a philanthropist from Cleveland, Ohio, who endowed the Case School of Applied Science (later Case Institute of Technology, merging with Western Reserve University to become Case Western Reserve University).

== Biography ==
Case was born in Cleveland on January 27, 1820, in a house located on the corner of Superior Avenue and E. 6th Street (known then as Bank Street). In his youth, he was educated locally in Cleveland at Rev. Colley Foster's private school, located at St. Clair Avenue and Ontario Street, followed by preparatory study at Franklin T. Backus's classics school. Case entered Yale University in 1838, graduating in 1842 with honors in mathematics and languages and notably helped found the secret society of the Scroll and Key. He graduated from the University of Cincinnati Law School in 1844 and opened a law office in Cleveland in 1845 after passing the Ohio bar exam. He limited his practice to working with his father, Leonard Case Sr., in settling claims arising from Moses Cleaveland's Connecticut Land Company. His elder brother, William Case, served as Mayor of Cleveland from 1850 to 1851. Leonard stayed away from the Cleveland political life, although he did build and finance the Cleveland City Hall in the form of the "Case Block" located at Superior Avenue and East 3rd Street, leasing it to the city beginning in 1875. Later when asked why he continued to own the building, he was quoted by the Cleveland Plain Dealer as saying, "how to dispose of the property so that it shall most benefit the city has given me much concern, but on one thing I am determined. Not a dollar of it shall, so far as I can help, go into the hands of politicians to be mismanaged and wasted."

Leonard never married. Though he was ill for all his life, he was devoted to academic affairs. His most famous poem Treasure Trove, appeared in the Atlantic Monthly in 1860, whose literary standard remained high during the period. To the surprise of the publication, Leonard mailed back a substantial check he had received for his submission, requesting the money go to another author whose poem was featured in the same edition. The Editor of the Atlantic Monthly, wrote back saying: "Dear Sir:- Your note, returning the check for 'Treasure Trove,' reached me; and I can only now mingle surprise for so unexpected courtesy with acknowledgements for it. It may, perhaps, be something of a return for the pecuniary abnegation to learn that both Holmes and Saxe spoke highly of the poem..." The work was later published in 1873 by James R. Osgood and Company.

Leonard concealed his involvement in a work published in 1876 known as Vocabulary of English Rhymes: Arranged on a New Plan, paying and supporting fellow Yale alumnus, Samuel Weed Barnum, to devote two and half years to its creation. In a preface in the second addition dated January 10, 1896, the author's son, Thomas R. Barnum wrote: "it is proper to make a brief statement...in regard to the origin of the book. The late Leonard Case, Jr., of Cleveland, Ohio, Founder of the Case School of Applied Science...undertook to make for his friend, Dr. Alleyne Maynard of Cleveland, a rhyming dictionary arranged without regard to spelling, but according to the vowel sounds in the accented syllables of the rhymes. The result of Mr. Case's labor was embodied in a beautiful manuscript volume containing perhaps half of the words in this present Vocabulary...insisting that his own connection with the matter should be carefully concealed. This wish was scrupulously respected while Mr. Case lived, but now it is right to take this opportunity not only to acknowledge his share in the conception and execution of this work, but also to make grateful mention of one of those generous acts with which he quietly filled his life."

Case died at age 59 on January 6, 1880, after a coughing spell in his home on Rockwell Ave in Downtown Cleveland. His funeral was held three days later on January 9, 1880, inside his home, and he was buried in Erie Street Cemetery in Downtown Cleveland. In 1919, his body and those of his family were transferred to Lake View Cemetery in University Circle. The family monument still stands in Erie Street Cemetery.

== Endowment ==
Upon his death in 1880, $1.25 million was set aside for the founding of "The Case School of Applied Science", carried out by his confidential agent, Henry G. Abbey. Case specified the school teach the subjects of mathematics, physics, mechanical engineering, civil engineering, economic geology, mining and metallurgy, natural history, drawing, and modern languages. For any unforeseen needs in the future, Case wrote he would grant permission for adding "other kindred branches of learning".

On March 29, 1880, articles of incorporation were filed for the founding of the Case School of Applied Science. Classes began on September 15, 1881, first being held in the Case homestead on Rockwell Ave in Downtown Cleveland, before relocating to University Circle in 1885. With the merger with Western Reserve University in 1967, the Case surname remained, honored in the combined institutional naming of Case Western Reserve University.

== Writings ==
Treasure Trove (1873), illustrations by Sol Eytinge Jr. and engraved by Andrew Varick Stout Anthony
