= Edward S. Flint =

American politician

17th Mayor of Cleveland
- In office 1861–1862
- Preceded by: George B. Senter
- Succeeded by: Irvine U. Masters

Personal details
- Born: Edward Sherrill Flint; January 3, 1819 Warren, Ohio, U.S.
- Died: January 29, 1902 (aged 83) Cleveland, Ohio, U.S.
- Resting place: Lake View Cemetery
- Party: Democratic
- Spouse: Mary Woolsey
- Children: three

Edward Sherrill Flint (January 3, 1819 – January 29, 1902) was the mayor of Cleveland, Ohio, from 1861–1862.

Although Flint was born in Warren, he was raised by his grandparents in Vermont because of the early deaths of his parents. After local schooling, Flint started working as a bookkeeper. Flint and his family moved to Cleveland in 1851 where Flint started a real estate firm. Since he was always interested in railroads, Flint served as the superintendent of the CCC&I from 1859 to 1878. Flint became a member of the Cleveland board of schools in 1860 and was elected mayor in 1861. Flint, a Republican because of the Civil War, later realigned his views to that of a War Democrat; he supported the North's cause during the Civil War. He retired after being defeated for re-election, continuing the railroad business until 1878. Flint died in Cleveland and is buried in Lake View Cemetery.

Flint married Caroline E. Lemen (d. 1899) of Cleveland. They had three children: Carolin, Fanny, and William.

Political offices
Preceded by George B. Senter	Mayor of Cleveland; 1861–1862	Succeeded by Irvine U. Masters
