= George Hoadley (Ohio politician) =

American politician

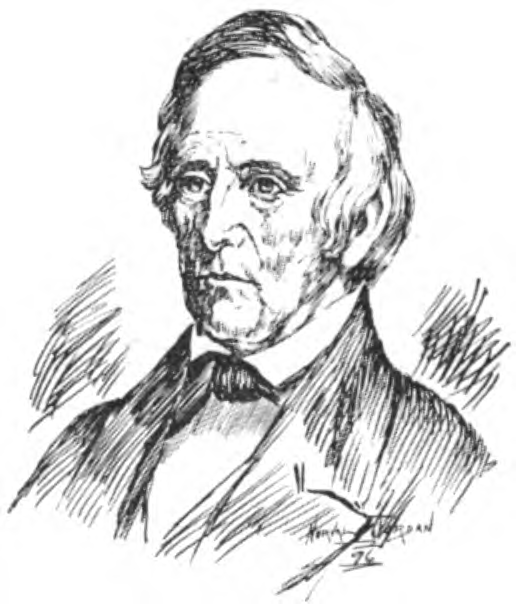

8th Mayor of Cleveland
- In office 1846–1846
- Preceded by: Samuel Starkweather
- Succeeded by: Josiah A. Harris

Personal details
- Born: December 15, 1781 Connecticut
- Died: February 20, 1857 (aged 75) Cleveland, Ohio, U.S.
- Resting place: Erie Street Cemetery
- Party: Independent
- Spouse: Mary Woolsey
- Children: George, three others
- Education: Yale University

George Hoadley (December 15, 1781 – February 20, 1857) was the fourth Mayor of New Haven, Connecticut from 1822 to 1826 and the eighth Mayor of Cleveland, Ohio in 1846.

Hoadley was born in Connecticut to Timothy and Rebecca (Taintor) Hoadley. Hoadley graduated from Yale University in 1801, where he studied law. He served as mayor of New Haven.

Upon William Woolsey's return to his business ventures in New York in 1825, he selected Hoadley to succeed him as Eagle Bank of New Haven president. The founders of the bank were too busy with other endeavors to oversee Hoadley. In September 1825, after Hoadley had loaned out nearly the entire value of the bank in inadequately collateralized loans, the bubble burst and the Eagle Bank of New Haven declared bankruptcy. In charge of their endowment, Yale College lost over $21,000, bringing the total value of the endowment down to $1,800. Unpaid debts for the college at the time amounted to well over $19,000, causing Yale president Jeremiah Day to obtain emergency sources of financing. The collapse of the bank was catastrophic to the City of New Haven, precipitating a depression in the local economy.

In disgrace, Hoadley quietly moved to Cleveland in 1830 and established his own law practice. Hoadley served as Justice of the Peace from 1832 to 1846 and was elected mayor for a two-year term in 1846.

The first high school for boys in Cleveland was opened in 1846 after Hoadley and his predecessor, Samuel Starkweather, worked to establish the first high school in Cleveland.

== Personal life ==
Hoadley was married 8 November 1819 in New Haven, Connecticut to Mary Ann Woolsey and had four children: Mary Ann, Elisabeth Dwight, George, who became governor of Ohio in 1883, and Laura.

Hoadley died in Cleveland and is buried in the Erie Street Cemetery. His wife, and daughter Laura, are buried in Highland Park Cemetery, Highland Hills, Cuyahoga Co, Ohio. His wife died 2 May 1871 in Cleveland and Laura died 21 June 1853 at the age of 18.

== Sources ==
- The Encyclopedia Of Cleveland History by Cleveland Bicentennial Commission (Cleveland, Ohio), David D. Van Tassel (Editor), and John J. Grabowski (Editor) ISBN 0-253-33056-4
- Swensen, David F. (2009). Pioneering Portfolio Management. New York, NY: Free Press. pp. 59–60. ISBN 978-1-4165-4469-2.

Political offices
Preceded by Elizur Goodrich	Mayor of New Haven, Connecticut; 1822–1826	Succeeded by Simeon Baldwin
Preceded by Samuel Starkweather	Mayor of Cleveland; 1846	Succeeded by Josiah A. Harris
