= John W. Allen =

American lawyer and politician (1802–1887)

John William Allen
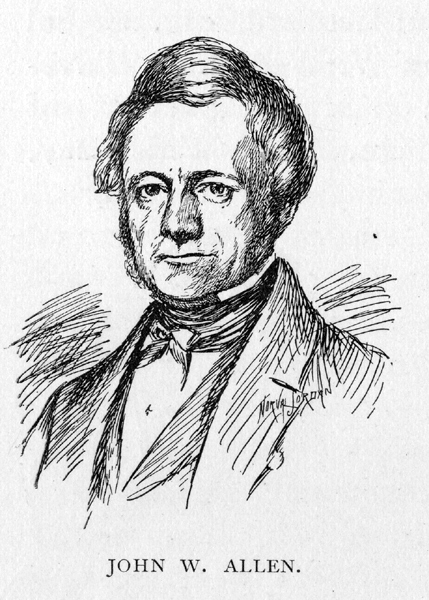

Member of the U.S. House of Representatives from Ohio's 15th district
- In office March 4, 1837 – March 3, 1841
- Preceded by: Jonathan Sloane
- Succeeded by: Sherlock James Andrews

Member of the Ohio Senate
- In office 1836-1837

Personal details
- Born: August 24, 1802 Litchfield, Connecticut, U.S.
- Died: October 5, 1887 (aged 85) Cleveland, Ohio, U.S.
- Resting place: Erie Street Cemetery
- Party: Whig
- Education: Harvard College (BA)

John William Allen (August 24, 1802 – October 5, 1887) was an American lawyer and politician from Ohio. He served two terms in the United States House of Representatives from 1837 to 1841 and also served as the fourth Mayor of Cleveland.

== Early life and career ==
John W. Allen was born in Litchfield, Connecticut in 1802. He was the son of Representative John Allen. He attended preparatory schools and moved to Chenango County, New York in 1818. He received a classical education and studied law.

Allen moved to Cleveland, Ohio in 1825, and studied law under judge Samuel Cowles and became a leader of the bar. He was president of the village from 1831 to 1835, a member of the board of directors of the Commercial Bank of Lake Erie in 1832, and one of the incorporators of the Cleveland and Newburgh Railway in 1834.

== Business and government positions ==
Allen was an organizer of the Ohio Railroad in 1836, and served in the Ohio State Senate 1836–37. He was elected to the 25th and 26th Congresses as a Whig, and served March 4, 1837 – March 3, 1841. He was elected Mayor of Cleveland in 1841.

== Later career and death ==
In 1845, Allen was elected president of the Cleveland, Columbus and Cincinnati Railroad, and was a delegate to the first convention on river and harbor improvement, held in Chicago in 1847. When the Whig party dissolved in the 1850s, he joined with the Republicans. He was appointed postmaster of Cleveland April 4, 1870, by President Grant, and was re-appointed in 1874, serving until he resigned January 11, 1875.

He died in Cleveland on October 5, 1887, and was interred at Erie Street Cemetery.

== See also ==
- List of railroad executives

Political offices
Preceded by Nicholas Dockstader	Mayor of Cleveland; 1841	Succeeded by Joshua Mills
Ohio Senate
Preceded by Frederick Whittlesey	Senator from Cuyahoga County; December 7, 1835-March 3, 1837	Succeeded by Simeon Fuller
