= Josiah Barber =

American mayor

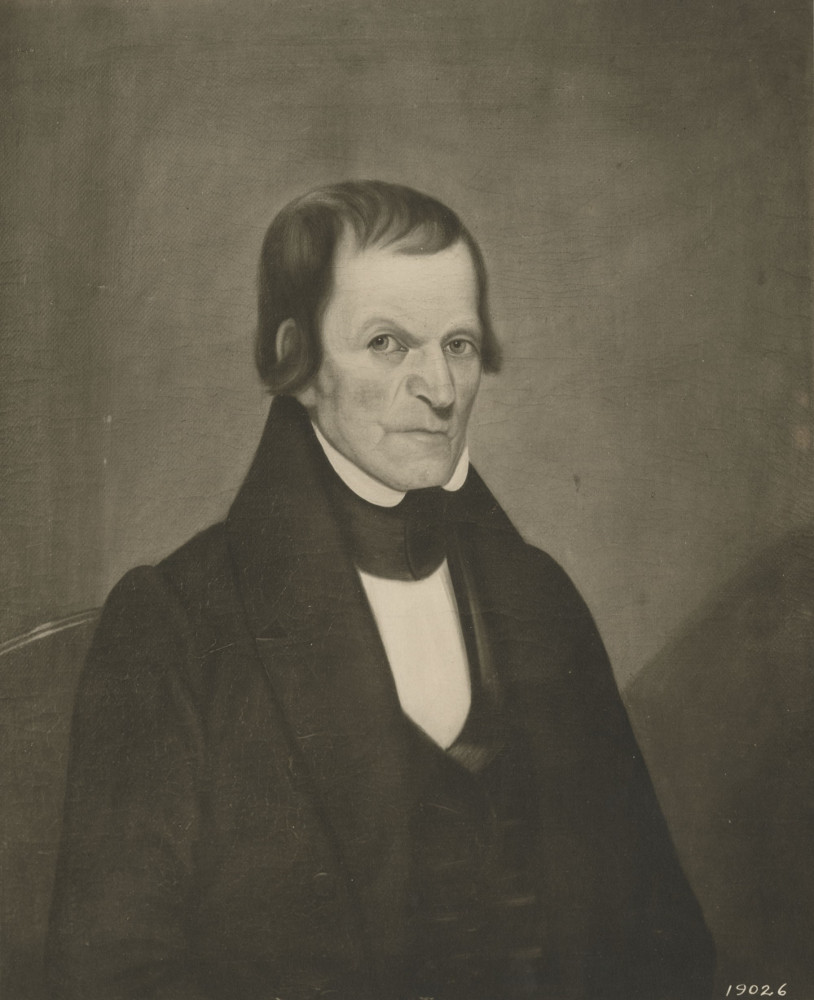

1st Mayor of Ohio City
- In office 1836–1837
- Preceded by: Position established
- Succeeded by: Francis A. Burrows

Personal details
- Born: Josiah Barber; May 22, 1771 Hebron, Connecticut
- Died: December 10, 1842 (aged 71) Cleveland, Ohio
- Resting place: Riverside Cemetery
- Profession: Real Estate Developer

Josiah Barber (22 May 1771 – 10 December 1842) was one of the preeminent early developers of Ohio City, what is today a neighborhood in Cleveland, Ohio, as well as being elected its first mayor in 1836.

== Early life ==
Josiah Barber was born in 1771 in Hebron, Connecticut, the son of Captain Stephen and Alice (Cass) Barber. In 1794, Barber married Abigail Gilbert, they had a daughter, Abigail G. Five years after the death of his first wife, in 1802, Barber would marry Sophia Lord, and they would have four children: Epiphras, Harriet, Sophia L., and Jerusha.

== Development of Brooklyn Township ==
In 1809, Barber's father-in-law, Samuel Lord, purchased a portion of the last division of Western Reserve lands extending along the western border of the Cuyahoga River to the lake. Barber and his brother-in-law, Richard Lord, receiving this land, took to developing and selling it in a new township.

Barber and his family first arrived in the area in 1818, constructing a log cabin on the corner of Pearl Street (now West 25th St.) and Franklin Avenue, which he would later replace with the first brick house in Cleveland. There, he began the selling of village lots and organizing the government of Brooklyn Township.

Barber served as a vice-president of the Cuyahoga County Colonization Society, favoring a gradual abolition of slavery, with the resettlement of the formerly enslaved to either Africa or South America. Barber also served as a vice-president of the short-lived Cuyahoga County Temperance Society during the 1830s.

With the increase in land speculation following the building of the Ohio and Erie Canal, Richard Lord and Josiah Barber officially formed a real estate partnership in 1831. The two began a redesign of Brooklyn Village in 1835, replacing the original public square plan with Franklin Circle, the first radial planning in Cleveland. Franklin Circle served as an open air farmer's market until its refurbishment as a public park in 1857.

Lord and Barber operated a store on the corner of W. 25th St. and Lorain in an attempt to draw in settlers. During this time, the two operated a distillery in Brooklyn Village, becoming its first industry until 1834, when they, among others, would incorporate the Cuyahoga Steam Furnace Company, the first manufacturing plant in Cleveland.

Along with Phineas Shepherd and Charles Taylor, Barber helped to organize St. John's Episcopal Parish in 1834. Barber would later be named a warden and vestryman of Trinity Parish during its incorporation in 1838.

== Mayor of Ohio City ==
As a means to address rapid urban growth, Ohio City was incorporated from Brooklyn Township on March 3rd, 1836. An election was held during the month of March, with Josiah Barber being elected mayor on March 30th, 1836. Barber, who had been appointed as a circuit judge in 1834, stepped down from that position to accept the role. Barber would go on to serve a single one-year term as mayor.

== Later Years ==
In 1840, Lord and Barber would set aside a tract of land for an open-air market on the corner of West 25th Street and Lorain, with the stipulation it would always be kept as a public market site. This tract which would later be the site of the West Side Market.

Josiah Barber died on December 10, 1842 at the age of 71. He was initially interred at the Monroe Street Cemetery, but was disinterred in 1882 and reinterred at Riverside Cemetery by his grandson, Josiah Barber, a cofounder of the cemetery. Barber Avenue in Cleveland's near-West Side was named in honor of him.

Political offices
Preceded by None	Mayor of Ohio City; 1836	Succeeded by Francis A. Burrows
