= Josiah A. Harris =

American politician

9th Mayor of Cleveland
- In office 1847–1847
- Preceded by: George Hoadley
- Succeeded by: Lorenzo A. Kelsey

Personal details
- Born: January 15, 1808 Becket, Massachusetts
- Died: August 21, 1876 (aged 68) Cleveland, Ohio
- Resting place: Erie Street Cemetery
- Party: Whig party
- Spouse: Esther M. Race
- Children: four

Josiah A. Harris (January 15, 1808 – August 21, 1876) was the ninth Mayor of Cleveland, Ohio in 1847.

Harris moved from Becket, Massachusetts in 1818 to North Amherst in Lorain County. Harris was elected sheriff of Elyria in 1832 and began the Ohio Atlas & Elyria Advertiser, a weekly newspaper. Harris moved to Cleveland in 1837 and purchased the Cleveland Herald and Gazette, where he proudly supported the Whig party. He was elected mayor 10 years later in 1847. He began to lose interest in the Herald and ended up quitting journalism altogether after the Civil War. He retired to a farm in Rocky River. Harris suffered a series of strokes and died at his daughter's home. He is buried in the Erie Street Cemetery.

Harris married Esther M. Race in 1830 and had four children: Bryon C., Brougham E., Zacharia, and Helen.

Political offices
Preceded by George Hoadley	Mayor of Cleveland; 1847	Succeeded by Lorenzo A. Kelsey
