= Abner C. Brownell =

American politician

13th Mayor of Cleveland
- In office 1852–1854
- Preceded by: William Case
- Succeeded by: William B. Castle

Personal details
- Born: 1813 Massachusetts, U.S.
- Died: 1857 (aged 43–44)
- Party: Democratic
- Spouse: Eliza Brownell
- Children: 4

Abner C. Brownell (1813–1857) was the mayor of Cleveland, Ohio from 1852–1854.

Brownell was born to Nathan C. and Elizabeth Adams Smith Brownell in Massachusetts where he was locally educated. Brownell moved to Cleveland in the 1840s and began working in the iron and glass industries employed by the W. A. Otis Co. He was then a partner in Wick, Otis, & Brownell, a banking firm. Brownell ran as a Democrat for city council in 1849 and won, serving in that capacity until 1852, when he ran unopposed for mayor. Brownell was the first mayor of Cleveland to serve two terms in office. Brownell left office and became a commission merchant until his death in 1857

Brownell was married to Eliza in the early 1830s. They had four children: Charles H., Cornelia G., John, and Wilford S.

Political offices
Preceded by William Case	Mayor of Cleveland; 1852–1854	Succeeded by William B. Castle
