= Nelson Hayward =

American politician

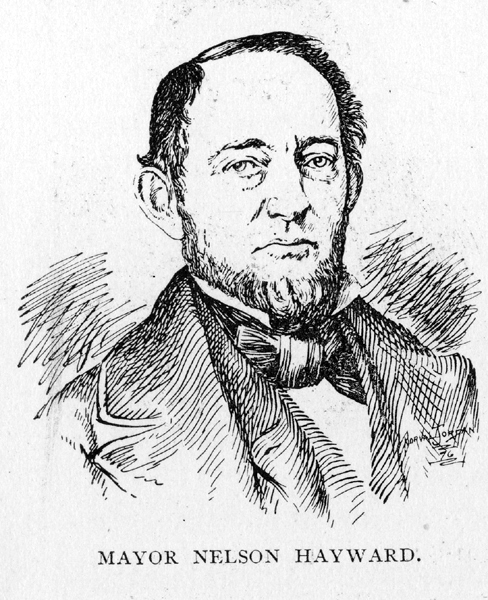

6th Mayor of Cleveland
- In office 1843–1843

Personal details
- Born: 1810 Braintree, Massachusetts, U.S.
- Died: April 14, 1857 (aged 46–47)
- Party: Democratic

Nelson Hayward (1810 – April 14, 1857) was the sixth Mayor of Cleveland, Ohio. He served only one term, in 1843.

Hayward was born in Braintree, Massachusetts to William and Marjory (Thayer) Hayward. He was educated in Massachusetts and came to Cleveland with his two brothers, Joseph and John, in 1825. In 1840, Hayward became the assistant chief of the Old Volunteer Fire Department. He was elected alderman in 1841 and 1842 and served as the vice-president of the city's Temperance Society in 1842. He was elected as mayor in 1843 because of his Jacksonian Democrat political philosophy. Hayward was not re-elected because the city's political views shifted to partisan Whig and Republican. In 1844 he became a members of the Cleveland Lodge of Odd Fellows. Hayward was never married.

Political offices
Preceded by Joshua Mills	Mayor of Cleveland; 1843	Succeeded by Samuel Starkweather
