= Nicholas Dockstader =

American politician

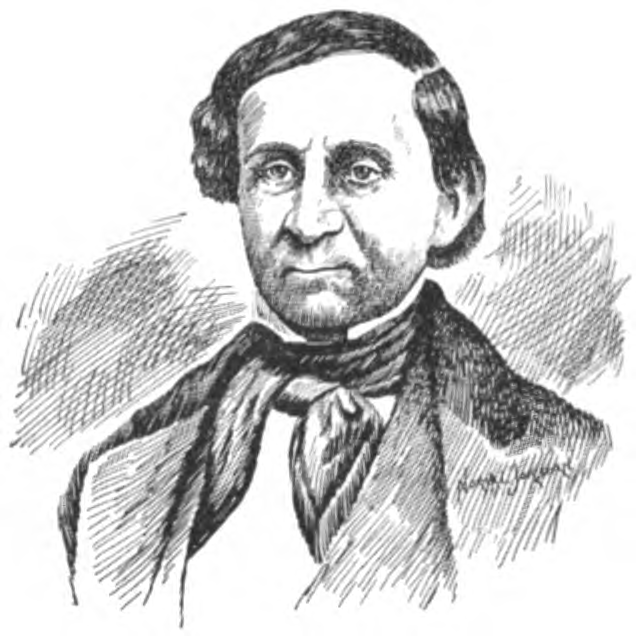

3rd Mayor of Cleveland
- In office 1840–1840
- Preceded by: Joshua Mills
- Succeeded by: John W. Allen

Personal details
- Born: January 4, 1802 Albany, New York, U.S.
- Died: November 9, 1871 (aged 69) Cleveland, Ohio, U.S.
- Resting place: Woodland Cemetery
- Party: Whig
- Spouse: Harriet Judd
- Children: five

Nicholas Dockstader (January 4, 1802 – November 9, 1871) was the third mayor of Cleveland, Ohio. He served only one year in 1840.

Dockstader was born in Albany, New York to Jacob and Angela (Hanson) Dockstader. Nicholas had two brothers, Richard and Butler. Dockstader and his brothers moved to Cleveland in 1826. He soon became the leading fur trader in the Northeast Ohio region after he began dealing hats, caps, and furs to the local Native Americans. In 1834 he became the treasurer of the Cleveland & Newburgh Railway. In 1835 Dockstader became the treasurer of the village of Cleveland. He was then elected alderman after the city was incorporated in 1836 and elected to that position again in 1838. From 1837 to 1838 Dockstader was chosen as a delegate to the county and state Whig conventions. It was because of this popularity that he was elected mayor in 1840. He served one term as mayor, after which he returned to private business.

Dockstader was married to Harriet Judd (1805–1837). Their 5 children were William, Richard, Charles, Julia, and Elisabeth. Dockstader died in Cleveland and is buried in Woodland Cemetery.

Political offices
Preceded by Joshua Mills	Mayor of Cleveland; 1840	Succeeded by John W. Allen
