= Flavel W. Bingham =

American politician (1803–1867)

11th Mayor of Cleveland
- In office 1848–1848
- Preceded by: Lorenzo A. Kelsey
- Succeeded by: William Case

Personal details
- Born: Flavel White Bingham; November 8, 1803 Utica, New York, U.S.
- Died: May 13, 1867 (aged 63) New Orleans, Louisiana, U.S.
- Party: Whig
- Spouse: Emmeline Day
- Children: 3
- Education: Union College

Flavel White Bingham (November 8, 1803 – May 13, 1867) was the 11th Mayor of Cleveland in 1849.

Bingham was born in Utica, New York, to Flavel Bingham and Fanny White. His parents died when he was an infant, and he was sent to live with his maternal grandfather, Daniel White, in Connecticut. He graduated from Union College in 1829, studied law, moved to Cleveland in 1837, and began Collins & Bingham, a law practice. He was elected to the position of city council president in 1845. He was elected alderman in 1847 and 1848 while still serving as city council president. He was elected mayor in 1849, served one year, and then returned to practicing law. Bingham was Cleveland's first probate judge, being elected in 1852 and serving until 1855. In 1863, Bingham left Cleveland for New Orleans, where he died in 1867.

Bingham married Emmeline Day, of Catskill, New York, on May 27, 1835. They had three children: Frances, Charles, and Edward.

Political offices
Preceded by Lorenzo A. Kelsey	Mayor of Cleveland; 1849	Succeeded by William Case
