= Joshua Mills (mayor) =

American politician (1797–1843)

2nd & 5th Mayor of Cleveland
- In office 1838 – 1839, 1842

Personal details
- Born: Joshua McFarson Mills; April 20, 1797 Francestown Township, New Hampshire, U.S.
- Died: April 29, 1843 (aged 46) Cleveland, Ohio, U.S.
- Resting place: Erie Street Cemetery, Cleveland, Ohio
- Party: Whig Party
- Spouse: Phebe Stafford Higby
- Children: Harriet Mills, John Willey Mills
- Profession: Physician

Joshua Mills (April 20, 1797 – April 29, 1843) was a pioneer medical doctor and an American politician of the Whig Party who served as the second Mayor of Cleveland, Ohio from 1838 to 1839 and later as the city's fifth mayor in 1842.

Born and raised in New England, Mills arrived to Cleveland in 1827 after receiving an education in medicine. As a physician, he established "the most successful pharmacy in the city" at that time. In 1832, Mills gained public recognition when his aid in Cleveland's 1832 Cholera Epidemic allowed him to secure a position as a member on the municipality's first Board of Health. In 1836, Mills became a Whig alderman, a member of Cleveland City Council and in 1837, council president. A year later, he was elected mayor of Cleveland. He was defeated by Nicolas Dockstader for reelection in 1840 and by John W. Allen in 1841. In 1842, he was re-elected as the city's fifth mayor.

Political offices
Preceded by John W. Willey	Mayor of Cleveland; 1838–1839	Succeeded by Nicholas Dockstader
Preceded by John W. Allen	Mayor of Cleveland; 1842	Succeeded by Nelson Hayward
