= Lorenzo A. Kelsey =

American politician

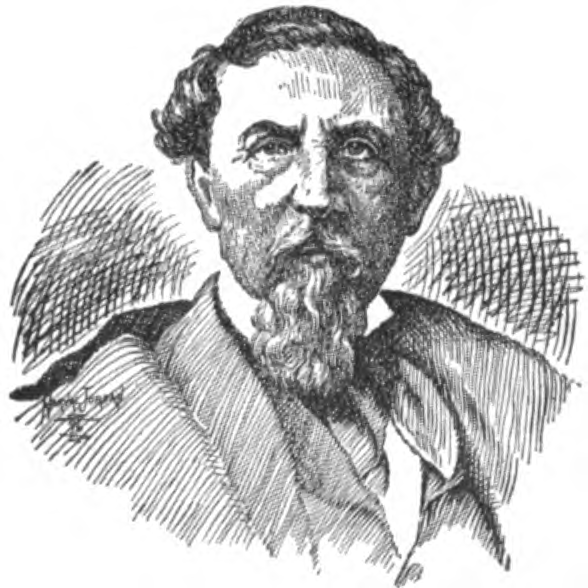

10th Mayor of Cleveland
- In office 1848–1848
- Preceded by: Josiah A. Harris
- Succeeded by: Flavel W. Bingham

Personal details
- Born: February 22, 1803 Port Leyden, New York, U.S.
- Died: February 13, 1890 (aged 86) Cleveland, Ohio, U.S.
- Resting place: Lake View Cemetery, Cleveland, Ohio, U.S.
- Party: Democratic
- Spouse: Sophia Smith
- Children: seven

Lorenzo A. Kelsey (February 22, 1803 – February 13, 1890) was the 10th Mayor of Cleveland, Ohio in 1848.

Kelsey was born to Eber and Lucy Ann Leete Kelsey in Port Leyden, New York, where he was locally educated. He later moved to Youngstown to work in the lumber industry. Kelsey and his wife, Sophia Smith (1806–1893), from Windsor, Connecticut, moved to Cleveland in 1837, after which he became the manager of the Cleveland House Hotel. After managing the hotel, Kelsey became captain of the USS Chesapeake and later the General Harrison. In 1848, Kelsey ran as a Democratic dark horse candidate due to his lack of political experience and defeated Charles Bradburn and Milo Hickox for the title of mayor. Kelsey returned to the hotel business in 1849 until his retirement. Kelsey died in Cleveland and was buried in the Erie Street Cemetery, until his remains were moved to Lake View Cemetery in 1903.

Kelsey and Sophia Smith had 7 children: Edgar (who died in infancy), Eugene, Antoinette, Theodore, Ada Helen, Josephine H., and Edgar A.

Political offices
Preceded by Josiah A. Harris	Mayor of Cleveland; 1848	Succeeded by Flavel W. Bingham
