= William Case =

American politician

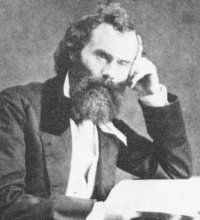

12th Mayor of Cleveland
- In office 1850–1851
- Preceded by: Flavel W. Bingham
- Succeeded by: Abner C. Brownell

Personal details
- Born: August 10, 1818 Cleveland, Ohio, U.S.
- Died: April 18, 1862 (aged 43)
- Resting place: Lake View Cemetery, Cleveland, Ohio, U.S.
- Party: Whig

William Case (August 10, 1818 – April 19, 1862) was an American politician of the Whig Party and served as the 12th mayor of Cleveland, Ohio from 1850 and 1851. He was the first Cleveland-born citizen to become mayor.

In his early career, he helped establish and became the first president of the Cleveland Library Association in 1846 (later the Leonard Case Reference Library, today the location of the Metzenbaum U.S. Courthouse). In 1850, he founded the short-lived Cleveland University in the city's Tremont neighborhood. He also served as president of the Cleveland, Ashtabula, and Painesville Railroad and secured the funding to finish its Chicago-to-Buffalo route. In 1846, Case was elected to Cleveland City Council and served as an alderman from 1847 to 1849. In 1850, Case was elected mayor of Cleveland as part of a "Rail Road Ticket" of Whig candidates who disfavored disturbing the location of the terminus of the Cleveland, Columbus and Cincinnati Railroad, defeating Democratic candidate and former City Council president Benjamin Harrington. In 1851, he was re-elected for another one-year mayoral term as part of a "Citizen's Ticket" of Whigs and Free Soilers, defeating challenger Robert Parks. During his tenure, Case "organized the city workhouse, poorhouse, and house of refuge, as well as the city finances." He is often credited with establishing the Cleveland nickname, "The Forest City", as a result of a citywide fruit-tree planting campaign.

== See also ==
- Leonard Case Jr., Case's younger brother who endowed the Case School of Applied Science (later Case Institute of Technology, merging with Western Reserve University to become Case Western Reserve University)

Political offices
Preceded by Flavel W. Bingham	Mayor of Cleveland; 1850–1851	Succeeded by Abner C. Brownell
