= Samuel Starkweather =

American politician

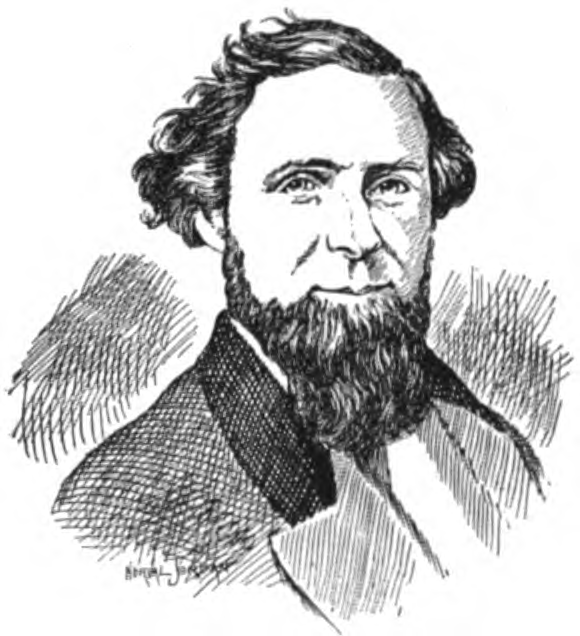

7th and 15th Mayor of Cleveland
- In office 1844–1845
- Preceded by: Nelson Hayward
- Succeeded by: George Hoadley
- In office 1857–1858
- Preceded by: William B. Castle
- Succeeded by: George B. Senter

Personal details
- Born: December 27, 1799 Pawtucket, Rhode Island, U.S.
- Died: July 5, 1876 (aged 76) Cleveland, Ohio, U.S.
- Resting place: Lake View Cemetery, Cleveland, Ohio
- Party: Democratic
- Spouse: Julia Judd
- Children: four
- Education: Brown University

Samuel Starkweather (December 27, 1799 – July 5, 1876) was the seventh mayor of Cleveland, Ohio from 1844 to 1845 and the fifteenth mayor of Cleveland from 1857 to 1858.

Starkweather was born in Pawtucket, Rhode Island to Oliver and Miriam (Clay) Starkweather. He graduated from Brown College in 1822, tutored there until 1824, and then left to study law in Windham, Connecticut. Starkweather was admitted to the bar in Columbus in 1826. Starkweather moved to Cleveland soon after and joined the Cleveland Grays in 1837, where he took a prominent position in Cleveland politics. Starkweather was elected mayor in 1844, won reelection in 1845, and again in 1857 for a 2-year term. He was the first judge of the Cuyahoga Court of Common Pleas elected under the new Constitution and served a 5-year term. Starkweather helped establish the first high school in Cleveland. He also promoted railroads in Cleveland and helped establish the Cleveland, Columbus and Cincinnati Railroad.

He was collector of the ports of Cleveland, and built a lighthouse of which he was superintendent in 1831. The US Treasury paid him $4,997.00 on the lighthouse and $113.30 for expenditures for it. The land cost $1,000.00. He also built a lighthouse on Turtle Island, Lake Erie, Port Clinton OH in 1832 for which the US Government paid him $1,068.43. The US Government also paid him in 1831 for the support and maintenance of the lighthouses, floating lights, beacons, buoys, and stakeages. He also built or established a marine hospital on which the US Treasury paid him $147.17.

Starkweather married Julia Judd on June 25, 1828. Their 4 children were Sarah, Samuel, William, and Julia. Starkweather is buried in Lake View Cemetery.

Political offices
Preceded by Nelson Hayward	Mayor of Cleveland; 1844–1845	Succeeded by George Hoadley
Preceded by William B. Castle	Mayor of Cleveland; 1857–1858	Succeeded by George B. Senter
