= John W. Willey =

American politician

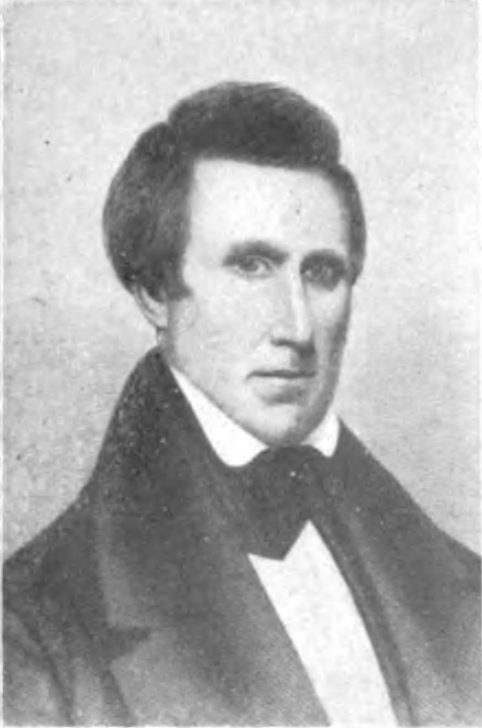

1st Mayor of Cleveland
- In office 1836–1837
- Preceded by: Position established
- Succeeded by: Joshua Mills

Personal details
- Born: John Wheelock Willey; 2 May, 1794 Goshen, New Hampshire, U.S.
- Died: July 10, 1841 (44) Cleveland, Ohio, U.S.
- Resting place: Lake View Cemetery, Cleveland, Ohio, U.S.
- Party: Democratic
- Profession: Lawyer
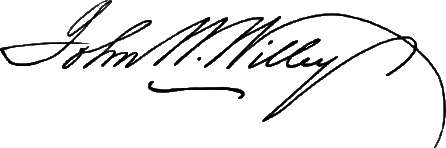
- Signature

John Wheelock Willey (1797 – July 9, 1841) was an American politician of the Democratic Party who served as the first Mayor of Cleveland, Ohio from 1836 to 1837.

== Biography ==
Born in New Hampshire, Willey was educated in Dartmouth, Massachusetts and studied law in New York. In 1822, he settled in Cleveland and began practicing law. He soon gained recognition as a witty debater, which earned him three years in the Ohio House of Representatives (1827–1830) and three more in the Ohio Senate (1830–1832) as a Jacksonian Democrat. Willey quickly became attached to Cleveland and was subsequently elected mayor for two terms after the city was chartered in 1836. Willey was "responsible for writing the municipal charter as well as many of the original laws and ordinances." In October 1836, Willey and a group of armed Cleveland militiamen confronted an angry mob from Ohio City (then an independent municipality) in the dispute over the Columbus Street Bridge that became known as the "Bridge War."

Political offices
Preceded by None	Mayor of Cleveland; 1836–1837	Succeeded by Joshua Mills
