= William B. Castle =

American politician

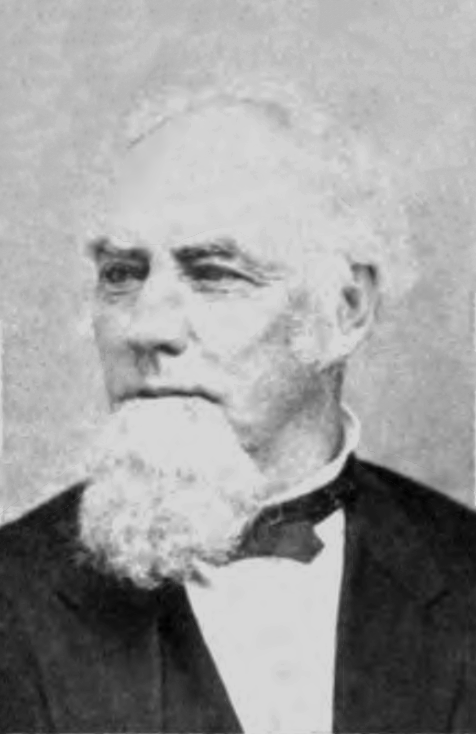

Personal details
- Born: November 30, 1814 Essex, Vermont, U.S.
- Died: February 28, 1872 (aged 57) Cleveland, Ohio, U.S.
- Resting place: Lake View Cemetery, Cleveland, Ohio
- Party: Whig
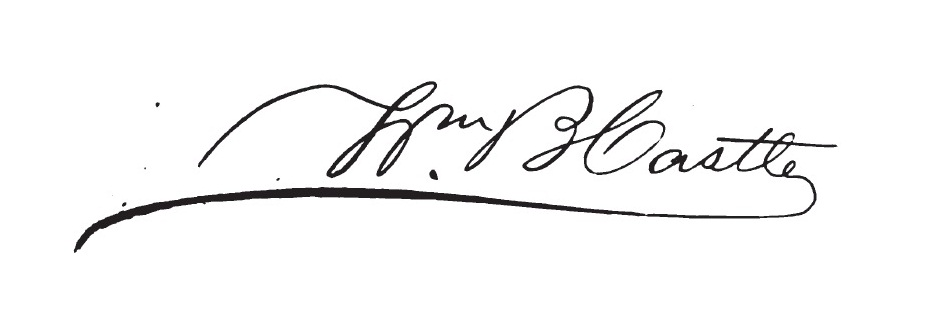
- Signature

William Bainbridge Castle (November 30, 1814 – February 28, 1872) was an American politician of the Whig Party who served as the 11th and final mayor of Ohio City from 1853 to 1854 and the 14th mayor of Cleveland, Ohio from 1855 to 1856.

Castle was born in Essex, Vermont. The family moved to Toronto in 1815, where his father, Jonathan Castle, was engaged as an architect "to superintend the construction of the first Parliament buildings there." In 1827, the family settled in Cleveland. Jonathan and William Castle opened Cleveland's first lumberyard. The elder Castle died two years later, leaving the business to his son.

He moved back to Ontario and then to Ohio City in 1839. He entered politics and quickly rose to prominence as a member of the Ohio City Common Council. In 1853, he was elected the city's mayor and assisted in authoring the 1854 agreement to merge Cleveland and Ohio City. In 1855, he became mayor of Cleveland.

On July 21, 1862, William B. Castle, as chairman of the District Military Committee, Cleveland, sent a letter to Governor David Tod, enclosing a copy of a resolution recommending that the appointment of company officers for the 103rd Regiment, Ohio Volunteer Infantry.

In December 1836, Castle married Miss Mary Derby, who died in Canada the following year. In 1840, he married Mary H. Newell of Vermont, by whom he had one son, W. W. Castle, and three daughters.

Mayor Castle was a delegate to Republican National Convention from Ohio in 1868.

William B. Castle was a longtime member of the Vestry and Senior Warden of the St. John's Episcopal Church (Cleveland, Ohio). There is a large historic marker on the eastern wall of the church in his honor. Dates for the marriages of his children are in the memorial stained glass windows of St. John's. Mayor Castle was interred beneath an obelisk in the Castle family plot at the Monroe Street Cemetery in Cleveland. He was disinterred at some later date, and re-interred at Cleveland's Lake View Cemetery beneath a funerary monument featuring St. John the Evangelist.

Political offices
Preceded by Benjamin Sheldon	Mayor of Ohio City; 1853–1854	Succeeded by None
Preceded by Abner C. Brownell	Mayor of Cleveland; 1855–1856	Succeeded by Samuel Starkweather
