= George B. Senter =

American politician

16th Mayor of Cleveland
- In office 1859–1860
- Preceded by: Samuel Starkweather
- Succeeded by: Edward S. Flint

Personal details
- Born: September 24, 1826 Connecticut, U.S.
- Died: January 16, 1870 (aged 43) Cleveland, Ohio, U.S.
- Resting place: Woodland Cemetery
- Party: Republican
- Spouse: Delia Wheaton
- Children: three

George B. Senter (September 24, 1826 – January 16, 1870) was the mayor of Cleveland from 1859 to 1860.

== Life and career ==
Senter was born in Potsdam, New York to David K. and Susan Senter. Senter was elected to city council from the 1st ward in 1858 and was then elected to mayor in 1859 serving until 1860. It is assumed, since there is no military record for Senter, that he served in the Civil War as assistant commissary-subsistence officer at Camp Taylor in Cleveland in April and May 1861. He was promoted to commandant of the camp in 1862 serving until 1864. When Irvine Masters, mayor of Cleveland, resigned his office in 1864, Senter was elected by city council once again to serve as mayor and finish Masters's term. Senter retired from political life to practice law and pursue the wine and liquor business.

He died in 1870 and was buried at Woodland Cemetery in Cleveland, Ohio.

Senter married Delia Wheaton in 1851 and they had three children: George B. Senter Jr., Cornelia E., and J. Augusta.

Political offices
Preceded by Samuel Starkweather	Mayor of Cleveland; 1859–1860	Succeeded by Edward S. Flint
Preceded by Irvine U. Masters	Mayor of Cleveland; 1864	Succeeded by Herman M. Chapin
