= Boyd Senter =

Boyd Senter was a multi-instrumentalist and band leader, most commonly associated with his jazz-era clarinet playing. He helped start the careers of Glenn Miller and The Dorsey Brothers. As a vaudeville performer, he headlined with his jazz band and as a solo performer, having mastered several instruments. His later years involved non-musical employment, but he remained active in the local music scene.

== Biography ==
Senter was born in Lyons, Nebraska, on November 30, 1899. His mother's name was Idella. He began learning the violin before he was old enough to go to school. He next learned the cornet, his mother claiming he learned it in "one lesson." A visiting carnival's bandleader took sick when Senter was twelve, and the youth was hired to lead the band in replacement. He attended Omaha Central High School. By the age of seventeen he was playing for pay in theatre accompanyment groups. Upon hearing recordings of The Original Dixieland Jazz Band he decided he wanted to become a professional musician.

He spent 1921 through 1922 leading his own band in Atlantic City. He then went on tour through the midwest, travelling as far as Colorado. This group gave Glenn Miller his start when he auditioned for them in 1922 at the age of 17. Quitting that, he joined the Chicago Deluxe Orchestra in 1923. In 1924 he was promoted as a "Jazzologist Supreme" and performed theatre dates where he performed solo on a wide variety of instruments. In the mid-20s he also went back to fronting his own "Senterpede" bands for the rest of the 1920s, recording for Okeh Records, Paramount Records, and Victor Records. Bandmembers included Jimmy Dorsey, Tommy Dorsey, Eddie Lang and Joe Venuti. About this time he married singer Edna Pierrou. He joined a 1927 touring theater production of "S. S. Syncopation" with a band christened the Riviera Jazz Jesters instead of Senterpedes. In the 1930s he directed the orchestra at Detroit's Colonial Theatre and headlined at variety Vaudeville shows, sometimes serving as master of ceremonies.

During World War Two he owned a factory which was contracted to the U.S. government doing defense work. Following the war he started another band in Detroit. He spent the 1950s and 1960s in Mio, Michigan running a bait-and-tackle shop named "Boyd's Sports Senter" while continuing to lead his Detroit band on weekends and continuing his "one man band" theater performances with less frequency as time progressed. During this period he also operated a traveling band instrument repair service.

Boyd Senter died in Oscoda, Michigan June, 1982.

== Style ==
A 1926 newspaper review called his theater performance "steaming music of the approved variety," noting his "wicked variations" on "St. Louis Blues". Variety in 1929 described Senter's version "In the Jailhouse Now" as "sizzling blues". Billboard reviewed a 1942 show by Senter as a mixture of entertainment and music that had "..the crowd stomping..." in an audience consisting of a high proportion of juveniles. His vaudeville performances were sometimes with his band, and sometimes as a solo act, often accompanied by Jack Russell.

Although most closely associated with the clarinet and saxophone, he also mastered the banjo, cornet, piano, trombone and violin in addition to several others. The clarinet playing that made him internationally famous was, according to Brian Rust, clowning, and diminished his reputational posterity among jazz aficionados. However, Rust considered Senter a performer with genuine jazz capabilities. In addition to Glenn Miller, Senter was instrumental in the beginnings of The Dorsey Brothers careers.

== Recording career ==
Senter first recorded for Autograph Records, making some of the earliest electrical recordings. These masters were released on Paramount Records, Pathé Records and Perfect Records. In 1927 he transferred to Okeh Records where he made some of his best-known recordings, including a drunken performance unreleased in America but which received distribution in Europe. Two years later he signed with Victor Records and made five sessions with them.

Senter appears as a sideman on recordings by The California Ramblers, Jelly Roll Morton, and Jimmie Rodgers.
