= Mayor of Cleveland =

Head of municipal government of Cleveland, Ohio, US

- Seal of City of Cleveland

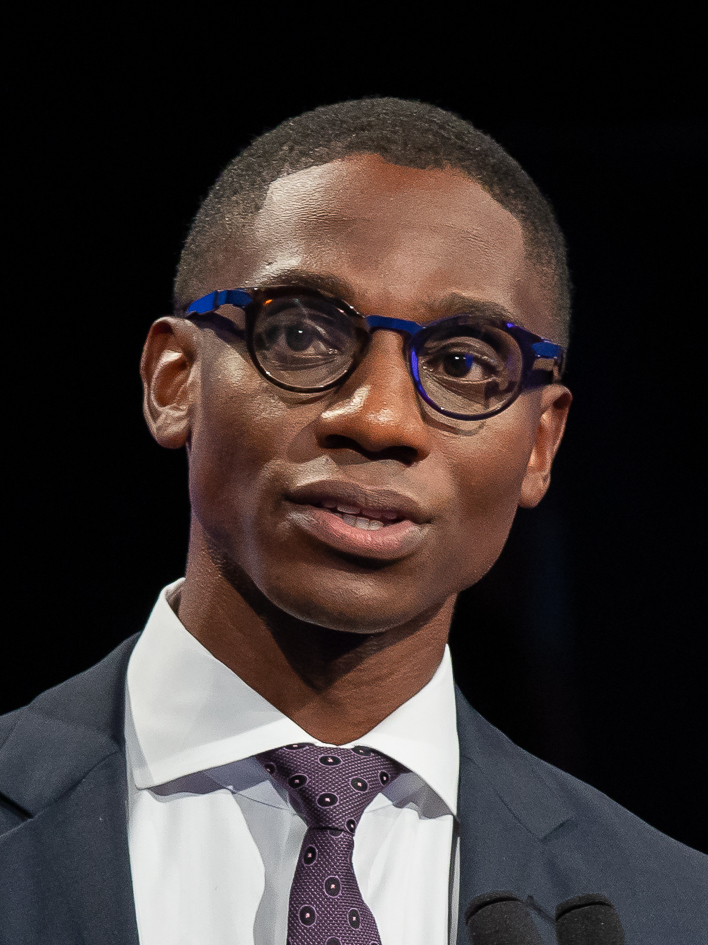
- Incumbent; Justin Bibb since January 3, 2022
- Style: The Honorable
- Seat: Cleveland City Hall
- Term length: Four years, no term limits
- Constituting instrument: Cleveland City Charter
- Inaugural holder: John W. Willey
- Formation: March 6, 1836
- Salary: $140,888.56 (in 2017)
- Website: Office of the Mayor

The mayor of Cleveland is the head of the executive branch of government of the City of Cleveland, Ohio. As the chief executive in Cleveland's mayor–council (strong mayor) system, the mayor oversees all city services and is "responsible for enforcing the city charter, city ordinances, and the laws of the State of Ohio." The mayor's office is located at Cleveland City Hall at 601 Lakeside Avenue in Downtown Cleveland. Since 1836, the city has had a total of 54 mayors, including the city's current mayor, Justin Bibb, encompassing 58 mayoral administrations, as four mayors have served in non-consecutive terms.

== History ==
Cleveland was established by General Moses Cleaveland and surveyors of the Connecticut Land Company on July 22, 1796. The settlement (then known as "Cleaveland", after its founder) was incorporated as a village on December 23, 1814. At this time, the position of municipal executive was the village president. Alfred Kelley was the first to be elected to that post in June 1815. When Cleveland became a city in 1836, it adopted a mayor–council form of government. John W. Willey was the city's first mayor.

Initially, Cleveland City Council had greater power in Cleveland's city government, but this changed with the adoption of the 1892 Federal Plan, which significantly strengthened the office of the mayor. When the plan was ruled unconstitutional in 1902 by the Supreme Court of Ohio, the powers of the mayor were lessened in the city's new municipal code. However, after the state granted Cleveland municipal home rule in 1912, the role of the mayor was enhanced in the 1913 municipal charter. When the city adopted a council–manager government in 1924, the city manager, selected by council, assumed the role of the municipal executive. However, the council–manager experiment was brief and, in November 1931, voters approved returning to the mayor–council system.

For much of Cleveland's history, mayoral elections were partisan, but in 1971, under the mayoral administration of Ralph Perk, the city amended its charter to make elections nonpartisan. The term of office for the mayor and members of council was traditionally two years, but was extended to four years in 1981 under Mayor George Voinovich. According to the Cleveland City Charter, there are currently no term limits for the mayor.

== Presidents, 1815–1835 ==
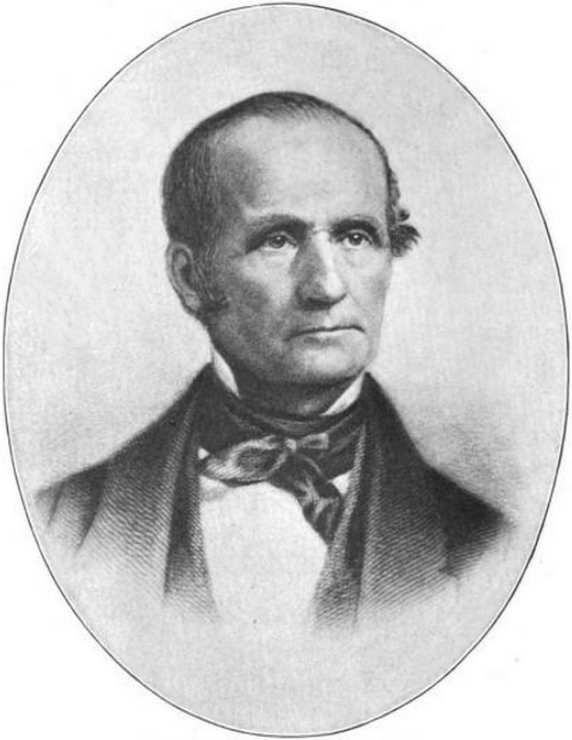
Alfred Kelley was elected the first village president of Cleveland (then known as "Cleaveland") in June 1815

#	President	Term start	Term end
1	Alfred Kelley	1815	1816
2	Daniel Kelley	1816	1819
3	Horace Perry	1820	1821
4	Reuben Wood	1821	1821
5	Leonard Case, Sr.	1821	1825
6	Eleazur Waterman	1825	1828
7	Oirson Cathan	1828	1829
8	David Long	1829	1830
9	Richard Hilliard	1830	1832
10	John W. Allen	1832	1835

== Mayors since 1836 ==
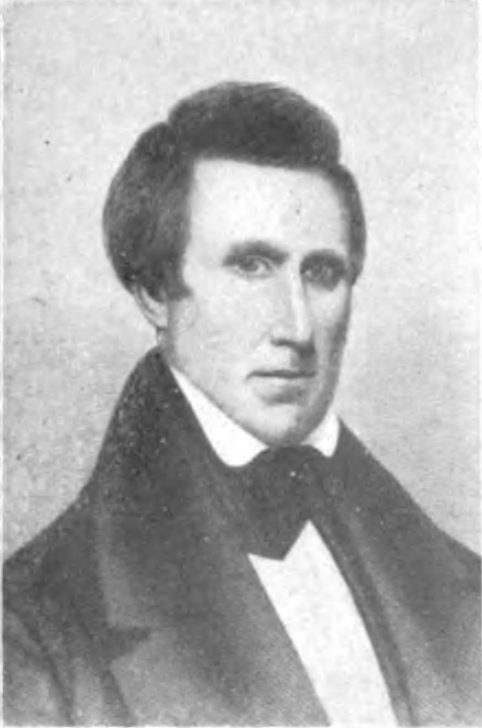
John W. Willey, the first mayor of Cleveland

#	Image	Mayor	Term start	Term end	Terms	Party
1		John W. Willey	March 6, 1836	December 31, 1837	2	Democratic
2		Joshua Mills	January 1, 1838	December 31, 1839	2	Whig
3		Nicholas Dockstader	January 1, 1840	December 31, 1840	1	Whig
4		John W. Allen	January 1, 1841	December 31, 1841	1	Whig
5		Joshua Mills	January 1, 1842	December 31, 1842	1	Whig
6		Nelson Hayward	January 1, 1843	December 31, 1843	1	Democratic
7		Samuel Starkweather	January 1, 1844	December 31, 1845	2	Democratic
8		George Hoadley	January 1, 1846	December 31, 1846	1	None
9		Josiah A. Harris	January 1, 1847	December 31, 1847	1	Whig
10		Lorenzo A. Kelsey	January 1, 1848	December 31, 1848	1	Democratic
11		Flavel W. Bingham	January 1, 1849	December 31, 1849	1	Whig
12		William Case	January 1, 1850	December 31, 1851	2	Whig
13		Abner C. Brownell	January 1, 1852	December 31, 1854	3	Democratic
14		William B. Castle	January 1, 1855	December 31, 1856	2	Republican
15		Samuel Starkweather	January 1, 1857	December 31, 1858	2	Democratic
16		George B. Senter	January 1, 1859	December 31, 1860	2	Republican
17		Edward S. Flint	January 1, 1861	December 31, 1862	2	Democratic
18		Irvine U. Masters	January 1, 1863	May 1864	2	Republican
19		George B. Senter	May 1864	December 31, 1864	1/2	Republican
20		Herman M. Chapin	January 1, 1865	December 31, 1866	1	None
21		Stephen Buhrer	January 1, 1867	December 31, 1870	1	Democratic
22		Frederick W. Pelton	January 1, 1871	December 31, 1872	1	Republican
23		Charles A. Otis	January 1, 1873	December 31, 1874	1	Democratic
24		Nathan P. Payne	January 1, 1875	December 31, 1876	1	Democratic
25		William G. Rose	January 1, 1877	December 31, 1878	1	Republican
26		Rensselaer R. Herrick	January 1, 1879	December 31, 1882	2	Republican
27		John H. Farley	January 1, 1883	December 31, 1884	1	Democratic
28		George W. Gardner	January 1, 1885	December 31, 1886	1	Republican
29		Brenton D. Babcock	January 1, 1887	December 31, 1888	1	Democratic
30		George W. Gardner	January 1, 1889	December 31, 1890	1	Republican
31		William G. Rose	January 1, 1891	December 31, 1892	1	Republican
32		Robert Blee	January 1, 1893	December 31, 1894	1	Democratic
33		Robert E. McKisson	January 1, 1895	December 31, 1898	2	Republican
34		John H. Farley	January 1, 1899	December 31, 1900	1	Democratic
35		Tom L. Johnson	January 1, 1901	December 31, 1909	5	Democratic
36		Herman C. Baehr	January 1, 1910	December 31, 1911	1	Republican
37		Newton D. Baker	January 1, 1912	December 31, 1915	2	Democratic
38		Harry L. Davis	January 1, 1916	December 31, 1919	2	Republican
39		William S. Fitzgerald	January 1, 1920	December 31, 1921	1	Republican
40		Fred Kohler	January 1, 1922	December 31, 1923	1	Republican
41		William R. Hopkins (Note: Although both Hopkins and Morgan held the position of city manager, the city recognizes them as the 41st and 42nd mayors respectively.)	January 1, 1924	December 31, 1929	3	Republican
42		Daniel E. Morgan	January 1, 1930	December 31, 1931	1	Republican
43		Ray T. Miller	January 1, 1932	December 31, 1933	1	Democratic
44		Harry L. Davis	January 1, 1934	December 31, 1935	1	Republican
45		Harold H. Burton	January 1, 1936	January 2, 1941	2 1/2	Republican
46		Edward J. Blythin	January 3, 1941	December 31, 1941	1/2	Republican
47		Frank Lausche	January 1, 1942	December 31, 1945	2	Democratic
48		Thomas A. Burke	January 1, 1946	December 31, 1953	4	Democratic
49		Anthony J. Celebrezze	January 1, 1954	December 31, 1961	4	Democratic
50		Ralph S. Locher	January 1, 1962	December 31, 1967	3	Democratic
51		Carl Stokes	January 1, 1968	December 31, 1971	2	Democratic
52		Ralph Perk	January 2, 1972	December 31, 1977	3	Republican
53		Dennis Kucinich	January 1, 1978	December 31, 1979	1	Democratic
54		George Voinovich	January 1, 1980	December 31, 1989	3	Republican
55		Michael R. White	January 1, 1990	December 31, 2001	3	Democratic
56		Jane L. Campbell	January 1, 2002	December 31, 2005	1	Democratic
57		Frank G. Jackson	January 2, 2006	January 2, 2022	4	Democratic
58		Justin M. Bibb	January 3, 2022	Incumbent	2	Democratic

=== Longest-serving mayors ===
Years in office	Term	Name
16	January 2, 2006 – January 2, 2022	Frank G. Jackson
12	January 1, 1990 - December 31, 2001	Michael R. White
10	January 1, 1980 - December 31, 1989	George V. Voinovich
9	January 1, 1901 - December 31, 1909	Tom L. Johnson
8	January 1, 1954 - December 31, 1961	Anthony J. Celebrezze
8	January 1, 1946 - December 31, 1953	Thomas A. Burke

== Mayors of Ohio City, 1836–1854 ==
Prior to its annexation on June 5, 1854, Ohio City was a separate municipality and a fierce rival of Cleveland. It had twelve mayoral administrations from 1836 to 1854.

#	Mayor	Term
1	Josiah Barber	1836
2	Francis A. Burrows	1837
3	Norman C. Baldwin	1838–1839
4	Needham M. Standart	1840–1841
5	Francis A. Burrows (second)	1842
6	Richard Lord	1843
7	Daniel H. Lamb	1844–1846
8	David Griffith	1847
9	John Beverlin	1848
10	Thomas Burnham	1849–1850
11	Benjamin Sheldon	1851–1852
12	William B. Castle	1853–1854

== See also ==
- Cleveland City Council
- County Executive of Cuyahoga County, Ohio
