= Robert B. Dennis =

American politician (1819–1884)

Member of the Ohio Senate from the Cuyahoga County district
- In office 1868–1872 Serving with Nelson B. Sherwin, Morris E. Gallup, Harvey W. Curtis, George A. Hubbard, William N. Hudson
- Preceded by: David A. Dangler, C. B. Lockwood, Morris E. Gallup
- Succeeded by: Henry M. Chapman, Harvey W. Curtis, William C. McFarland, George Nokes

Personal details
- Born: Robert Barclay Dennis; July 21, 1819 Pomfret, Connecticut, U.S.
- Died: March 24, 1884 (aged 64) Cleveland, Ohio, U.S.
- Resting place: Lake View Cemetery; Cleveland, Ohio, U.S.
- Party: Republican
- Spouse(s): Harriet Frances Congdon (died 1868) Emily Kent
- Children: 2
- Occupation: Politician; lawyer; newspaper founder

Robert Barclay Dennis (July 21, 1819 – March 24, 1884) was an American politician from Ohio. He served as a member of the Ohio House of Representatives, representing Cuyahoga County from 1868 to 1872.

== Early life ==
Robert Barclay Dennis was born on July 21, 1819, on a farm in Pomfret, Connecticut. His parents were Quakers. He graduated the Friend's School (later the Moses Brown Academy) in Providence, Rhode Island. He moved to Cleveland, Ohio, around 1839. He studied law and was admitted to the bar in 1844.

== Career ==
In 1846, Dennis established the Ohio American, the first anti-slavery paper in Ohio. It later became The Cleveland Leader. He was the projector of the Canton & Coshocton Railroad. He was city solicitor in Cleveland.

Dennis was a Republican. He was a member of the Ohio House of Representatives, representing Cuyahoga County from 1868 to 1872. He was defeated by A. J. Cunningham for the Speaker of the House. He served as speaker pro tempore and as chairman of the judiciary committee. He advocated for the Fifteenth Amendment to the United States Constitution.

== Personal life ==
Dennis married his cousin Harriet Frances Congdon of Hampton, Connecticut. They had two children, Harold Dale (1849–1913) and Edward Bennet (1851–1852). His wife died in 1868. He later married Emily Kent.

Dennis died on March 23, 1884, at his home in Cleveland. He was buried at Lake View Cemetery in Cleveland.
