= John Huntington =

American industrialist and philanthropist

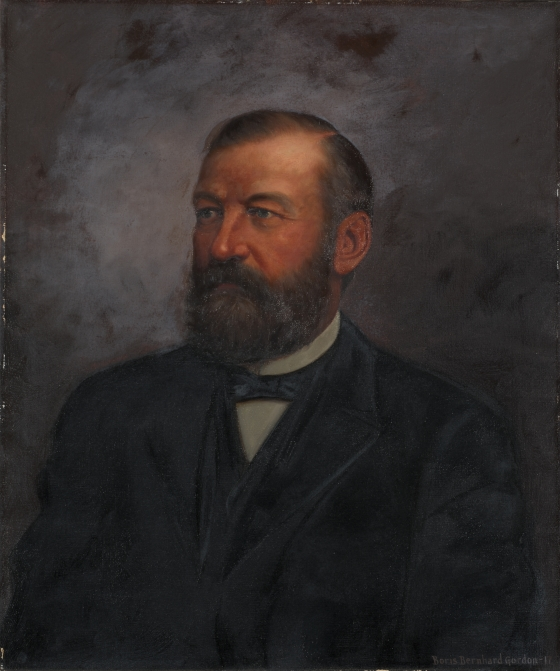
- Born: March 8, 1832; Preston, Lancashire, England
- Died: January 10, 1893 (aged 60); London, England
- Burial place: Lake View Cemetery
- Occupations: Industrialist, philanthropist

John P. Huntington (March 8, 1832 – January 10, 1893) was an American industrialist and philanthropist. Associated with John D. Rockefeller's Standard Oil, he was prominent in the business affairs of Cleveland's oil industry. Among other philanthropic activities, funds which he left in a bequest were combined with those of Hinman Hurlbut and Horace Kelley to establish the Cleveland Museum of Art in 1913.

== Biography ==
Huntington was born in Preston, Lancashire, England on March 8, 1832. His father, Hugh Huntington, was a professor of mathematics who founded a school in Preston. John, with his wife Jane Beck whom he married in 1852, immigrated to Cleveland, Ohio, in 1854 and worked as a contractor in slate roofing. He was employed at Clark, Payne & Co., an oil refining firm, in 1863, until its takeover by Standard Oil in 1870. Other business endeavors included gaining partial ownership of a fleet of lake ships in 1886 and becoming vice-president of the Cleveland Stone Company. He also filed many patents for improvements to furnaces, oil refinery, and machinery for producing oil barrels.

An active participant in the municipal affairs of Cleveland, Huntington served as a member of the Cleveland City Council for 13 years (beginning in 1862). In his tenure as a city councilman, he supported the creation of a paid fire department and a city sewer system, the deepening of the Cuyahoga River channel, and the construction of the Superior Viaduct (which closed in 1920, following the opening of the Detroit–Superior Bridge).

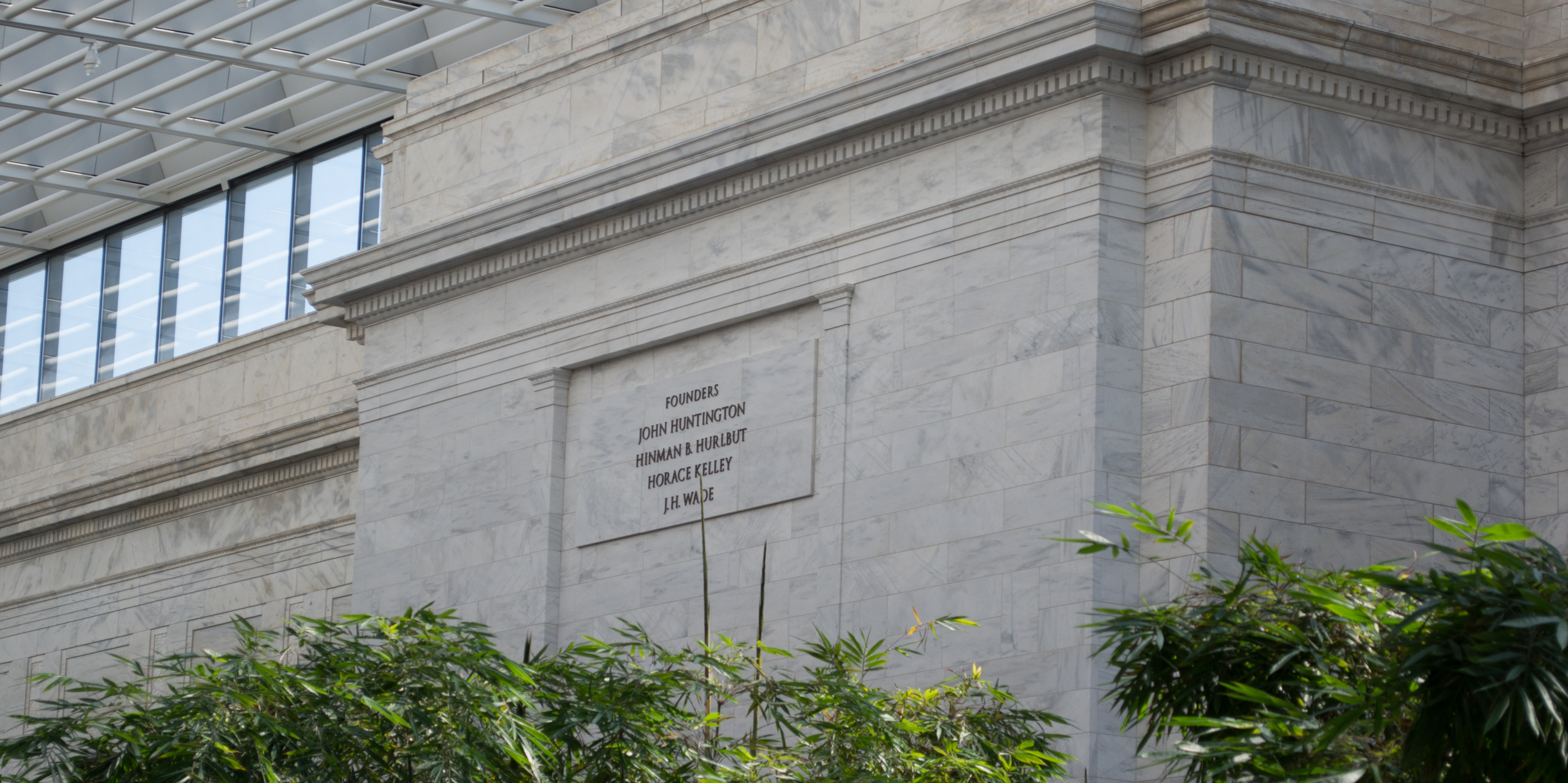
The Cleveland Museum of Art displays its founders names on a plaque in the Ames Family Atrium

Huntington was also a hobby philatelist. After his tour of Europe and marriage to Mariette L. Goodwin (following his first wife's death in 1882), he turned his interests towards collecting art. He formed the John Huntington Benevolent Trust on his fifty-seventh birthday in 1889. The fund was mostly based on 500 shares of his Standard Oil stock, and it provided charity to more than 40 cultural and educational institutions.

In his will written in 1889, Huntington established the John Huntington Art and Polytechnic Trust with the goal of producing a "gallery and museum" and a "free evening polytechnic school". The trustee of his estate, Henry Clay Ranney, was also the trustee for the estates of Hinman Hurlbut and Horace Kelley; Ranney channeled the bequests from all three estates toward the establishment of the Cleveland Museum of Art. Huntington was also a member of several fraternal orders; he received the 32nd Degree from the Scottish Rite, and was affiliated with the Independent Order of Odd Fellows and the Knights of Pythias.

With Jane Beck, Huntington raised five children to adulthood, including his son W.R. Huntington who later became a prominent industrialist of the Lorain County area. John Huntington, along with his family, were members of the Episcopal Church. He also owned a hobby farm on Lake Erie on which he built many structures including a house, a steam pump irrigation system, and a water tower. After his death in 1893, the Cleveland Metropolitan Park System purchased the lakefront property and named it the Huntington Reservation in his honor. He is buried at Lake View Cemetery in Cleveland.
