= Horace Kelley =

American industrialist and philanthropist

- Born: July 18, 1819; Cleveland, Ohio, United States
- Died: December 4, 1890 (aged 71); Cleveland, Ohio, United States
- Burial place: Lake View Cemetery
- Occupation(s): Industrialist, philanthropist
- Known for: Founding of the Cleveland Museum of Art

Horace A. Kelley (July 18, 1819 – December 4, 1890) was an American industrialist and philanthropist.

Kelley was born in Cleveland, Ohio and raised on Kelleys Island after the death of his father in 1823. Inheriting a fortune of real estate as well as ownership of most of Kelleys Island from his family, Kelley held interests in limestone and lumber on the island. Upon selling these interests in 1845 and returning to Cleveland, he worked as an investor and manager of real estate properties in both Cleveland and throughout Ohio.

Through his will, Kelley left funds for acquiring land for a fire proof art gallery and an art school that would help found the Cleveland Museum of Art in 1916. He is considered to be one of the founders of the museum along with John Huntington, Hinman Hurlbut, and Jeptha Wade II.

== Biography ==
Horace A. Kelley was born on July 18, 1819, in Cleveland, Ohio, United States, as the only child of mother Betsey Gould Kelley and father Joseph Reynolds Kelley. Kelley's father, a successful businessman, left a fortune mostly made up of real estate in Cleveland to Horace after his death in 1823. Kelley was then raised by his uncle Thomas M. Kelley on Kelleys Island, Ohio. His uncle worked as a merchant involved in trade through Lake Erie and Lake Ontario, and later in the banking and real estate businesses. Kelley also had another uncle, Alfred Kelley, who was a banker and prominent figure in Ohio's politics of the first half of the 19th century.

Kelley was known to have attended a Cleveland classical preparatory school established by Franklin Thomas Backus upon Backus leaving Yale College in 1836. Upon the death of his uncle, ownership of much of Kelleys Island was passed down to him. He sold his interests in limestone and lumber on the island in 1845, and returned to Cleveland. In Cleveland, he increased his wealth by investing in and managing real estate both in the city and off the shore of Lake Erie on the Isle of St. George (present-day North Bass Island). There, he was described as a man of "habitual reserve" by the Cleveland Plain Dealer.

Kelley married Fannie Miles, who was from Elyria, Ohio. They did not have any children, and lived between their Cleveland residence on Wilson Avenue and a home in California. He died on December 4, 1890, in Cleveland, and is buried at Lake View Cemetery.

== Philanthropy ==
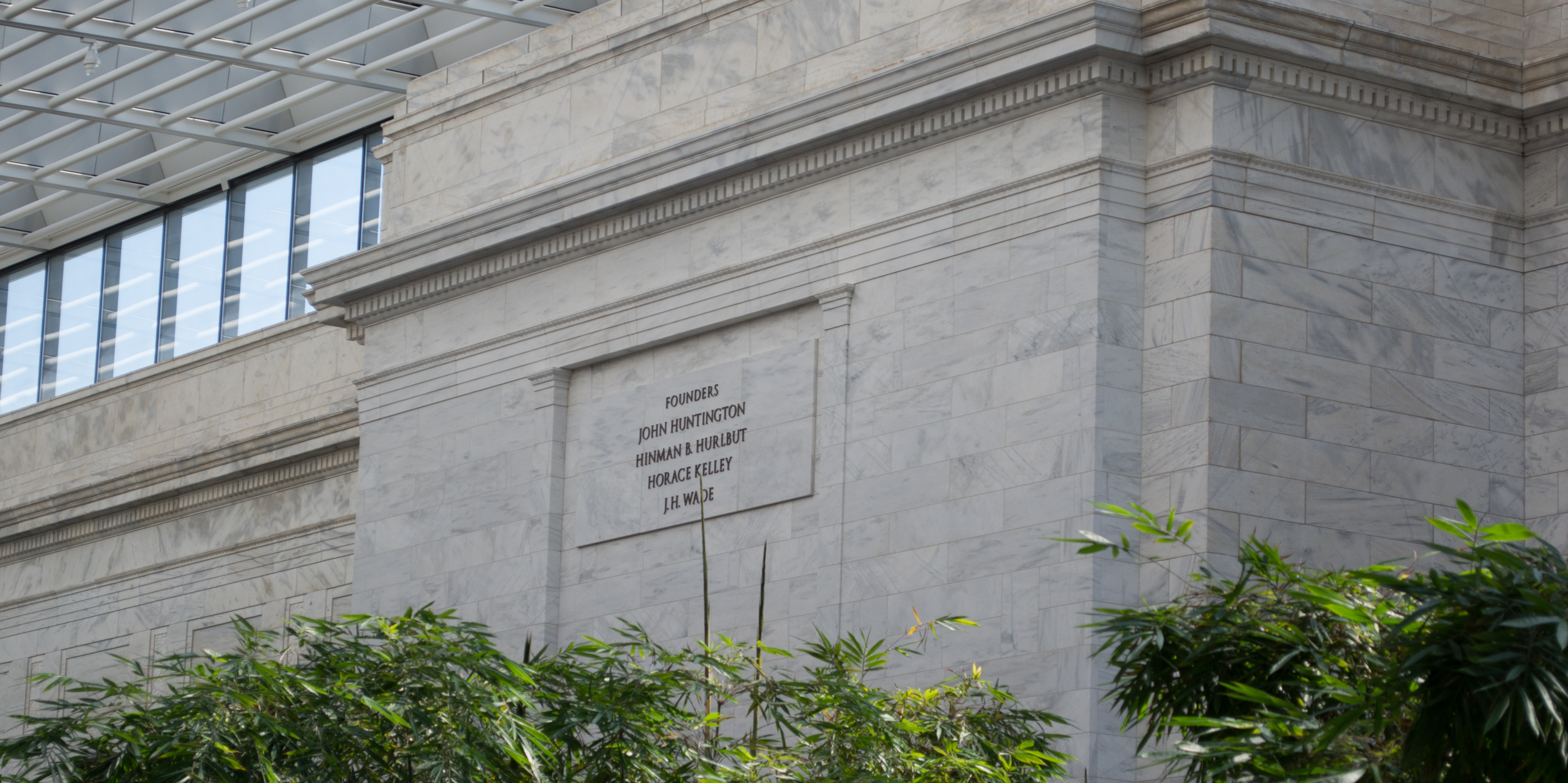
The Cleveland Museum of Art displays its founders names on a plaque in the Ames Family Atrium

Kelley's interest in art originated from his wife's passion for art. He made his first trip to Europe in 1868 for health reasons, where he was first exposed to art museums. He made four more trips to Europe and collected artwork that would later become part of the Cleveland Museum of Art.

Eight days before his death, Kelley signed a will that would leave a majority of his estate for an art gallery. Through his will, an excess of half a million dollars was bequeathed to acquire land for a fire proof art gallery and an art school, part of which would help to establish the Cleveland Museum of Art. He viewed the art gallery as a place that would attract gifts of artwork and sums of money, suggesting to name the gallery the "National Gallery of Fine Arts". He conditioned that "no work of art unless of acknowledged merit" be admitted into the gallery. He named three trustees to his estate: his cousin Alfred S. Kelley, judge James M. Jones, and Henry C. Ranney, a lawyer and trustee of the estates of Cleveland Museum of Art founders Hinman Hurlbut and John Huntington. These two businessmen and Kelley made their separate bequests to the museum without telling each other.

After Kelley's death, these trustees helped to establish a nonprofit corporation that incorporated the funds of his estate and was named the Cleveland Museum of Art, in 1899. The corporation was formed for the purpose of "promoting the fine arts" and establishing and maintaining an art museum. The corporation faced legal difficulties due to the John Huntington Art and Polytechnic Trust, another corporation formed through the will of John Huntington, which had also independently provided funds for the purpose of establishing an art museum. In 1913, the two corporations finally reached an agreement to establish a single art museum in cooperation. Under the agreement, the name of the Kelley corporation was changed to the Horace Kelley Art Foundation, while a separate corporation responsible for the establishing the museum was formed and named the Cleveland Museum of Art. This new corporation, under the combined resources of the Kelley and Huntington estates, commenced the construction of the museum in May 1913, and formally opened it to the public on June 6, 1916.

Kelley is considered one of the founders of the Cleveland Museum of Art, along with John Huntington, Hinman Hurlbut, and Jeptha Wade II.

== See also ==
- Hinman Hurlbut
- John Huntington
