= Morris E. Gallup =

American politician (1825–1893)

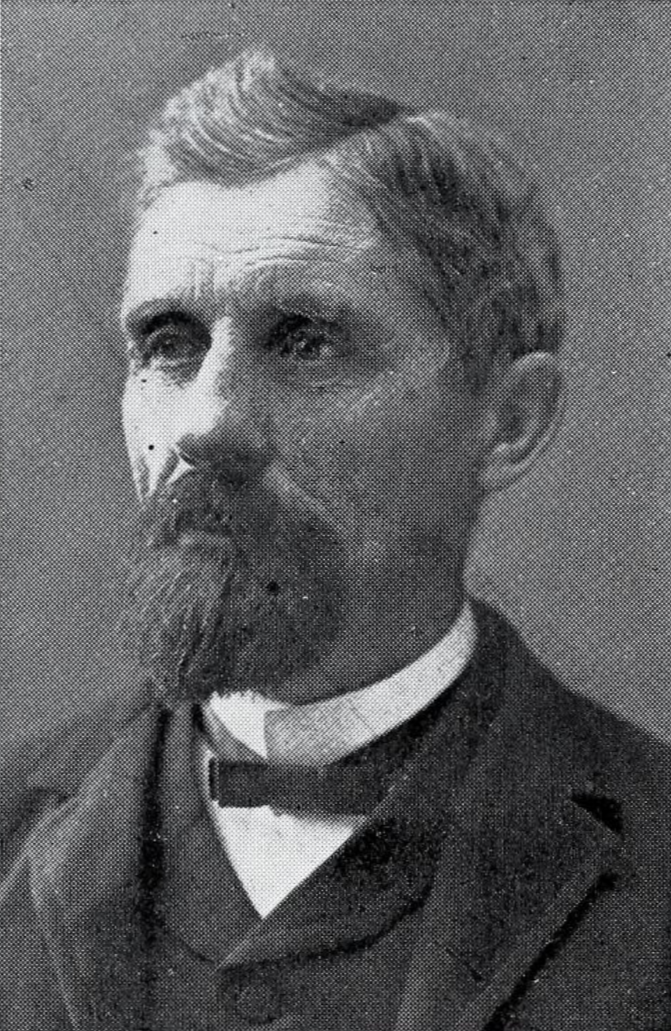
- Gallup in 1901 publication

Member of the Ohio House of Representatives from the Cuyahoga County district
- In office 1866–1870 Serving with David A. Dangler, C. B. Lockwood, Nelson B. Sherman, Robert B. Dennis
- Preceded by: Charles H. Babcock, Azariah Everett, Charles B. Lockwood
- Succeeded by: Harvey W. Curtis, Robert B. Dennis, George A. Hubbard, William N. Hudson

Personal details
- Born: April 12, 1825 Ashland, Ohio, U.S.
- Died: December 26, 1893 (aged 68) Illinois, U.S.
- Spouse: Nancy A. Sutherland (m. 1849)
- Children: 10
- Occupation: Politician; businessman; farmer; writer

Morris E. Gallup (April 12, 1825 – December 26, 1893) was an American politician from Ohio. He was a member of the Ohio House of Representatives, representing Cuyahoga County from 1866 to 1870.

== Early life ==
Morris E. Gallup was born on April 12, 1825, in Ashland, Ohio, to Vilaty (née Pomeroy) and Josiah Gallup. He moved to Strongsville in 1833. From 1841 to 1845, Gallup worked at the store of Lyman Strong in Seville. Around 1845, Gallup returned to Strongsville and worked at the store of his uncle Alanson Pomeroy. In 1846, Gallup was listed on Strongsville's enrollment list for the Mexican–American War. In 1847, he attended Ashland Academy.

== Career ==
Around 1848, Gallup returned to partner with his uncle on a general store in Strongsville. He then worked with his brother Milton in the mercantile business. In 1870, he bought his uncle's stock and partnered with his son John on a mercantile business.

In 1849, Gallup was elected treasurer of Strongsville. He held the role 24 years, including from 1871 to 1888. He was also township trustee and justice of the peace. He served as a member of the Ohio House of Representatives, representing Cuyahoga County from 1866 to 1870. In 1876, Gallup wrote A History of Strongsville.

In 1887, the family turned the mercantile business over to creditors. In 1890, Gallup and his family moved to Mount Vernon, Illinois, and engaged in farming until his death.

== Personal life ==
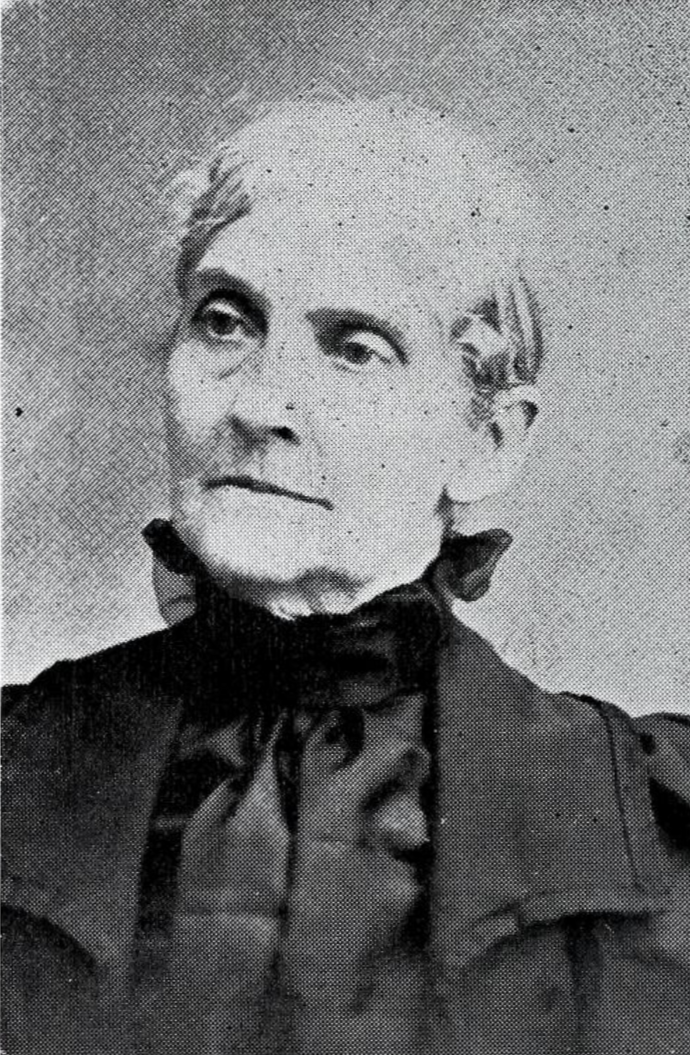
Photo of Nancy Gallup in 1901 publication

Gallup married Nancy A. Sutherland on December 25, 1849. She was born in 1828 in North Greece, New York. They had 10 children, Frank C., John, Mary E., Arthur L., Charles H., Alice, Mabel, Ellen, Lucy and a child that died in infancy.

Gallup died of pneumonia on December 26, 1893, in Illinois.
