= Gertrude Harrison =

American golfer (1871–1938)

Gertrude MacAdams Harrison (1871 – January 3, 1938) was the first female golf professional.

She was born Gertrude MacAdams in 1871. About 1928, she invented a device which returned golf balls driven into a driving net to the feet of the golfer.

Harrison died suddenly of natural causes at the golf school she ran in Cleveland, Ohio. She was buried in Lake View Cemetery in Cleveland.
