= Hinman Hurlbut =

American industrialist and philanthropist

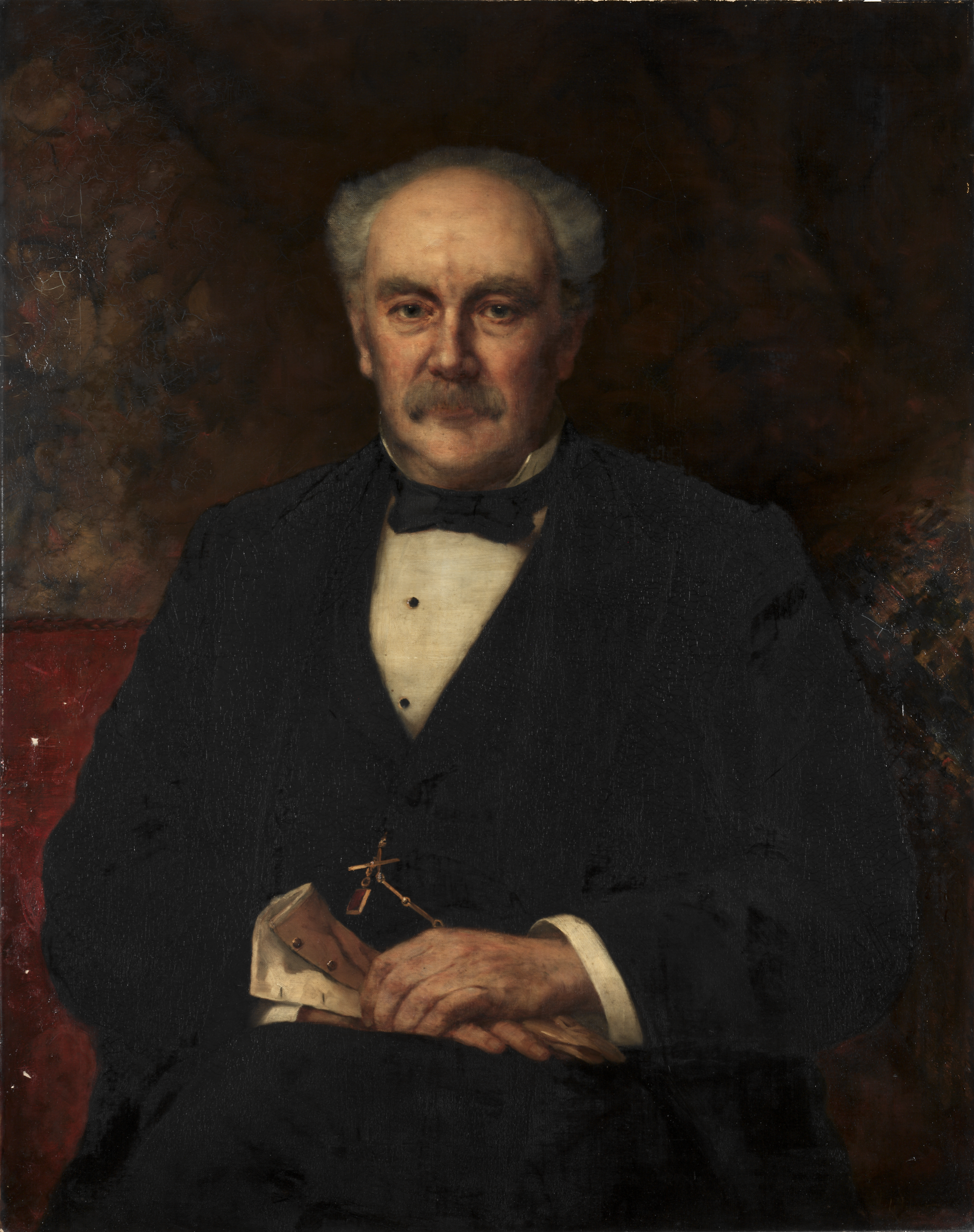
- Portrait by John Harrison Witt
- Born: July 20, 1819; St. James County, New York, United States
- Died: March 22, 1884 (aged 64)
- Burial place: Lake View Cemetery, Cleveland, Ohio
- Occupation: Industrialist
- Known for: Founding of the Cleveland Museum of Art

Hinman B. Hurlbut (July 20, 1819 – March 22, 1884) was an American industrialist. A native of New York, Hurlbut relocated to Cleveland, Ohio, in 1837 and started a career privately practicing law in Massillon, Ohio after being admitted to the bar in 1839. After a lucrative career as a lawyer, he found success as a business leader in Cleveland and came to own four national banks by 1863.

Hurlbut endowed the Lakeside Hospital, today part of the University Hospitals of Cleveland, and left funds through his will that would later help establish the Cleveland Museum of Art. He is considered one of the founders of the museum with John Huntington, Horace Kelley, and Jeptha Wade II.

== Early life ==
Hinman B. Hurlbut was born on July 20, 1819, in St. James County, New York, to mother Mary Barrett Hurlbut and father Abiram Hurlbut. His father Abiram was a farmer and moved from Connecticut, where his family resided, to New York. Through his mother's side of the family, Hurlbut is a relative of Governor Hinman, a colonial ruler of Connecticut.

== Law practice and business ventures ==
In 1837, Hurlbut relocated to Cleveland, Ohio, where he worked in his brother's law office and in 1839 was admitted to the bar. After being admitted to the bar, Hurlbut opened his own law office in Massillon, Ohio in 1839, and entered private practice in partnership with David Kellogg Cartter. He married Jane Elisabeth Johnson (1818–1910) on May 25, 1840, and the family lived in a house on Euclid Avenue in Cleveland. He stopped practicing in 1852 after a lucrative career as lawyer, and thenceforth became more involved in banking.

Hurlbut returned to Cleveland in 1852, where he opened his first bank. He purchased the Toledo branch of the State Bank of Ohio in 1856, in collaboration with James Mason, Henry Perkins, Joseph Perkins, Amasa Stone, Morrison Waite, Stillman Witt, and Samuel Young. By 1863, he owned a total of four national banks.

== Later life and legacy ==
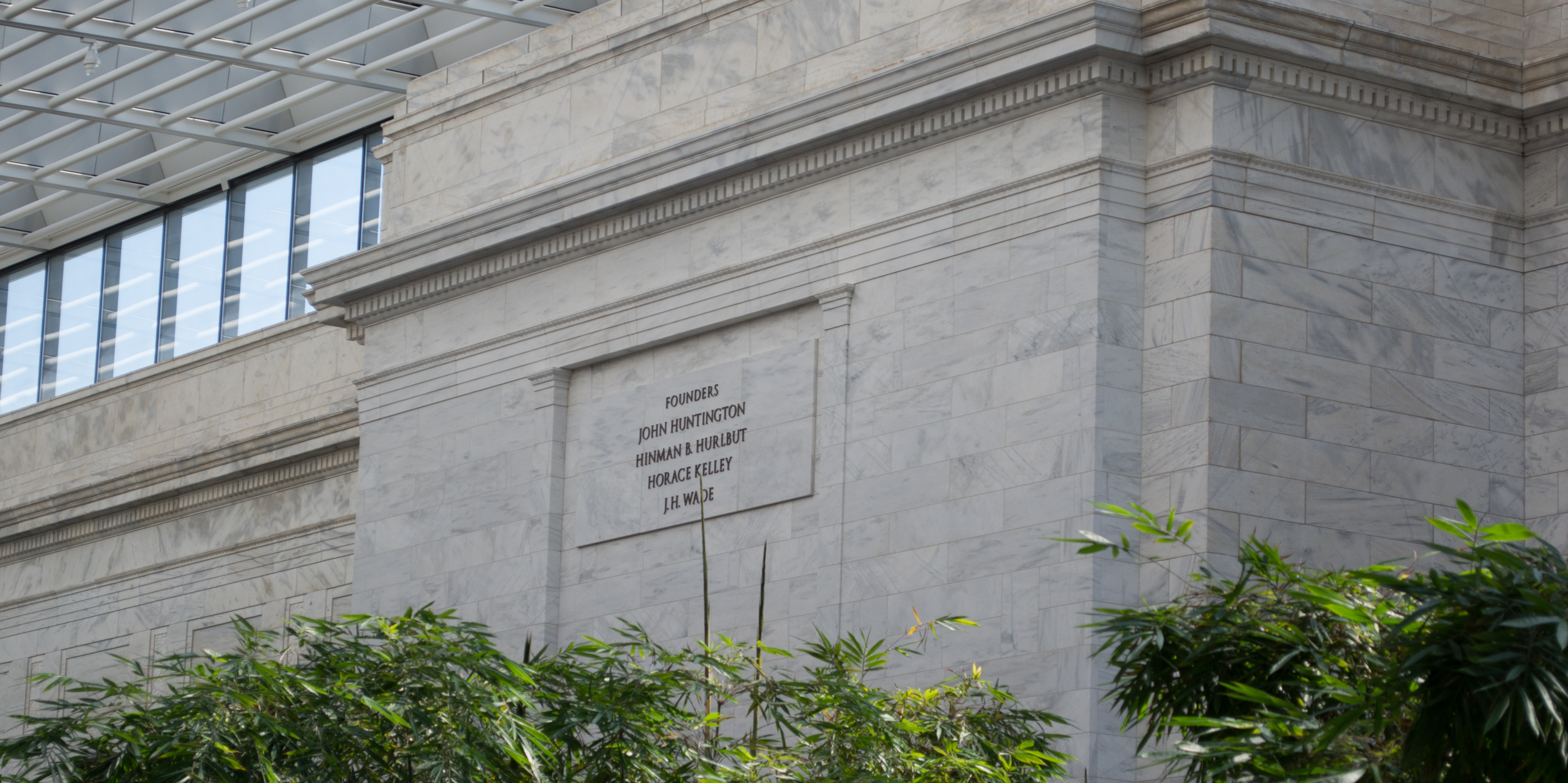
The Cleveland Museum of Art displays its founders names on a plaque in the Ames Family Atrium.

Retiring from his business ventures in 1865, Hurlbut took a three-year tour of Europe and returned to Ohio in 1868. He came back out of retirement in 1871, and became the president of the Cleveland, Columbus, Cincinnati and Indianapolis Railway the same year. An avid art collector, Hurlbut first became interested in art during his trips to Europe in 1865 and 1881. By the time he returned from his second trip, his collection consisted of 58 pieces of artwork of various media, including watercolor paintings, drawings, and sculptures. His wife was also interested in art and may have stimulated his collecting activities. She made purchases for their collection on annual trips abroad and continued making additions after her husband's death.

Hurlbut founded the Cleveland City Hospital, which later became the Lakeside Hospital and merged into the University Hospitals of Cleveland in 1925. He endowed a chair of natural sciences at the Western Reserve College.

Hurlbut died on March 22, 1884. He is buried at Lake View Cemetery in Cleveland. He left an excess of a quarter million dollars for the founding of an art museum through his will, which would help establish the Cleveland Museum of Art. He is considered a founder of the museum with John Huntington, Horace Kelley, and Jeptha Wade II. Parts of his art collection were also exhibited at the museum in 1917, 1921, and 1922.
