= David A. Dangler =

American politician (1826–1912)

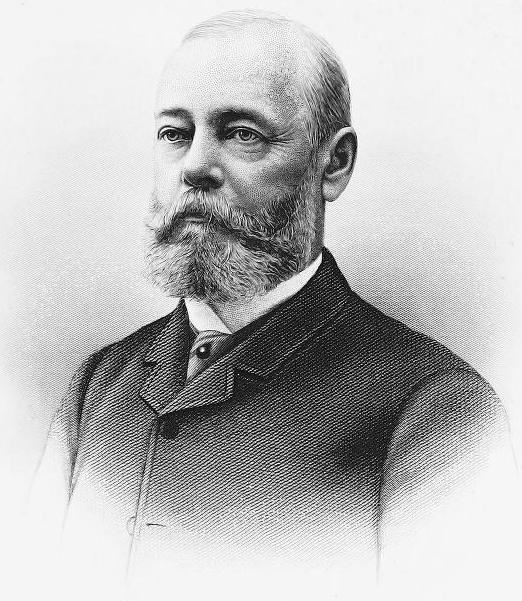
- Portrait of Dangler in 1887 publication

Member of the Ohio Senate from the 25th district
- In office 1868–1870
- Preceded by: Samuel Williamson
- Succeeded by: Worthy S. Streator

Member of the Ohio House of Representatives from the Cuyahoga County district
- In office 1866–1868 Serving with C. B. Lockwood and Morris E. Gallup
- Preceded by: Charles H. Babcock, Azariah Everett, Charles B. Lockwood
- Succeeded by: Nelson B. Sherwin, Robert B. Sherwin, Morris E. Gallup

Personal details
- Born: December 1826 Lebanon County, Pennsylvania, U.S.
- Died: March 25, 1912 (aged 85) Cleveland, Ohio, U.S.
- Party: Republican
- Spouse: Judith Clark
- Children: 3
- Occupation: Politician; businessman
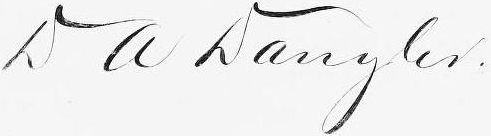
- Signature

David A. Dangler (December 1826 – March 25, 1912) was an American politician from Ohio. He served as a member of the Ohio House of Representatives, representing Cuyahoga County from 1866 to 1868 and the Ohio Senate from 1868 to 1870.

== Early life ==
David A. Dangler was born in December 1826 in Lebanon County, Pennsylvania, to Sarah and Samuel Dangler. At an early age, he moved to Stark County, Ohio, with his parents. He was educated in common schools. At the age of 15, Dangler worked as a clerk in the Canton general store of Isaac Harter. He worked there until 1845.

== Career ==
In 1845, Dangler moved to Massillon. In 1852, Dangler partnered with John Tennis of Massillon to start a hardware store in Cleveland under the name Tennis & Dangler. During the Civil War, Dangler worked with the department of the quartermaster. In 1868, Dangler withdrew from the business. He founded the Dangler Vapor Stove Company in Cleveland in 1880 to manufacture gasoline fueled cooking stoves. He served as president of the company for at least seven years. It later merged with the American Stove Company.

He founded the Crystal Carbon Company in May 1886 to manufacture carbon points for arc lights. It merged with the Boulton Carbon Company and Cleveland Carbon Company in July 1887 to become the Standard Carbon Company. Dangler was elected its first president.

He was also president of the Domestic Manufacturing Company, the Elwood Steel Company, and the First National Bank of Elwood.

== Politics ==
Dangler was a Republican.

In 1864, Dangler represented the 4th ward in the Cleveland City Council. He was chairman of the committee on schools.

He was elected to the Ohio House of Representatives, representing Cuyahoga County, in 1865. He served from 1866 to 1868. He worked in the legislature to move the city of Cleveland from a village marshall law enforcement system to a metropolitan system of policing.

In 1867, Dangler was elected to the Ohio Senate, representing the 25th district. He served from 1868 to 1870.

== Personal life ==
Dangler married Judith Clark, daughter of James H. Clark, of Massillon in 1845 or 1847. They had two sons and one daughter, Charles I., David Edward and Clara.

David A. Dangler died at his home on Prospect Avenue in Cleveland on March 25, 1912.
