= Lake View Cemetery =

Historic cemetery in Cleveland, Ohio, US

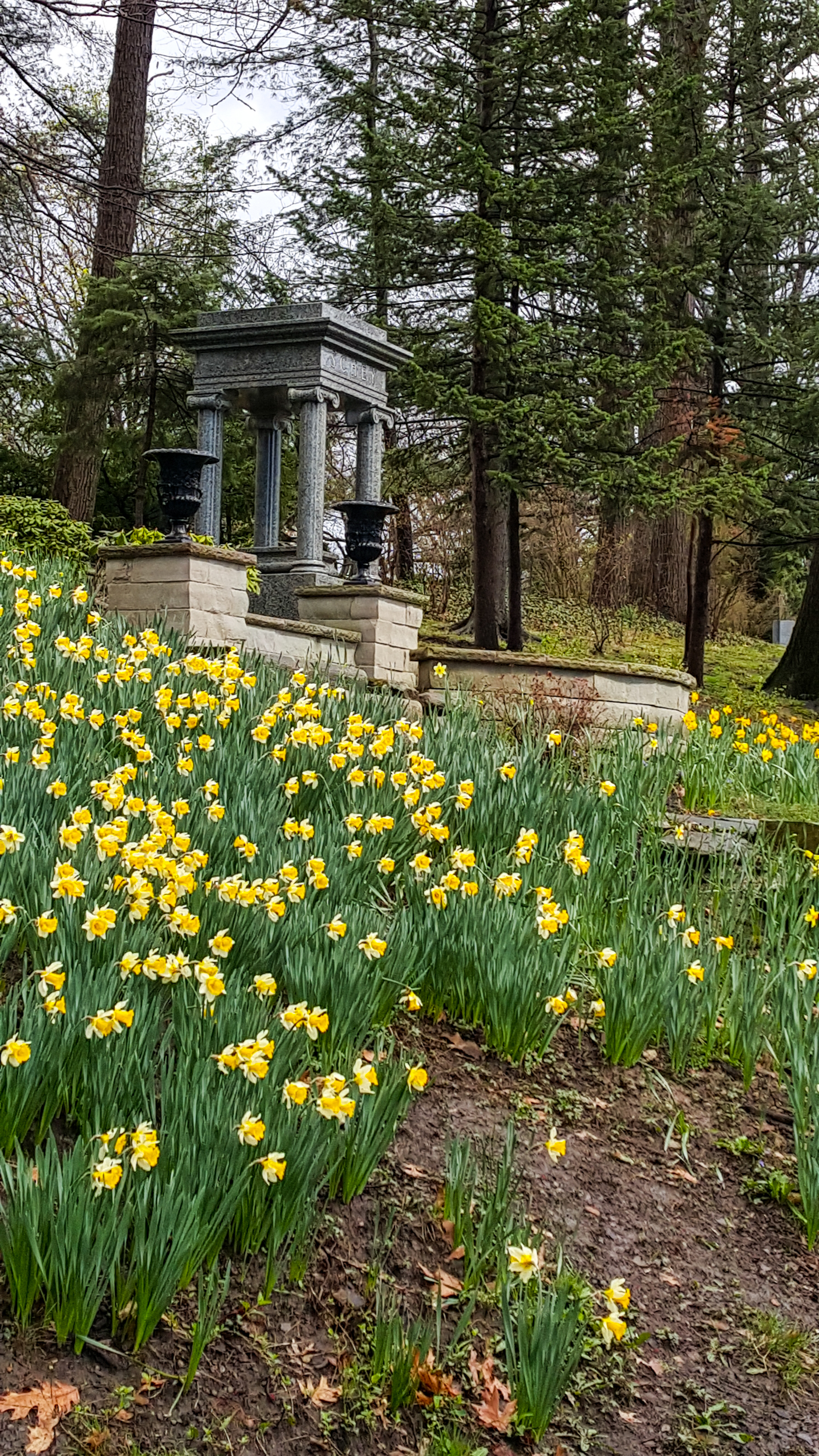
- Daffodil Hill and a nearby funerary monument at Lake View Cemetery
- Interactive map of Lake View Cemetery

Details
- Established: July 28, 1869
- Location: Cleveland, Ohio
- Country: United States
- Coordinates: 41.512492°N 81.5919379°W
- Type: Private
- Style: Garden
- Owned by: Lake View Cemetery Association
- Size: 285 acres (115 ha)
- No. of graves: 104,000 (2007)
- Website: LakeViewCemetery.com
- The Political Graveyard: Lake View Cemetery

Lake View Cemetery is a privately owned, nonprofit garden cemetery located in the cities of Cleveland, Cleveland Heights, and East Cleveland in the U.S. state of Ohio. Founded in 1869, the cemetery was favored by wealthy families during the Gilded Age, and today the cemetery is known for its numerous lavish funerary monuments and mausoleums. The extensive early monument building at Lake View helped give rise to the Little Italy neighborhood, but over-expansion nearly bankrupted the burial ground in 1888. Financial recovery only began in 1893, and took several years. Lake View grew and modernized significantly from 1896 to 1915 under the leadership of president Henry R. Hatch. The cemetery's cautious management allowed it to avoid retrenchment and financial problems during the Great Depression.

Two sites within the cemetery are listed on the National Register of Historic Places. The first is the James A. Garfield Memorial, erected in 1890 as the tomb of assassinated President James A. Garfield. The second is Wade Memorial Chapel, which began construction in 1898 and was completed in 1901. It honors the memory of Jeptha Wade, one of the cemetery's co-founders, and was donated by his grandson.

== Founding of the cemetery ==
=== Creation of the Lake View Cemetery Association ===
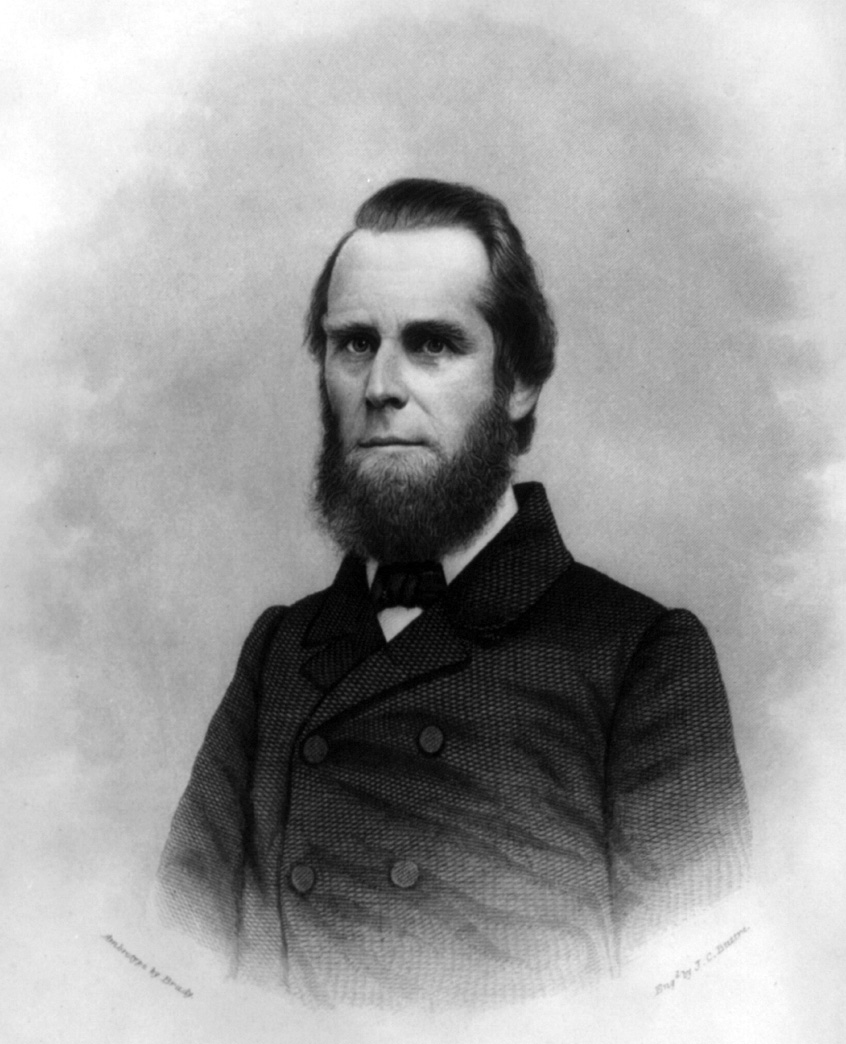
Jeptha Wade in 1859

In 1868, prominent Cleveland businessmen Jeptha Wade, Henry B. Payne, and Joseph Perkins began discussing the need for a new cemetery for the city of Cleveland. They believed that the city's then-preeminent burial ground, Woodland Cemetery, was too small for the growing city as well as overcrowded, ill-maintained, and not scenic enough. They issued an invitation on May 8, 1869, to about 40 of the city's other leading businessmen, asking them to meet at the end of the month to discuss the organization of a new cemetery. Thirty of them showed up to the meeting on May 24.

The group of 30 formed the nonprofit Lake View Cemetery Association on July 28, 1869. The trustees were William Bingham (owner of the W. Bingham Co. hardware company), Hinman B. Hurlbut (banking executive), Henry B. Payne (railroad investor), Joseph Perkins (banking and railroad executive), U.S. District Court Judge Charles Taylor Sherman, Amasa Stone (steelmaker and railroad investor), Worthy S. Streator (railroad executive and investor), Jeptha Wade (co-founder of Western Union), and Stillman Witt (railroad investor). Wade was named president, and Liberty E. Holden (owner of The Plain Dealer newspaper) the association clerk. The group resolved to build a garden cemetery in the style of Mount Auburn Cemetery near Boston, Massachusetts, or Spring Grove Cemetery in Cincinnati, Ohio, and Judge Sherman chose the name: Lake View Cemetery. Lake View was "non-sectarian" and open to all, which (in the 19th century) meant that its intended clientele were Protestant.

The group sold 7 percent annual interest bonds in the association, (Note: It was initially reported that this was stock.) hoping to raise $150,000 ($3.63 million in 2025 dollars). Within six weeks, they'd raised the money and set a new goal of $200,000 ($4.84 million in 2025 dollars), which was also reached. Selah Chamberlain (ironmaker, railroad investor, banker), Payne, Perkins, Stone, Wade, and Witt held $60,000 ($1.45 million in 2025 dollars) in bonds, while another 11 individuals held $55,000 ($1.33 million in 2025 dollars) in bonds.

=== Site selection, design, and construction ===
A committee was formed to choose a site for the new cemetery. Its members consisted of Holden, Payne, Perkins, Sherman, and J.C. Buell (a local banking executive). The committee wanted a location on the lake shore, but found nothing suitable. While traveling on Euclid Avenue, Holden came upon the cemetery site by chance. The area was known as "Smith Run". Beginning on the Erie Plain in the northwest, the site rose into the foothills of the Portage Escarpment. Dugway Brook (which bisected the site) and several small streams ran south-to-north through the area, carving out a number of ravines The Dugway Brook ravine was particularly deep, and Euclid bluestone (a bluish-colored sandstone) had once been quarried there.

By late September 1869, the Lake View Association had purchased 175 acres (71 ha) of land on this ridge adjacent to Euclid Avenue. (Within a year, the cemetery encompassed 211 acres (85 ha).) (Note: The first $200,000 in Lake View Cemetery bonds were not issued until 1871, so it appears that the initial purchases of land, at roughly $1,000 an acre, were made based on pledges to buy cemetery bonds.) This gave the cemetery about 0.75 miles (1.21 km) of frontage on the avenue. The combined cost of the two purchases was $148,821.84 ($3.79 million in 2025 dollars). Located in what was then East Cleveland Township, the site was somewhat isolated. With the city pushing eastward at a swift pace, city and county government officials were already planning additional roads in the area, several of which would reach the new cemetery. (Note: Lake View Cemetery initially straddled the border between Cleveland Heights and East Cleveland. In November 1872, the city of Cleveland annexed about 8 square miles (21 km^{2}) of land, much of it on the city's eastern border. This brought a portion of Lake View Cemetery within Cleveland's borders.)

Landscape architect Adolph Strauch, who designed Cincinnati's celebrated Spring Grove Cemetery, was hired in October 1869 to design Lake View. Joseph Earnshaw of Cincinnati was the civil engineer, and O.D. Ford was hired as the first superintendent. During the winter of 1869–1870, work crews began grading and laying down roads and paths, terracing part of the site for in-ground plots and mausoleums, and removing underbrush and unwanted trees. By February 1870, two sections were being laid out with a total of about 500 plots.

The 300 plots in the first section went on sale on June 23, 1870, according to The Plain Dealer newspaper. The cost of a standard size in-ground grave was set at $4.00 ($102 in 2025 dollars). Larger sites for families, monuments, or mausoleums went for 20 cents ($5 in 2025 dollars) a square foot. The cemetery's distance from Cleveland's population center and the price of its plots meant that only those with a middle class income or better could afford to be buried at Lake View.

== Early years: 1869 to 1880 ==
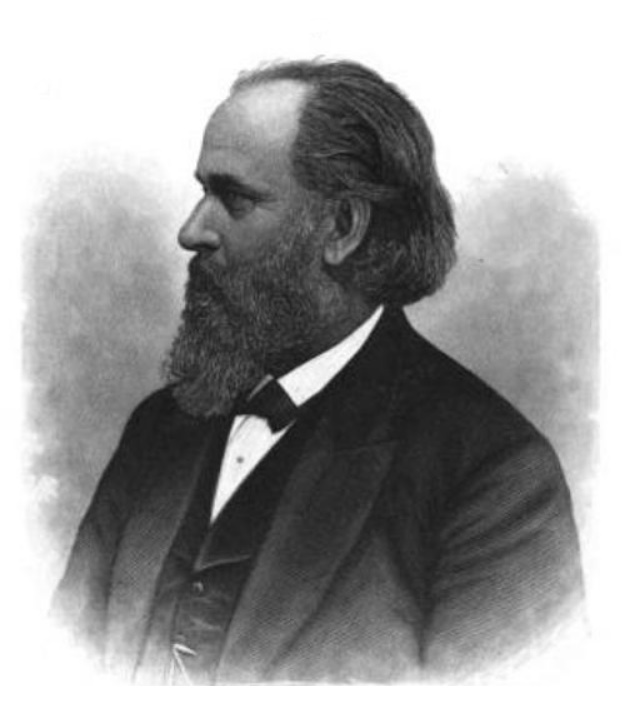
Adolph Strauch, who designed the master plan and laid out the initial sections of Lake View Cemetery

It's not clear when the first interments at Lake View Cemetery were made, but several plots were in use by October 21, 1870.

Improvements to and expansion of the cemetery continued over the next few years. The first ravine was bridged in November 1870, and in December the association purchased an unspecified number of acres that doubled the length of its frontage on Euclid Avenue. The cemetery sold $400,000 ($10.8 million in 2025 dollars) in bonds in 1871 to pay for more improvements. To secure the bonds, the cemetery pledged all but sold lots, roads, and water features. By August 1871, six sections of the cemetery were laid out and the receiving vault for use by plot-holders, designed by local architect Joseph Ireland, was almost finished. A superintendent's lodge at the front gate on Euclid Avenue was finished at the end of the year. By this time, several large, artistic funerary monuments had been erected at Lake View. The association purchased another 41 acres (17 ha) of land in October 1872 and 2.17 acres (0.88 ha) in January 1873. By June 1873, the cemetery had a total of 266 acres (108 ha). It had spent $65,643 ($1.76 million in 2025 dollars) on landscaping, with eight sections landscaped, plotted, and open for burials. The cemetery even dammed Dugway Brook in places to create ponds.

Plots at Lake View Cemetery in its first three years sold for half the average price of plots in established cemeteries. Plot sales generated little income initially. At the close of the 1872–1873 fiscal year, the cemetery was technically bankrupt, with more debt (about $198,000 [$5.32 million in 2025 dollars]) than assets. Plot sales were brisk, however, and the cemetery was proving extremely popular with local residents. As much as 40 percent of all burials at Lake View Cemetery between 1870 and 1873 were removals from Woodland Cemetery. Another 21.8 acres (8.8 ha) of land were purchased in August 1873, and the cemetery's acreage totalled 304 acres (123 ha) in 1876.

Euclid Avenue was paved up to Lake View Cemeteryn in 1874. Lake View Cemetery purchased another 100 acres (40 ha) of land in 1875, issuing $150,000 ($4.4 million in 2025 dollars) in 6 percent annual interest bonds to pay for it.

By 1877, The Plain Dealer estimated, more than $100,000 ($3.02 million in 2025 dollars) in funerary monuments dotted the landscape at Lake View Cemetery. These included the highly visible obelisks and shafts over the Doan, Kelley, McDermott, Potter, and Tisdale plots; the Goodrich and Jaynes memorials; the Keynes column (topped with a funerary urn); the Jeptha Wade shaft, which was topped by an angel; and the Hurlbut pillar topped with a weeping figure. There were also a number of monuments with well-designed, expertly carved bas-relief or freestanding sculptures. These included the angel atop the Truman P. Handy memorial, the weeping woman atop the Bucher and Hanna monuments, the group of angels supporting a cross atop the Cross grave, figures carved on the upright slabs over the Johnson and Garretson plots, a sculptural group named "Hope" atop the Perkins monument, and another sculptural group atop the Chamberlain monument. Although a number of large mausoleums had been built in the cemetery, the newspaper noted that the most elaborate of these was the tomb being erected by H.J. Wilcox. Wilcox had visited Italy, where he employed artisans to design a vault that mimicked the look of an Italian Renaissance chapel.

With lots selling quickly, cemetery officials used the revenue to redeem debt. By 1878, only $10,000 of the 1871 bond issue remained unredeemed, and just $30,000 of the 1875 bond issue. The trustees decided to retire both debts by issuing $40,000 ($1.33 million in 2025 dollars) in new bonds at 7 percent annual interest. Although the new bonds were sold, the old debt was inexplicably not retired.

== Expansion: 1881 to 1890 ==
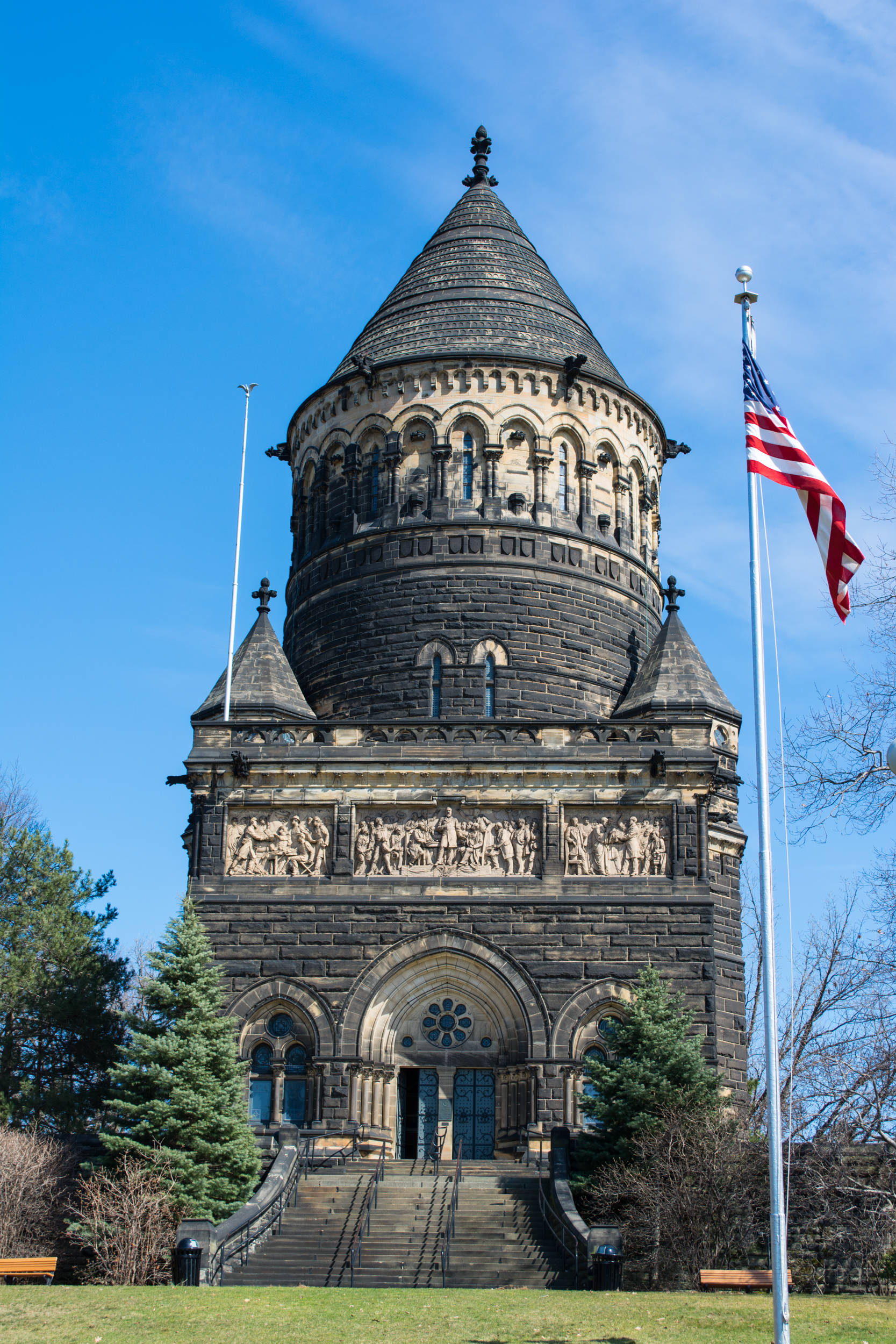
The James A. Garfield Memorial

=== Building the Garfield Memorial ===
President James A. Garfield, a resident of nearby Mentor, Ohio, was shot in Washington, D.C., on July 2, 1881. He died on September 19, 1881. Garfield himself had expressed the wish to be buried at Lake View Cemetery, and the cemetery offered a burial site free of charge to his widow, Lucretia Garfield. (Note: The land for the memorial was worth $55,000 ($1,800,000 in 2025 dollars).)

Mrs. Garfield agreed to bury her husband at Lake View. Garfield was temporarily interred in the cemetery's public vault on September 26, 1881, then transferred on October 22 to an empty mausoleum owned and designed by noted local architect Levi Scofield. Even before Garfield's funeral, plans were laid by his friends and admirers for a grand tomb to be erected at the highest point in the cemetery. (Note: The horse-drawn hearse which carried Garfield from Cleveland's Public Square to the cemetery was donated to Lake View.)

The popularity of the garden-like cemetery and the public's desire to see Garfield's resting place were such that large crowds began thronging Lake View every Sunday. Roughly 50,000 people a year were visiting the crypt. The cemetery received no revenues from the memorial committee despite the wear and tear on its property. Cemetery officials began requiring tickets in the summer of 1882 to enter the grounds in order to control the crowds and maintain a suitable atmosphere for mourning. Relic hunters were so willing to vandalize the Scofield tomb (they even ripped up the grass around it) that a wire fence had to be erected to keep them away. In 1891, the cemetery barred all non-lotholding visitors from the cemetery on Sundays unless they had a pass. With only about 230 Sunday passes available, hundreds of people were turned away.

The Garfield Memorial Committee selected the highest point in the cemetery in June 1883 for the president's final resting place. Lake View Cemetery built a road around the memorial in early 1885, and began work on cutting a road from the Euclid Gate to the memorial site in the fall of that year. The cemetery also began work on making improvements to the landscape, water, and drainage around the site. The Garfield Memorial was dedicated on May 30, 1890. Lucretia Garfield, the president's widow, died on March 13, 1918, and was interred in the Garfield Memorial on March 21.

=== Rise of Little Italy ===
Little Italy largely owes its inception to funerary monument maker Joseph Carabelli. In 1870, the 20-year-old northern Italian journeyman stonecarver emigrated to the United States. He spent 10 years in New York City, where he dressed stone and carved the statue Industry for the Federal Building and Post Office in Brooklyn. Carabelli relocated to Cleveland in 1880, establishing the Lake View Granite and Monumental Works on Mayfield Road adjacent to the cemetery. Carabelli began encouraging other Italian sculptors, stonecutters, and artisans to settle in Cleveland near his works, and by 1885 a substantial enclave of Italians, mostly immigrants, had grown up there.

By 1892, the neighborhood adjacent to the cemetery's southwestern corner had become known as Little Italy. It was largely inhabited by Italian immigrants who worked as groundskeepers at Lake View or who worked in the funeral monument companies making headstones or memorials for placement in the cemetery. 1892 also saw the city of Cleveland annex Little Italy. The annexation included all of Lake View Cemetery west of a line running from the end of Brightwood Avenue south to Mayfield Road.

=== Streetcar access ===
Lake View, Collamer & Euclid Railway, a streetcar line, proposed a line to reach Lake View's main gate in July 1874. However, as built in 1876, the line followed Superior Avenue to Euclid Avenue before proceeding east—reaching Euclid east of Lake View Cemetery.

The first streetcar to reach Lake View Cemetery was the East Cleveland Railway Euclid Avenue Line in 1886. The company extended its tracks from its existing terminus at E. 107th Street up Euclid Avenue to Rosedale Avenue in East Cleveland (just short of the major thoroughfare of Noble Road). The East Cleveland Railway opened a second set of tracks, an extension of its Cedar Avenue Line, in 1889. This line began at the company's car barn at the intersection of Euclid Avenue and Coltman Road. The line traveled south on Coltman to reach Mayfield Road, then south down Murray Hill Road to Cedar Avenue. A year after the Cedar Avenue Line extension opened, the Cleveland Electric Railway Company opened its Mayfield Road Line. This line went past Lake Views Mayfield Road gate. The line began at the East Cleveland Railway's car barn, went south down Coltman to Mayfield, and then east on Mayfield to Lee Road. (Note: On the return trip, the car went up E. 123rd Street to reach Euclid Avenue rather than Coltman Road.) This line closed in 1907.

In 1902, Lake View Cemetery gave permission for the Cleveland Electric Railway to build a spur into the cemetery so that the streetcar firm's funeral car could be used to transport caskets and funeral parties to the cemetery.

== Financial difficulties ==
=== Emergence of the financial crisis ===
As of 1888, Lake View Cemetery had 300 acres (120 ha) of land. About 70 acres (28 ha) had been laid out, but only half had been sold. The cemetery association had spent $800,000 ($28.7 million in 2025 dollars) buying land and improving it. By the end of 1888, about 14 percent of Lake View's 300 acres (120 ha) had been sold, bringing in $406,000 ($16.5 million in 2025 dollars). The price of a single-burial lot had more than doubled since the cemetery opened, to ($14 to $18 in 2025 dollars) a square foot.

By late 1888, Lake View Cemetery was nearing bankruptcy. Mismanagement was part of the problem, and The Plain Dealer newspaper said the cemetery's financial records were in "deplorable" shape. Lake View had outstanding debt of $432,980 ($15.5 million in 2025 dollars), (Note: Bonds accounted for $390,000 of this debt.) and interest on the debt consumed $23,031 a year ($800,000 in 2025 dollars). Maintenance of the few open sections cost another $9,676 ($300,000 in 2025 dollars) a year, yet income was only $23,875 ($900,000 in 2025 dollars) a year on average. The cemetery superintendent had spent $150,000 to $200,000 ($5.38 million to $7.17 million in 2025 dollars) on improvements, a figure officials privately admitted was too much. (Note: The Plain Dealer later claimed that the cemetery had spent only $65,000 ($2.33 million in 2025 dollars) improving its grounds, although the newspaper did not say what period this figure covered.) Lot sales fell below expectations, and the cemetery had never established a reserve fund to see the organization through difficult economic times. Cemetery trustees were aware of the worsening deficit many years earlier, and believed the cemetery should stop paying interest on its bonds to bring its finances back in order. This step was not taken because the trustees believed many bondholders relied on interest for income. The cemetery began quietly borrowing money from the Citizens Savings and Loan Association, a local bank, in order to pay interest on its bonds.

The association paid out only 4 percent of the 7 percent annual interest due on its bonds at the end of 1888, creating a severe financial hardship for bondholders who relied on the interest for their living expenses. Bonds which formerly sold for $108 to $110 (the par value was $100) now began selling at $50 to $75. Angry bondholders protested the move, but were assured that the cemetery's financial problems were temporary. Bondholders representing about $50,000 out the bonds formed a committee in late March 1889 to seek more information about the cemetery's financial status.

Quietly, the cemetery began accepting bonds as payment for lots. Usually, purchasers held few bonds, with those holding large amounts of bonds refusing to sell. Although the exchange of bonds for lots would impact revenues, cemetery officials believed that only $7,000 to $8,000 in bonds would be redeemed.

=== February 1889 proposed rescue plan ===
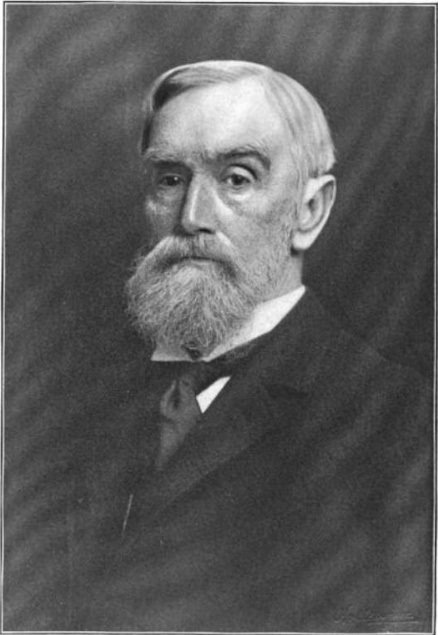
Daniel P. Eells, the cemetery trustee who proposed the November 1889 financial rescue plan

The initial plan to save Lake View Cemetery, proposed by association officials, (Note: The plan was proposed at a meeting of Lake View Cemetery Association officials and representatives of bondholders. Cemetery leaders present were P.H. Babcock, William Bingham, Selah Chamberlain, T.D. Crocker, and Edward Williams. Bondholder representatives present were S.F. Adams, B.W. Haskins, and Harry F. Hayes.) paid bondholders 3 percent of interest due in cash and the remainder in scrip. The cemetery would also create a sinking fund to redeem scrip. To generate revenue, the cost of lots would be halved to just 25 cents ($9 in 2025 dollars) a square foot; the surge in lot-buying, it was believed would raise $2 million ($71.7 million in 2025 dollars). In addition, spending on cemetery improvements would be cut back sharply. (Note: In November 1889, cemetery trustee Daniel P. Eells claimed improvements had ceased during the year.) The reaction of the bondholders was not reported, but area businesspeople began suggesting that the city of Cleveland purchase the cemetery. (Note: Many believed the city would have purchased Lake View already had its own financial condition not been so poor. The proposed purchase plan would have the city buy up Lake View's highly discounted bonds, then cancel them. The city would then issue 4 percent annual interest bonds to the former bondholders in compensation.)

The plan was amended at the end of April 1889 so that all interest coming due that year was paid in scrip. Interest due after 1889 would be paid 3 percent in cash, 4 percent in scrip. The cemetery agreed to pay 6 percent annual interest on scrip, to devote all income first to maintaining the cemetery and second to paying cash interest, and to create a second sinking fund dedicated to redeeming bonds at maturity. Excess income (after expenditures for maintenance and cash interest) would go toward the sinking funds, redemption of scrip, a fund to pay the next year's cash interest, and to pay other debts. Significant bondholder opposition to the plan began to emerge.

In June 1889, the Lake View Cemetery Association paid only 3 percent of the 7 percent annual interest due in cash, the remainder in scrip. The cemetery was forced to redeem $11,000 ($400,000 in 2025 dollars) in bonds at par that month alone as payment for lots. The redemption of bonds significantly impacted the cemetery's cash flow, and by the end of 1889 it could not pay any interest in cash. Income was so negatively impacted by the exchange of bonds for lots that cemetery trustees admitted on June 1, 1889, that no cash interest would be paid at the end of the year; all interest would be paid in scrip. The trustees also warned that scrip might not be issued unless bondholders agreed to the cemetery's financial rescue plan. Angry bondholders began to threaten lawsuits to personally hold the trustees responsible for the payment of interest.

The bonds-for-lots exchange program proved financially disastrous. Lake View sold lots worth $12,000 in September 1889 but received only $1,000 in cash as the remainder was paid in bonds. In the same month, maintenance expenses amounted to $5,000. At the beginning of October 1889, the association stopped accepting the full amount of bonds for the purchase of lots, and said it would accept bonds for only one-third of the lot sale price. The cemetery also agreed to accept scrip for up to a third of a lot's cost as well.

=== November 1889 proposed rescue plan ===
Local banker and cemetery trustee Daniel P. Eells proposed in November 1889 to form a syndicate to raise $200,000 ($7.17 million in 2025 dollars) and redeem two-thirds of all outstanding bonds at the current market price. A trustee would hold the redeemed bonds until January 1, 1893, paying interest on them from net cash income. (Note: Net cash income was total revenues less operating expenses.) The trustee (Note: Backers of the plan proposed that Eells himself be the trustee.) would distribute the bonds on a pro rata basis on January 2, 1893. Subscribers to the redemption fund were essentially betting that the price of the bonds in 1893 would have risen more than enough to not only cover their investment but also offset the loss of income from the reduced interest payments. (Note: Bondholders who did not wish to sell their bonds were encouraged to turn their bonds over to the trustee. They would not receive the reduced interest payments but would receive their bonds back in 1893.) Eells said the cemetery faced bankruptcy if the syndicate scheme was not adopted.

Gaining acceptance from the bondholders was complicated. C.F. Houghton, a banker and bond dealer based on the East Coast, held all $10,000 of the outstanding 1871 bonds and $7,000 of the 1875 bonds. Samuel E. Williamson, a local judge, held $13,000 of the 1875 issue. Another 331 individuals held the remaining $10,000 of the 1875 and all $40,000 of the 1878 issue. Houghton claimed to have been given misleading information on the amount of outstanding debt by Lake View officials, and he threatened to sue the cemetery to force it into receivership (a process which would take about six years to accomplish). Support for the cemetery's plan among the miscellaneous bondholders was about evenly split. Those in opposition argued it was unethical for the cemetery to create a financial crisis which caused bond interest to cease and bond prices to collapse, and then turn around and offer to buy those bonds back at the new low price.

A recession hit the U.S. economy in 1890 followed by a brief depression in 1891, further depressing lot sales.

By 1892, the grounds at Lake View Cemetery were seriously neglected. Sections ready for sale were unmown, weeds and other plants grew wild, and erosion and drought had left some areas bare of vegetation. Only a small percentage of the cemetery's roads were paved, and the remainder, all dirt roads, were heavily eroded and rutted. Lake View's finances were so poor that many residents believed it was close to bankruptcy. The association needed revenue so badly that its trustees considered lowering the price of lots so that the poor could afford to be buried there. (Note: The poor were unable to afford funerary monuments. Many could not afford simple, flat in-ground markers. Opening Lake View to large numbers of the poor would leave a good portion of the cemetery without the beautiful funerary sculpture its founders believed a first-class garden cemetery should have.) The cemetery generated so little revenue that it had incurred about $365,700 ($13.1 million in 2025 dollars) in debt above and beyond interest and principal owed on bonds.

=== 1892 approved rescue plan ===
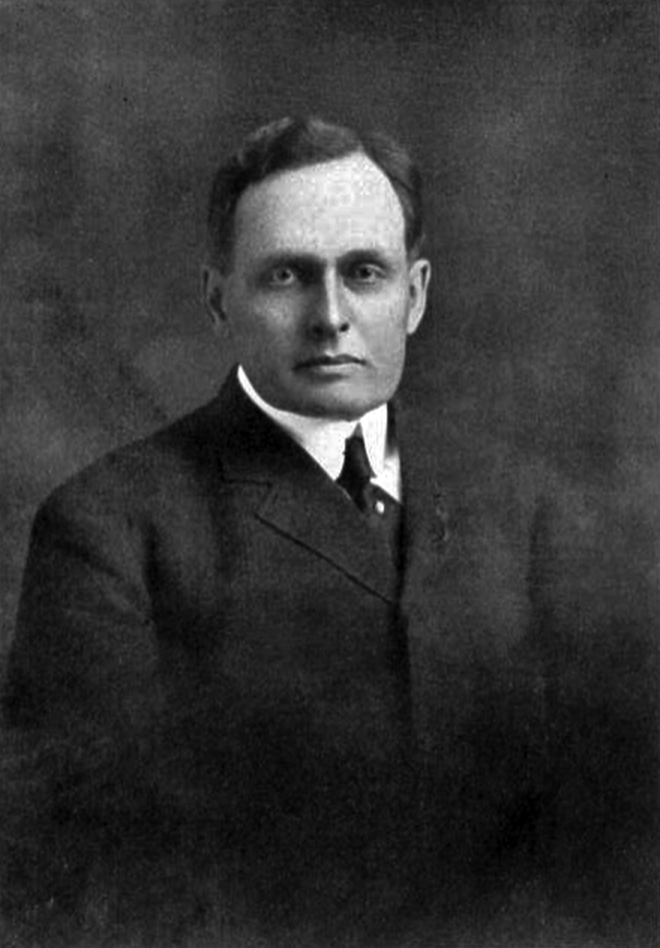
Harry Garfield, who helped Lake View Cemetery through its financial crisis of the 1890s

With revenues extraordinarily low and the association not having paid any interest in cash since 1889, cemetery trustees formed a committee consisting of Daniel P. Eels, Henry R. Hatch, and Edwin R. Perkins to see what level of cash interest could be sustained. The committee proposed a new plan in February 1892: All 1871 and 1878 bondholders could turn in their bonds and receive a new "refunding bond" paying lower annual interest. (Note: Sources differ as to whether this new low interest was 6 percent or 4 percent.) (Note: The 1875 bonds, paying 6 percent annual interest, would qualify for redemption only after all 7 percent bondholders had been refunded.) To cover all outstanding debt, about $400,000 ($14.3 million in 2025 dollars) in "refunding bonds", back-dated to December 1, 1891, would be issued. They would have a $1,000 par value, and be payable in 50 years.

Interest for the last six months of 1892 would be paid in cash at a 7 percent annual rate. The new bonds would carry coupons for all other past-due interest, to be paid at a 6 percent annual rate. Additionally, redeemed bondholders would receive an income debenture equal to 20 percent of the bond's face value. Only $100,000 ($3.58 million in 2025 dollars) in income debentures would be issued, carrying a 7 percent (or less) annual interest rate. To ensure payment of the interest on the debentures, the cemetery agreed to establish a sinking fund whose proceeds would pay the interest. (Note: Lake View Cemetery officials said they intended to put $5,000 a year into the sinking fund in the plan's first five years; $6,000 a year for the second five years; $6,500 a year for following 10 years; $7,500 a year for next 10-year period; $10,000 a year for third ten-year period; and $15,000 a year for the final 10-year period. This would take the cemetery to 1942, when all refunded bonds matured and the debentures expired.)

Lake View Cemetery agreed that revenues would go toward maintenance and cemetery expenses first. Excess revenues would be applied first to the income debentures, second to interest on the 1878 and refunding bonds, third to sinking fund payments, and lastly to any reasonable improvements to be made to the cemetery. The cemetery staff believed that only about $4,000 ($100,000 in 2025 dollars) a year was needed to maintain the cemetery. Interest on the 1875 bond issue (of which only $35,000 was outstanding) amounted to $2,100 a year ($100,000 in 2025 dollars), while interest on the refunding bonds would amount to $16,000 a year ($600,000 in 2025 dollars).

About half the outstanding bondholders approved of Lake View's plan, but it needed 90 percent to do so before the financial recovery plan could be implemented. The cemetery association tried and failed to get bondholder approval for its plan, and then turned for assistance to Harry A. Garfield, son of President James A. Garfield and a local attorney who represented several cemetery bondholders. (Note: Garfield had first examined Lake View Cemetery's books on behalf of bondholders in 1889, and found numerous errors.) Garfield felt the association's plan was needed to ensure the cemetery's financial stability, and began sending personalized and form letters to all the bondholders in December 1891. The cemetery's plan was tweaked to provide for even smaller par values for the refunding bonds. In total, $500,000 ($17.9 million in 2025 dollars) in refunding bonds were proposed, 350 at $1,000 par value, 50 at $500 par value, and 1,250 at $100 par value. Five months after Garfield began his lobbying effort, 75 percent of bondholders approved the plan. The remaining approvals were received in June 1892, and the LVCA board of directors authorized issuance of the refunding bonds. Legal work took longer than usual, however, and it was not until December that the bonds were finally issued.

The cemetery's financial condition improved significantly over the next few years. Although some board members felt the cemetery should still be sold to the city of Cleveland, the board rejected this proposal overwhelmingly in June 1895. The cemetery board approved the erection of a crematorium in 1900, but no action was taken on the plan.

== Renewed improvement ==
In 1896, Lake View Cemetery's entrance was unprepossessing. Located next to Mayfield Road about 200 feet (61 m) southwest of the current entrance, it consisted of a small wooden gate, a two-room office in a wooden shack just inside the gate, and a small wood-frame home for the superintendent adjacent to the office.

Henry R. Hatch was elected Lake View's president in June 1896. Lake View was in dilapidated condition, with nearly all monuments and headstones sinking or out of plumb. The cemetery's financial problems had hindered its development for years now, and Hatch implemented new, modern financial and recordkeeping systems to further improve accounting and cash flow. A new system of gravedigging orders was also implemented, (Note: The order form was in duplicate. After being filled out by office staff, one copy went to the foreman of gravediggers. The foreman made a sketch of the plot on the form, showing the grave location as measured from the lot corners. This copy was then filed in the cemetery engineer's office. The other copy was retained by the cemetery's main office, and went into the permanent files once the funeral was over and the headstone set.) and cemetery engineering was improved. Lake View had long laid out lots according to the contour of the ground. Steep slopes (Note: Lake View engineers generally avoided any slope with a grade greater than 5 degrees.) were avoided, and roads with storm drains laid out before a section was plotted. The new engineering standards required that all sections have a 3-foot (0.91 m) wide infrastructure border around them. (Note: Infrastructure included fresh water lines, sewer drains, and telephone lines. Water lines also were laid below the interior walkways in the section.) The outermost tier of graves was intended for monuments, and lots were 12 feet (3.7 m) deep. All other tiers had lots just 9 feet (2.7 m) in length, with a 3-foot (0.91 m) walkway between tiers. Any section deeper than 150 feet (46 m) in depth also needs to have an 8-foot (2.4 m) wide service road bisecting it. All ground was roughly graded before the construction of infrastructure and roads; wet ground was drained after rough grading. Section and lot corners were marked with cornerstones, and all permanent fixtures were recorded on the cemetery engineer's maps.

With the Long Depression ending in the United States, the board believed lot sales would rise significantly. With the board's backing, Hatch began making new improvements to the cemetery and converting undeveloped land into sections 4, 10, and 26 at a cost of $10,000 ($400,000 in 2025 dollars). Realizing that lot sizes were too large and expensive for middle-class purchasers, Hatch ordered that lots in what is now Section 26 be small and affordable like those at Woodland Cemetery. Unsold large lots in what is now Section 1 were subdivided into smaller lots as well. Terra cotta markers were placed to mark section boundaries, and new maps of the cemetery produced for the first time in several years. Cemetery-wide improvements included the laying of 600 feet (180 m) of fresh water pipe for irrigation purposes, 2,400 feet (730 m) of drainage pipe to reclaim soggy land for burial purposes, 800 feet (240 m) of new fencing around the exterior of the cemetery, 1,017 feet (310 m) of new concrete sidewalks, and extensive graveling of dirt roads. Cemetery staff were given uniforms to wear for the first time, and a marquee purchased to provide cover for funeral attendees during inclement weather. In sections with large lots intended for funerary monuments, Hatch ordered that lot corners by marked with a 6 by 6 inches (150 by 150 mm) piece of polished dark Quincy granite with lot numbers carved into each corner. Where section lots contained just two to six graves, corners were marked with a 3 by 3 inches (76 by 76 mm) piece of Georgia marble or slate.

Hatch also hired landscape architect Ernest W. Bowditch to finish laying out the cemetery's 300 acres (120 ha). Bowditch retained the garden cemetery design begun in 1869, and began planting large numbers of ornamental trees, including bald cypress, copper beech, ginkgo, oriental plane, pin oak, and purple beech. Importantly, he also planned a new entrance for Lake View Cemetery on Euclid Avenue, with a new circle just inside the cemetery gate. The new office building at the entrance was designed by noted local architect Charles F. Schweinfurth, and the cost of its construction donated by Hatch. Neoclassical in style, it was faced with Ohio sandstone. The $6,000 ($200,000 in 2025 dollars) rectangular structure was 25 by 51 feet (7.6 by 15.5 m) in size. The floors and wainscoting were hardwood. Ground for the new office building was broken on October 21, 1897, and it was completed in April 1898.

=== Construction of Wade Memorial Chapel ===
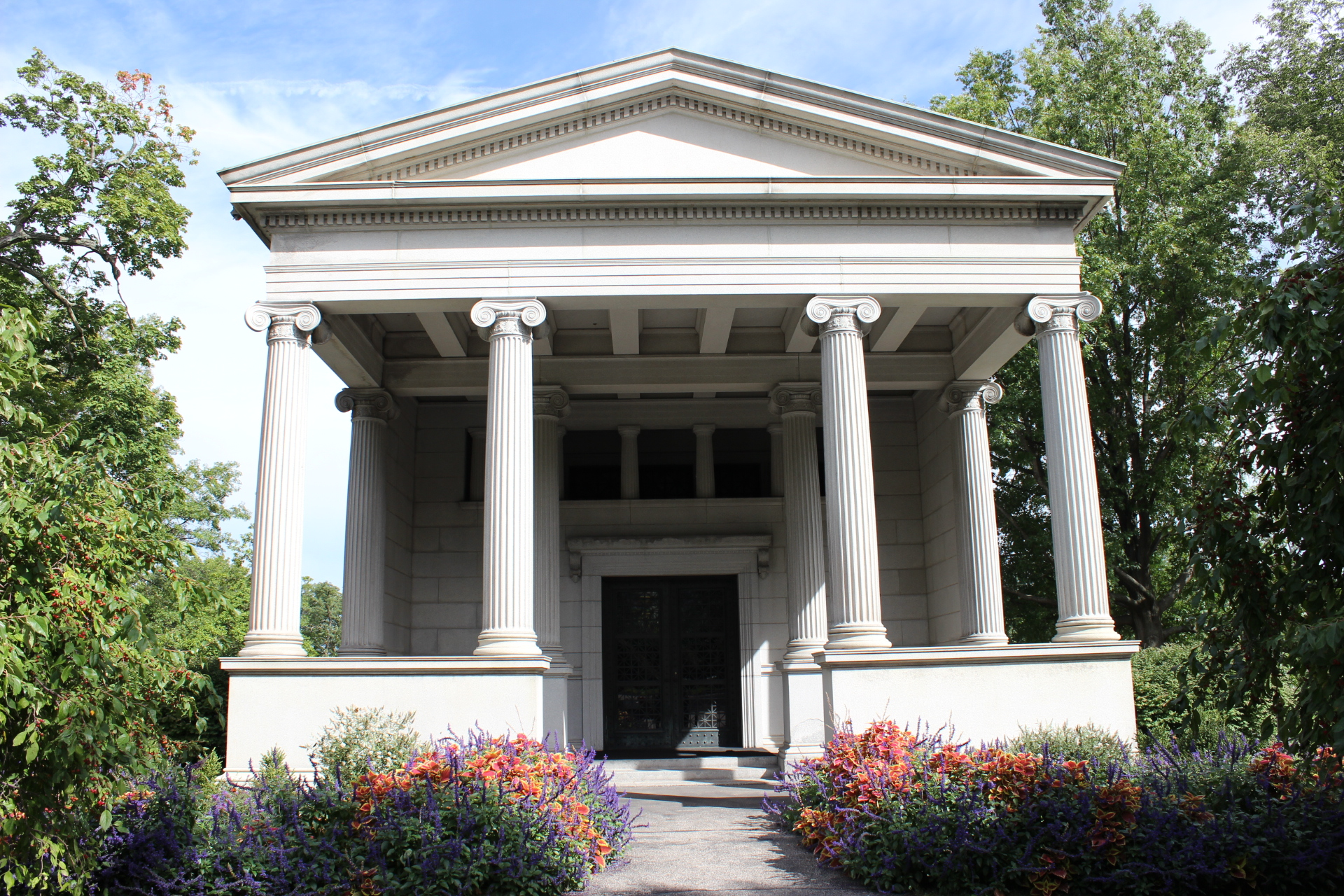
Wade Memorial Chapel in 2018

In 1896, Jeptha H. Wade II decided to fund the construction of a new receiving vault and chapel, dedicated to the memory of his grandfather, at Lake View Cemetery. Wade asked the newly founded Cleveland architectural firm of Hubbell & Benes to create a preliminary design. He was so happy with their work that he chose this concept as the design for the chapel and commissioned Hubbell & Benes to finalize the blueprints. The association did not formally accept the new chapel until the plans were done.

The site chosen for the chapel was between two existing lakes, diagonally across a road from the existing public vault. The exterior walls were clad in near-white Barre granite from Barre, Vermont. The interior decor was designed and manufactured by Tiffany & Co. The commission was considered so important that Louis Comfort Tiffany personally contacted Hubbell & Benes to win the job. The chapel featured a massive stained glass window at the rear and mosaics on each side wall. Portraying the resurrection of Jesus, the stained glass window, titled Resurrection was designed by Tiffany artisan Agnes Northrop; it is also known as the Flight of Souls as it depicts the saints standing next to Jesus. Tiffany artist Frederick Wilson designed the wall mosaics, which feature verses from the Christian Bible (I Corinthians, the Book of John, and the Book of Job). The Favrile glass and gold tile mosaics depicted the passage of life to death. The left side mosaic became known as "The River of Life", while the other had the title "The River of Death". The chapel featured a casket pedestal in place of an altar. This pedestal could be lowered mechanically through the floor into crypt, where the receiving vault was located. The "public" portion of the crypt could hold as many as 96 coffins. Two private receiving vaults also existed on the crypt level, closed off by marble doors.

Ground for the new chapel was broken on February 19, 1898. The hillside was excavated 25 feet (7.6 m) down to bedrock, and the foundations and crypt level finished in late December 1898. Completing the interior took much longer than expected, and the chapel was not finished until 1901. The cost was variously reported to be $350,000 ($13.5 million in 2025 dollars), $150,000 ($5.81 million in 2025 dollars), $140,000 ($5.42 million in 2025 dollars), and "more than $100,000" ($3.87 million in 2025 dollars).

=== Erecting the Rockefeller Monument ===
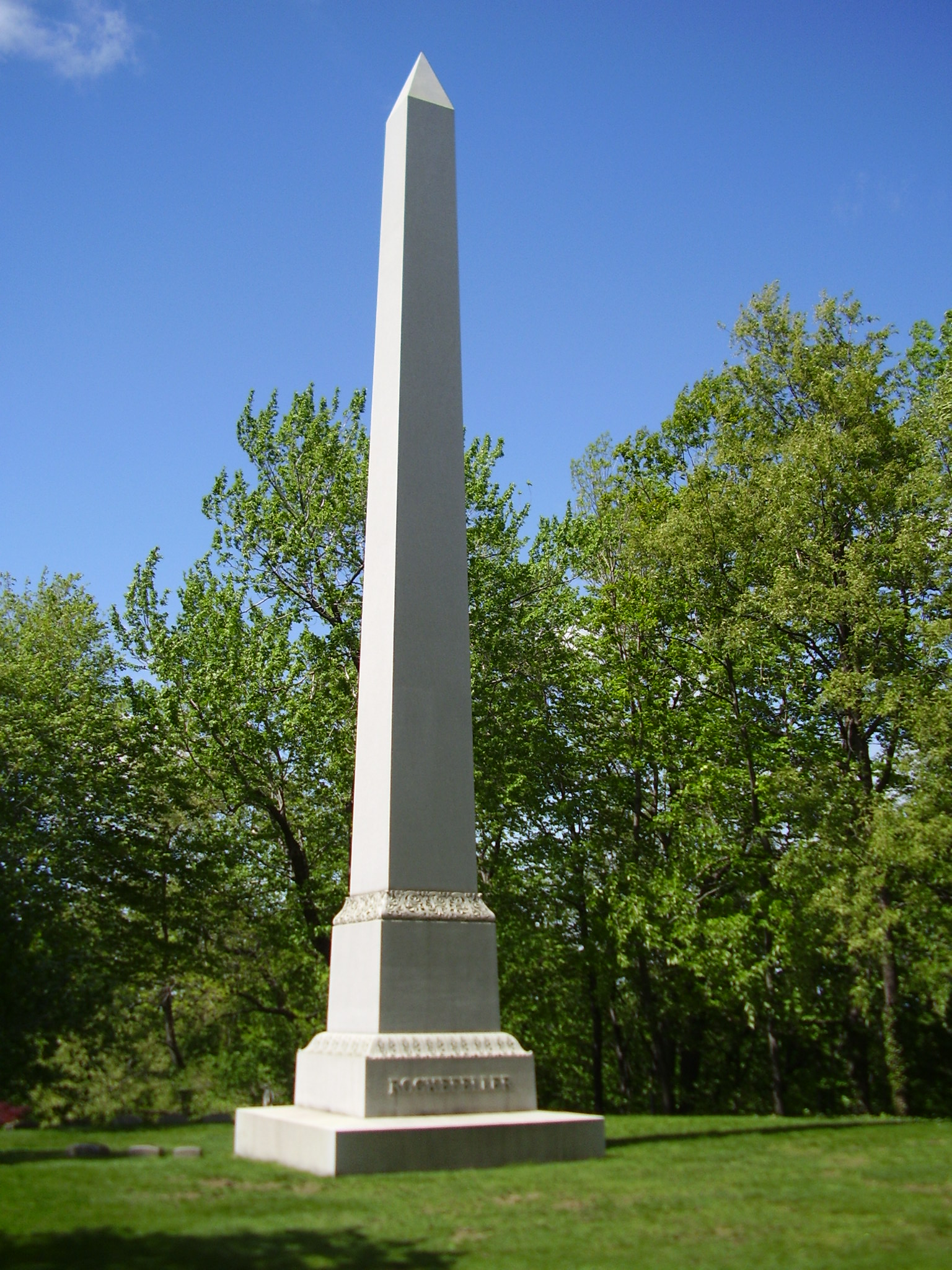
The obelisk at the Rockefeller family plot

In 1898, John D. Rockefeller, the co-founder and largest stockholder in Standard Oil and one of the wealthiest men in the United States, began the erection of a funerary monument in Lake View Cemetery. Some time before 1882, (Note: Rockefeller sold his father's plot at Woodland Cemetery in 1882, having already purchased the Lake View plot. Rockefeller's infant daughter, Alice, had died at the age of 13 months in 1870. She was buried at Lake View, although the location of her original grave is not clear. She is now interred at the Rockefeller family plot.) Rockfeller purchased a 17,000-square-foot (1,600 m^{2}) family plot on one of the cemetery's highest points, slightly northeast of the Garfield Memorial. Three people were buried in the John D. Rockefeller plot. Two of them were children of Frank Rockefeller, John's brother. They were William Scofield Rockefeller (81 days old, died on March 17, 1878) and Myra Rockefeller, 2 years and 81 days old, died on August 23, 1886). (Note: Frank Rockefeller had an extremely poor relationship with John D. Rockefeller, leading to a breach between the two which never healed. In 1900, Frank disinterred his two children from John's plot, and had them reinterred in his own family plot a short distance away at Lake View.) Rockefeller's mother, Eliza Rockefeller, died on March 28, 1889, in New York City. She was buried in the Rockefeller plot at Lake View on March 30. (Note: Laura Spelman Rockefeller, John D. Rockefeller's wife, died on March 12, 1915, in New York City. She was temporarily interred in the mausoleum of Rockefeller's business partner, John D. Archbold, at Sleepy Hollow Cemetery in Sleepy Hollow, New York. She was disinterred on August 9, and reinterred in Cleveland during a private ceremony at sunset on August 10.)

Construction began on the Rockefeller Monument in 1898. Quarried in Barre, Vermont, by the Wetmore and Morse Granite Co. of Montpelier, Vermont, several hundred tons of rock had to be blown before a piece of rock big enough for the obelisk could be found. The Egyptian-style obelisk alone was 51 feet 9 inches (15.77 m) high with a bottom 5 by 5 feet (1.5 by 1.5 m) square. (Note: The Plain Dealer newspaper reported the obelisk as 55 feet (17 m) high with a bottom 4 by 4 feet (1.2 by 1.2 m), as 52 feet (16 m) high with a bottom 5 by 5 feet (1.5 by 1.5 m), as 52.5 feet (16.0 m) high with a bottom 5 by 5 feet (1.5 by 1.5 m), and as 53 feet (16 m). The cemetery industry trade journal Park and Cemetery listed the obelisk as 53 feet (16 m) high with a bottom 5 by 5 feet (1.5 by 1.5 m).) It was the largest granite shaft ever quarried in the United States, and the second-largest single-piece shaft to be erected in the United States after Cleopatra's Needle in Central Park in New York City. The Plain Dealer newspaper believed it to be the tallest shaft ever erected over a private grave anywhere in the world. The first base of the pedestal was 14 by 14 feet (4.3 by 4.3 m) square and 3 feet (0.91 m) high. (Note: The first base is actually closer to 12 feet 3 inches (3.73 m) by 12 feet 3 inches (3.73 m). As of 2019, it had sunk about 0.5 feet (0.15 m) into the earth.) The second base was 9 feet 2 inches (2.79 m) by 9 feet 2 inches (2.79 m) and 3 feet 8 inches (1.12 m) high. The die was 6 feet 8 inches (2.03 m) by 6 feet 8 inches (2.03 m) and 7 feet (2.1 m) high. (Note: The die, or dado, is part of the pedestal of a column. The lowest part is the base or foot. Next is the die, which forms the main body of the pedestal. The cornice, or surbase molding, is atop the die and is the part on which the column actually rests.) The total height of the monument was 65 feet 10 inches (20.07 m). (Note: The Plain Dealer newspaper reported the monument's total height as 65 feet (20 m) and as 65 feet 5 inches (19.94 m). A trade industry journal put the height at 65 feet 8 inches (20.02 m).)

The Rockefeller obelisk was dressed in Vermont. It had minimal if graceful ornamental elements on the base, with the name "Rockefeller" on the second base. The New York, Chicago and St. Louis Railroad (the "Nickel Plate") transported the shaft and other elements of the monument from Vermont. The shaft alone weighed 80 short tons (73 t); combined with the bases and die, the monument's total weight was 135 short tons (122 t). (Note: Earlier, The Plain Dealer had estimated the shaft's weight at 100 short tons (91 t).) The obelisk was the heaviest item the railroad could move without straining its bridges. Even so, the railroad had to design and build special rail cars to carry the load, and build a heavy-duty spur from its main line to the quarry.

The Rockefeller monument arrived in Cleveland on Sunday, February 11, 1899. A house moving company used horses and a windlass to move the obelisk from the railroad tracks along Mayfield Road to the cemetery's Mayfield Road entrance. (Note: The movement was so slow that, after moving the obelisk just 300 feet (91 m), the company tried using an 8 horsepower gasoline engine attached to a wagon. This failed to move the obelisk, and the company went back to using horses and a windlass.) By March 3, the obelisk had only moved four blocks to reach Mayfield Place (now E. 124 Street), and was beginning to make its way up the steep hill which Mayfield Road climbed. At that time, the movers believed it would take only three weeks for the obelisk to make it the up 1,800-foot (550 m) hill. Weather and other delays hindered the shaft's progress, however, and it was up the hill and only halfway through the cemetery—and still 600 feet (180 m) short of its final destination—by June 25. A derrick to erect the obelisk was rented by W. F. Howland (the firm to which the Carabelli monument company had subcontracted the erection work), but the delays in moving the obelisk meant the derrick's use was required elsewhere. The derrick was erected again at Lake View about August 26. The first base was put in place on August 31. The second base was cemented to it on September 1 using a special French cement, and the die cemented to the second base on September 2. The obelisk was hoisted upright on September 11. The derrick's wooden superstructure proved too weak to lift the obelisk into the air, and had to be reinforced. The shaft was finally lifted into and cemented in place on September 12 while a large crowd of onlookers watched. Stoneworkers applied the finishing touches to the monument on September 13, 1899.

The Rockefeller Monument cost $50,000 ($1.94 million in 2025 dollars) to quarry and erect, and another $10,000 ($400,000 in 2025 dollars) to move.

== Continued improvement: 1900 to the Great Depression ==
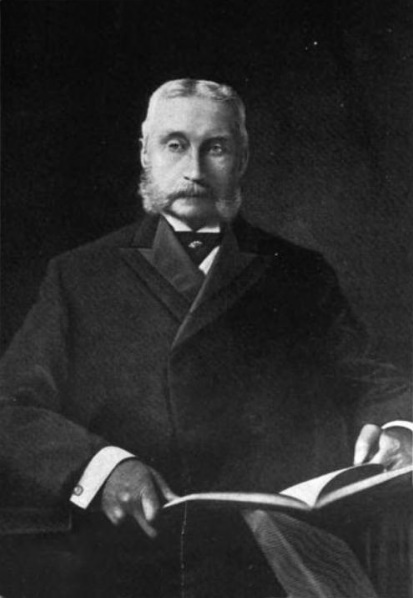
Henry R. Hatch, the president who led Lake View Cemetery back to financial prosperity and rapidly modernized operations.

In 1900, Lake View Cemetery had just over 10 percent (34 acres (14 ha)) of its land developed into cemetery plots. Lakes, streams, roads, and other features took up another 68 acres (28 ha). (Note: A report by the Village of East Cleveland reported that ponds, streams, and roads occupied only 35 acres (14 ha).) Undeveloped land remained heavily forested, with beech, elm, maple, and oak trees predominating.

=== Financial prosperity ===
Lot sales were extremely high in 1895, 1896, 1897, and 1898, helping to improve the cemetery's financial condition and making its bonds well-regarded for investment purposes. Lot sales declined significantly in 1899 and early 1900, but the cemetery still grossed $35,500 ($1.37 million in 2025 dollars) in sales revenue and counted more than 6,000 total interments by 1901. It had assets worth $1,119,302 ($43.3 million in 2025 dollars) and debts of just $626,290 ($24.2 million in 2025 dollars) Lake View was paying interest on its debt every six months, and the sinking fund was ample. The cemetery created an endowment fund in 1900, and put $7,207 into it ($300,000 in 2025 dollars). In July 1900, John D. Rockefeller gave Lake View Cemetery a gift of $10,000 ($400,000 in 2025 dollars), the first of several donations. Rockefeller's gift was used to open a section for the poor, to lay fresh water pipes in several sections, and for other improvements. (Note: Thee affordable lots cost $45 ($0 in 2025 dollars) and could accommodate up to five burials.) The cemetery received another $15,000 ($600,000 in 2025 dollars) in other cash donations during year as well.

Lake View Cemetery reported lot sales of $40,778 ($1.58 million in 2025 dollars) in 1901, assets of $1.19 million ($46.1 million in 2025 dollars), and debts of just $626,290 ($24.2 million in 2025 dollars). The following year, lot sales increased and the cemetery spent $25,000 ($900,000 in 2025 dollars) to make an unusually large number of improvements, rebuilding old roads, adding new roads, draining some land, and opening a number of new sections. John D. Rockefeller made another $10,000 donation ($400,000 in 2025 dollars), and the cemetery received another $12,272 ($500,000 in 2025 dollars) in donations from other sources. Lot sales rose again in 1903. Rockefeller made a third donation of $10,000 ($400,000 in 2025 dollars), and other donations totaled about $7,000 ($300,000 in 2025 dollars).

Lake View Cemetery continued to see lot sales rise in 1904, generating $55,230 ($1.98 million in 2025 dollars). Donations brought in another $8,186 ($300,000 in 2025 dollars). The cemetery made $20,040 ($700,000 in 2025 dollars) in improvements during the year, adding fresh water pipes, stormwater sewers, and building three tool houses (each with a telephone) in the cemetery. With expenses and supplies requiring just $22,148 ($800,000 in 2025 dollars), the cemetery had more than enough cash on hand for interest payments, the sinking fund, and scrip interest and redemption. Lot sales and associated revenues were even higher in 1905 ($63,201 [$2.26 million in 2025 dollars]), with expenses and supplies rising to $37,915 ($1.36 million in 2025 dollars) and improvement spending dropping to $14,840 ($500,000 in 2025 dollars). Lake View was so flush with cash that it made an extraordinary $10,000 ($400,000 in 2025 dollars) payment to the sinking fund. For the first time in years, Lake View Cemetery Association trustees discussed opening a number of new sections, and began discussing setting aside sections solely for the construction of large, expensive mausoleums.

=== Section 23 experiment and the death of Hatch ===
The 1910s and 1920s continued to be years of prosperity for Lake View Cemetery. Its maintenance staff had grown so much that it built an addition to its maintenance shop in 1909. It opened Section 23 in 1913. This section was "pre-designed" by cemetery staff, architects, landscape architects, and sculptors, many of them associated with the Cleveland School of Art. The landscaping around the lot's borders and at strategic points in its interior was designed to accommodate and complement only certain types of funerary monuments. In 18 of the 32 lots in these areas, the cemetery issued highly specific, narrow rules regulating the size and type of monument which could be erected. In the remaining 14 key lots, the cemetery "strongly suggested" to buyers that only certain kinds of funerary monuments be used in these locations (explicitly ruling out funerary vases). Headstones were allowed to rise only 4 inches (100 mm) above the surface of the earth. All local funerary monument companies were furnished with a booklet on monument design to assist them in designing gravestones appropriate for Section 23, and for all other sections at Lake View.

Lake View Cemetery suffered two setbacks in 1915. On January 28, the cemetery's old two-story wood office building burned to the ground. Maps, plot plans, and the blueprints for hundreds of mausoleums and monuments were lost. On May 20, Henry R. Hatch died suddenly, depriving Lake View of the energetic and visionary president who had led the organization since 1896.

Hatch left a cemetery in excellent financial condition. Lake View was making so much money that cemetery was able to purchase $50,000 ($1,260,000 in 2025 dollars) worth of Liberty Loan bonds in 1917 to support the American cause in World War I. In a snapshot of the cemetery's financial success, the trustees reported that it made a surplus of $62,165 ($1,200,000 in 2025 dollars) in 1922. It had assets totaling $3,021,888 ($38.4 million in 2025 dollars), which included an endowment and sinking fund of $1,704,737 ($32.2 million in 2025 dollars). Its outstanding debts were $2,016,192 ($38.1 million in 2025 dollars).

=== Modernization, ownership of the Garfield Memorial, and push east ===
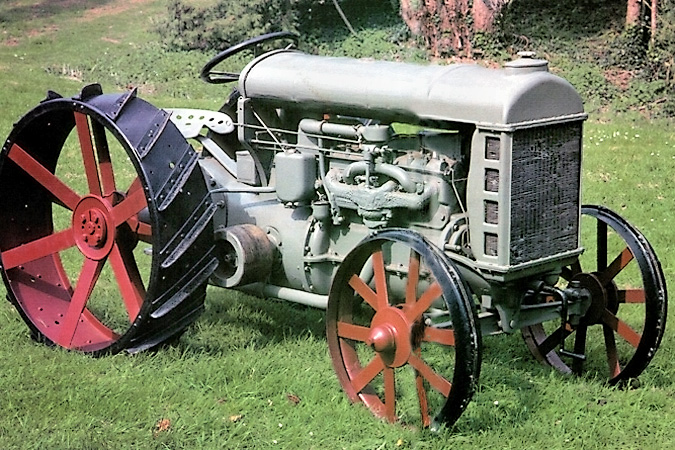
A Fordson Model F tractor, the type of tractor used by Lake View Cemetery beginning about 1922

Part of the cemetery's success was attributed to its use of modern technology. For years, Lake View maintenance staff had used 50 lawn mowers and 30 hand-held scythe lawn trimmers. In 1917, the cemetery purchased a two-ton truck from the Acme Motor Truck Co. of Cadillac, Michigan. The truck was used to haul materials from Lake View's quarry around the cemetery for the construction of buildings and macadam roads and the setting of headstone foundations. By 1922, the cemetery also used Fordson tractors to dig graves, place monuments, clear snow, and maintain roads. About 1923, Lake View purchased two one-ton Ford trucks for general-duty use around the cemetery. Cemetery shops manufactured a "tent wagon", (Note: The funeral marquee was carted by this device.) a "grave wagon" (Note: This wagon could carry a folded "cabinet" for holding back earth in newly-dug graves; a grave carpet for covering earth from a newly-dug grave; grave vault; and a device for lowering the grave vault into the grave.) and both metal- and concrete-lined "dump carts". Originally developed in 1913, the dump carts were used to carry earth from graves. Up to six carts could be attached to a single Ford truck.

In late October 1923, the Garfield National Monument Association turned the Garfield Memorial over to Lake View Cemetery. Most of the Monument Association's members had died, and its charter did not permit for a self-perpetuating board. After accepting title to the memorial and its land, Lake View Cemetery immediately ended the practice of charging a 10 cent ($2 in 2025 dollars) admission fee to the memorial. Lake View also began cleaning, repairing, and rehabilitating the memorial.

Increasingly, Lake View Cemetery turned its attention to its Mayfield Road border and entrance. The city of Cleveland Heights, incorporated as a hamlet in 1901, included within its boundaries the southern portion of Lake View. Cleveland Heights grew very rapidly. Its population rose from 1,564 at the time of incorporation to 2,576 in 1910, a 64.7 percent increase. By 1920, Cleveland Heights had 15,264 residents, a six-fold increase. Cleveland Heights incorporated as a city in 1921. Lake View Cemetery was the burial ground of choice for the upper-middle class suburb. Although the Mayfield Road gate was locked, the cemetery gave keys to the gate to those Cleveland Heights residents who were lotholders.

== Great Depression and war: 1929 to 1945 ==
The Great Depression put significant financial stress on Lake View Cemetery. Those who had purchased large lots often failed to keep up payments. Cemetery officials allowed them to sell back a portion of their lots in order to retain at least some burial ground. When the owners of large lots defaulted on their purchase contracts completely, Lake View threatened to disinter the bodies in the plot and move them to single-grave lots in another part of the cemetery and re-sell the large plot. The cemetery responded to the economic crisis with retrenchment as well. It lowered the price of a single grave by 20 percent, to $60 ($1,160 in 2025 dollars). The cemetery also cut wages for all maintenance workers and grave diggers making more than 55 cents an hour ($11 in 2025 dollars), and laid off 10 men. In response, workers organized a trade union in 1937 under the auspices of the Arborists and Landscapers Union, LIUNA Local 344, AFL.

Manpower shortages hit Lake View Cemetery during World War II as laborers enlisted in the military or were drafted. To assist in the war effort, the cemetery allowed large portions of unused land to be converted into Victory gardens. Wartime inflation and the rapidly declining number of wealthy families in the Cleveland area hurt lot sales. The cemetery subsequently shifted its marketing efforts to focus on middle and working class families.

== Latter half of the 20th century ==
As more people chose cremation as a burial option in the latter half of the 20th century, Lake View Cemetery responded by constructing and opening a cremains mausoleum in 1990. Any member of the public may purchase a niche in the mausoleum for cremains.

== 21st century ==
Lake View Cemetery has been under persistent financial stress since the start of the new millennium. Operating deficits are common, and the LVCA has occasionally cut back services and staff. Even though the cemetery is a significant tourist attraction and the site of a presidential memorial, Lake View received no local, state, or federal funding as of 2017.

In 2006, the Lake View Cemetery Foundation made education and tourism its top priorities. From 2001 to 2010, the number of individuals participating in officially sponsored foundation tours increased to 10,000 from 3,000, while the number of sponsored educational programs nearly doubled from 10 to 19.

Lake View Cemetery spent $5 million in 2016 and 2017 conserving, repairing, and upgrading the James A. Garfield Memorial's structural elements. This included reinforcing beams and columns in the basement,

In 2019, the cemetery began a multi-million-dollar project to clean the exterior and repoint any damaged or missing mortar. It is the first time in the memorial's history that the exterior has been cleaned.

Lake View Cemetery celebrated its 150th anniversary with two years of events in 2019 and 2020.

== About the cemetery ==
The garden cemetery is located in the "heights" area of Greater Cleveland, with a view of Lake Erie to the north. The burying ground had 285 acres (1.15 km^{2}) of land in 2007, with more than 104,000 burials. There are two entrances, on Euclid Avenue and Mayfield Road.

The cemetery provides a plot in its Veterans Section free of charge to all honorably discharged U.S. armed forces veterans.

=== Governance ===
The nonprofit Lake View Cemetery Association owns and governs the cemetery. Originally, membership in the association was open to anyone who purchased a lot, making the association akin to a church or a club. Members elected a 20-member board of trustees (with four seats up each year), and a board secretary. The board met quarterly, while a five-member executive committee of the board met monthly. The board appointed the cemetery's president, vice president, and superintendent. Income from lot sales was used primarily to pay for staff salaries and the maintenance and improvement of the grounds. Among the many board and executive office positions, only the superintendent and the board secretary received pay.

The Lake View Cemetery Association reincorporated as a nonprofit organization in 1926, with the LVCA now acting as a nonprofit association for the benefit for lotholders. Annual meetings of lotholders to elect directors and officers were no longer held. Instead, a self-perpetuating board of directors was elected which continues to own and govern the cemetery.

Lake View's annual budget in 2012 was $6.1 million ($8.55 million in 2025 dollars). Income from lots sales and services to families made up 60 percent of all cemetery revenue in 2001, and 80 percent of all revenue in 2012. Charitable contributions make up much of the remaining income. The Lake View Cemetery Foundation provides a significant portion of this charitable income. Foundation donations were 6 percent of all cemetery revenue in 2001, rising to 16 percent of all revenues in 2011. As of 2017, roughly half of the cemetery's annual costs were spent on maintaining the grounds, headstones, monuments, and mausoleums. The other half goes to staff and office operations.

=== Leadership ===
Following is a partial list of the presidents of the Lake View Cemetery Association. The president oversaw the day-to-day operations of the cemetery along with the superintendent.

- Jeptha H. Wade, 1869 to 1879
- Joseph Perkins, 1879 to 1885 (his death)
- Jeptha H. Wade, 1885 to 1890 (his death)
- William Edwards, 1890 to 1893
- Timothy Doane Crocker, 1893 to 1896
- Henry R. Hatch, 1896 to 1915
- Douglas Perkins, 1915 to 1921 (his death)
- Jerome B. Zerbe, 1921 to 1924
- Francis F. Prentiss, 1925 to 1926

=== Lake View Cemetery Foundation ===
The Lake View Cemetery Foundation was established by the Lake View Cemetery Association in 1986 as a 501(c)(13) organization. (Note: Internal Revenue Service regulation 501(c)(13) is a tax-exempt category specifically for cemeteries.) The foundation was originally chartered to raise money to repair and restore the James A. Garfield Memorial and to establish a fund for its ongoing maintenance. After the renovation was completed, the foundation expanded its goals to include enhancing, maintaining, and preserving the botanical gardens, buildings, horticulture, landscape, monuments, and areas at Lake View Cemetery to benefit the general public. The foundation's new mission specifically embraced education and outreach programs.

Although the foundation provides assistance to the cemetery in maintaining historic buildings and monuments and historic or horticulturally significant aspects of the grounds, it is both separately governed and administered from the cemetery. The foundation's 2012 annual budget was $567,000 ($800,000 in 2025 dollars). Foundation assistance is not unrestricted, but targeted to meet the goals established by the foundation's board of directors and its strategic plan. Charitable donations make up roughly half of the foundation's annual income, although these can vary widely from year to year. Donations provided 65 percent of income in 2013. Investment income also varies considerably over time, but has averaged about 30 percent of all foundation revenues between 2002 and 2012. Service fee income is a relatively negligible 2 percent of all revenues.

=== Notable sites and funerary monuments ===
The James A. Garfield Memorial is the most prominent point of interest at Lake View Cemetery. The ornate interior features a large marble statue, stained glass, bas relief, and various historical relics from Garfield's life and presidency. The monument also serves as a scenic observation deck and picnic area. President and Mrs. Garfield are entombed in the lower level crypt, their coffins placed side by side and visible to memorial visitors.

Lake View Cemetery is home to the Wade Memorial Chapel, which features an interior designed by Louis Tiffany. Behind the chapel is a large pond.

The cemetery is famous for its numerous statues of angels, sculpted in a Victorian style. A well-known memorial, the Angel of Death Victorious at the gravesite of the Haserot family, was created by sculptor Herman Matzen.

== In popular culture ==
The cemetery is among those profiled in the 2005 PBS documentary A Cemetery Special.

Scenes of the 2014 film Captain America: The Winter Soldier were filmed at the flood control dam at the cemetery.

== Notable interments ==
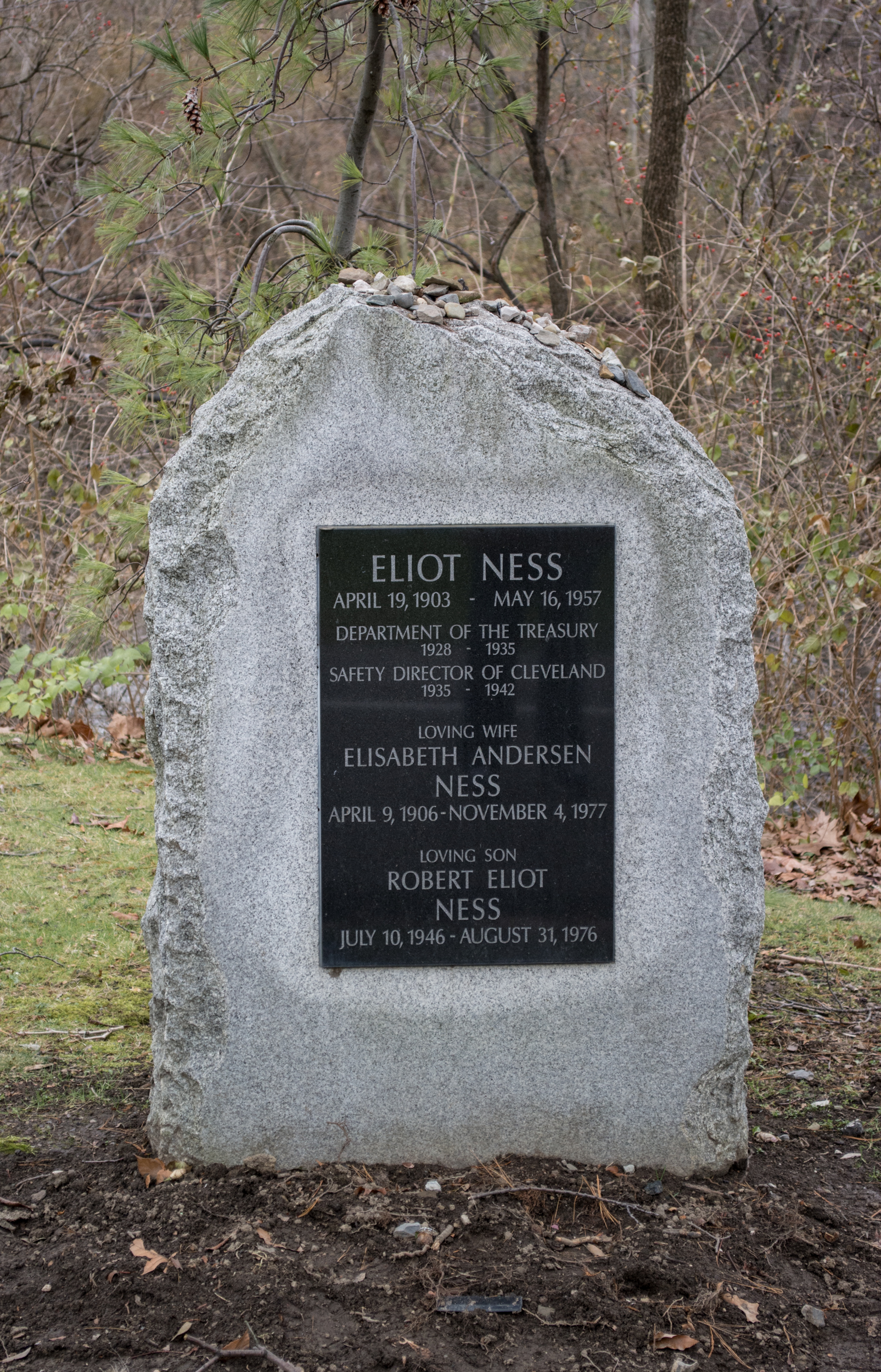
The cenotaph of Eliot Ness inside the cemetery

Notable people buried at Lake View Cemetery include:

- Newton D. Baker (1871–1937), Mayor of Cleveland and U.S. Secretary of War during World War I
- Ernest Ball (1878–1927), composer and author of "When Irish Eyes are Smiling"
- Frances Payne Bolton (1885–1977), Member, U.S. House of Representatives
- Helene Hathaway Britton (1879–1950), owner of the St. Louis Cardinals
- Charles Francis Brush (1849–1929), inventor of the modern arc light and businessman
- Theodore E. Burton (1851–1929), Member, U.S. Senate
- William B. Castle (1814–1872), last Mayor of Ohio City, Mayor of Cleveland (Note: He was originally interred beneath an obelisk in the Castle family plot at the Monroe Street Cemetery in Cleveland. He was disinterred at a later date, and re-interred at Lake View Cemetery beneath a funerary monument featuring St. John the Evangelist.)
- Ray Chapman (1891–1920), baseball player for the Cleveland Indians
- Charles W. Chesnutt (1858–1932), an African-American attorney and author
- Henry Chisholm (1822–1891), father of the Cleveland steel industry (Note: He was first temporarily interred at Cleveland's Woodland Cemetery.)
- Henry D. Coffinberry (1841–1912), industrialist, founder of the Cleveland Shipbuilding Company
- James Corrigan (1846–1908), industrialist, founder of Corrigan, McKinney & Co.
- George Washington Crile (1864–1943), co-founder of the Cleveland Clinic and the first surgeon to successfully perform a blood transfusion
- Harvey Cushing (1869–1939), pioneer neurosurgeon
- Robert B. Dennis (1819–1884), member of the Ohio House of Representatives
- John A. Ellsler (1821–1903), actor and theatre manager
- Lethia Cousins Fleming (1876–1963), American suffragist, teacher, civil rights activist and politician.
- Alan Freed (1921–1965), radio disc jockey who popularized the term "rock and roll "
- Abram Garfield (1872–1958), architect
- James A. Garfield (1831–1881), President of the United States
- Lucretia Garfield (1832–1918), First Lady of the United States
- Edward B. Greene (1878—1957), banking, mining, and steel company executive; chairman of Cleveland-Cliffs
- Marcus A. Hanna (1837–1904), U.S. Senator and Republican Party boss
- Gertrude Harrison (1871–1938), professional golfer
- Stephen V. Harkness (1818–1888), investor and founding co-partner of Standard Oil
- Minnie Hartness (1867-1957), stenographer, writer, lecturer, and lady of letters
- John Hay (1838–1905), former United States Secretary of State and aide to President Abraham Lincoln
- Myron T. Herrick (1854–1929), Governor of Ohio, U.S. ambassador to France
- Adella Prentiss Hughes (1869–1950), founder of the Cleveland Orchestra
- Mortimer Dormer Leggett (1821–1896), lawyer, educator, Union Army Major General, Commissioner of Patents
- Al Lerner (1933–2002), owner of the Cleveland Browns
- Flora Stone Mather (1852–1909), philanthropist
- Garrett Morgan (1877–1963), inventor of the gas mask and the three-colored traffic light
- Eliot Ness (Cenotaph, 1903–1957), Cleveland Safety Director and a member of The Untouchables
- George Willis Pack (1831–1906), timber tycoon
- Charles A. Otis Sr. (1827–1905), businessman and Mayor of Cleveland
- Arthur L. Parker (1885–1945), founder of Parker Hannifin Corporation
- George W. "Peggy" Parratt (1883–1959), a professional football player who threw the first legal forward pass in a professional game
- Oliver Hazard Payne (1839–1917) American businessman and organizer of the American Tobacco trust
- Harvey Pekar (1939–2010), comic book writer known for the American Splendor series
- Dave Pope (1921–1999), professional baseball player
- John D. Rockefeller (1839–1937), founder of the Standard Oil Company and philanthropist
- James Salisbury (1823–1905), inventor of the Salisbury steak
- Viktor Schreckengost (1906–2008), industrial designer, teacher, sculptor, and artist
- Heinrich Christian Schwan (1819–1905), third president of the Lutheran Church–Missouri Synod
- Henry Alden Sherwin (1842–1916), co-founder of the Sherwin-Williams Company
- Anthony J. Stastny (1885–1923), composer, founder and president of Tin Pan Alley music publisher, A. J. Stasny Music Co.
- Carl B. Stokes (1927–1996), Mayor of Cleveland, United States ambassador
- Louis Stokes (1925–2015), Member, U.S. House of Representatives
- Amasa Stone (1818–1883), industrialist and philanthropist
- Worthy S. Streator (1816–1902), physician, railroad baron, founder of Streator, Illinois, Ohio State Senator, first mayor of East Cleveland, Ohio
- Mantis James Van Sweringen (1881–1935), railroad and real estate baron
- Oris Paxton Van Sweringen (1879–1936), railroad and real estate baron
- Jeptha Homer Wade (1811–1890), founder of Western Union
- Thomas H. White (1836-1914), founder of the White Sewing Machine Company
- Windsor T. White (1866–1958), founder and president of the White Motor Company

== See also ==
- List of burial places of presidents and vice presidents of the United States

== Bibliography ==
- Armstrong, Foster; Klein, Richard; Armstrong, Cara (1992). A Guide to Cleveland's Sacred Landmarks. Kent, Ohio: Kent State University Press. ISBN 9780873384544.
- Association of American Cemetery Superintendents (1900). Proceedings of the Fourteenth Annual Convention of the Association of American Cemetery Superintendents. Columbus, Ohio: Association of American Cemetery Superintendents. hdl:2027/uiug.30112052637888.
- Avery, Elroy McKendree (1918). A History of Cleveland and Its Environs, the Heart of New Connecticut. Volume I. Chicago: Lewis Publishing Co.
- Avery, Elroy McKendree (1918). A History of Cleveland and Its Environs, the Heart of New Connecticut. Volume III. Chicago: Lewis Publishing Co.
- Badal, James Jessen (2001). In the Wake of the Butcher: Cleveland's Torso Murders. Kent, Ohio: Kent State University Press. ISBN 9780873386890.
- Bolton, C.E. (1901). The Mayor's Message and Sixth Annual Reports of East Cleveland, Ohio. Cleveland: Imperial Press.
- Brown, E. E. (1881). The Life and Public Services of James A. Garfield. Boston: D.L. Guernsey.
- The Cemetery Hand Book. A Manual of Useful Information on Cemetery Development and Management. Chicago: Allied Arts Publishing Co. 1921. hdl:2027/mdp.39015035928525.
- "Cemetery Trucks and Trailers". Park and Cemetery. June 1923. pp. 105–107. hdl:2027/mdp.39015082627699.
- Chernow, Ron (1998). Titan. New York: Random House. ISBN 9780679438083.
- Comer, Lucretia G. (1965). Harry Garfield's First Forty Years: A Man of Action in a Troubled World. New York: Vantage Press.
- Crawford, Brad; Manning, William (2005). Ohio. New York: Compass American Guides. ISBN 9781400013944.
- Dale, T. Nelson (1923). The Commercial Granites of New England. Bulletin 738. Washington, D.C.: U.S. Geological Survey, Department of the Interior.
- Dyer, Bob (2003). The Top 20 Moments in Cleveland Sports: Tremendous Tales of Heroes and Heartbreaks. Cleveland: Gray & Co. ISBN 9781598510300.
- Eidelberg, Martin P.; Gray, Nina; Hofer, Margaret K. (2007). A New Light on Tiffany: Clara Driscoll and the Tiffany Girls. London: New York Historical Society. ISBN 9781904832355.
- Firlik, Katrina (2006). Another Day in the Frontal Lobe: A Brain Surgeon Exposes Life on the Inside. New York: Random House. ISBN 9781400063208.
- Flanagan, Martin (2017). Marvel Studios Phenomenon: Inside a Transmedia Universe. New York: Bloomsbury. ISBN 9781501338533.
- Gilman, Daniel Coit; Peck, Harry Thurston; Colby, Frank Moore, eds. (1905). The New International Encyclopaedia. Volume 5. New York: Dodd, Mead & Co.
- Gregor, Sharon E. (2006). Forest Hill: The Rockefeller Estate. Charleston, S.C.: Arcadia Publishing. ISBN 9780738540948.
- Haddad, Gladys (2007). Flora Stone Mather: Daughter of Cleveland's Euclid Avenue and Ohio's Western Reserve. Kent, Ohio: Kent State University Press. ISBN 978-0-87338-899-3.
- Hannibal, Joseph T. (2007). "Teaching With Tombstones: Geology at the Cemetery". In Shaffer, Nelson; DeChurch, Deborah (eds.). Proceedings of the 40th Forum on the Geology of Industrial Minerals. Bloomington, Ind.: Indiana University Bloomington.
- "Harmonizing Monuments and Cemetery Lawn". Park and Cemetery. September 1914. pp. 226–228.
- Hawkins, H.H. (January 1923). "Cemetery Engineering Work". Park and Cemetery. pp. 273–274.
- Johnson, Crisfield (1879). History of Cuyahoga County, Ohio. Cleveland: D.W. Ensign & Co.
- Kehoe, Wayne (2007). Cleveland's University Circle. Charleston, S.C.: Arcadia Publishing. ISBN 9781439618875.
- Kleinberg, S.J. (1991). The Shadow of the Mills: Working-Class Families in Pittsburgh, 1870–1907. Pittsburgh: University of Pittsburgh Press. ISBN 9780822954453.
- Lossing, Benson John (2007) [1882]. A Biography of James A. Garfield. New York: H.S. Goodspeed & Company. ISBN 9780795017575.
- Maguire, Robert H. (2016). "The Sanctity of the Grave: White Concepts and American Indian Graves". In Layton, Robert (ed.). Conflict in the Archaeology of Living Traditions. New York: Routledge. ISBN 9781138161313.
- McKean, Hugh F. (1980). The "Lost" Treasures of Louis Comfort Tiffany. New York: Doubleday. ISBN 9780385095853.
- Mitchell, Sarah (2008). Cleveland's Little Italy. Charleston, S.C.: Arcadia Publishing. ISBN 9780738552132.
- Morse, Kenneth S.P. (1955). A History of the Cleveland Streetcars From the Time of Electrification. Baltimore: Sutherland Press.
- Morton, Marian (2002). Cleveland Heights: The Making of an Urban Suburb. Charleston, S.C.: Arcadia Publishing. ISBN 9780738523842.
- Morton, Marian (2004). Cleveland's Lake View Cemetery. Charleston, S.C.: Arcadia Publishing. ISBN 9780738532301.
- Nowak, Martin S. (2010). The White House in Mourning: Deaths and Funerals of Presidents in Office. Jefferson, N.C.: McFarland & Co. ISBN 9780786447756.
- Orth, Samuel P. (1910). A History of Cleveland, Ohio. Volume 1. Chicago: S.J. Clarke Publishing Co.
- Orth, Samuel P. (1910). A History of Cleveland, Ohio. Volume 3. Chicago: S.J. Clarke Publishing.
- Owen, Lorrie K., ed. (2008). Ohio Historic Places Dictionary. Volume 1. Hamburg, Mich.: State History Publications. ISBN 9781878592705.
- Parker, John Henry (2004). A Concise Dictionary Architectural Terms: Illustrated. Mineola, N.Y.: E.P. Dutton. ISBN 9780486433028.
- Payne, William (1876). Cleveland Illustrated. Cleveland: Fairbanks, Benedict & Co.
- Phillips, Kevin (2003). William McKinley. New York: Times Books. ISBN 9781466866430.
- Piirto, Jane (2011). Creativity for 21st Century Skills: How to Embed Creativity into the Curriculum. Rotterdam: Sense. ISBN 9789460914614.
- Rose, William Ganson (1990). Cleveland: The Making of a City. Kent, Ohio: Kent State University Press. ISBN 9780873384285.
- Rutkow, Ira M. (2006). James A. Garfield: The 20th President. New York: New York Times Books. ISBN 9780805069501.
- Segall, Grant (2005). John D. Rockefeller: Anointed With Oil. Toledo, Ohio: Great Neck Publishing. ISBN 9781423774327.
- Smith, David Norman (2008). "Anti-Semitism". Encyclopedia of Race, Ethnicity, and Society. Volume 1. Los Angeles: Sage Publications. ISBN 9781412926942.
- Thayer, William M. (1889). From Log-Cabin to the White House: The Story of President Garfield's Life. London: Hodder and Stoughton.
- Timberlake, Richard H. (1993). Monetary Policy in the United States: An Intellectual and Institutional History. Chicago: University of Chicago Press. ISBN 9780226803821.
- Timoshenko, Vladimir P. (June 1930). "Role of Agricultural Fluctuations in the Business Cycle". Michigan Business Studies. OCLC 1640818.
- Toman, Jim; Hays, Blaine S. (1996). Horse Trails to Regional Rails: The Story of Public Transit in Greater Cleveland. Kent, Ohio: Kent State University Press. ISBN 9780873385473.
- Vigil, Vicki Blum (2007). Cemeteries of Northeast Ohio: Stones, Symbols and Stories. Cleveland: Gray & Company. ISBN 9781598510256.
- Weaver, G.S. (1897). The Lives and Graves of Our Presidents. Chicago: National Book Concern.
- Wicker, Elmus (2000). Banking Panics of the Gilded Age. New York: Cambridge University Press. ISBN 9780521770231.
- Young, Dennis R. (2017). Financing Nonprofits and Other Social Enterprises: A Benefits Approach. Cheltenham, U.K.: Edward Elgar Publishing. ISBN 9781783478279.
- Zurcher, Neil (2008). Ohio Oddities: A Guide to the Curious Attractions of the Buckeye State. Cleveland: Gray & Co. ISBN 9781598510478.
