= William Perry Fogg =

American author and inspiration for Phileas Fogg (1826–1909)

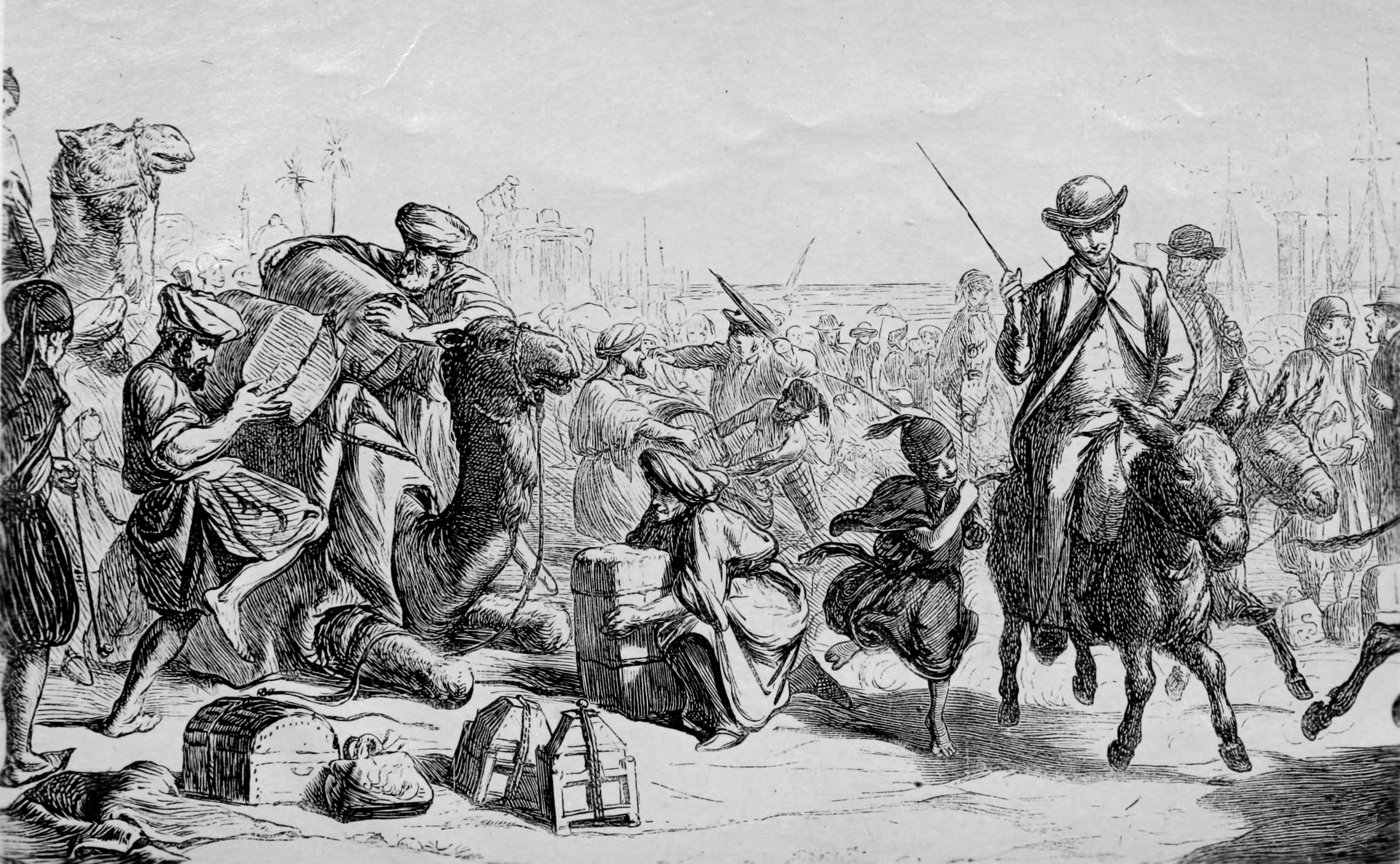
Steamer arrives at a quay in Alexandria – Round the World Letters (1872)

William Perry Fogg (27 July 1826 – 8 May 1909) was an American chinaware merchant, adventurer and travel author, who was the inspiration for Phileas Fogg in the 1873 novel Around the World in 80 Days.

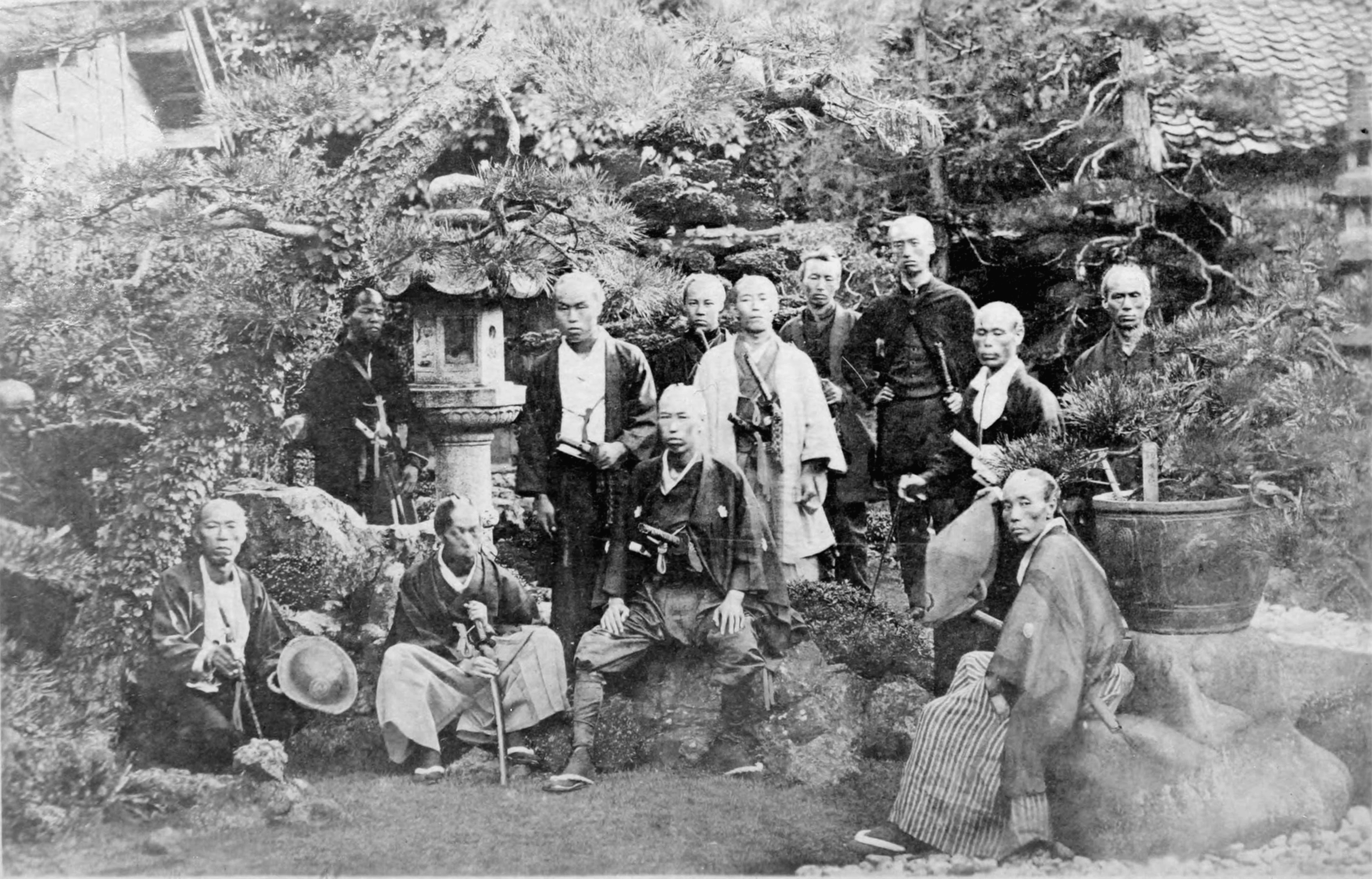
"Group of Japanese Officers" - Round the World Letters (1872)

== Early life and marriage ==
Fogg was born in Exeter, New Hampshire, to Josiah Fogg and Hannah née Pecker. As a child, his family moved to Cleveland, Ohio. In 1852, he married Mary Ann Gould, with whom he had two daughters: Annie and Helen Fogg.

== Career ==
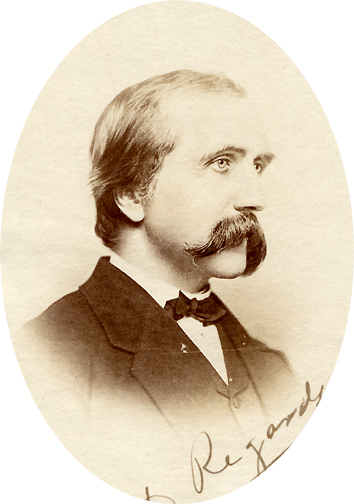
William Perry Fogg in 1872

In Cleveland, Fogg set himself up as a seller of chinaware. He joined, and was later President, of the New England Society, founded in 1853 to encourage unity among the descendants of New England pioneers. Fogg became interested in city government; in 1866, he was appointed to its Board of Commissioners. Along with Herman M. Chapin, the mayor of Cleveland, Fogg and the other commissioners wrote the Metropolitan Police Act of 1866. In 1868 Fogg began what he became most famous for, world travels, during which he became one of the first Americans to travel through central Japan.

From 1870 The Cleveland Leader publicized his travels by publishing the letters that he wrote home, which were later privately published in 1872 as Round the World: Letters from Japan, China, India and Egypt. In these letters, he described traveling by train from Cleveland to San Francisco, California, via Salt Lake City, Utah, where he had an interview with Brigham Young. He then boarded a Pacific Mail Steamer from San Francisco to Japan, following whih he visited China (including Hong Kong), Singapore, Malacca and Penang. He then moved on to India before traveling from Bombay to Suez, where he took the Suez Canal to Cairo and saw the Pyramids. His next book Arabistan, or The Land of the Arabian Nights, published in 1872 in England, covered his travels through Egypt, Arabia, Persia and Baghdad. His last book was a revised edition, published in America, of Land of the Arabian Nights. Fogg was the inspiration for Phileas Fogg in the 1873 novel Around the World in 80 Days.

On his return to the United States, in 1877, he bought the Herald Publishing Co. in partnership with a lawyer, Richard C. Parsons. The business failed, and Parsons returned to his legal practice, while Fogg resumed his international travels.

== Last years and death ==
On his final return to the United States, in 1901 Fogg moved to Roselle, New Jersey, and in 1908 to Morris Plains until his death in the following year.
