= Nathan P. Payne =

American politician

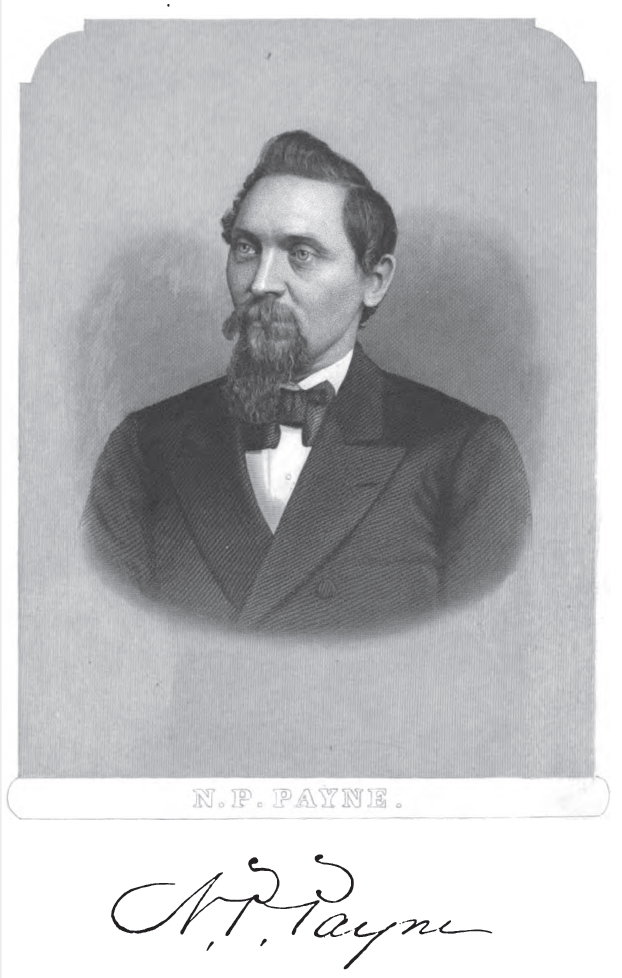
- Nathan P. Payne circa 1875

24th Mayor of Cleveland
- In office 1875–1876
- Preceded by: Charles A. Otis Sr.
- Succeeded by: William G. Rose

Personal details
- Born: Nathan Perry Payne; August 13, 1837 Cleveland, Ohio, U.S.
- Died: May 12, 1885 (aged 47) Cleveland, Ohio, U.S.
- Party: Democratic Party
- Parent(s): Henry B. Payne; Mary Perry Payne
- Education: Brown University

Nathan Perry Payne (August 13, 1837 – May 12, 1885) was the mayor of Cleveland, Ohio, from 1875 to 1876. He was a Democrat.

== Early life ==
Payne was born in Cleveland, Ohio, on August 13, 1837. He was the oldest son of Mary (née Perry) Payne and Henry B. Payne, a former U.S. Representative and U.S. Senator from Ohio. He attended local schools, and Pierce Academy in Middleborough, Massachusetts. Ill health caused him to return home before entering Brown University.

== Career ==
In 1855, he took charge of McIntosh nurseries, and in 1857 he went to work for a coal dealer as an accountant. In 1860, he formed Cross, Payne & Co., which eventually became known as Payne, Newton & Co.

At the outbreak of the U.S. Civil War, Payne enlisted in the Cleveland Grays, and towards the end of the War, he reenlisted as one of the "Hundred Day Men" volunteers.

=== Political career ===
Payne served two terms on the Cleveland Board of Education and served several times, for a total of six years, on the Cleveland City Council between 1862 and 1872.

In 1875, he was elected Mayor of Cleveland as a Democrat in the strongly Republican city, after serving two terms on the board of education and six years on the city council.

== Personal life ==
Payne, like his younger brother Oliver Hazard Payne, never married. In his later years, he lived with his maternal grandmother, Mrs. Nathan Perry, Jr. (the former Paulina Skinner).

He died at his home in Cleveland on May 11, 1885, as "one of the most prominent and popular men in Cleveland." His funeral was held at his residence, 664 Euclid Avenue, and the service was conducted by Dr. James A. Bolles, the Rector of Trinity Church, and the pallbearers were Amos Townsend, John H. Farley, Gen. James A. Barnett, Jacob Mueller, Charles Otis, L. M. Coe, John Tod, and W. J. McKinnie. He was buried at Lake View Cemetery.

Political offices
Preceded by Charles A. Otis	Mayor of Cleveland; 1875–1876	Succeeded by William G. Rose
