= Henry B. Payne =

American politician (1810–1896)

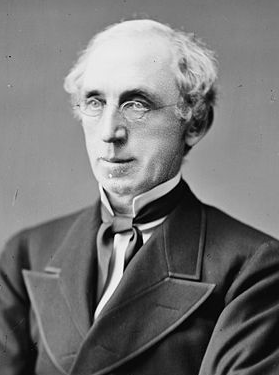
- Payne c. 1870–80

United States Senator from Ohio
- In office March 4, 1885 – March 3, 1891
- Preceded by: George H. Pendleton
- Succeeded by: Calvin S. Brice

Member of the U.S. House of Representatives from Ohio's 20th district
- In office March 4, 1875 – March 3, 1877
- Preceded by: Richard C. Parsons
- Succeeded by: Amos Townsend

Member of the Ohio Senate from the Cuyahoga County district
- In office December 3, 1849 – January 4, 1852
- Preceded by: Franklin T. Backus
- Succeeded by: Harvey Rice

Personal details
- Born: November 30, 1810 Hamilton, New York, U.S.
- Died: September 9, 1896 (aged 85) Cleveland, Ohio, U.S.
- Resting place: Lake View Cemetery; Cleveland, Ohio
- Party: Democratic
- Spouse: Mary Perry Payne
- Relations: William Collins Whitney; Frances P. Bolton; Oliver Payne Bolton; Michael Whitney Straight
- Children: 6 including Nathan, Oliver
- Parent(s): Elisha Payne; Esther Douglass Payne
- Education: Hamilton College

Henry B. Payne (November 30, 1810 – September 9, 1896) was an American politician from Ohio. Moving to Ohio from his native New York in 1833, he quickly established himself in law and business while becoming a local leader in Democratic politics. After serving in the Ohio Senate, Payne was elected to a single term in the United States House of Representatives in 1874. In the House, he worked unsuccessfully for a compromise in the debate over whether all of the nation's currency should be backed by gold. He was defeated for reelection, but served on the Electoral Commission that convened in early 1877 to resolve the dispute over the results of the 1876 presidential election.

He ran for the Democratic presidential nomination in 1880, but lost to Winfield Scott Hancock, who would go on to lose the general election to James A. Garfield. He was elected to the United States Senate in 1884. His election by the Ohio legislature was tainted with charges of bribery, but after investigation by the Senate, Payne was permitted to keep his seat. In the Senate, he voted for moderate tariff reforms and against the Interstate Commerce Act of 1887, but was otherwise a reliable Democratic vote. He did not run for reelection, and died in 1896.

== Early life ==
Henry Payne (Note: He originally had no middle initial, but according to a granddaughter, he added the "B." later in life to give his name "a more pleasing effect.") was born in Hamilton, Madison County, New York, in 1810, to Elisha and Esther (née Douglass) Payne. Both of his parents were Connecticut natives who had moved to New York in the 1790s.

Payne attended the common schools and graduated from Hamilton College in 1832. After graduation, Payne read law in the Canandaigua office of John C. Spencer, a Whig politician and future Secretary of War. While working there, Payne became good friends with future United States Senator and 1860 Democratic presidential candidate Stephen A. Douglas, who was studying law with another local attorney.

== Career ==
In 1833, Payne moved to Cleveland, Ohio, then a town of just 3000 people. Douglas preceded him there, but was ill, and Payne's first task on arrival in Ohio was to nurse his friend back to health. Under Sherlock J. Andrews, Payne continued to study law, and was admitted to the bar in 1834. He opened his own practice the same year, forming a partnership with future United States federal judge Hiram V. Willson. The firm became successful quickly; within ten years Payne and Willson was among the top firms in Ohio.

Payne's law practice continued to be successful through the early 1840s, but after suffering from attacks of hemoptysis (bleeding in the lungs), he was forced to curtail his activities. Instead, he devoted his time to business affairs and local politics. He began to promote the extension of railroads into Cleveland. Along with a few associates, Payne founded the Cleveland and Columbus Railroad in 1851, and served as its president. He also invested in several other local railroads. He resigned the railroad presidency in 1854, but the following year became president of a different railroad, the Painesville and Ashtabula. That same year, Payne became one of Cleveland's first water works commissioners. He also invested in real estate, and in 1888 arranged for the construction of the Perry-Payne Building in the present-day Warehouse District.

=== Ohio politics ===
Payne entered local politics as a Democrat, serving as a Presidential elector in 1848 for Democratic nominees Lewis Cass and William Orlando Butler. He was elected to the Cleveland City Council in 1849, and served there until 1854. At the same time, he was a member of the Ohio Senate from 1849 to 1851. His skill as a parliamentarian led his party to nominate him for the United States Senate in 1851, but the election went to Whig candidate, Benjamin Wade, by a vote of 44–34. (Note: Before the passage of the Seventeenth Amendment to the United States Constitution in 1913, Senators were chosen by their states' legislatures.) Payne attended the 1856 Democratic National Convention, where he worked successfully for the nomination of James Buchanan. He ran for Governor of Ohio in 1857, but narrowly lost to the incumbent Republican, Salmon P. Chase. With more than 300,000 votes cast, Payne fell short of victory by just 1,503. In 1860, he again attended the Democrats' convention, where he helped nominate his old friend Stephen A. Douglas, and sided with Douglas's faction as the party divided into northern and southern halves.

At the 1860 convention, Payne denounced the right of secession, and during the Civil War that began the next year, he was a staunch supporter of the Union. Although he was not an abolitionist, he opposed the further extension of slavery. During the war, Payne used some of his wealth to help equip Ohio regiments. He was 50 years old when the war began, too old to volunteer himself, but two of his sons served in the Union Army with his blessing. After the war, Payne continued his political activity, leading the Ohio delegation to the 1872 Democratic National Convention, where he supported the eventual nominee, Horace Greeley. He campaigned on Greeley's behalf, raising his own political profile in the process. In 1874, Payne ran for a seat in the United States House of Representatives from Ohio's 20th district, and was elected with a 2500-vote majority over the incumbent Republican, Richard C. Parsons.

=== U.S. House of Representatives ===
When the 44th United States Congress assembled, the House was controlled by the Democrats for the first time since the Civil War. Payne was placed on the Banking and Currency Committee and the Committee for the Reform of Civil Service. At the time, the currency circulating in the United States was a mix of gold-backed dollars and "greenbacks" that were backed only by the credit of the United States, with the public considering greenbacks to be worth less than gold dollars. The previous Congress, controlled by Republicans, had passed the Specie Payment Resumption Act, which would return the United States to the gold standard by 1879. Opinion among Democrats was split, with Eastern Democrats supporting the Act, and Western and Southern members hoping for its repeal.

Payne drew up a compromise bill, in which the Resumption Act would be repealed and replaced with a gradual, partial return to gold-backed money. Under the Payne Act, national banks would be required to build up gold reserves equal to three percent of the value of greenbacks in circulation that year, adding an additional three percent each year until 1885, when they would have gold reserves of thirty percent of the value of circulating greenbacks. At that point, greenbacks would become redeemable in at least thirty percent gold. This compromise was still too much for the Eastern Democrats and Republicans who favored the gold standard, and the Banking Committee refused to approve the bill. Payne contrived to bypass his committee and bring the bill for a vote by the whole House, but it was voted down, 81 to 157. The House later passed a complete repeal of the Resumption Act, 133 to 120, but the Senate declined to take up the matter. Specie resumption remained the law of the land when the 44th Congress's term expired.

In the 1876 presidential election, Republican Rutherford B. Hayes of Ohio defeated Democrat Samuel J. Tilden of New York in one of the most hotly contested presidential elections to that time in the nation's history. The results initially indicated a Democratic victory, but the electoral votes of several states were ardently disputed until mere days before the new president was to be inaugurated. Members of both parties in Congress agreed to convene a bipartisan Electoral Commission, which ultimately decided the race for Hayes. Payne was named to the committee at Tilden's request, but the results went against the Democrats as Hayes was declared the winner of the disputed votes. After the Commissions result, Payne joined many Democrats in attempting to delay the House proceedings in hopes of forcing a more favorable result, but was outvoted by Republicans and the Democrats who sided with Speaker Samuel J. Randall in accepting the commission's result. The effort failed, and Hayes became president on March 4, 1877.

=== Presidential politics ===
Payne ran for reelection in 1876 but was defeated by Republican Amos Townsend. He remained involved in politics, however, and even considered running for the Democratic nomination for president in 1880. Tilden, while not officially a candidate, wielded a heavy influence over the convention. Tilden was ambiguous about his willingness to participate in another campaign, leading some delegates to defect to other candidates, while others stayed loyal to their old standard-bearer. Tilden did tell some of his close supporters that, if he did not run, Payne would be his first choice and House Speaker Samuel J. Randall his second. With that, many of the Tilden loyalists pledged their support to Payne, at least until Tilden decided to enter the race. Although Tilden ultimately declined to be nominated, Payne's chances were hindered when Ohio's delegation remained loyal to Senator Allen G. Thurman. Although Payne place third on the convention's first ballot, on the second the delegates stampeded to General Winfield Scott Hancock, who was nominated.

=== Election to the U.S. Senate ===
In 1884, the Democrats held a majority in the Ohio legislature. In a caucus meeting to determine the party's choice for United States Senator, many Democratic legislators looked to replace the incumbent Senator, Democrat George H. Pendleton, because they disagreed with his advocacy of civil service reform and low tariffs. Some of Pendleton's opponents, led by Oliver Payne, promoted Henry Payne for the Senate seat, recalling his opposition to both of those positions during his time in the House. After a secret ballot by the Democratic caucus, Payne received 46 out of 80 votes. Because Oliver was a trustee and treasurer of the Standard Oil company, many of the Pendleton supporters immediately alleged that $100,000 from the oil trust had been used to bribe Democratic legislators, and claimed that an open ballot would not have favored Payne.

When the full legislature met, Payne was elected with 78 votes out of 120. The Democratic legislature initially refused to investigate their members' alleged corruption, but when Republicans regained the majority in the next session, the legislature looked into the allegations and forwarded the results to the federal Senate. The evidence gathered was voluminous, but the Senate declined to expel Payne, who proclaimed his innocence. While there was never enough evidence for definitive proof of bribery, biographer Dewayne Burke wrote that the "circumstantial evidence seems to convict Payne" of the charge.

=== Tariffs and interstate commerce ===
In the Senate, the most prominent fight was over the need for a strong protective tariff, which made foreign goods more expensive but encouraged domestic manufacturing. Payne supported a high tariff, but thought some small reductions would be prudent in order to reduce the federal government's surplus. He joined fellow Senate Democrats in rejecting a tariff bill proposed by Iowa Republican William B. Allison, which would have raised the rates even higher than Payne thought prudent. His only contribution to the debate was to argue against a reduction in the tariff on steel and iron. This Allison bill passed the Republican-controlled Senate, but failed to pass in the House, which was controlled by Democrats.

At the same time, the regulation of interstate commerce, especially as concerned the railroads, was a political issue. The call for regulation of the railroads divided the nation's business interests, with railroads working against legislation and manufacturers, who were aggrieved by high railroad rates, joining the reformers. Standard Oil joined the latter group in calling for Congressional action. In 1886, Payne voted for a bill that would reform railroad rates slightly, but was considered ineffective by reformers. After amendments by the House, however, the bill returned to the Senate with more substantive prohibitions on the practices consumers and manufacturers found most egregious. Payne voted against the strengthened Interstate Commerce Act, which passed and was signed into law by President Grover Cleveland. In explaining his vote, Payne said that the law was impractical and unfairly advantaged other methods of shipping (such as boat transportation on the Great Lakes) over the railroads.

== Personal life ==
In 1836, Payne married Mary Perry (1818–1895), the only child of Nathan Perry Jr., a wealthy local merchant who was the son of Nathan Perry, known as "Major," and Sophia Leonora (née Root) Perry, and his wife, Paulina (née Skinner) Perry, a daughter of Abraham Skinner and Mary (née Ayers) Skinner. Together, they were the parents of six children:

- Nathan P. Payne (1837–1885), who became the mayor of Cleveland.
- Oliver Hazard Payne (1839–1917), a Gilded Age businessman.
- Flora Payne (1842–1893), who married Secretary of the Navy William Collins Whitney.
- Henry Wilson Payne (1845–1878), who graduated from Columbia Law School in May 1870; died in poor health.
- Elisha Howard Payne (1851–1852), who died young.
- Mary Perry Payne (1854–1898), who married Charles William Bingham (1846–1929).

Payne died in Cleveland on September 9, 1896, at the age of eighty-five. He is interred in Lake View Cemetery in Cleveland. His descendants continued to be involved in Ohio politics. In addition to his sons Oliver and Nathan, his son-in-law was Secretary of the Navy William Collins Whitney of the politically prominent Whitney family. Payne was the maternal grandfather of Frances P. Bolton and great-grandfather of Oliver Payne Bolton, both of whom later served in the United States House of Representatives. The village of Payne, Ohio was named in his honor. He was also the great-grandfather of Michael Whitney Straight, a confessed spy for the KGB.

== Sources ==
- "Henry B. Payne Dead" (PDF). The New York Times. September 10, 1896.
- Memorial Record of the County of Cuyahoga and City of Cleveland, Ohio. Chicago, Illinois: Lewis Publishing Company. 1894. OCLC 1870617.
- Burke, Dewayne (1938). Henry B. Payne: His Congressional Career (M.A. thesis). Ohio State University. Archived from the original on August 26, 2016.
- Clancy, Herbert J. (1958). The Presidential Election of 1880. Chicago, Illinois: Loyola University Press. ISBN 978-1-258-19190-0.
- Gregor, Sharon E. (2010). Rockefeller's Cleveland. Charleston, South Carolina: Arcadia Publishing. ISBN 978-0-7385-7711-1.
- Hoogenboom, Ari (1995). Rutherford Hayes: Warrior and President. Lawrence, Kansas: University Press of Kansas. ISBN 978-0-7006-0641-2.
- Nash, Gerald D. (July 1957). "Origins of the Interstate Commerce Act of 1887". Pennsylvania History. 24 (3): 181–190. JSTOR 27769741.
- Reed, George Irving; Randall, Emilius Oviatt; Greve, Charles Theodore, eds. (1897). Bench and Bar of Ohio: a Compendium of History and Biography. Vol. 2. Chicago, Illinois: Century Publishing and Engraving Company. pp. 96–100.
- Walker, Albert H. (1886). The Payne Bribery Case and the United States Senate. Hartford, Connecticut: Clark & Smith. OCLC 17693469.
- Weisenburger, Francis Phelps (1934). "Henry B. Payne". Dictionary of American Biography. Vol. XIV. New York, New York: C. Scribner's Sons. pp. 325–326.

U.S. House of Representatives
Preceded by Richard C. Parsons	Member of the U.S. House of Representatives from Ohio's 20th congressional district 1875–1877	Succeeded by Amos Townsend
U.S. Senate
Preceded by George H. Pendleton	U.S. senator (Class 3) from Ohio; 1885–1891; Served alongside: John Sherman	Succeeded by Calvin S. Brice
Party political offices
Preceded by William Medill	Democratic Party nominee for Governor of Ohio; 1857	Succeeded by Rufus P. Ranney
Ohio Senate
Preceded by Franklin T. Backus	Senator from Cuyahoga County; December 3, 1849 – January 5, 1852	Succeeded by Harvey Rice
