= Charles A. Otis =

American politician

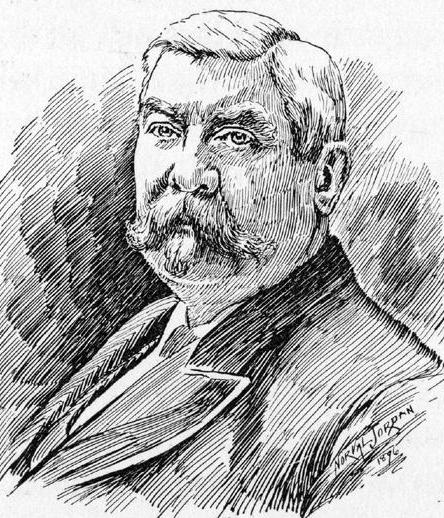
- Charles Augustus Otis by Norval Jordan, 1896

23rd Mayor of Cleveland
- In office 1873–1874
- Preceded by: Frederick W. Pelton
- Succeeded by: Nathan P. Payne

Personal details
- Born: January 30, 1827 Bloomfield Township, Ohio
- Died: June 28, 1905 (aged 78) Cleveland, Ohio
- Resting place: Lake View Cemetery
- Party: Democratic
- Spouse: Mary Shepard
- Children: five

Charles Augustus Otis, Sr. (January 30, 1827 – June 28, 1905) was a businessman and the mayor of Cleveland from 1873 until 1874.

== Early life ==
Otis was born in Bloomfield Township, Ohio, to William Augustus Otis and Eliza Proctor. Otis was a direct descendant of James Otis Jr. William was a Massachusetts-born manufacturer who worked in Pittsburgh before traveled to Bloomfield, Trumbull County, Ohio, to start a primitive mercantile business and a tavern. In 1836, William moved to Cleveland to return to ironworks. Charles would follow his father in this line of work. William became a steamboat purser in 1848. Otis shipped wheat from Ohio to Buffalo, New York en route the Erie Canal. He manufactured high-quality flour and potash thirty-five miles to Ashtabula River, where it was loaded on a schooner and shipped to Buffalo and New York City.

== Career ==
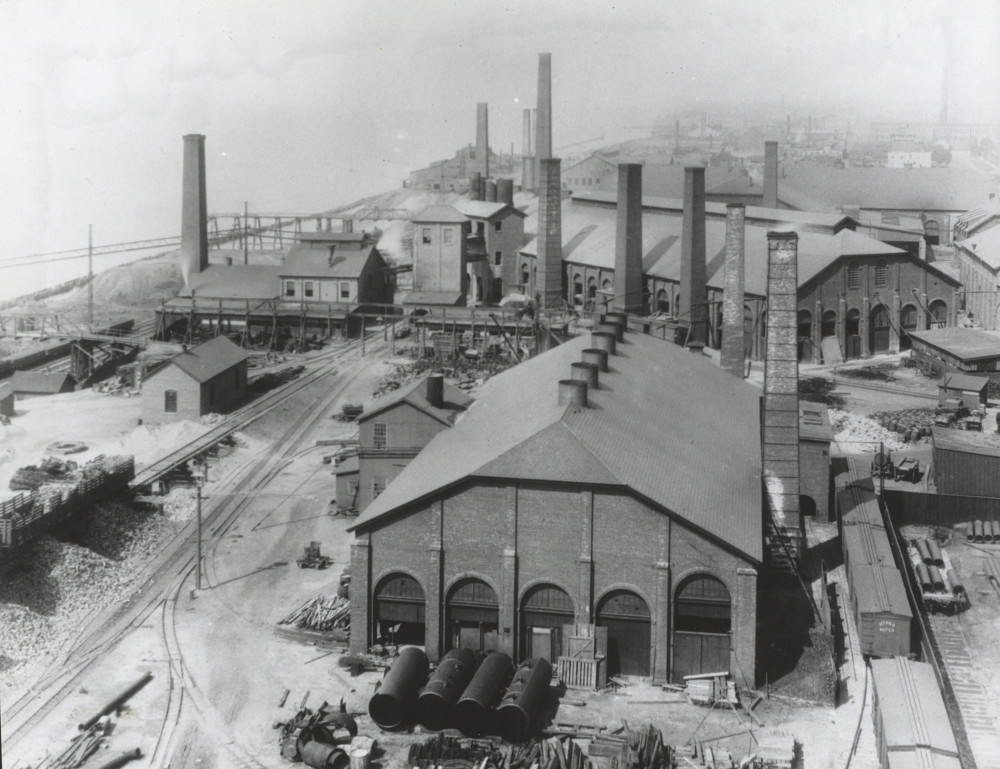
Otis Iron and Steel Company, ca. 1910

Otis established the Lake Erie Iron Company in 1852. He sold the business in 1866 when he decided to study ironworks in Prussia. The Otis Iron and Steel Company was established upon Otis' return in Industrial Valley. It was the first American company to solely manufacture acid open-hearth steel. Otis later founded American Wire Company, which became the American Steel and Wire Company, and was connected with the Standard Sewing Machine Company. He also founded the American Steel Screw Company, the Cleveland Electric Railway Company, and the Society for Savings. Otis worked with Dr. Everett and Samuel T. Wellman in the old East Cleveland line. It was said that Otis took a personal interest in his employees.

== Politics ==
Otis was both a prominent industrial developer and municipal leader of Cleveland. The Democrats nominated him in his absence and without his knowledge, as their candidate for mayor by 1872. He defeated Standard Oil founder and Republican candidate, John Huntington. It was said that Otis' lack of consent for the nomination allowed him to show respectable individuality in his political career.

On October 17, 1873, Ulysses S. Grant passed through the city. Gossip and a telegram reached Otis, who hitched a car on an engine; a reception committee, including the mayor, drove to Elyria within thirty-eight minutes. Grant's presidential train arrived to a city decorated with American flags. The group drove down Euclid Avenue to meet the President at Kennard House.

In February, 1874, Otis visited Indianapolis, Indiana. Much like Cleveland, Indianapolis saw its growth in the last decades of the nineteenth-century. Otis toured the city for less than a month to see much of the early growth. Charles' brother, William H. Otis, was a prominent resident of Indianapolis.

On March 19, 1874, forty members of the Women's Christian Temperance Union (WTC) marched on Ontario Street, Public Square, and YMCA. Assaults were made against the women in the eleventh ward on Lorain Avenue. The WTC returned to their protest on Garden Street on the following day. Mayor Otis ordered a sidewalk ordinance.

Mayor Otis argued that the few who could afford to use the Cleveland Water Works "should aid in extending" the service to the rest of the city. Written on page xxi of the City Documents of 1874, Otis advocated a 33.3% increase in the cost of public waterworks, to fund construction.

Otis left as mayor in the following year due to business reasons. His political career was described as very successful. His party gave him the nomination, but found that his business was too successful. The work took much of his attention, so he declined to seek reelection. Otis had a strong wish to serve the people. Otis became a member of the Board of Imprisonments in 1878. He served for one year. Otis became a member of the House of Correction Board in 1882 until 1884. He established Cleveland's first Board of Fire Commissioners and Board of Police Commissioners.

== Personal life ==
Otis married Mary Shepard in 1853. The couple had two daughters, Anna and Nelly. Mary died in 1860. Otis married Mary's sister, Anna Elizabeth Shepard in 1863. They had 3 sons, Charles A. (a financier who owned the Cleveland News and other Cleveland newspapers), Jr., Harrison G., and William A.

== Later life ==
He moved to New York in 1890, where he stayed until his death. Otis was a member of the Ohio Society of New York. In 1894, he became president of New Commercial National Bank.

He retired from Otis Iron and Steel Company in 1899. By 1901, the Otis Iron and Steel Company merged with the Cleveland Rolling Mill Company into US Steel. The Jones and Laughlin Steel Company bought the former Otis Steel company along the Cuyahoga River in Cleveland was purchased in 1942. Otis retired from the New Commercial National Bank in 1904. Commercial Bank merged with the Mercantile National Bank, forming the present National Commercial Bank. His retirement left him unnoticed by the public in the 20th-Century. Otis spent his last years as an avid tourist of Europe.

== Death ==
Otis died at his son's house in 1905, in which his obituary stated that Cleveland lost one of the builders. Otis was described as a pioneer in the creative industrial enterprises which made the possibility of modern Cleveland. He was described as "one of the most active forces in the growth of Cleveland." Otis is buried in Lake View Cemetery.

Political offices
| Preceded by Frederick W. Pelton | Mayor of Cleveland; 1873–1874 | Succeeded by Nathan P. Payne |
