= Frederick W. Pelton =

American politician

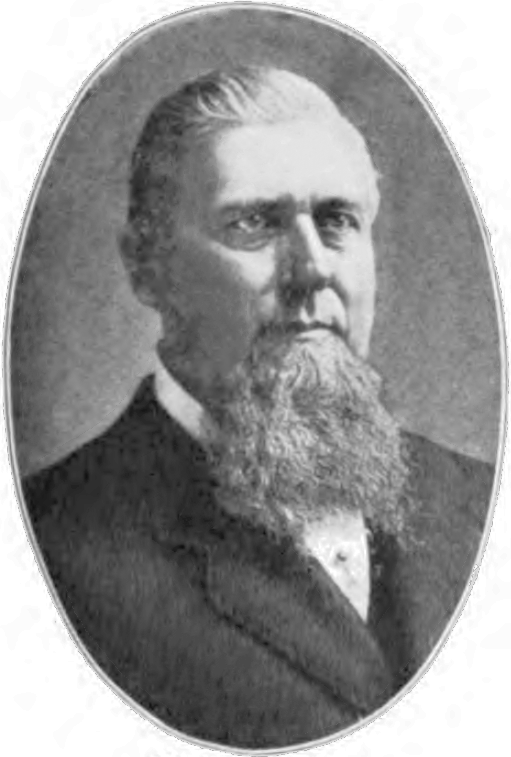

22nd Mayor of Cleveland
- In office 1871–1872
- Preceded by: Stephen Buhrer
- Succeeded by: Charles A. Otis

Personal details
- Born: March 24, 1827 Chester, Connecticut
- Died: March 15, 1902 (aged 74) Cleveland, Ohio
- Party: Republican
- Spouse: Susan Dennison
- Children: Seven

Frederick W. Pelton (March 24, 1827 – March 15, 1902) was mayor of Cleveland, Ohio from 1871 to 1872. He was a Republican, and served in the Union Army during the American Civil War.

== Life and career ==
Pelton was born in Chester, Connecticut. His father moved the family to Brooklyn, Cuyahoga County, Ohio in 1825, where Frederick grew up. He married Susan Dennison, who grew up on the adjoining farm, on August 23, 1848.

At age 16, Pelton completed his education, and entered the office of Wheeler, Chamberlain & Company in Akron, where he remained for five years, before moving to Cleveland. In 1858 he entered the ship chandler business. During the American Civil War, he was a captain of the 8th Ohio Independent Battery.

From 1863, until his election as Cleveland mayor in 1871, Pelton was secretary of an insurance company, he was a member of city council, serving as president, and was treasurer of Cuyahoga County for two terms after being mayor.

Pelton was a founder of the Citizens' Saving & Loan Association, and a director until his death. He was president from 1893 until his death. He was also a director of several other S&Ls. He was a founder and director of the Riverside Cemetery Association.

Pelton was a thirty-third degree Mason, Odd Fellow, Knights of Pythias, the Methodist Episcopal Church, and member of the Grand Army of the Republic.

Pelton and his wife had seven children, two of whom survived him. he died at his Prospect Street home.

Political offices
Preceded by Stephen Buhrer	Mayor of Cleveland; 1871–1872	Succeeded by Charles A. Otis
