= Pamela Talkin =

Marshal of the Supreme Court of the United States

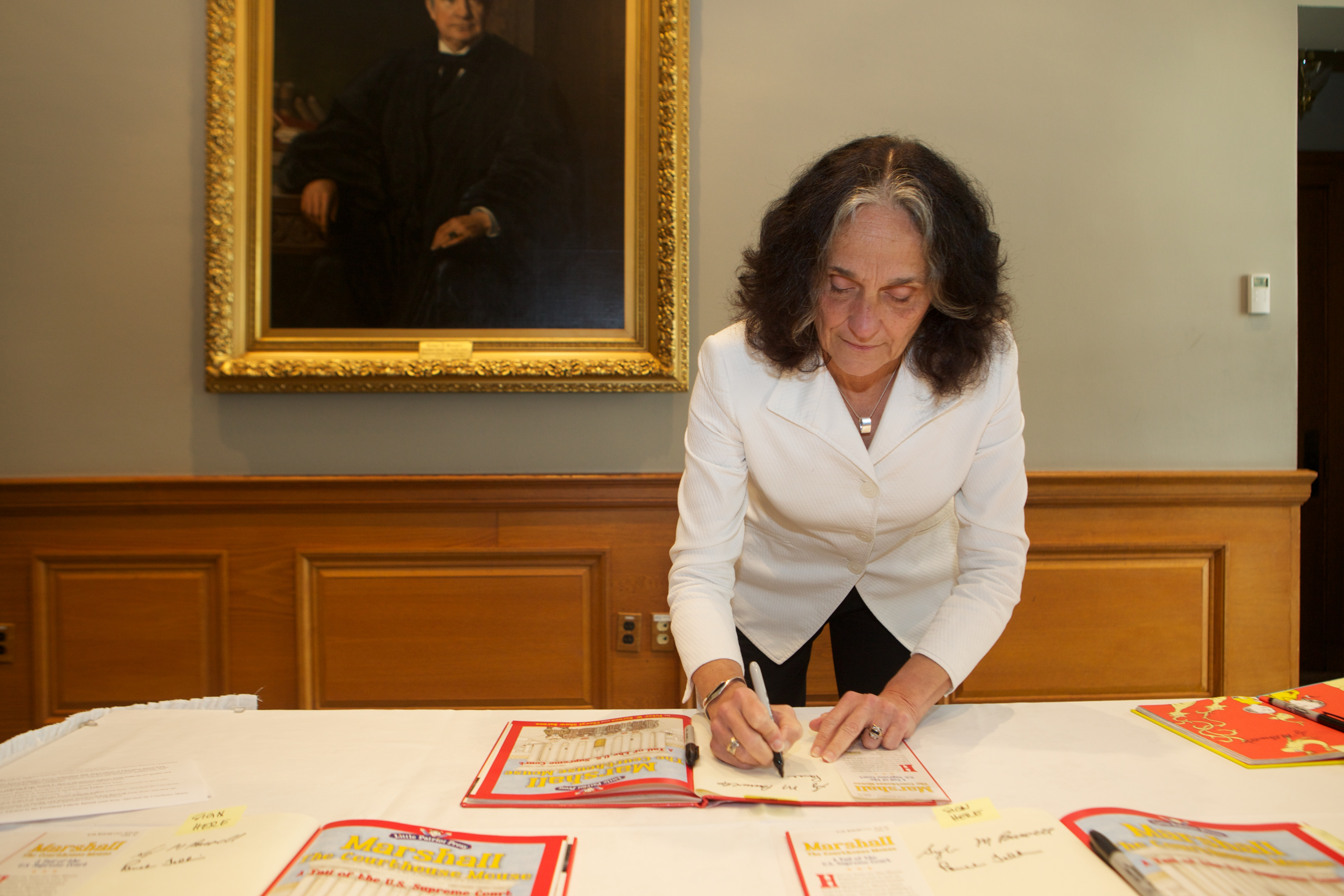

10th Marshal of the United States Supreme Court
- In office July 16, 2001 – July 31, 2020
- Preceded by: Dale Bosley
- Succeeded by: Gail Curley

Personal details
- Born: 1947 (age 78–79)
- Party: Democratic
- Education: Brooklyn College (BA, MA)

Pamela T. Talkin (born 1947) is a former marshal of the United States Supreme Court and the first woman to hold this position.

== Early life and education ==
Talkin earned her bachelor's and master's degrees in Spanish from the City University of New York at Brooklyn College. She has done postgraduate work at the City University of New York and at Harvard University's John F. Kennedy School of Government.

== Career ==
Talkin began her career as a Spanish teacher and guidance counselor in New York City high schools. From 1984 to 1985, she was special assistant to the commissioner of the Equal Employment Opportunity Commission. From 1986 to 1989, she was chief of staff to the EEOC Chair, Clarence Thomas, even while being a Democrat. In 1991, she testified in support of Clarence Thomas during his confirmation hearings in response to allegations of sexual harassment by Anita Hill.

From 1984 to 1986, Talkin was an assistant regional director of the National Labor Relations Board in San Francisco, California, and from 1986 to 1989, she was chief of staff at the United States Equal Employment Opportunity Commission. In 1989, Talkin was appointed by President George H. W. Bush and confirmed by the Senate as a member of the Federal Labor Relations Authority. From 1995 to 2001, she was the first deputy executive director of the Office of Compliance, the independent regulatory agency created by the Congressional Accountability Act of 1995, which applies the nation’s labor and employment laws to Congress.

In July 2001 Talkin became Marshal of the United States Supreme Court, in which capacity she oversaw the security, operations and management of the Supreme Court building. One of her responsibilities was to open all sessions of the Court with the traditional cry, "Oyez! Oyez! Oyez!"

On July 7, 2020, the Court announced that Talkin would retire as Marshal effective July 31, 2020, after 19 years as Marshal and 47 total years of federal employment. She was succeeded by Gail Curley.
