= Martha Parmelee Rose =

American journalist and social reformer (1834–1923)

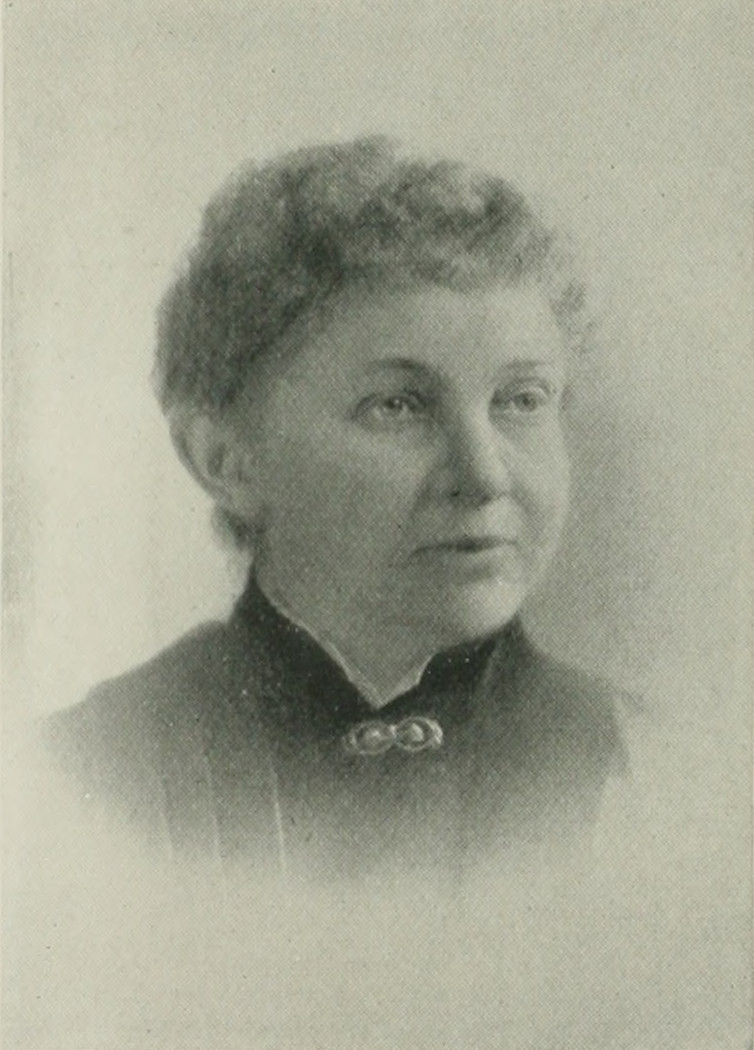
- Portrait from "A Woman of the Century"
- Born: Martha Emily Parmelee; March 5, 1834; Norton, Ohio, U.S.
- Died: May 5, 1923 (aged 89); Cleveland, Ohio
- Education: Oberlin College
- Occupations: Journalist; writer; social reformer/leader; philanthropist
- Spouse: William G. Rose (m. 1858; died 1899)
- Children: 4
- Writing career
- Pen name: Mrs. W. G. Rose; Mrs. Wm. G. Rose; Charles C. Lee
- Notable works: The Western Reserve of Ohio and some of its pioneers, places and women's clubs

Signature
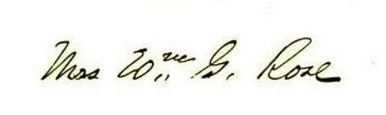

Martha Parmelee Rose (née, Parmelee; pen name, Mrs. W. G. Rose and Charles C. Lee; March 5, 1834 – May 5, 1923) was an American journalist, social reformer, social leader, and philanthropist. Interested in the poor and destitute, especially the sufferings of sewing women, Rose succeeded in arousing attention for the establishment of a training school in Cleveland, Ohio. In addition to writing articles on the labor question and similar topics, she published several books. Rose was a social leader and a patron of art.

== Early life and education ==
Martha Emily Parmalee was born in Norton, Ohio, March 5, 1834. Her parents were Theodore Hudson Parmelee and Harriet (née Holcomb) Parmelee.

She was a granddaughter of Captain Theodore Parmelee, of Litchfield, Connecticut, whose service in the American Revolutionary War was rewarded by a grant of land. In 1811, Theodore H. Parmelee removed from New England to Ohio with his uncle, David Hudson, who founded the Western Reserve College, of Hudson, Ohio, now Adelbert Hall. In 1813, Theodore Hudson Parmelee went to Ohio with this colony. Educated under Lyman Beecher, he was too liberal to be an adherent of Calvin, and he accepted the views of Oberlin, which opened its college doors to African Americans and to woman. Martha grew up in Tallmadge, Ohio.

Following her husband's death, the widow removed to Oberlin, Ohio, taking up residence in 1847. Martha, the youngest of the children, from twelve years of age to adulthood heard the sermons of Charles G. Finney.

She attended the Women's Seminary in Mercer, Pennsylvania, and graduated from Oberlin College in 1855.

== Career ==
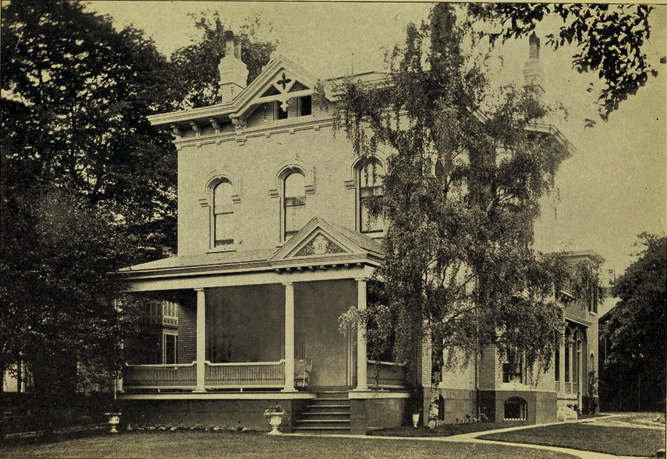
The Rose residence in Cleveland.

Following her graduation, she engaged in teaching music in the seminary at Mercer, Pennsylvania, and it was there that she became acquainted with William G. Rose, a member of the Pennsylvania General Assembly, an editor and lawyer. They were married on March 28, 1858, and in Cleveland they reared their family of four children.

In the oil development of 1864, he acquired competency and removed to Cleveland, Ohio. Mrs. Rose, interested in the benevolent work of Cleveland, found that those who asked for aid often worked for wealthy firms, whose business was suspended in the winter, and that such idleness was the cause of pauperism and crime. During her husband's first term as mayor of Cleveland, she investigated the reports of destitution among the Bohemians of her own city. She made it one object of her life to see for herself the sufferings of sewing women, and brought to light the frauds and extortion practiced upon them.

She founded the Women's Employment Society, which gave work to needy women who could sew, put garments in stores in exchange for more goods, and had private sales. She also obtained government work from the Bureau of Indian Affairs, receiving US$800 for furnishing shirts and trousers for that department.

A lecture by the sculptor, McDonald, of New York, gave an account of the manual training schools of France and Sweden. Mrs. Rose reviewed the report of the Royal Commission of England for the daily press and sent copies of it to businessmen. Other lectures followed, and a manual training-school was established in Cleveland.

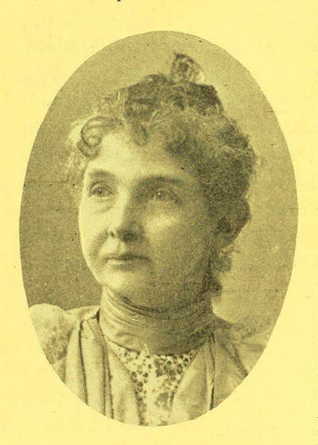
(c. 1898)

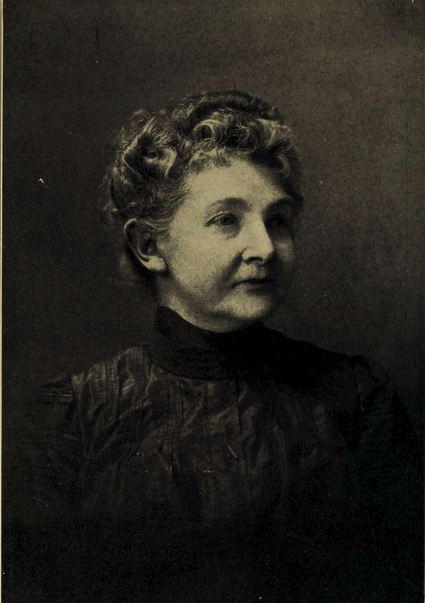
(c. 1914)

A book, The Story of a Life; or Pauperism in America, was not published. Rose wrote up the trade schools of France, under the name of "Charles C. Lee", for the daily papers and in that way aided and established the manual training schools of Cleveland, a valued department of high-school work. In many ways, she created public sympathy and interest in movements that have been most valuable in promoting benevolent work. She also wrote on similar topics, and reported numerous lectures and sermons on those subjects. She reviewed Annie Field's How to Help the Poor, and some of its suggestions were used by the Associated Charities of Cleveland.

She was a charter member of the Daughters of the American Revolution (D.A.R.) in Cleveland. In 1881, Rose was made president of the Cleveland Sorosis, which in three years, the term of her office, increased its membership to 269. Rose attended the General Federation of Women's Clubs at Los Angeles, California, as a delegate from Chautauqua, New York. She there met Mrs. Herman Hall, whom she invited to come to Cleveland and aid in forming a civics club. She was made the chair of playgrounds and through her instrumentality, three were located, the first in Cleveland Heights, Ohio. Once a year, the children visited the fresh air camp, Bostwick animal show, or Euclid beach; 45 children were enrolled at that playground. For three years, these children met in Rose's rooms to make raffia work, burnt wood, and garments. She gave rooms for a mission for a purity league and for a boys' club.

Rose founded the Health Protective Association in 1898. She served as president of the Cleveland Health Protective Association, treasurer of the National Health Protective League, and president of the International Health Protective Association. In 1910, Rose appealed to the General Federation of Women's Clubs to abolish the wearing of corsets as a vital step in securing the physical and moral well-being of women.

She was a patron of art.

Martha Parmelee Rose died at her home in Cleveland, May 5, 1923, after an illness of three weeks.

== Selected works ==
- Album of the Western Reserve Centennial, 1896 (text)
- Travels in Europe and Northern Africa : a woman's view, 1901 (text)
- The American boy and letters to his mother, 1912 (text)
- The Western Reserve of Ohio and some of its pioneers, places and women's clubs, 1914
  - Volume 1 (text)
  - Volume 2 (text)
- Reminiscences or Character Building
Album of the Western Reserve centennial (1896)

Travels in Europe and Northern Africa. A woman's view (1901)

The American boy and letters to his mother (1912)
