= Marshal of the United States Supreme Court =

Statutory head of the United States Supreme Court Police

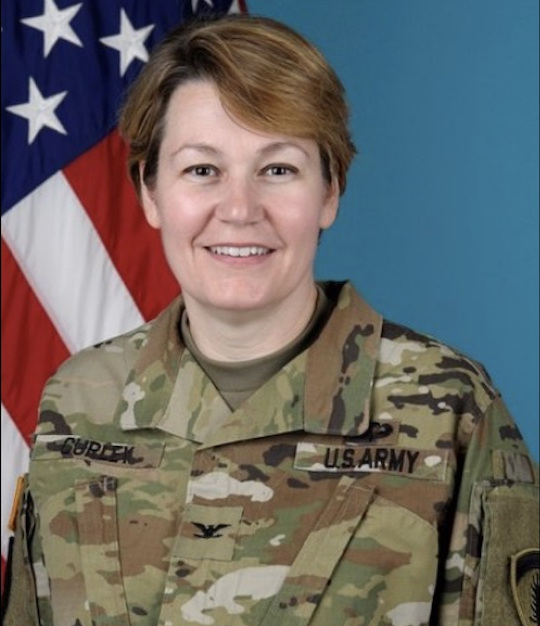
- Incumbent; Gail Anne Curley since June 21, 2021
- United States Supreme Court Police
- Style: Marshal
- Status: Chief of Police
- Reports to: Supreme Court of the United States
- Seat: Supreme Court Building, Washington, D.C.
- Appointer: The Supreme Court
- Constituting instrument: 28 U.S.C. § 672
- Formation: 1867
- First holder: Richard C. Parsons

The marshal of the United States Supreme Court heads the United States Supreme Court Police, a security police service answerable to the court itself rather than to the president or attorney general. They handle security for the Supreme Court building and for the justices personally.

== Legal basis ==
In accordance with 28 U.S.C. § 672:

(a) The Supreme Court may appoint a marshal, who shall be subject to removal by the Court, and may fix his compensation.

(b) The marshal may, with the approval of the Chief Justice of the United States, appoint and fix the compensation of necessary assistants and other employees to attend the Court, and necessary custodial employees.

(c) The marshal shall:

(1) Attend the Court at its sessions;
(2) Serve and execute all process and orders issued by the Court or a member thereof;
(3) Take charge of all property of the United States used by the Court or its members;
(4) Disburse funds appropriated for work upon the Supreme Court building and grounds under the jurisdiction of the Architect of the Capitol upon certified vouchers submitted by the Architect;
(5) Disburse funds appropriated for the purchase of books, pamphlets, periodicals and other publications, and for their repair, binding, and rebinding, upon vouchers certified by the librarian of the Court;
(6) Pay the salaries of the Chief Justice, associate justices, and all officers and employees of the Court and disburse other funds appropriated for disbursement, under the direction of the Chief Justice;
(7) Pay the expenses of printing briefs and travel expenses of attorneys in behalf of persons whose motions to appear in forma pauperis in the Supreme Court have been approved and when counsel have been appointed by the Supreme Court, upon vouchers certified by the clerk of the Court;
(8) Oversee the Supreme Court Police.

To carry out these duties, 40 U.S.C. § 6121 authorizes the marshal to police the Supreme Court building and protect the justices, employees of the Court, and visitors to the Court. The marshal also has authority to make arrests in carrying out these duties.

At the beginning of each session of the Court, the 10 a.m. entrance of the justices into the courtroom is announced by the marshal. Those present, at the sound of the gavel, arise and remain standing until the robed justices are seated following the traditional chant: "The Honorable, the Chief Justice and the Associate Justices of the Supreme Court of the United States. Oyez! Oyez! Oyez! All persons having business before the Honorable, the Supreme Court of the United States, are admonished to draw near and give their attention, for the Court is now sitting. God save the United States and this Honorable Court!"

== List of Marshals ==
The office of Marshal was created by statute in 1867. The Marshals since that date have been:

  1. Richard C. Parsons (1867–1872)
  2. John G. Nicolay (1872–1887)
  3. John M. Wright (1888–1915)
  4. Frank Key Green (1915–1938)
  5. Thomas E. Waggaman (1938–1952)
  6. T. Perry Lippitt (1952–1972)
  7. Frank M. Hepler (1972–1976)
  8. Alfred M. Wong (1976–1994)
  9. Dale E. Bosley (1994–2001)
  10. Pamela Talkin (2001–2020)
  11. Gail A. Curley (2021–present)

On July 7, 2020, the Court announced that Marshal Talkin would retire effective July 31, 2020, after 19 years as the marshal and 47 total years of federal employment. Her successor, Gail A. Curley, was announced on May 3, 2021, and assumed her duties on June 21, 2021.

== See also ==
- United States Supreme Court Police – The federal law enforcement body led by the Marshal of the United States Supreme Court.
- United States Marshals Service – The United States Marshals Service also executes all lawful writs, processes, and orders issued under the authority of the United States, and shall command all necessary assistance to execute its duties.
