= Richard C. Parsons =

American politician (1826–1899)

Richard Chappel Parsons
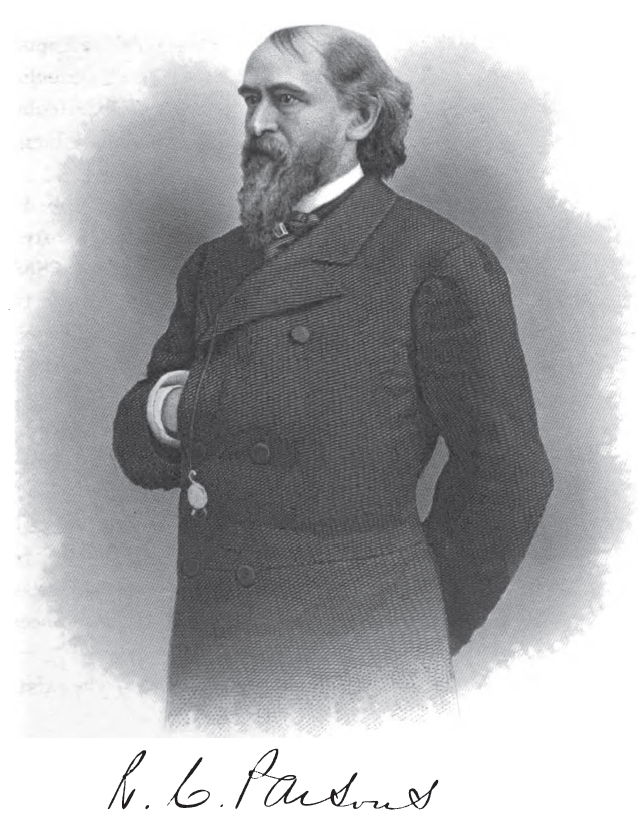

Member of the U.S. House of Representatives from Ohio's 20th district
- In office March 4, 1873 – March 3, 1875
- Preceded by: John Hutchins
- Succeeded by: Henry B. Payne

1st Marshal of the United States Supreme Court
- In office 1867–1872
- Preceded by: Office established
- Succeeded by: John G. Nicolay

47th Speaker of the Ohio House
- In office January 2, 1860 – January 5, 1862
- Preceded by: William Burnham Woods
- Succeeded by: James Randolph Hubbell

Member of the Ohio House of Representatives
- In office 1858-1861

Personal details
- Born: October 10, 1826 New London, Connecticut, U.S.
- Died: January 9, 1899 (aged 72) Cleveland, Ohio, U.S.
- Resting place: Lake View Cemetery
- Party: Republican

Richard Chappel Parsons (October 10, 1826 – January 9, 1899) was an American lawyer and politician who served as a U.S. representative from Ohio for one term from 1873 to 1875.

== Early life and career ==
Born in New London, Connecticut, Parsons pursued classical studies, and moved to Norwalk, Ohio, in 1845. He studied law, and was admitted to the bar in 1851 and commenced practice at Cleveland, Ohio. He was the law partner of Rufus P. Spalding, a prominent Ohio politician and jurist who would himself serve three terms in the U.S. House of Representatives.

Parsons was the son-in-law of Samuel Starkweather, who served non-consecutive terms as the mayor of Cleveland in the mid-1800s.

== Early political career ==
He served as member of the city council in 1852 and 1853 and served as president in 1853. He served as member of the State house of representatives 1858-1861 and served one term as speaker. He was appointed consul to Rio de Janeiro, Brazil, on March 27, 1862, but resigned, effective October 1, 1862.

He served as collector of internal revenue at Cleveland 1862–1866. President Andrew Johnson offered Parsons the offices of Governor of Montana Territory and Assistant Secretary of the Treasury. He declined both, instead serving as the first marshal of the United States Supreme Court from 1867 to 1872.

== Congress ==
Parsons was elected as a Republican to the Forty-third Congress (March 4, 1873 – March 3, 1875). He was an unsuccessful Republican candidate for reelection to the Forty-fourth Congress.

== Later career ==
He resumed the practice of law in Cleveland, Ohio. He was editor and part owner with William Perry Fogg of the Cleveland Daily Herald in 1877.

== Death ==
He died in Cleveland, Ohio, January 9, 1899. He was interred in Lake View Cemetery.

== Sources ==
- United States Congress. "Richard C. Parsons (id: P000089)". Biographical Directory of the United States Congress.

U.S. House of Representatives
Preceded by District re-established	Member of the U.S. House of Representatives from Ohio's 20th congressional district 1873–1875	Succeeded by Henry B. Payne
