= Gail Curley =

Marshal of the U.S. Supreme Court since 2021

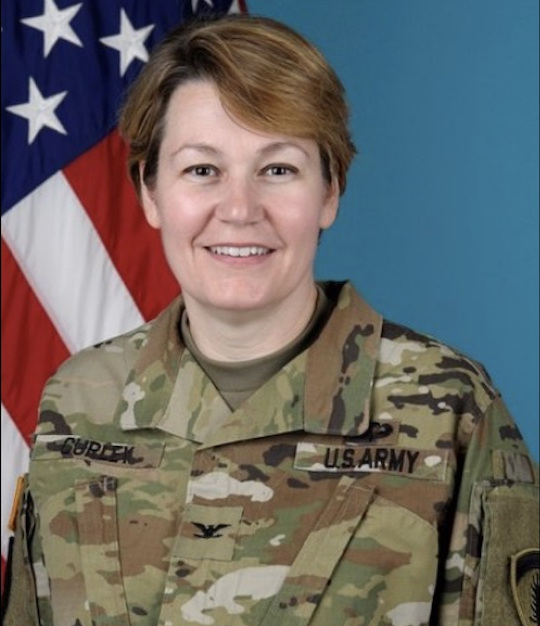
- Official portrait, 2021

11th Marshal of the United States Supreme Court
- Incumbent
- Assumed office June 21, 2021
- Preceded by: Pamela Talkin

Personal details
- Born: February 23, 1969 (age 57) California, U.S.
- Education: United States Military Academy (BS); University of Illinois, Urbana-Champaign (JD); Judge Advocate General's Legal Center and School (LLM); National Defense University (MS)

Military service
- Branch/service: United States Army
- Years of service: 1991–2021
- Rank: Colonel

Gail Anne Curley (born February 23, 1969) is the 11th marshal of the United States Supreme Court, serving since June 21, 2021. Before beginning her term as Marshal, she served as a staff judge advocate (attorney) in the United States Army.

== Education ==
Born in California, Curley attended the United States Military Academy and earned a bachelor's degree in political science in 1991. She later attended the University of Illinois College of Law, graduating with a J.D. degree in 1999. Curley subsequently earned an LLM degree from The Judge Advocate General's Legal Center and School in 2004 and an MS degree from the Dwight D. Eisenhower School for National Security and Resource Strategy of the National Defense University in 2014.

== Army career ==
After graduating from West Point, Curley joined the Signal Corps. The Associated Press reported that in 2017 she said, "As a young Army signal officer I was able to lead a large platoon in Europe during my first assignment ... that was at a time when women were not allowed to serve as platoon leaders in certain jobs."

She later became the chief legal adviser to the U.S. Army Europe commander, where she oversaw 300 legal officials in Europe.

== Marshal of the United States Supreme Court ==
Curley began serving as the marshal of the United States Supreme Court on June 21, 2021. She is the second woman to hold the position, succeeding the first woman to do so, Pamela Talkin. As Marshal, Curley opens each Supreme Court session with an Oyez! Oyez! Oyez! call. When announcing her appointment, the Court described her responsibilities as being the Court's "chief security officer, facilities administrator, and contracting executive, managing approximately 260 employees, including the Supreme Court Police Force."

Following the leak of a draft opinion in Dobbs v. Jackson Women's Health Organization in May 2022, Chief Justice John Roberts directed Curley to conduct an investigation "into the source of the leak".

In July 2022, Curley sent letters to Maryland governor Larry Hogan and Virginia governor Glenn Youngkin asking them to enforce laws that prohibit protests and pickets outside of the private homes of justices. On January 19, 2023, Curley released an official report on the leak of Dobbs.
