= David R. Paige =

American politician

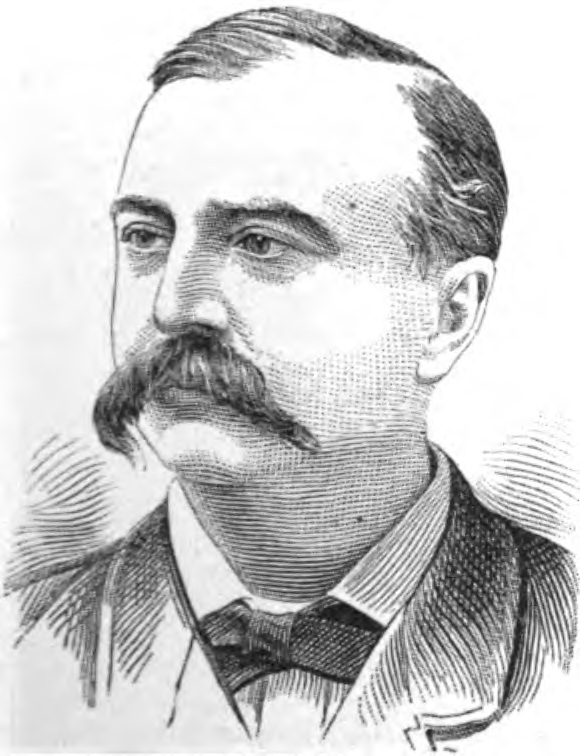

Member of the U.S. House of Representatives from Ohio's 20th district
- In office March 4, 1883 – March 3, 1885
- Preceded by: Amos Townsend
- Succeeded by: William McKinley

Personal details
- Born: David Raymond Paige; April 8, 1844 Madison, Ohio, U.S.
- Died: June 30, 1901 (aged 57) New York City, U.S.
- Resting place: Eevergreen Cemetery, Painesville, Ohio
- Party: Democratic
- Spouse(s): Ellen Lewis King; Eva Bell Leek
- Children: two
- Education: Union College

David Raymond Paige (April 8, 1844 – June 30, 1901) was an American politician who served one term as a U.S. representative from Ohio from 1883 to 1885.

== Biography ==
Born in Madison, Ohio, Paige attended the public schools, Madison Seminary (between 1857 and 1860) and Western Reserve Academy, Hudson, Ohio. He was graduated from Union College, Schenectady, New York, in 1865.

=== Early career ===
He engaged in the hardware business in Akron, Ohio and was Treasurer of Summit County from 1875 to 1879.

=== Congress ===
Paige was elected as a Democrat to the Forty-eighth Congress (March 4, 1883 – March 3, 1885). He engaged in the contracting business.

=== Bank scandal ===
In 1871, the Painesville Savings and Loan was created with Paige family members being founding members. A special meeting was called in 1892, when the savings and loans books did not balance and more than 500 persons with interest in the Savings and Loan, many of whom had deposits. The meeting was moved to a larger venue. David's brother Ralph traveled to New York to talk to David about the forged documents before returning to the Cleveland area. The forgery was found on documents pertaining to David's brother in law Huntington, who at the time was overseas in Europe.

As the news worsened, David fled the country for Argentina, where he lived for several years while trying to pay off his debts on the forged notes. With the help of friends in New York, he was able to repay most of the debt by 1899 and returned to New York to live, where he continued to pay on the remaining debt. The fall out from the forgery closed down the Painesville Savings and Loan and also around 30 people who worked for Paige Manufacturing went without pay and had to find new jobs in the weeks following the collapse.

=== Death and burial ===
Paige died in New York City on June 30, 1901. He was interred in Evergreen Cemetery, Painesville, Ohio.

=== Private life ===
Paige was married to Ellen Lewis King of Akron, January 19, 1870. She died December 20, 1877, leaving two sons. He remarried December 22, 1884 to Eva Bell Leek of Cleveland, Ohio.

== Sources ==
- United States Congress. "David R. Paige (id: P000025)". Biographical Directory of the United States Congress.

U.S. House of Representatives
Preceded by Amos Townsend	Member of the U.S. House of Representatives from Ohio's 20th congressional district 1883-1885	Succeeded by William McKinley
