= William G. Rose =

American politician

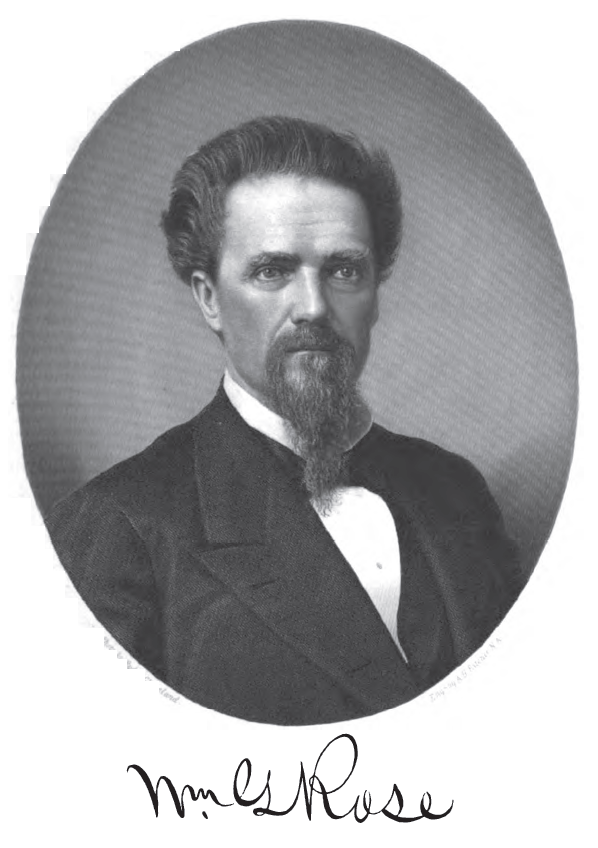

William G. Rose (September 23, 1829 – September 15, 1899) was a Republican mayor of Cleveland, Ohio, United States in the nineteenth century.

Rose was born at Mercer County, Pennsylvania, one of eleven children of James and Martha Rose. He grew up on a farm and attended local schools. He began as a school teacher at age 17, and studied law at a local law office starting at age 23. He was admitted to the bar in 1855, and began legal practice in Mercer in 1855.

Rose was associate editor on the Independent Democrat, the leading newspaper in Mercer County. He was a Republican member of the Pennsylvania legislature 1857–1859. Rose was chosen a delegate to the 1860 Republican National Convention which nominated Mr. Lincoln, but was unable to attend due to illness.

In 1865, Rose moved to Cleveland, Ohio, where he received the Republican nomination for mayor in 1877, and was elected by a large majority.

His wife was the journalist Martha Parmelee Rose. He was the 1st cousin, 2x removed, of US President William McKinley.

== Notes ==
Political offices
Preceded by Nathan P. Payne	Mayor of Cleveland; 1877–1878	Succeeded by Rensselaer R. Herrick
Preceded by George W. Gardner	Mayor of Cleveland; 1891–1892	Succeeded by Robert Blee
