= Supreme Court of the United States Police Department =

Federal law enforcement agency

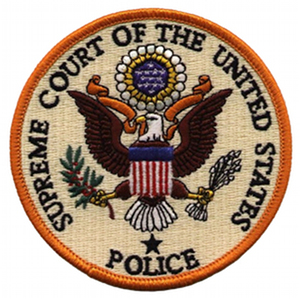
- Patch of the Supreme Court of the United States Police

- Logo of the Supreme Court of the United States

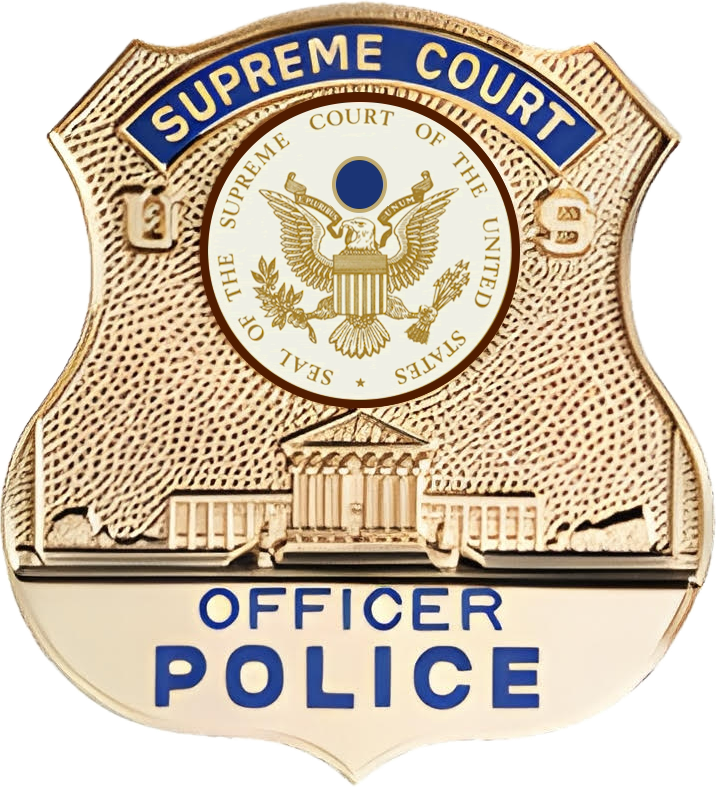
- "Standard" badge of the SCUSPD
- Common name: Supreme Court Police
- Abbreviation: SCUSPD

Agency overview
- Formed: 1935
- Employees: 189

Jurisdictional structure
- Federal agency: U.S.
- Operations jurisdiction: U.S.
- Governing body: Marshal of the United States Supreme Court
- General nature: Federal law enforcement; Civilian police
- Specialist jurisdictions: Buildings and lands occupied or explicitly controlled by the institution and the institution's personnel, and public entering the buildings and precincts of the institution; Protection of international or domestic VIPs, protection of significant state assets

Operational structure
- Headquarters: Supreme Court Building; 1 First Street, NE, Washington, D.C.
- Sworn members: 189

Website
- scuspd.gov

Special Agent Badge Dignitary Protection Unit

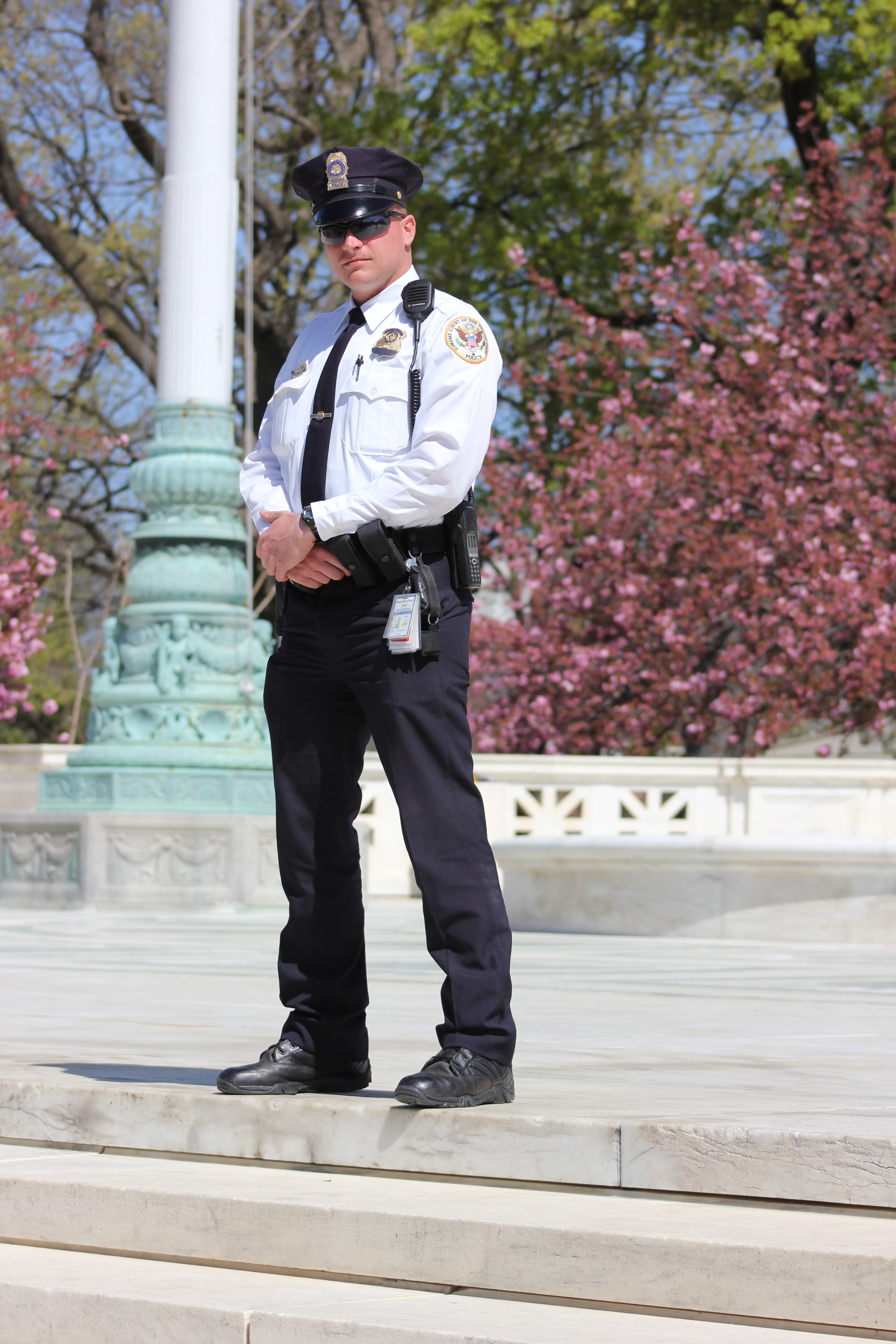
An officer of the Supreme Court Police in March 2012

The Supreme Court of the United States Police Department (SCUSPD), commonly referred to as the Supreme Court Police, is a United States federal security police agency responsible for security and law enforcement services concerning the properties, personnel, and visitors of the Supreme Court of the United States. The department is headed by the marshal of the United States Supreme Court.

The SCUSPD enforces federal and District of Columbia laws and regulations, as well as enforces regulations governing the Supreme Court Building and grounds as prescribed by the head of the SCUSPD (the Marshal of the United States Supreme Court) and as approved by the chief justice of the United States. In addition to more common law enforcement tasks, SCUSPD personnel, in conjunction with United States Marshals Service personnel, are responsible for providing personal protection details to Supreme Court justices (and the chief justice) both domestically and internationally, as well as the justices' homes.

Sworn SCUSPD personnel may exercise law enforcement powers and carry firearms throughout the District of Columbia, and nationally when protecting SCOTUS justices or property; such authority is derived from 40 U.S.C. § 6121.

== History ==
Prior to the completion of its dedicated building, the Supreme Court of the United States operated from within the U.S. Capitol. In 1932, a small contingent of officers from the United States Capitol Police was assigned to protect the construction site of the new Supreme Court Building. Once construction finished, Congress established a dedicated Supreme Court Police Force.

The Supreme Court Police was formally created in 1935 to protect the newly completed building, along with the Justices, Court employees, and visitors. Its initial complement consisted of 33 officers, drawn from the ranks of the Capitol Police and placed under the leadership of Captain Philip H. Crook. To extend their authority beyond the building itself, the officers were commissioned as Special Police Officers by the District of Columbia, which granted them arrest powers. Their annual salary of $1,350 was drawn from the appropriation for the building’s construction.

At inception, personnel were officially designated as “guards.” They were hired by the Marshal of the Supreme Court and required approval from the Chief Justice. The unit adopted the name Supreme Court Police sometime between 1935 and 1941.

On June 6, 1949, Congress passed legislation authorizing the Marshal of the Supreme Court under the direction of the Chief Justice to appoint Court employees as Special Policemen. This measure provided explicit legal authority to enforce laws within the Supreme Court building and on its grounds. The act was modeled after the 1946 legislation that had established the modern United States Capitol Police.

By 1955, the force remained at 33 officers but was undergoing professionalization. Training initiatives were introduced, covering firearms proficiency, first aid, civil defense procedures, and lectures on law enforcement legal issues.

In 1963, the Supreme Court Police hired its first female officer, Lyle T. Evanoff.

In 1982, at the request of Chief Justice Warren E. Burger, Congress enacted legislation that formally recognized Supreme Court Police officers as federal law enforcement officers, clarifying and strengthening their status.

Further enhancements came on December 21, 2000, when legislation extended federal law enforcement retirement benefits to the force.

As of 2024, the Supreme Court Police has an authorized force of 189 officers.

== Duties ==
The Supreme Court Police are responsible for providing a full range of police services, including:

- Protection of the Supreme Court Building and grounds, and persons and property therein
- Dignitary protection for the Supreme Court justices, both domestically and internationally
- Maintain suitable order and decorum within the Supreme Court building and grounds, to include policing demonstrations and large-scale events
- Provide courtroom security
- Prepare numerous reports to include incident, found property, accident, and arrest reports, as well as testify in court

Special Units are available to officers depending on time-in-service, completion of training, and experience.

== Units ==
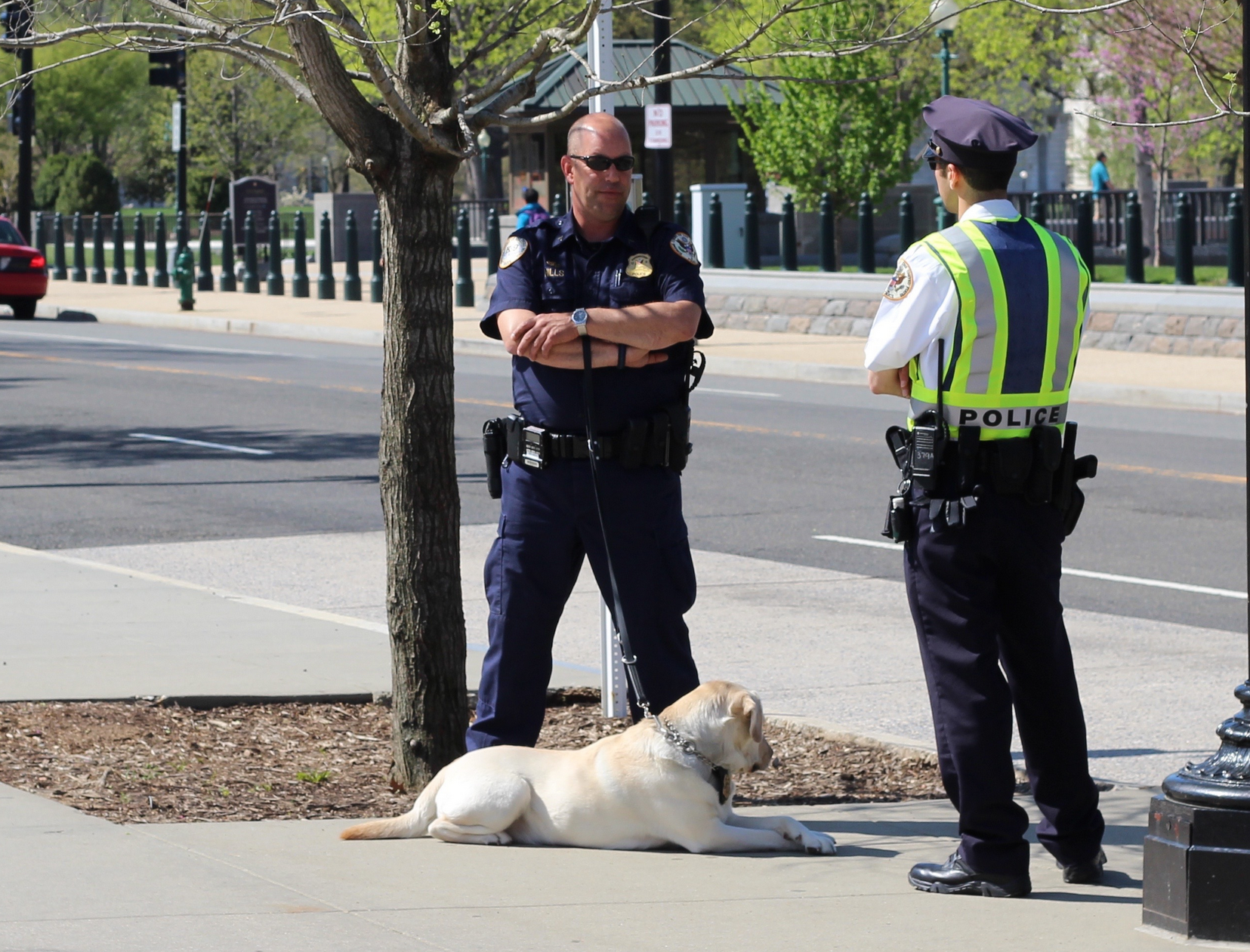
Two officers on duty. One is a K9 officer with a police dog

The Supreme Court Police offers both part-time and full-time specialized units. These units include:

- Dignitary Protection Unit
- Protective Intelligence Unit
- K-9 Unit
- Background Investigations Unit
- Nuclear, Biological, Chemical (NBC) Team
- Recruitment Division
- Police Operations Center - Dispatch
- Physical Security Unit
- Liaison positions with partner agencies (FBI, JTTF, DHS, USCP)
- Training Unit
- Honor Guard
- Various instructor positions, including: Firearms, Driving, Defensive Tactics, CPR/First Aid, Fitness Coordinators

== Training ==
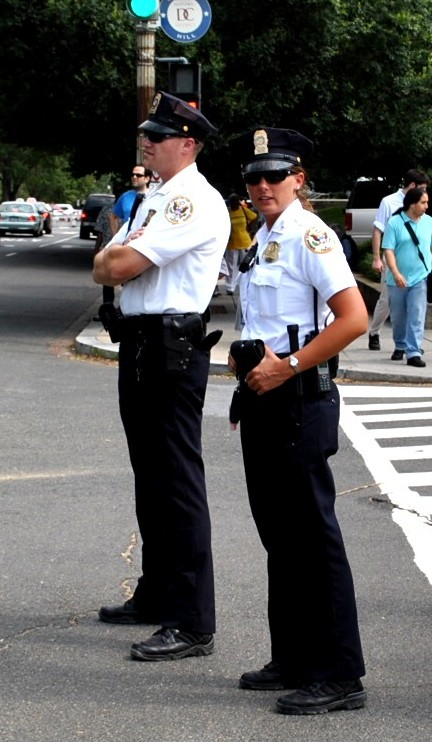
Two Supreme Court Police officers on duty

New Supreme Court Police officers attend the 13-week Uniformed Police Training Program (UPTP) at the Federal Law Enforcement Training Center (FLETC) in Glynco, Georgia. Designated members of specialized units attend the Criminal Investigator Training Program (CITP) at FLETC.

== Salary and compensation ==
In 2024, the starting salary for a newly hired member of the Supreme Court Police was $81,552 a year. The Supreme Court Police also accept lateral hires from local, State and Federal agencies. The starting salary for a lateral hire is $81,552–$139,419.

== See also ==
- List of United States federal law enforcement agencies
