= Stephen Buhrer =

American politician

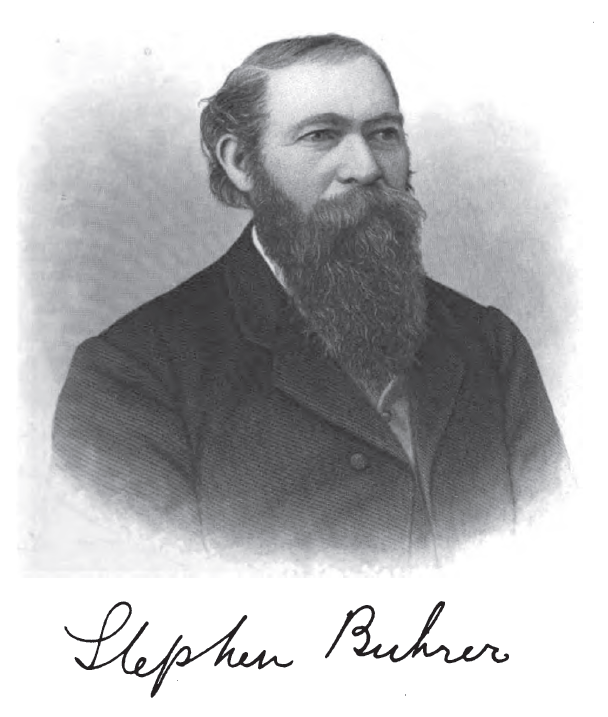

21st Mayor of Cleveland
- In office 1867–1870
- Preceded by: Herman M. Chapin
- Succeeded by: Frederick W. Pelton

Personal details
- Born: December 25, 1825; Zoar, Ohio, U.S.
- Died: December 8, 1907 (aged 81); Cleveland, Ohio, U.S.
- Political party: Democratic
- Spouse: Eva Maria Schneider (m. 1848–1889)
- Children: 3

Stephen Buhrer (December 25, 1825 – December 8, 1907) was an American politician who served as the mayor of Cleveland from 1867 to 1870.

== Early life ==
Buhrer was born near Zoar, Ohio, in Tuscarawas County to Johann Casper and Anna Maria Miller Buhrer. His father died in 1829 and Buhrer was entrusted to the Society of Separatists until he was old enough. Buhrer was educated mainly in Sunday school until he was twelve and he started learning a trade.

== Career ==
Buhrer left the farm and traveled to Cleveland to work as a cooper. Buhrer then became a traveling salesman before returning to Cleveland to open his own coopering shop. He sold his shop and then began distilling alcohol for a living until he eventually became a wholesale distributor of alcoholic beverages. Buhrer was a three-term member of the Cleveland City Council until he was elected as mayor of Cleveland in 1867. The Cleveland House of Correction & Workhouse was built during his tenure as mayor.

== Personal life ==
After serving two terms, he returned to serve another term on the city council before he died in Cleveland in 1907.

In 1848, Buhrer married Eva Maria Schneider and had three children: John, Mary Jane, and Lois Catherine. Eva died in 1889 and after her death, Buhrer married Marguerite Paterson.

Political offices
Preceded by Herman M. Chapin	Mayor of Cleveland; 1867–1870	Succeeded by Frederick W. Pelton
