= Herman M. Chapin =

American politician

20th Mayor of Cleveland
- In office 1865–1866
- Preceded by: George B. Senter
- Succeeded by: Stephen Buhrer

Personal details
- Born: July 23, 1823 Walpole, New Hampshire, U.S.
- Died: May 24, 1879 (aged 55) Cleveland, Ohio, U.S.
- Resting place: Lake View Cemetery
- Party: Independent
- Spouse: Matilda Fenno
- Children: five

Herman M. Chapin (July 29, 1823 – May 24, 1879) was the mayor of Cleveland from 1865–1866.

Chapin was born in Walpole, New Hampshire to Nathaniel and Fanny Bowen Brown Chapin. He was educated locally and eventually moved to Cleveland in 1848 where he became a partner in the grocery business. In 1852, he established his own meat packing company. He initially moved to Chicago but decided to move back to Cleveland after a few years. Chapin raised money for the Union during the Civil War and was elected as mayor in 1865 without having known that he was even nominated. The Metropolitan Police Act, which transferred the police powers of the mayor, police marshal, and city council to a board of police commissioners, was passed during his term. Chapin was also president of the Cleveland Library Association in 1854 and 1858 and helped to establish the First Unitarian Church of Cleveland in 1854. Chapin built the Chapin Block at Public Square in 1854 where Chapin Hall is located. Chapin died in Cleveland and is buried in Lake View Cemetery.

Chapin married Matilda Fenno, from Boston on October 15, 1849 and the two had five children: Erving, Matilda, Fanny, Jeanie, and Agnes.

Political offices
| Preceded by George B. Senter | Mayor of Cleveland; 1864–1865 | Succeeded by Stephen Buhrer |
