= Amos Townsend =

American politician

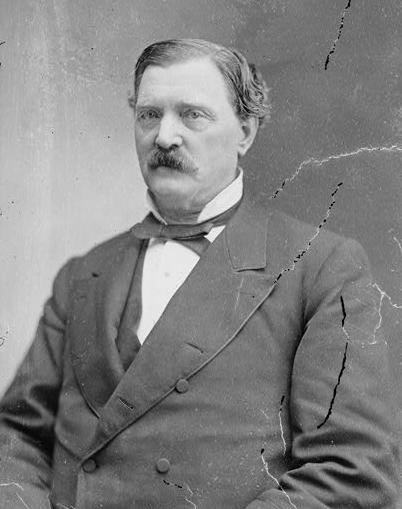

Member of the U.S. House of Representatives from Ohio's 20th district
- In office March 4, 1877 – March 3, 1883
- Preceded by: Henry B. Payne
- Succeeded by: David R. Paige

Personal details
- Born: 1821 Brownsville, Pennsylvania, U.S.
- Died: March 17, 1895 (aged 73–74) St. Augustine, Florida, U.S.
- Resting place: Lake View Cemetery, Cleveland, Ohio, U.S.
- Party: Republican

Amos Townsend (1821 – March 17, 1895) was a 19th–century American businessman and politician who served three terms as a U.S. representative from Ohio from 1877 to 1883.

== Biography ==
Born in Brownsville, Pennsylvania, Townsend attended the common schools of Pittsburgh, Pennsylvania, and clerked in a store in Pittsburgh. He moved to Mansfield, Ohio, in 1839 and engaged in mercantile pursuits. He served as United States marshal during the Kansas troubles.

=== Early political career ===
He moved to Cleveland, Ohio, in 1858 and engaged in the wholesale grocery business. He served as member of the Cleveland City Council from 1866 to 1876, serving as president for seven years. He served as member of the State constitutional convention in 1873.

=== Congress ===
Townsend was elected as a Republican to the Forty-fifth, Forty-sixth, and Forty-seventh Congresses (March 4, 1877 – March 3, 1883). He served as chairman of the Committee on Railways and Canals (Forty-seventh Congress).

He declined renomination. He served as member of a wholesale foodpacking firm.

=== Death and burial ===
He died while on a visit to St. Augustine, Florida, March 17, 1895. He was interred in Lake View Cemetery, Cleveland, Ohio.

== Sources ==
- United States Congress. "Amos Townsend (id: T000328)". Biographical Directory of the United States Congress.

U.S. House of Representatives
Preceded by Henry B. Payne	Member of the U.S. House of Representatives from Ohio's 20th congressional district 1877-1883	Succeeded by David R. Paige
